= National Bolshevik Party =

1993–2007 political party in Russia

National Bolshevik Party Национал-большевистская партия
- Abbreviation: NBP, Nazbols, Limonovites
- Leader: Eduard Limonov
- Founders: Eduard Limonov; Taras Rabko; Aleksandr Dugin; Yegor Letov
- Founded: 1 May 1993; 33 years ago
- Legalised: 16 August 2005; 21 years ago
- Banned: 7 August 2007; 19 years ago
- Succeeded by: The Other Russia; National Bolshevik Front
- Headquarters: NBP Bunker, 17 Maria Ulyanova St., Building 1, Moscow
- Newspaper: Limonka
- Membership: 56,500+ (March 2007 est.)
- Ideology: National Bolshevism; National communism; Left-wing nationalism; Neo-Stalinism; Russian irredentism; Anti-Atlanticism; Anti-Putinism; Anti-Yeltsinism; Anti-Establishment; Political extremism; Civil liberalism; Factions: Neo-Eurasianism; Neo-Fascism; Anarchism
- Political position: Syncretic or far-left
- Coalition: National Salvation Front (1992–1993); Front of the Working People, the Army, and the Youth for the USSR (1997–1999); The Other Russia (2006–2010)
- Colours: Red White Black
- Anthem: "Гимн НБП" (lit. 'Anthem of the NBP') (Note: Created by Dmitri Maximovich Shostakovich)

Party flag
- Other flag

Website
- web.archive.org/web/20070103064031

The National Bolshevik Party (Russian: Национал-большевистская партия, НБП, romanized: Natsional-bolshevistskaya partiya, NBP) was a Russian political party that operated from 1993 until it was banned in 2007. Its members were known as Nazbols (Russian: нацболы).

Founded in 1993 by writer Eduard Limonov, law student Taras Rabko, political philosopher Aleksandr Dugin, and punk musician Yegor Letov, the NBP was seen as an attempt to unite left-wing and right-wing extremists on the same platform, with Ilya Ponomarev characterising the party as having "used a bizarre mixture of totalitarian and fascist symbols, geopolitical dogma, leftist ideas, and national-patriotic demagoguery." Dugin left the party in 1998, and from the early 2000s the NBP focused on human rights activism as part of the anti-Putin movement in Russia, becoming known for its direct action tactics. In 2006, the NBP, alongside Garry Kasparov's United Civil Front and the Vanguard of Red Youth, formed The Other Russia coalition.

In 2007, the NBP was declared an extremist organization by the Supreme Court of Russia and was banned. The NBP was, at the time, the only large-scale nationwide organization officially recognized by a court as extremist under the Law on Combating Extremist Activity.

There have been smaller NBP groups in other post-Soviet countries, as well as in the United States and Israel. The party's official publication, the newspaper Limonka, derived its name from Limonov's surname and from the idiomatic Russian word for a grenade. The main editor of Limonka was, for many years, Aleksey Volynets. In 2010, Limonov and other former members founded a new party, The Other Russia of E. V. Limonov.

== Ideology ==
=== Party platform ===
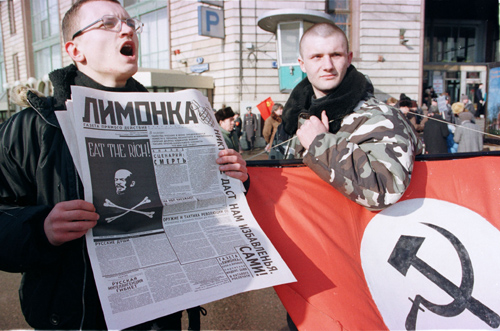
Members of the National Bolshevik Party at a protest rally in Moscow with a copy of the Limonka newspaper (photo by Mikhail Evstafiev)

The NBP claimed inspiration from the National Bolshevik ideas that arose during the Russian Civil War, such as those of Nikolai Ustryalov, who came to believe that Bolshevism could be modified to serve nationalistic purposes. His followers, the Smenovekhovtsy, who then came to regard themselves as National Bolsheviks, borrowed the term from German politician Ernst Niekisch, who was initially associated with left-wing politics and later National Bolshevism. However, the NBP differed from their cited historical inspirations; while Ustryalov advocated for capitalism, the NBP instead agitated for nationalisation and a welfare state. According to scholar Marta Żakowska, the party's ideology "aligns more closely with recent leftist philosophical thought than with the historical projects it alludes to in its name". Limonov also distanced himself from the historical National Bolshevism and saw National Bolshevism and the NBP as two different things, describing the party's version of the ideology as "the fusion of the most radical forms of social resistance with the most radical forms of national resistance".

The NBP's ideology and style were initially modeled after Italian fascism while the party simultaneously defended the Soviet Union's domestic policies, specifically those implemented under Stalinism, asserting that they were a means of preserving the country's "national and social justice." The party was described by observers as a mixture of far-left and far-right ideology. Limonov and the party romanticized revolutionaries, political radicalism and its aesthetics across the entire political spectrum, ranging from the Italian Blackshirts to figures like Yukio Mishima, Andreas Baader, Felix Dzerzhinsky, Mikhail Bakunin and Ayatollah Khomeini. Some analysts have interpreted the totalitarian aesthetics, uniformity, and ideology of the NBP as a form of postmodern stiob, satire, contrarianism and post-irony.

Alexander Dugin, the party's chief ideologist and follower of the conservative revolution, defined politics in a metapolitical sense as a fight between "the old", who wanted to maintain the status quo, and "the new", who wanted to destroy it, regardless of specific political affiliations. The party's clientel would therefore be located on the anti-establishment "new" side of politics and consisted of "the most dangerous elements of society". Dugin's ideology was a combination of historical National Bolshevism and Marxism–Leninism, Russian irredentism, Orthodox Traditionalism, esoteric neo-Nazism and Occultism, anti- and postmodernism and opposition to "Western" values – an ideological system he later propagated as neo-Eurasianism.

The party's base was, especially in its early days, very heterodox and considered a big tent of marginal and radicalized political groups and subcultures, which made the establishment of a unified party line that went beyond anti-establishment, as tried by Dugin, difficult. Sociologist Alexander Tarasov described the party as a "lifestyle party" in which everyone "projected their own political beliefs onto Limonov" and the party served as a "psychological outlet" for young people who were dissatisfied with Yeltsin's Russia. This allowed Limonov to pivot dynamically. He described the party base as a bizarre mix of "retired Stalinists, former Trotskyists, postmodernist gays, Nazi skinheads, former anarchists, punks, bohemians, Orthodox traditionalists, Buddhist neophytes, and so on." According to Tarasov, the party had problems arranging seating plans as to avoid scuffles between the different groups. Limonov, with his hypermasculine, scandal-ridden and rebellious image and fashion style (black combat boots, leather jacket, tinted glasses), established a cult following among some young, disenfranchised men who flocked to the party. Limonov saw himself as an Ayatollah-esque figure and aspired to be the "spiritual leader" of Russia rather than its president.Alexei Tsvetkov, an anarchist and key member of the NBP in the 1990s, described the party base as "hooligans who wanted to be poets and poets who wanted to be hooligans".

The party was shunned by some right-wing movements like Russian National Unity for being associated with ethnic and societal minorities. Limonov and Dugin openly allied and collaborated with queer activists like Slava Mogutin and members with Jewish origin like Vladimir Linderman rose up to leadership positions. Another point of friction with many right-wing nationalists was that the party espoused a form of supra-ethnic irredentist nationalism (rossiyskiy) rather than Russian ethnonationalism (russkiy), which would mean the presence of many non-Russian and non-Slavic ethnicities in the NBP's "new Russian state". In their 1994 program, the NBP defined russianness not by ethnicity, but by belonging, or feeling like belonging, to the imperial Russian or Eurasianist geography, culture, language or identity. Co-founder Yegor Letov described it as "nationalism by territory", while unfavorably comparing "nationalism by blood" with Nazism. Despite that, the party supported the Russian ethnic minorities in the near abroad.

According to the 1994 program, the global goal of National Bolshevism is the creation of an "Empire from Vladivostok to Gibraltar based on the Russian civilization," and the essence of National Bolshevism lies in "a withering hatred for the anti-human system of the trinity: liberalism/democracy/capitalism. A man of rebellion, a National Bolshevik sees his mission in destroying the system to its foundations. A traditionalist, hierarchical society will be built on the ideals of spiritual masculinity and social and national justice." National Bolshevism's external enemy was identified as "the Great Satan – the USA and the European mondialists". The party's aim after achieving power was to build "a total state, where human rights will give way to the rights of the nation" and "any separatist aspirations of national minorities will be ruthlessly suppressed". The party's economic program was to "terminate all agreements with the West" and build an autarkic socialist "economic dictatorship" with progressive nationalization. Other party positions included "the establishment of Russian sheriffs, empowered to deliver the culprit dead or alive; the live broadcasting of executions on television; a ban on abortions; and a legal obligation for all women between 25 and 35 years of age to give birth to at least four children".

The party supported Yeltsin's invasion of Chechnya starting the First Chechen War. In 1996, Limonov was investigated for “inciting racial hatred“ and „glorifying war“ after publishing two articles in Limonka the year prior titled “Hand grenades at Croats“ and „Black list of peoples“. In them, Limonov argued that certain nations and peoples have a collective guilt before Russia due to their history, like collaboration with the Axis powers (Croatia, Slovakia, Latvia) or the Whites (Czechia) during the civil war. He also pitied that Stalin did not "go till the end" in deporting the Caucasian peoples like the Chechens, Ingush and Crimean Tatars.

After Dugin's departure from the party in 1998 and during Limonov's prison sentence in 2001–2003, the NBP experienced an ideological shift under the guidance of Vladimir Linderman, Limonov's second-in-command. Moving away from its previous totalitarian positions, the party's main focus became human rights and pro-democratic activism, while retaining its Russian nationalism, anti-NATO sentiment, and left-wing economic positions. In its later years, the party publicly denounced fascism and rejected "any form of xenophobia, antisemitism, or racial intolerance" and reaffirmed their support of Great Russian civic nationalism.

Limonov explained this ideological shift, stating:

Why would we bother playing with fascism anymore when the Kremlin is already fascist? […] We are an opposition party. And today the most radical position of all is to fight for democracy and elections — against Putin’s fascism.

On 29 November 2004, at the party's fifth congress, a new program was adopted. According to the new program, "the main goal of the National Bolshevik Party is to transform Russia into a modern, powerful state, respected by other countries and peoples and beloved by its own citizens". The program demanded the free development of civil society, freedom of independent media, public oversight of law enforcement, an end to the Second Chechen War via negotiation, and the protection of the rights of Russian-speaking people outside of Russia. The program was highly critical of Vladimir Putin's government and state institutions, stating that "the activities of the FSB and the Ministry of Internal Affairs today pose no less of a threat to the security of Russian citizens than Chechen terrorists".

On the difference between the 1994 and 2004 programs, the party stated:

The NBP doesn't change its ideology, but our ideology evolves and develops based on the current reality. In the mid-1990s, when the NBP began its existence, the party's main slogans were national and social justice. The ideal state structure was a total state based on strict discipline. It envisioned harsh punishment for those directly responsible for the collapse of the country, "privatization," and "shock therapy." This was a response to the rampant "democratic" permissiveness.

However, after Putin came to power, a "tightening of the screws" and political repression of dissent (primarily the NBP) began. Under these conditions, advocating for totalitarian slogans became simply stupid and politically illiterate. Therefore, to the demands for national and social justice, the National Bolsheviks added a third component: the demand for civil and political liberties.

Tarasov explained Limonov's ideological shift through the works he wrote in prison, especially his book "The Other Russia". In it, Limonov advocated for the abolishment of the Russian nation, the church, the family unit and everything that limits the individual, in order to overcome what he called the "Russian adat". To Limonov the "Russian adat" was the summary of the customs, traditions, psychology and culture of the Russian people. Limonow also praised Bakunin, taking more classically anarchist positions. After the abolishment of the Russian state and adat, according to Limonov, a new nation would arise, uniting all the peoples from the former Soviet Union. Tarasov jokingly titled this "Anarcho-Imperialism".

According to an FAQ document published by the party in 2005, the NBP "advocates social justice in the economy, imperial dominance in foreign policy, and civil and political freedoms in domestic politics" and that "a National Bolshevik state is harsh on the outside, against external enemies, and soft on the inside, for its own citizens (unlike today's Russia, whose government constantly compromises national interests on the global stage while oppressing its own people)." In economic policy, the document called for nationalisation of oligarch property and for state funds to be redistributed as reparations for privatisation; in foreign policy, it claimed as the party's goal the restoration of the USSR "as a counterweight to the growing appetites of the United States" but also to "fight against creeping Chinese expansion"; in domestic policy, it condemned Vladimir Putin's administration as "oligarchic, despotic, and anti-national" and the Kadyrov family as a "criminal clan".

Speaking on the colour revolutions, the document voiced ambivalent support:

The National Bolsheviks are studying the practice of velvet revolutions. We admire the people taking to the streets and squares of Kiev chanting, "We are not cattle! We are not goats!" A bloodless, non-violent revolution is one of the models of action that can lead the opposition to victory. From this perspective, we support the Maidan. On the other hand, it is clear to us that Yushchenko and Saakashvili, who came to power through a velvet coup, are politicians hostile to Russia and puppets of the West. In this sense, the National Bolshevik Party is a staunch opponent of such "orange" forces.

=== Counterculture and art ===
Since its formation, the National Bolshevik Party has had relationships with the Russian counterculture in Russia, the post-Soviet countries, and Israel. National Bolsheviks often used shock aesthetics from the punk subculture in their propaganda and was, in its early years, structured more like an avant-garde art project and hangout than a political party. The NBP attracted a significant number of artists, punk musicians, and rock bands. Bands involved in the party included NBP co-founder Yegor Letov's Grazhdanskaya Oborona, Kalinov Most, Leningrad, Volshebnaya Gora, Korrozia Metalla, Zapreshchennye barabanshchiki, Krasnye Zvezdy, Pop-Mechanics, Nozh dlya frau Myuller, Banda chetyryokh, Manager & Rodina and Instruktsiya po Vyzhivaniyu. Punk music was considered one of the main modes of expression of the NBP, while many visual artists designed various forms of avant-garde agitprop for the party and Limonka, using the NBP as a platform for their artistic expression. Some of these bands performed as part of the NBP-affiliated rock project Russkiy proryv ("Russian Breakthrough"). Gonzo tabloid The eXile also featured NBP material, including a column by Limonov. Limonov, who was involved in punk circles during his exile in New York City and called himself the "Johnny Rotten of literature", aimed at cultivating a following of punks, bohemians, artists, and misfits, and wanted the NBP to become the leading organization of the Russian counterculture and avant-garde. In the manifesto of The Other Russia, NBP's unofficial successor party, Limonov wrote that the October Revolution was not initially organized by the "sailors, peasants and [...] workers", but by "misfits, hysterics, tramps, demagogues, orators, half-educated people, bums, and all kinds of rolling stones."

Many of the artists and intellectuals like Dugin, Letov or Sergey Kuryokhin saw the merging of art and radical politics, including fascism, as a tool for transforming oppressive reality in the spirit of situationism and May 68, as well as an absolute and authentic commitment to an art project.

== Party symbolism ==
The symbols of the National Bolshevik Party are a combination of communist, national socialist, and Imperial Russian symbols; the party nonetheless denied any link to fascism and national socialism. The symbol was designed by graphic designer Konstantin Chuvachev and inspired from the shirt worn by Sid Vicious, portrayed by Gary Oldman, in the 1986 film Sid and Nancy. Sid Vicious, like many punks at the time, wore a swastika for shock value, which was changed for the film to a hammer and sickle to avoid censorship. The party's flag was first unveiled at a Yegor Letov concert in Moscow in 1993.

The NBP's flag (center) is similar to the flag of Nazi Germany (left), with a white circle on a red field, yet with the hammer and sickle symbol of the flag of the Soviet Union (right) instead of the swastika.
The Romanov flag (left) and black NBP flag (center) were additionally used by the NBP. The black version became the primary flag after the ban, to evade censorship but show continued opposition. Variations of the flag like with the Limonka Grenade (right) were used after the ban and by The Other Russia, other versions included the Black Sun or ЦЕНЗУРА (CENSORSHIP).

The party's motto was "Russia is everything, the rest is nothing!" (Russian: "Россия — всё, остальное — ничто!"), and it adopted the greeting "Yes, death!" (Russian: "Да, смерть!"). The party's members also combined the roman salute with the raised fist.

Artist Aleksandr Lebedev-Frontov, who was the visual editor for Limonka, was responsible for a lot of the famous imagery and aesthetics used by the party, one of the most well known icons being a picture of French fictional villain Fantômas pointing a gun.

== History ==
=== 1992–2000: origins and early years ===
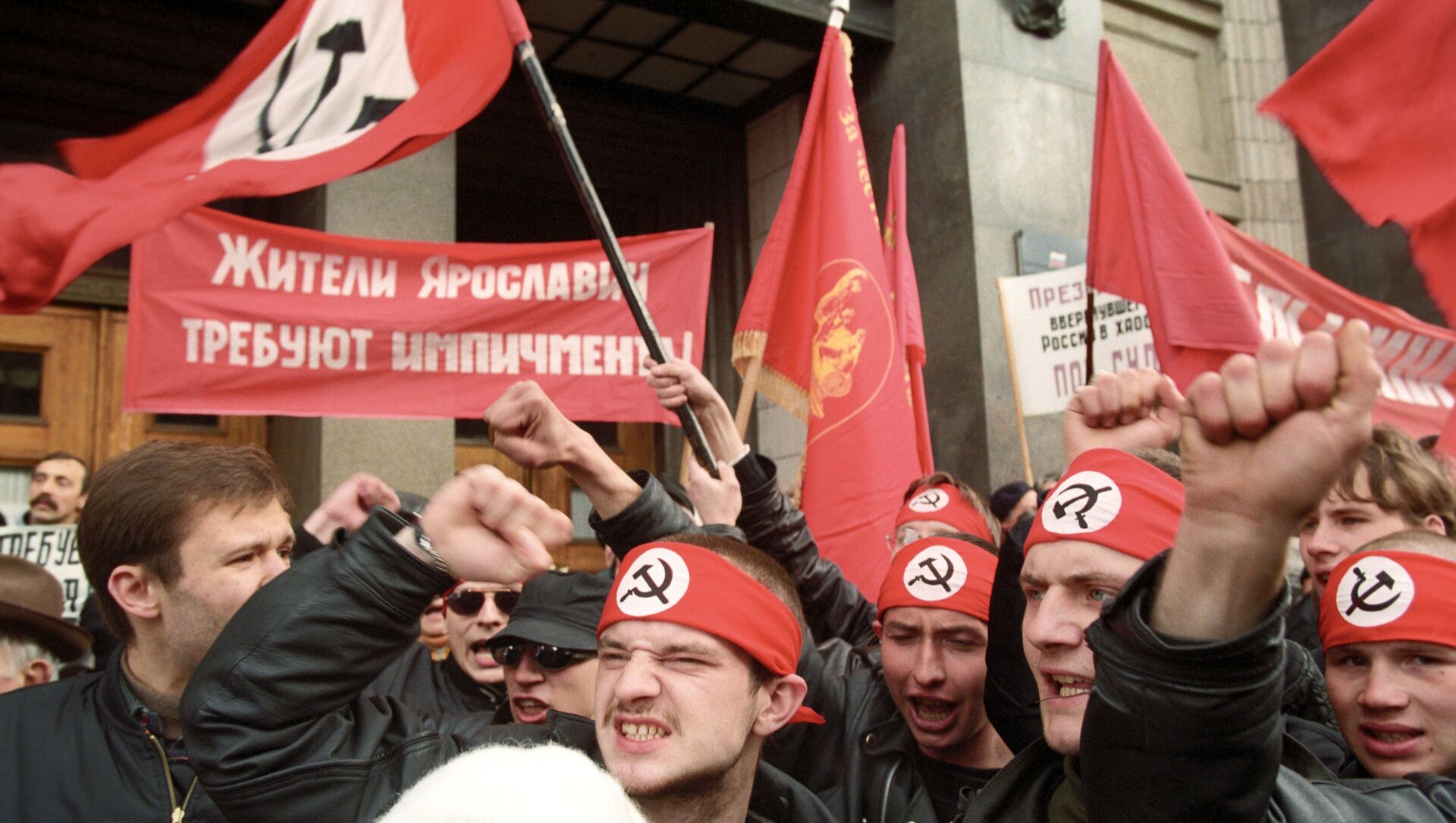
National Bolshevik Party activists at a rally in support of Boris Yeltsin's impeachment, 15 May 1999

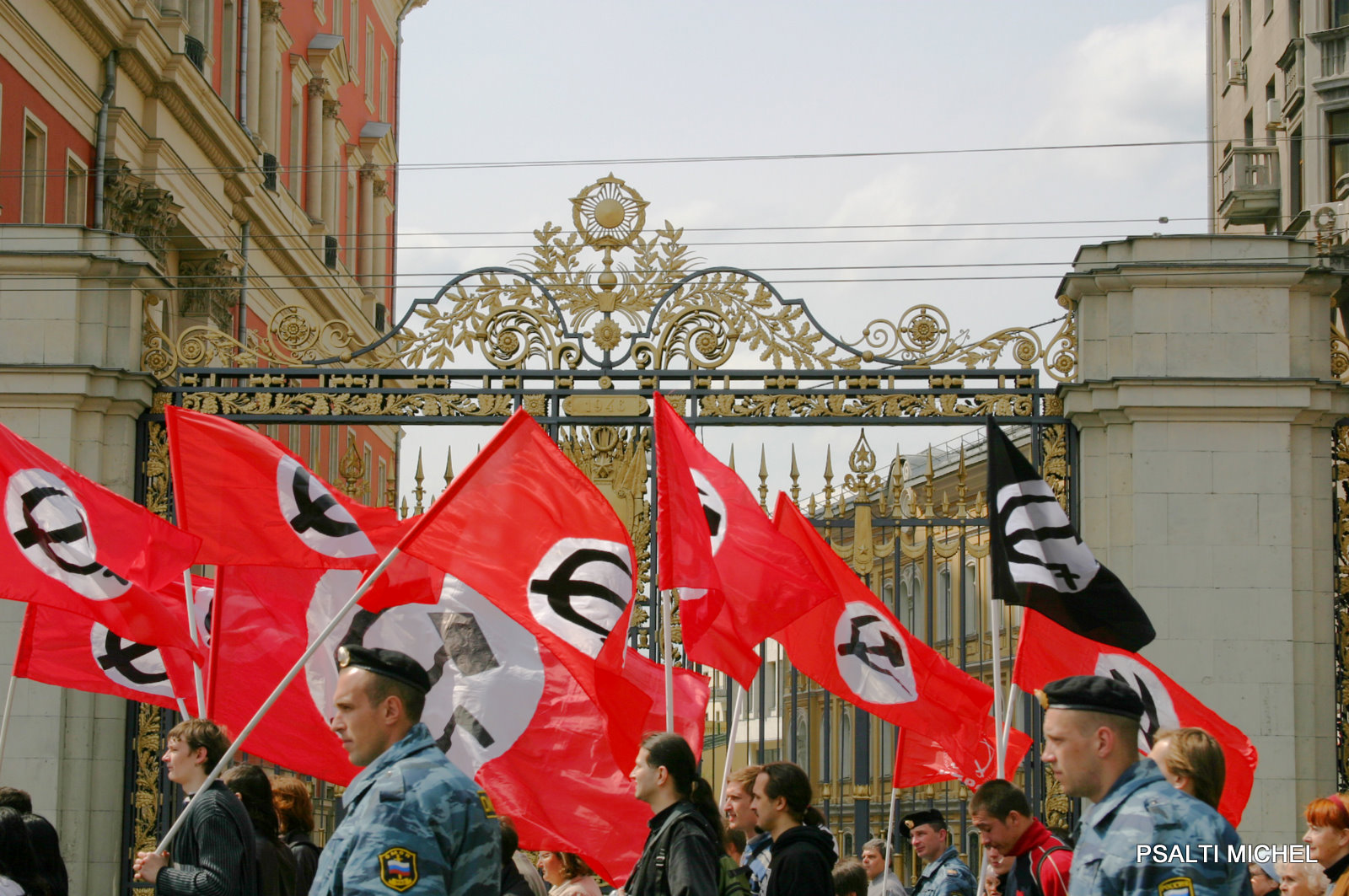
National Bolsheviks during a demonstration in 2006

In 1992, Eduard Limonov founded the National Bolshevik Front (NBF) as an amalgamation of six minor groups. Aleksandr Dugin was among the earliest members and was instrumental in convincing Limonov to enter politics. The front first attracted attention in the same year when two members were arrested for possessing grenades. The incident gave the NBF publicity for a boycott campaign they were organizing against Western goods. The NBF joined forces with the National Salvation Front (NSF), which was a broad coalition of Russian communists and nationalists.

On 1 May 1993, Limonov and Dugin signed the declaration of the founding of the NBP:

The political struggle in Russia has reached a critical point. The resistance phase has exhausted itself, and therefore the traditional opposition (merely emotional, purely protest-based) has exhausted itself. The period of resistance is over, and a period of national uprising is beginning.

This new stage requires new methods, new forms, and new instruments of political struggle. Therefore, we deem it necessary to create a radical political and ideological structure of a new, unprecedented type, designed to adequately respond to the challenge of History. Let there be National Bolshevism!

What is National Bolshevism? The fusion of the most radical forms of social resistance with the most radical forms of national resistance is National Bolshevism.

Along with Dugin and Limonov, a co-founding member of the party was Siberian punk musician Yegor Letov, who was invited by Limonov. According to Limonov, Letov's membership in the party drew "thousands of recruits over the years", but he "proved to be inconsistent, capricious, and unpredictable". Other prominent musicians who were members of the NBP included Konstantin Ryabinov of Grazhdanskaya Oborona, Sergey Kuryokhin of Pop-Mechanics and Aquarium, Sergey "Shnur" Shnurov of Leningrad, Sergei "Pauk" Troitsky of Korrozia Metalla, Dmitry Revyakin of Kalinov Most, Oleg Sudakov of Manager & Rodina, Limonov's then-wife Nataliya Medvedeva, Aleksandr Nepomnyashchiy and Roman Konoplev. Artists who collaborated with the party included writers Alexei Tsvetkov, Zakhar Prilepin and Oleg Kashin, filmmakers and visual artists Oleg Mavromati (who made the propaganda film "NBP Dedicated"), Aleksandr Lebedev-Frontov and Slava Mogutin, journalists Mark Ames and Matt Taibbi of The eXile, and mathematician Misha Verbitsky.

The NBF was one of the leading groups involved in the 1993 Russian constitutional crisis, and Limonov and Letov participated in the clashes near the White House in Moscow on the side of the anti-Yeltsin opposition and Rutskoy supporters. Limonov gave an interview on 3 October during the storming of the Comecon building and was present at the assault on the Ostankino. Earlier that year they also organized protests and concerts of Russkiy proryv during 1 May. When others within the coalition began to speak out against the NBF, it withdrew from the New Salvation Front.

On 28 November 1994, Limonov founded the Limonka, the official newspaper of the NBP. Many underground and countercultural figures published in it.

Letov and Limonov fell out in 1996, as Letov publicly supported CPRF candidate Gennady Zyuganov for the presidential election of that year. Limonov on the other hand counterintuitively supported Yeltsin, as he despised Zyuganov for not being a "true communist" and wanted to accelerate the collapse of the political system under Yeltsin. Letov ceased all contact with the NBP by 1999, distancing himself from nationalism, totalitarianism and politics itself and reaffirming his support for anarchism.

In 1997, the NBP joined forces with Stalinist trade unionist Viktor Anpilov and his party Labour Russia, Stanislav Terekhov's Union of Officers and Soyuz to form the Front of the Working People, Army, and Youth for the USSR and supported the 1998 Russian miners' strike. The NBP left the coalition in 1999.

In the same year, Dugin published the foundational work of his neo-Eurasianism "Foundations of Geopolitics", which describes an Schmittian geopolitcal struggle between the thalassocratic Atlanticist empire of the United States and the tellurocratic Eurasian empire of Russia. In 1998, Dugin left the NBP after a conflict with Limonov. Dugin wanted to transform the party into a coherent political force, that would seek to integrate into state structures and exert real political influence on Russian and Kremlin elites, while Limonov wanted to ramp up the direct action dissidence. The departure of Dugin and his followers led to the party moving further left in Russia's political spectrum, and led to the party denouncing Dugin and his group as fascists. Dugin later established the Eurasia Party, which endorses a significantly more radical nationalist and socially conservative view of National Bolshevism. Dugin started offering his services to the Russian elite and his ideology is considered somewhat influential on the government of Putin and especially his geopolitical advisor Sergey Karaganov, with some comparing Dugin to Grigori Rasputin.

In late 1999, the only remaining co-founder Taras Rabko left the party after being offered a research job at the St. Petersburg State University Faculty of Law. Rabko also resigned from Limonka and asked for any mention of him as founder of Limonka to be removed from the newspaper. He was succeeded as Editor by Sergei Aksenov. Limonov was now the only founding member remaining.

The party gained nationwide notoriety when members heckled a speech by Yegor Gaidar yelling the NBP slogan “This is how we will implement our reforms: Stalin! Beria! Gulag!” (Завершим реформы так: Сталин! Берия! ГУЛАГ!).

=== 2000–2003: arrest of Eduard Limonov ===
After Yeltsin stepped down and Vladimir Putin took over in 2000, Limonov tried to escape the increasing repression by the state and unlikeliness of a revolution by offering his and the party's services to the new authorities. In a meeting with Moscow police chief Vladimir Pronin, Limonov offered to act as plausibly deniable provocateurs and protectors of Russian interests abroad, like in the CIS, Ukraine or Latvia, as to create leeway for himself and the NBP against mounting state surveillance and harassment. Limonov labeled this change of tactics the "Fyodorov program", which was adopted at the third party congress in February 2000.

Limonov, Aksenov and a number of supporters were arrested in April 2001 at a village in Altai close to the Kazakhi border by the FSB after illegally acquiring weapons and munition. Five members including Limonov and Aksenov, were jailed on charges of terrorism, the forced overthrow of the constitutional order, and the illegal purchase of weapons. The Russian government accused the group of trying to raise a milita to invade Kazakhstan and incite a popular uprising of the Russian diaspora (termed "Sudeten Russians") in the East Kazakhstan Region, which was called the Pugachev plot.

After Limonov's arrest, party members started activities (including direct action stunts) against Putin's government. In 2002, NBP members participated in Anticapitalism 2002, a demonstration of far-left forces in Moscow. National Bolsheviks clashed with OMON. In 2003, Limonov was released from Lefortovo Prison.

=== 2004–2007: in opposition to the government ===
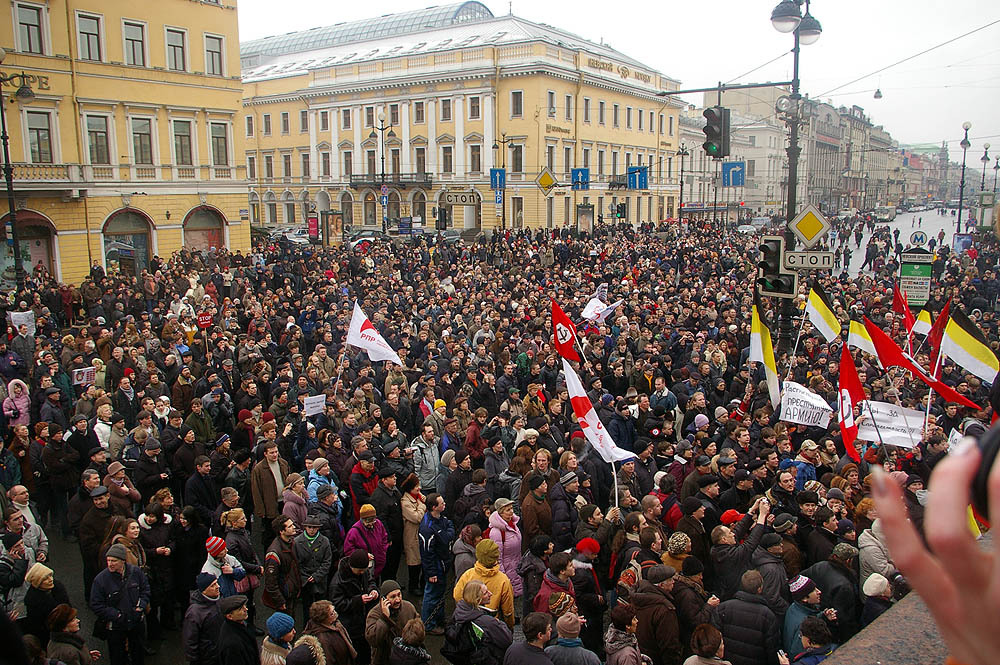
National Bolshevik Party flags during a Dissenters' March rally in Saint Petersburg, Russia, on 3 March 2007

Since 2004, the NBP has formed alliances with other opposition forces, both far-left and right-wing. In 2004, Limonov signed the declaration titled "Russia without Putin." In August 2006, a right-wing anti-Limonov faction of the NBP formed the National Bolshevik Front, which became officially affiliated with Dugin's Eurasian Youth Union. In February 2004, the left-wing nationalist party Rodina was formed, and has been accused of being a government sponsored spoiler to push moderate nationalists away from the NBP.

Limonov and the NBP were targets of harassment by pro-Kremlin groups like Nashi or the Moscow Bureau for Human Rights, who accused Limonov and the NBP of fascism and racial hatred. On 29 August 2005, members of the NBP, Rodina, and other leftist groups were attacked by a group of masked men with baseball bats after a meeting. According to multiple sources and Limonov, the men wore Nashi insignia. Nashi denied any involvement.

On 2 August 2006, Limonov filed a complaint with the European Court of Human Rights regarding Rosreestr's refusal to officially register the NBP as a political party, claiming that this refusal is "an act of state suppression of the political opposition in the Russian Federation." In its refusal, dated January 2006, Rosreestr determined that the NBP's founding congress lacked a quorum and that its program "contains elements of nationalist agendas expressed in the stated goal of protecting the rights of Russian and Russian-speaking people," which violates Article 9 of the Law "On Political Parties."

The NBP became a prominent member of The Other Russia coalition of opposition parties. In 2007, the NBP members took part in a Dissenters' March and other subsequent demonstrations against the government.

=== 2007–2010: outlawed and aftermath ===
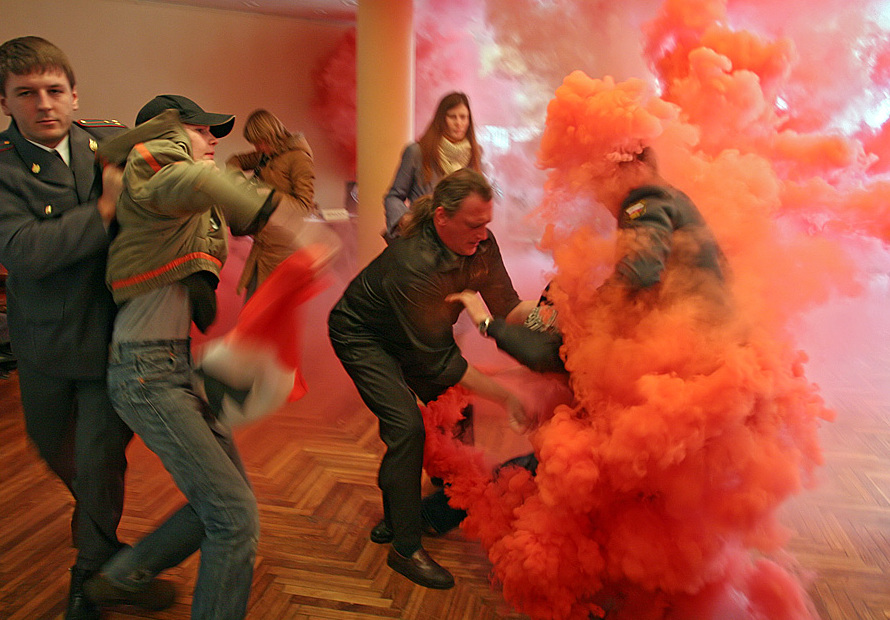
National Bolsheviks attack a polling station in Odintsovo, Moscow Oblast, during the 2007 Russian legislative election to protest the ban of the party

The NBP was banned by a Russian lower court in June 2005; the Supreme Court of Russia overturned that ban on 16 August 2005. In November 2005, the Supreme Court upheld a ban on the party on the grounds that the NBP called itself a political party without being registered as such.

On 19 April 2007, the Moscow City Court, pursuant to Articles 7 and 9 of the Federal Law "On Combating Extremist Activity", declared the NBP to be extremist and banned its activities in Russia; on 7 August, the Supreme Court of Russia upheld this decision, recognizing the NBP as an extremist organization and confirming the ban. The decision was based on three incidents:

- A warning issued to the Chelyabinsk branch of the NBP for several publications in its newspaper, PARA BELLUM, in 2005–2006, for which three of its authors were convicted on charges of inciting ethnic hatred, calling for extremist activity, and attempting to organize mass riots. However, this group of Chelyabinsk National Bolsheviks led an intra-party split composed of a consistently nationalist-oriented section of the NBP activists dissatisfied with the leadership's new political course. As a result, a large group of NBP members, including those responsible for these publications, were expelled from the NBP by a decision of the NBP Political Council on 11 March 2006. This was followed by a public disassociation from the "Chelyabinsk splitters" on the NBP website, which, among other things, stated that one of them had been expelled for an article that later figured in his case;
- A direct action at a session of the Legislative Assembly of St. Petersburg on 22 November 2006 by three National Bolsheviks who distributed leaflets and allegedly used violence against police officers;
- A direct action at a polling station in Odintsovo, Moscow Oblast, on 11 March 2007, during the elections to the Moscow Oblast Duma, by three National Bolsheviks, who lit smoke flares, attempted to distribute leaflets, and overturned a ballot box, and also injured the hand of the chairperson of the election commission who tried to stop them.

By 2008, the St. Petersburg court dropped the criminal prosecutions of the activists who participated in the action at the Legislative Assembly. On this basis, Limonov insisted that this annulled one of the counts for which the party was recognised as extremist and appealed for the Supreme Court to review the case in light of this. However, this appeal was denied on 1 April 2008.

Regarding the ban, Moscow Helsinki Group activist Lyudmila Alexeyeva stated:

The NBP has evolved from a shocking hooligan party to a normal party with democratic ideals. And now it's being accused of extremism. If they had previously declared the Movement Against Illegal Immigration, the Union of Orthodox Banner-Bearers, and other such people, and the NBP along with them, extremists, and then said they didn't look into it, took it as a whole, didn't notice the evolution... But no, they did notice — that's precisely why they declared it. If Limonov hadn't joined The Other Russia, I assure you, it would have existed peacefully.

Human rights activist Lev Ponomaryov stated:

The National Bolsheviks were a fairly extremist organization ten years ago, but they're being tried for what they represent now, and now they stand for civil rights and freedoms.

On 10 November 2007, 22-year-old NBP activist Yuriy Chervochkin died after being beaten with a baseball bat. Although no perpetrator was officially convicted, members of the opposition believe that he was murdered by the police. Limonov and Kasparov attended his funeral and a memorial march for him was held by NBP members and other opposition groups on 17 January 2008 in Moscow. On 14 January 2009, another NBP activist, the 20-year-old Anton Stradymov, was brutally beaten to death at Vykhino metro station in Moscow.

In July 2009, the party was again severely weakened after the Moscow branch collectively resigned from the party to protest the purge of its leader, Roman Popkov, from the party on the behest of Limonov. Popkov had been accused of factionalism and collaboration with the FSB prior to his expulsion after he had criticized Limonow's unilateral plans to run for the presidency in 2012.

In 2009, former NBP members took part in Strategy-31, a series of civic protests in support of the right to peaceful assembly. In July 2010, the National Bolsheviks founded a new political party, The Other Russia of E. V. Limonov.

In 2010, NBP member Andrei Sukhorada became nationally famous and popular as part of the guerilla group Primorsky Partisans. Years prior, Sukhorada helped occupy the United Russia headquarters during a direct action by the NBP in 2004. Sukhorada died during a shootout with police in June 2010.

In 2013, former NBP member and opposition activist Aleksandr Dolmatov killed himself in a deportation center in Rotterdam, after his application for political asylum was denied. His death led to an investigation and a huge public outcry in the Netherlands.

In September 2021, the European Court of Human Rights found that there was a violation of Article 11 of the European Convention on Human Rights on account of the dissolution of the NBP association in 2004 and on account of the refusal to register the NBP as a political party, and awarded €10,000 jointly to Limonov's two teenage children and four party members, including Aleksandr Averin and Andrei Dmitriev.

== Tactics ==
The party's main mode of operation changed from the provocation of scandals and outrage through art and media in its early years to non-violent direct action stunts, mostly involving throwing food at prominent government officials and occupation of government buildings. The party cited the Greenpeace movement as an inspiration in its tactics, also envoking heroism and martyrdom. Drawing on Western protest culture, the party was one of the first groups in Russia to adopt direct action and flash mob tactics and inspired others in the opposition movement to do so; those influenced by the NBP's tactics include the organisations Vanguard of Red Youth, Oborona,Youth Yabloko, activist Petr Pavlensky, and Pussy Riot.

Justifying its use of direct action tactics over traditional party campaigning, the NBP stated: "The government cuts off all forces it deems undesirable from the electoral process. [...] In response to being squeezed out of mainstream politics, the National Bolsheviks began organizing direct actions to make their position known. Traditional rallies and marches have long been ineffective, as they are usually ignored by those in power."

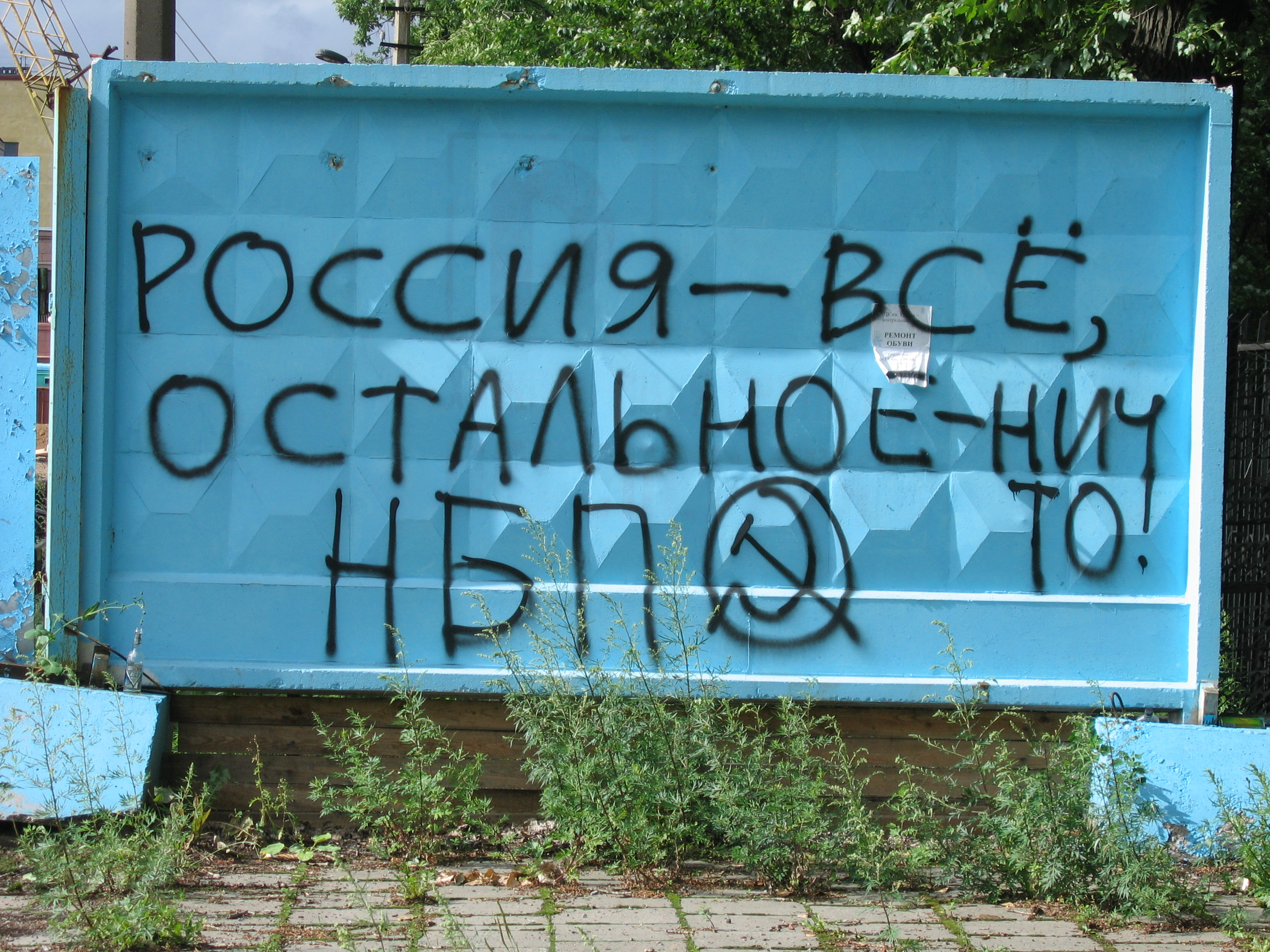
Graffiti: "Russia is everything, the rest is nothing! NBP"

Due to these actions, which the NBP called "velvet terror", over 100 of its members have been jailed over the years.

=== Notable direct actions and stunts ===
In 1995, Sergey Kuryokhin and Dugin appeared on the political talk show "Babylon" hosted by Dmitry Zapolsky, wearing the heads of the Egyptian gods Anubis and Thoth, parodying and criticizing Yeltsin's moralist form of political discourse and polarization. They advertised the NBP and Dugin's election campaign for the legislative elections of the same year. The last concert of Kuryokhin's Pop-Mechanics in September 1995 was also held to support Dugin and dedicated to Aleister Crowley under the title "What is concealed will be revealed". Prior to his engagement with the NBP, Kuryokhin was already known as a provocateur, as he was responsible for the infamous Soviet media hoax "Lenin is a mushroom" in 1991.

In January 1999, a group of NBP activists interrupted a speech of Yegor Gaidar, known as the architect of shock therapy, at the congress of his party Democratic Choice of Russia in January 1999. As Gaidar mentioned the threat of a red-brown alliance in Russia, the members of the NBP stood up and repeatedly yelled ”Stalin! Beria! Gulag!” with their raised fist. Security intervened and a scuffle ensued. Russian news media took the incident as proof that Gaidar's concern was justified and proclaimed that any weakening of Yeltsin would lead to "red Nazism", a common trope used by Yeltsin and his supporters towards oppositional forces.

On 10 March 1999, Russian filmmaker and actor Nikita Mikhalkov was assaulted with rotten eggs for his public support of Kazakh president Nursultan Nazarbayev, whom the NBP accused of oppressing the Russian diaspora. In return, Mikhalkov stormed into the audience and kicked one of the activists in the head giving him serious injuries, which awarded the activists public sympathy.

On 24 August 1999, sixteen NBP activists occupied a tower of the Sailors' Club in Sevastopol on Ukraine's Independence Day, hanging the party flag from the building and distributing leaflets. The protest was performed under the slogan "Sevastopol is a Russian city!" and aimed against "Ukraine's occupation of Sevastopol, the State Duma's ratification of the treaty with Ukraine, and Ukraine's accession to NATO." The occupation lasted for over two hours until the building was stormed by Russian marines from the Black Sea Fleet and the activists were arrested by Ukrainian police. Some of the activists were sentenced to prison.

On 17 November 2000, NBP activists seized the belltower of St. Peter's Church in Riga, threatening to detonate a hand grenade and demanding that the Latvian government "immediately release all Soviet war veterans languishing behind bars, grant equal rights to Russians in Latvia, and renounce the bid to join NATO" as well as release NBP members in custody in Latvia. During the occupation, the activists unfurled an NBP flag from the tower and a banner with the slogan, "Freedom for our veterans". After two hours, the activists surrendered, and it was later revealed that the grenade was a fake. Three of the activists, all Russian citizens, were charged with terrorism, but during the trial, their charges were reduced to hooliganism; they were extradited to Russia and released by 2003.

During Prince Charles' tour of the Baltic states in 2001, a member of the Latvian branch of the NBP hit Charles' face with a flower in an act of protest against the war in Afghanistan. During the 2002 Prague summit, two NBP members threw tomatoes at Secretary General of NATO George Robertson, shouting, "NATO is worse than the Gestapo", "no to the expansion of NATO", and "the blood of children is on your hands" in Russian.

On 11 September 2002, 30 NBP activists protested in front of the residence of US ambassador Sandy Vershbow on the anniversary of the September 11 attacks, dedicating it to the "kamikaze-heroes" and proclaiming "solidarity with all rogue states".

On 29 October 2003, NBP members threw tomatoes at CPRF chairman Gennady Zyuganov for "misleading the public" and "wearing expensive shoes" which, according to the NBP activists, cost more than a Russian teacher's annual salary

On 3 December 2003, NBP activists occupied the roof of the Ministry of Justice building in Moscow as a protest against the Ministry's fifth refusal to register the NBP as a political party and unfair elections. Some activists forced their way inside and attempted to deliver a petition for registration to Minister of Justice Yury Chaika, while others held a rally by the entrance of the building. The activists hung banners from the roof with the slogans "Freedom or death!" and "We will teach you to love the constitution!". The activists were detained after the protest.

On 3 March 2004, NBP members occupied the United Russia headquarters in Moscow in protest against Putin and government policy. All protestors, as well as Kommersant correspondent Oleg Kashin, were detained afterward. On 22 June 2004, NBP activists occupied the German Industrial Trade Center in Moscow on the anniversary of the German invasion of the Soviet Union, unfurling a banner with the inscription, "Never forget! Never forgive!" and chanting "Russia is everything, everything else is nothing" and "Putin is a German spy." On 2 August 2004, a group of NBP members occupied the Ministry of Health and Social Development building in Moscow in protest against social benefits reform. During the occupation, they stormed the office of Minister of Health Mikhail Zurabov, who was not there at the time. Police arrested most of the participants, and on 12 December 2004, seven activists were found guilty of "hooliganism and intentional damage to property" and each sentenced to five years in prison. On 14 December 2004, NBP members occupied the presidential-administration visitors' room to protest against government policy. Police arrested thirty-nine activists, with many of them being sentenced to prison.

On 25 September 2006, National Bolsheviks occupied the Ministries of Finances building in Moscow to protest against liberal economic policy.

== International groups ==
The National Bolshevik Party founded branches across the post-Soviet states. The most active branches outside of Russia were in Latvia, Ukraine, and Belarus. Several small associated groups, often made up of Russian immigrants, also existed in countries across Europe and North America. Most of them did not have official registration.

=== Israel ===
An Israeli chapter of the NBP, known as Another Israel, was active in the mid-2000s. It was influenced by Eurasianism, supporting Israel on the grounds that it is geopolitically located in "Eurasia", while also maintaining a critical stance of the government of Ariel Sharon. They were in close contact with the Russian branch.

=== Latvia ===
Latvia's NBP has had members hold office in Riga, and has executed notable publicity stunts, but it remains largely marginal there. The Latvian branch has been led by Vladimir Linderman and Benes Ayo. In 2003, Linderman was accused of storing explosives and of calling for the overthrow of the political system. He left Latvia and moved to Russia. In 2005, during the visit of George W. Bush in Latvia, local national Bolsheviks and the Vanguard of Red Youth organized meetings "against American imperialism". Police broke up a demonstration and arrested its participants. The Latvian NBP was also active in anti-capitalist demonstrations and in anti-Nazi blockades during Remembrance Day of the Latvian Legionnaires.

=== Moldova ===
A chapter of the NBP existed in Moldova.

=== Sweden ===
A chapter of the NBP existed in Sweden.

=== Ukraine ===
Largely based in Eastern Ukraine, the NBP initially joined forces with other small parties and signed a "Declaration of the Kiev Council of Slav Radical Nationalists" together with Ukrainian nationalists. Later, Ukrainian National Bolsheviks participated in demonstrations against Ukrainian nationalists on the anniversary of the founding of the Ukrainian Insurgent Army. National Bolsheviks also organized actions against the rapprochement of Ukraine–NATO relations. During the Orange Revolution, the Ukrainian NBP decided to remain neutral. National Bolsheviks also formed armed troop interbrigades and participated in the war in Donbas.

=== United States ===
An NBP chapter existed in the United States around 2005. It espoused a Third Positionist worldview, describing itself as "Beyond the Left and Right" and rejecting both capitalism and Marxism.

== Controversy ==
Critics of the NBP in both Russia and the West commented on the party's heavy use of totalitarian and fascist symbols. Some academics have described the group as neo-fascist. In the Russian media, the National Bolshevik Party was usually referred to as a far-left youth movement; however, some critics (including ex-members) allege that the NBP was dedicated to committing a colour revolution in Russia. Co-founder Yegor Letov distanced himself from the NBP and criticized their activities as "a kind of provocation directed at oneself - as in the case of Limonov, for example."

== Notable members ==
=== Current ===
Until banning of the NBP in 2007

- Zakhar Prilepin
- Vladimir Linderman
- Benes Ayo
- Sergei Aksenov
- Aleksandr Averin
- Andrei Dmitriev
- Sergei Fomchenkov
- Taisiya Osipova
- Maxim Gromov

=== Former ===
- Aleksandr Dugin
- Taras Rabko
- Roman Konoplev
- Dmitry Revyakin
- Sergei "Pauk" Troitsky
- Alexei Tsvetkov
- Slava Mogutin
- Sergey Shnurov
- Oleg Sudakov

=== Deceased ===
- Eduard Limonov
- Yegor Letov
- Aleksandr Nepomnyashchiy
- Natalya Medvedeva
- Aleksandr Dolmatov
- Yuriy Chervochkin
- Andrei Sukhorada
- Sergey Kuryokhin
- Aleksandr Lebedev-Frontov

== Media depictions ==
=== Films ===
- Sud nad prizrakom (2002)
- Saratov (2002)
- Fuck off Mr. Bond! (2002)
- Da, smert (2004)
- Zuby drakona (2005)
- Les Enfants terribles de Vladimir Vladimirovitch Poutine (2006)
- The Revolution That Wasn't (2008)
- Utopie Russe (2014)
- Can't Get You Out of My Head (2021)
- Limonov: The Ballad (2024)
- The Wizard of the Kremlin (2026)

=== Books ===
By Eduard Limonov

- Anatomy of a Hero (1997)
- My Political Biography (2002)
- Russian Psycho (2003)
- The Other Russia (2003)

By other authors

- Ultranormalnost (2005), a novel by Natan Dubovitskiy
- Generation of Limonka (2005), a collection of short stories by multiple young Russian authors
- The Gospel of the Extremist (2005), a novel by Roman Konoplev
- Sankya (2006), a novel by Zakhar Prilepin
- The Way of the Hongweibin (2006), a novel by Dmitri Zhvaniya
- A Russian Diary: A Journalist's Final Account of Life, Corruption, and Death in Putin's Russia a book by Anna Politkovskaya
- Truth of the Trenches of the Chechen War (2007), a collection of articles by multiple Russian authors
- 12 Who Don't Agree (2009), a non-fiction book by Valery Panyushkin
- Girls of the Party (2011), a photo-album by Sergei Belyak
- Limonka to Prison (2012), a novel by NBP political prisoners
- Limonov (2011), a biographical novel by Emmanuel Carrère
- Religion of the Furious (2013), a novel by Ekaterina Rysk
- The Wizard of the Kremlin (2022), a novel by Giuliano da Empoli

=== Other ===
- Orda, a comic book by Igor Baranko

== Bibliography ==
- The Beast Reawakens (1997) by Martin A. Lee
