= Maxim Gromov =

Russian politician (born 1973)

- Максим Громов
- Born: 1973 (age 52–53); Lipetsk, Soviet Union
- Occupations: politician, publicist
- Known for: human rights activist, political prisoner
- Political party: National Bolshevik Party; The Other Russia
- Movement: Non-system opposition

Maxim Alexandrovich Gromov (Russian: Макси́м Алекса́ндрович Гро́мов; born 1973) is a Russian political dissident, human rights activist, former political prisoner, publicist, member of National Bolshevik Party since 1999 and one of the leaders of the political party The Other Russia. He is also the leader of the human rights organization Prisoners' Union.

== Oppositional activities ==
In 2000 Gromov sewed his lips shut in protest over censorship in Russia. On 14 September 2003 Gromov was part of a group of 16 national-bolsheviks who occupied a train in Lithuania. Gromov was detained and stayed under arrest for 40 days. On 3 December 2003 Gromov was part of a group of national-bolsheviks who occupied the office of the Ministry of Justice in protest against political repressions in Russia.

On 2 August 2004 he participated in a non-violent direct action in protest of the cancellation of social benefits in Russia, where he was part of a group of national-bolsheviks who occupied the office of the Minister of Health Mikhail Zurabov. During this protest, he tossed a portrait of Vladimir Putin out of a window. On 20 December 2004 was sentenced by the Russian courts to 5 years in prison. On 1 August 2007 Gromov was released from prison.

In 2008 Gromov cofounded the non-governmental organization Prisoners' Union.

Since 2009 Gromov has taken part in the actions of Strategy-31, a series of civic protests in support of the right to peaceful assembly in Russia. On 31 July 2011 he was arrested during the action, during which he was beaten by police and hospitalized.

In 2011 Gromov initiated the art project "Children of prisoners of conscience".
