= Nepomnyashchiy =

Nepomnyashchiy (Russian: Непо́мнящий) is a male Russian surname that has a large number of transliterations. Its feminine counterpart is Nepomnyashchaya (Russian: Непомнящая). Notable people with the surname include:

- Aleksandr Nepomnyashchiy (1968–2007), Russian poet and singer
- Aleksey Nepomniaschiy (born 1980), Russian and Ukrainian journalist
- Alex Nepomniaschy, American cinematographer
- Ian Nepomniachtchi (born 1990), Russian chess grandmaster
- Valery Nepomnyashchy (born 1943) Russian association football player and manager
