= Benes Ayo =

Russian National Bolshevik (born 1979)

- Бенес Айо
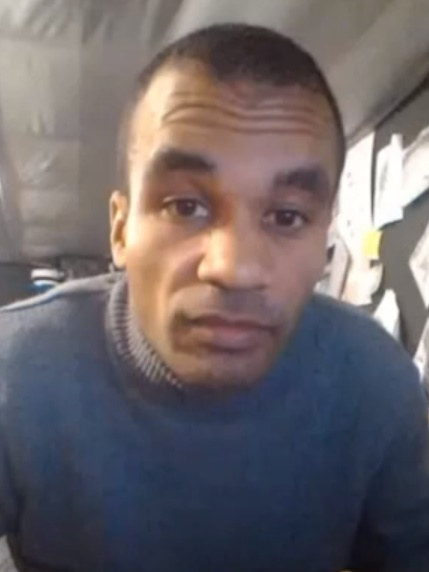
- Ayo in 2020

Personal details
- Born: 8 June 1979 (age 47) Riga, Latvian SSR, Soviet Union
- Citizenship: Latvia (until 2023); Russia (since 2022)
- Party: The Other Russia of E. V. Limonov
- Other political affiliations: National Bolshevik Party (1998–2007); Communist Party of Great Britain (Marxist–Leninist) (in the United Kingdom, from c. 2006); Communist Party of the Russian Federation (from c. 2021)
- Education: University of Latvia (BSc); Birkbeck, University of London (MMSc)
- Occupation: Political activist
- Known for: National Bolshevik activism
- Nickname: Black Lenin

Military service
- Allegiance: Russia: Donetsk People's Republic; Luhansk People's Republic
- Branch/service: Interbrigades
- Years of service: 2014–present
- Battles/wars: Russo-Ukrainian War; 2014 pro-Russian unrest in Ukraine; Annexation of Crimea; War in Donbas; Russian invasion of Ukraine; Southern front

Benes Khristoferovich Ayo (Russian: Бенес Христоферович Айо, Latvian: Beness Aijo; born 8 June 1979), also known by his nickname "Black Lenin" (Russian: Чёрный Ленин), is a Latvian-born Russian National Bolshevik activist and soldier. He has been active in the National Bolshevik movement since 1998 and has been repeatedly arrested and imprisoned for his political activities in various countries.

Born in the city of Riga to a Russian mother and a Ugandan father, Ayo spent most of his early life in Latvia before moving to the United Kingdom to pursue his master's degree at Birkbeck College, University of London. He joined the Communist Party of Great Britain (Marxist–Leninist) during his time in London and participated in many of the party's demonstrations.

In 2014, Ayo travelled to Crimea to support the Russian annexation of the peninsula. He later participated in pro-Russian demonstrations in the Donbas before being arrested by Ukrainian authorities and deported to Latvia. Ayo fled Latvia in 2015 despite being under criminal investigation and police surveillance. He eventually made his way to the Luhansk People's Republic, where he joined The Other Russia's paramilitary group, the Interbrigades. He later received a passport from the Donetsk People's Republic, which he used to enter Russia in early 2020. The Russian government granted Ayo political asylum in October 2020 and Russian citizenship in December 2022. The Latvian government revoked Ayo's Latvian citizenship in response to the latter.

== Biography ==
=== Early life and activism ===
Beness Khristoferovich Ayo was born in Riga on 8 June 1979 to a Ugandan father and a Russian mother. He studied biology at the University of Latvia. He is an Orthodox Old Believer.

On 7 May 2005, Ayo was arrested for setting off smoke bombs during the visit of George W. Bush to Latvia. Later that year, Ayo was arrested and sentenced to 9 months in prison for calling for the overthrow of Latvia's political system. In prison, Ayo subsequently went on a hunger strike that lasted for 27 days until his health deteriorated enough to require hospitalisation. After spending five and a half months in jail, his security measure was changed from imprisonment to police surveillance at Ayo's request, when he cited his diabetes.

Thereafter, Ayo left Latvia and moved to London in the United Kingdom. He studied Medical Microbiology at the University of London, Birkbeck. Later in London, Ayo worked as a construction worker at the Heathrow Terminal 2. He played an active role in political rallies in the UK, where he was a member of the Communist Party of Great Britain (Marxist–Leninist).

From May–June 2013 he was in Palestine, where he took part in actions against the Israeli government. While in Palestine Ayo received medical training in the field.

On 14 September 2013, in Moscow, Ayo participated in the congress of the political party The Other Russia. On 19 November 2013, Ayo participated in London in a direct action in memory of Aleksandr Dolmatov. On 29 November 2013, he organized in The Hague further direct action in memory of Dolmatov. Beness was arrested and spent six weeks in a Dutch prison.

=== Involvement in pro-Russian unrest in Ukraine ===
Ayo departed for Crimea in 2014. He was arrested in Donetsk on 1 April 2014 for "preparation of an armed coup to overthrow the government and to undermine the territorial integrity of Ukraine" and deported to the United Kingdom, where Ayo took part of demonstrations for a couple of weeks.

In May 2014, despite the ban from entering the country for three years, Ayo attempted to cross into Ukraine together with two more activists. He was detained by the Ukrainian Border Guard, and deported to Latvia, where he was detained by the Security Police and the State Police at Riga Airport. Ayo made claims he had been tortured and beaten by the Ukrainian National Guard.

On 16 May 2014, the Riga Central District Court ordered Ayo taken into custody and the Security Police commenced criminal prosecution for incitement to violently overthrow the government of Latvia, to change the political system, and to liquidate Latvian national independence. On the night to 30 May petards and smoke grenades were thrown at the Latvian general consulate in St. Petersburg by members of The Other Russia party, who set up a Soviet flag on the façade of the building, distributed pamphlets and demanded release of Ayo.

Ayo has participated in several demonstrations in Riga since, including the 15 August demonstration against Latvia's foreign policy towards Russia and to call for the dismissal of Minister of Foreign Affairs Edgars Rinkēvičs.

In early 2015, with an ongoing criminal case and while being under police surveillance Ayo fled Latvia by hitch-hiking to Tallinn, where he took a ferry to Finland and then traveled to Russia by bus, eventually arriving in Eastern Ukraine. There he joined the armed forces of the self-proclaimed Luhansk People's Republic in what he described as "military-political work", i.e., writing articles for a local newspaper, but he also expressed a desire to undergo training and sign up for active service. Riga Central District Court subsequently launched a manhunt for Ayo.

Ayo later reported taking part in pro-Russian operations in Debaltseve and near Stanytsia Luhanska among other places and being promoted to sergeant, going from a gunner on an artillery howitzer to a member of a motorized infantry brigade. In the middle of April 2019, Ayo was declared a suspect by the Latvia's State Security Service in a case regarding illegal participation in the pro-Russian unrest in Ukraine.

In early 2020, Ayo entered Russia using a passport from the unrecognised Donetsk People's Republic. He was later detained in Yarensk, Arkhangelsk Oblast, where Ayo was planning to take part in a protest against the construction of a garbage landfill. The Latvian Prosecutor General's Office requested his extradition to Latvia, while Ayo asked Vladimir Putin for political asylum in Russia. Ayo was released from prison in February 2020 and granted political asylum in Russia in October.

Ayo joined the Communist Party of the Russian Federation some time after 2020, according to the party's website.

On 17 May 2021, a Latvian court in Riga found Ayo guilty of "calling for the violent overthrow of the government, the liquidation of Latvian independence, and the undermining of the territorial integrity of Latvia". He was sentenced in absentia to two years and six months in prison, as well as one year of probation.

In December 2022, Ayo was granted Russian citizenship. On 6 February 2023, the Latvian Citizenship and Migration Affairs Office revoked Ayo's Latvian citizenship.
