= Suicide of Aleksandr Dolmatov =

Russian activist (1976–2013)

Aleksandr Yuryevich Dolmatov (Russian: Алекса́ндр Ю́рьевич Долма́тов; 12 September 1976 – 17 January 2013 Rotterdam) was a Russian opposition activist. Dolmatov killed himself in a Dutch detention centre.

== Biography ==
Dolmatov was born on 12 September 1976. In 2004 he took a job at a government-owned defense firm Tactical Missiles Corporation.

== Oppositional activities ==
Dolmatov was a member of the unregistered National Bolshevik Party and the opposition party The Other Russia.

Beginning in 2010 Dolmatov took part in all actions of Strategy-31, a series of civic protests in Moscow. Dolmatov was repeatedly detained during Strategy-31 actions.

Dolmatov had participated in the so-called "March of Millions", an opposition demonstration on 6 May 2012 which resulted in clashes with police. Dolmatov was detained by police.

== Death ==
Dolmatov went to the Netherlands in June 2012, fearing arrest in Russia. He sought political asylum there, but in December the Immigration and Naturalisation Service turned down his application. Dolmatov was found dead in a Rotterdam deportation centre early on 17 January 2013.

On 18 April 2013, the State Secretary for the Security and Justice, Fred Teeven, survived a vote of no confidence on his handling of asylum seekers; the debate was called following a Dutch government agency investigation of the suicide of Dolmatov found that multiple parts of the Dutch immigration system failed him, including medical, legal and state organizations.

== Reactions ==
On 18 January 2013, opposition activists picketed the Dutch Embassy in Moscow and Saint Petersburg, Russia and Kyiv, Ukraine in memory of Aleksandr Dolmatov. Some observers remained convinced that Dolmatov killed himself under duress after being approached twice by secret police.

Dolmatov's lawyer Yevgeny Arkhipov criticised the Dutch decision to place him in a deportation centre.

Russia's Foreign Ministry said it had demanded the Netherlands investigate Aleksandr Dolmatov's death. In an interview on 10 February Russian Foreign Minister Sergey Lavrov said that Dolmatov was a Russian citizen, and it absolutely did not matter what were his political views. According to him, Foreign Ministry defends Russian citizens regardless of their political views as this is the statutory requirement and moral, not just official, duty. On 11 April he called Alexander Dolmatov's case "a tragedy of no minor importance".

The Dutch ambassador to Moscow said that Dolmatov's death was not triggered by the refusal to grant him asylum in the Netherlands. The Dutch Queen Beatrix called the suicide of Dolmatov a "great tragedy".

== See also ==
- Murder of Yuriy Chervochkin
