= Panyushkin =

Panyushkin (Russian: Панюшкин) is a gender-neutral Russian surname. Notable people with the surname include:

- Aleksandr Panyushkin (1905–1974), Soviet ambassador to the United States
- Valery Panyushkin (born 1969), Russian journalist and writer
