= Prisoners' Union =

Prisoners' Union may refer to:

- Prisoners Rights Union, a mostly-defunct United States organization
- Prisoners' Union (Russia), a Russian political prisoner organization
