= Sergei Fomchenkov =

Russian politician

- Сергей Фомченков
- Born: 8 December 1973 (age 52); Smolensk, Russian SFSR, Soviet Union
- Spouse: Taisiya Osipova
- Children: 1
- Military career
- Allegiance: Lugansk People's Republic; Donetsk People's Republic; Russia
- Branch: Interbrigades; United Armed Forces of Novorossiya; BARS-13 ("Russian Legion")
- Service years: 2014–present
- Conflicts: Russo-Ukrainian war; War in Donbas (2014–2022); 2022 Russian invasion of Ukraine; 2022 Ukrainian Kharkiv counteroffensive
- Awards: Order of Courage

Sergei Alexandrovich Fomchenkov (Russian: Сергей Александрович Фомченков; born on 8 December 1973) is a Russian politician, a former member of the banned National Bolshevik Party (NBP) and then member of The Other Russia. During the Russo-Ukrainian war, he has been serving as commander of various military units; his call sign is "Fomich" (Russian: ФОМИЧ).

== Biography ==
=== Political career ===
Fomchenkov was head of the Smolensk branch of the NBP since 1998 and later member of its Central Committee. He was one of the organizers of the Dissenters' March. After the dissolution of the NBP in 2007, he was one of its former members who in 2010 established The Other Russia.

=== War in Donbas ===
Fomchenkov was head of the Interbrigades, formed by Russian national-bolsheviks during pro-Russian unrest in Ukraine. He served in the Zarya Battalion and became chief of artillery staff of the 2nd Brigade of the Luhansk People's Republic. Fomchenkov then became commander of the 4th Reconnaissance and Assault Battalion of the Special Forces of the Armed forces of DNR, better known as "Prilepin's Battalion". After the battalion was disbanded in September 2018, Fomchenkov continued to serve in the 9th Marine Regiment of the Armed forces of DNR.

=== 2022 Russian invasion of Ukraine ===
After the beginning of the Russian Invasion of Ukraine Fomchenkov created his own detachment (battalion) from volunteers, the BARS-13. He decided to call it the "Russian Legion" (Russian: Русский легион) as opposed to the different "Georgian" and "Foreign Legions" existing in the Armed Forces of Ukraine. The battalion under his command was almost encircled in Lyman but managed to withdraw to Kreminna during the night between 30 September and 1 October 2022.

On 18 November 2022, Fomchenkov was awarded the Order of Courage.

== Personal life ==
Fomchenkov is married to Russian opposition activist Taisiya Osipova. He has a daughter.
