= Ildar Dadin =

Russian activist (1982–2024)

- Ильдар Дадин
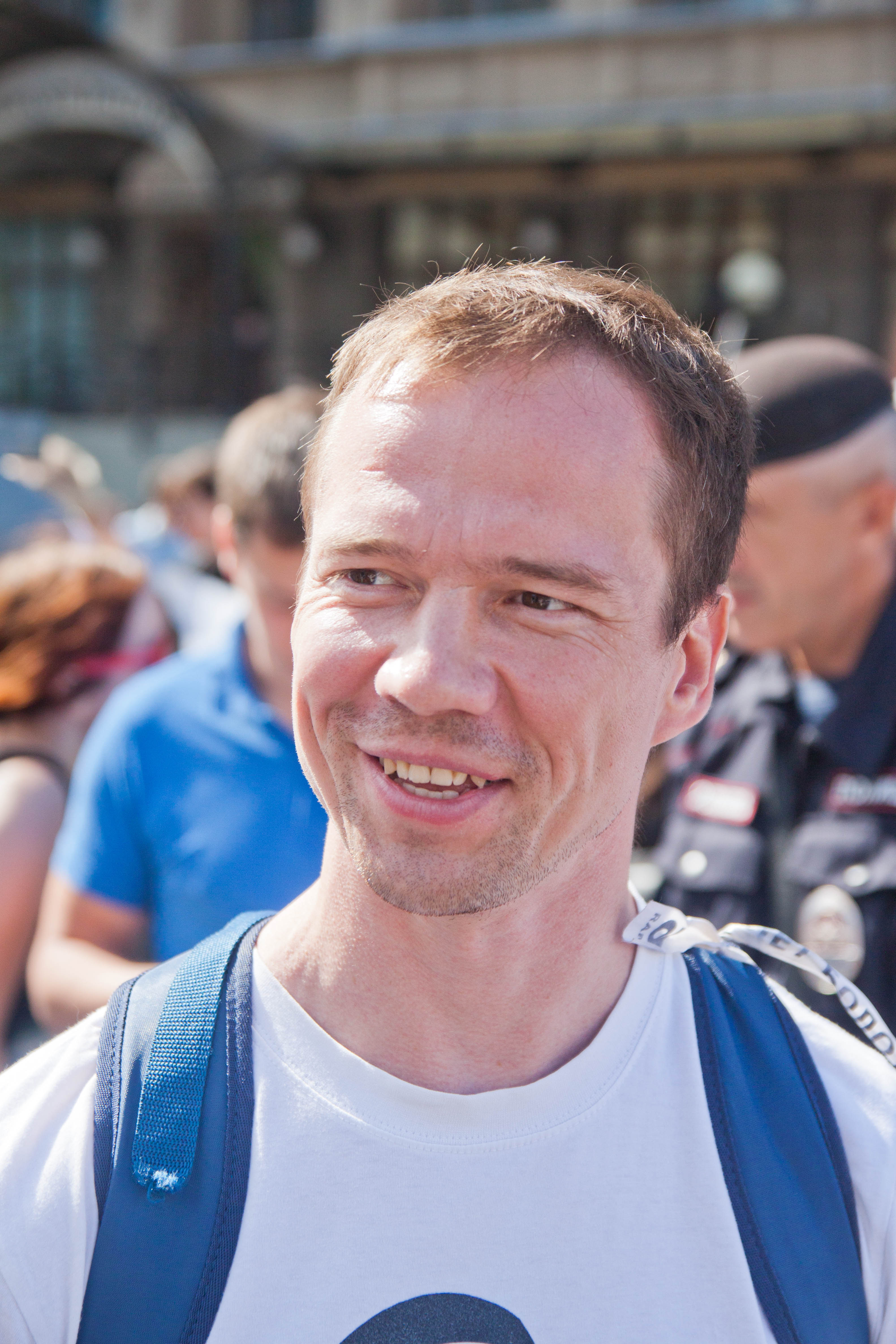
- Dadin in 2017
- Born: 14 April 1982; Zheleznodorozhny, Moscow Oblast, Russian SFSR, USSR
- Died: 5 October 2024 (aged 42); Kharkiv Oblast, Ukraine
- Education: National University of Science and Technology MISiS
- Military Service
- Allegiance: Ukraine
- Branch: International Legion; Sibir Battalion
- Service years: 2023–2024
- Conflicts: Russian invasion of Ukraine †
- Occupations: Activist, dissident

Ildar Ildusovich Dadin (Russian: Ильда́р Ильду́сович Да́дин, Tatar: Илдар Илдус улы Дадин, 14 April 1982 – 5 October 2024) also known by his nom de guerre Gandhi (Ганди) was a Russian opposition activist, accused of violating rules of conducting public demonstrations and hence constantly receiving increased attention from the authorities. He is the first person to spend one year in a penal colony solely for his activism.

Dadin was killed by Russian forces while fighting for Ukraine, in Kharkiv, on 5 October 2024. He was 42.

== Activism and imprisonment ==
According to Amnesty International, Ildar Dadin was a "peaceful opposition activist". Dadin attended rallies in support of the LGBT community (he was not LGBT himself) and opposition figurehead Alexei Navalny, was seen holding a banner saying "Putin is an enemy of the people" at anti-government protests, and also took part in a pro-Maidan protest, the Peace March.

Dadin was arrested on 3 December 2015. He was sentenced to three years in jail by a Moscow court for repeated anti-government street protests.

Between August 2014 and January 2015 Dadin was accused of taking part in four one-person pickets on 6 August, 23 August, 13 September and 5 December 2014. According to Russian law, individual protests do not need authorisation. The criminal case was triggered by his participation on 15 January 2015 in action supporting Alexei Navalny and his brother Oleg in Moscow's Manezhnaya Square. Dadin was sentenced to 15 days jail for “disobeying the lawful demands of the police”.

Before addition of Article 212.1 to Russia's Criminal Code in July 2014 Dadin could be sentenced to pay fine or a suspended prison term. But according to the new Article 212.1, if a court has issued two rulings on administrative offences within 180 days the law opens up a sentence of up to 5 years in a prison colony. This was the decision taken by the Basmanny District Court in Moscow and which condemned Dadin to three years in prison. The prosecutor had asked for a shorter sentence of two years.

The punishment was later reduced to 2.5 years. Dadin was not allowed to be in the court during the appeal case.

He was the first person to be jailed using the law, which was introduced in 2014 and punishes repeated breaches of public assembly rules.

Dadin was sent to the prison and labor camp of Segezha. He claimed to be catching mice in his prison cell, with 8 beds for the 11 inmates.

Ildar Dadin accused the prison of using torture. He described being hit and beaten by 10 to 12 prison employees at the same time, several times per day, for several days, and later having his head forced down into a toilet. Dadin also said that prison workers had hung him by his handcuffs for half an hour and pulled his underwear down, threatening him with rape if he refused to stop a hunger strike he had begun after being deprived of basic necessities such as soap and toilet paper.

The prison confirmed use of force.

Kremlin spokesman Dmitry Peskov said that the case merited "the closest attention" and that President Vladimir Putin would be informed.

Russia's human rights ombudsman Ella Pamfilova criticized the excessive severity of the punishment, promising to send a request to the Constitutional Court. The Presidential Human Rights Council demanded the withdrawal of the article used to imprison Dadin from the Criminal Code.

In 2017, the Supreme Court ordered Dadin to be freed, and he was released from prison on 26 February. The penal colony directorate issued official apology to Dadin and on 31 May 2017 the court agreed to fulfill the lawsuit in favor of Dadin, paying him 2 million rubles (~ $35,000) for unlawful criminal prosecution.

== After release from prison ==
Ildar Dadin joined the Ukrainian Sibir Battalion of the Civic Council to fight for Siberian independence in June 2023. Dadin was reported by family and friends to have been killed after his volunteer battalion came under Russian artillery fire while fighting in Kharkiv Oblast.

== "Dadin's scheme" ==
Ildar Dadin was the first person who was convicted according to new scheme established by the Russian law which subsequently received his name. The essence of this scheme is that some offence is punishable under the Code of the Russian Federation on Administrative Offenses, but second (third, fourth) one, committed during the term of conviction, is punishable under the Criminal Code of the Russian Federation.

This scheme was first use in the article 212.1 which was included into the Criminal Code of Russia on 22 July 2014 when the Federal Law of 21 July 2014 No.258-FZ was officially published. According to the aforementioned article, repeated violation of the established procedure for organising or conducting a gathering, meeting, demonstration, procession, or picket entails criminal sanction. The feature of repetition is defined as a committing of the violations provided by the article 20.2 of the Code of the Russian Federation on Administrative Offenses by a person who has already been prosecuted more than 2 times (i.e. 3 times minimum) for committing the same violations during the period of 180 days.

The constitutionality of such scheme was the subject of Russian Constitutional Court's review. Its Ruling of 10 February No.2-P recognised that the provisions of the article 212.1 of the Criminal Code of Russia don't contradict the Constitution of Russia. In Court's opinion, criminal "corpus delicti with administrative prejudice" doesn't violate the non bis in idem principle. In doing so, the Court pointed out that, firstly, only violation, at the time of committing of which guilty verdicts on administrative offences cases had already entered into force during the period of 180 days preceding it, can be used as grounds for persecution under the Criminal Code of Russia, secondly, only violation which by itself was not used as grounds for persecution under the Code of the Russian Federation on Administrative Offenses can be used as grounds for persecution under the Criminal Code of Russia.

First condition mentioned by the Constitutional Court was not satisfied in the case of Dadin: at the moment of 5 December 2014 when he participated in procession which subsequently was used as grounds for his criminal persecution, only 1 judgement on administrative offence case had entered into force (judgement of 26 September 2014 which was not appealed); 2 other judgements (of 4 and 23 September 2014) entered into force only on 16 March 2015 when these judgements were upheld by the court of appeal. In this regard, the Presidency of the Supreme Court of Russia decided to review his case by its Ruling of 22 February 2017 No.43-P17.

After Russian Constitutional Court's Ruling of 10 February No.2-P, many new articles using the "corpus delicti with administrative prejudice" scheme appeared in the text of Criminal Code of Russia. In doing so, the federal legislator sought to increase a term of conviction of administrative offences and to decrease a minimum number of committed administrative offences required for initiating a criminal prosecution. So, for example, Russian 2022 war censorship laws provide that first call against the use of Russian Armed Forces or the call for sanctions on Russia is punishable under the Code of the Russian Federation on Administrative Offenses, a second one, committed during the term of 1 year, is punishable under the Criminal Code of the Russian Federation.

The "Dadin's scheme" is negatively perceived by lawyers because it allows to criminally persecute on the grounds of judgements on administrative offences cases where facts are established under the significantly simplified procedure in comparison with procedure provided by the Criminal Procedure Code of the Russian Federation.

== See also ==
- Freedom of assembly in Russia
- Human rights in Russia
