= Capital (Ukrainian newspaper) =

Ukrainian newspaper

Capital (Russian: Капитал; Ukrainian: Капітал) is a Ukrainian Russian-language daily business newspaper.

== History ==
The newspaper launched on 8 April 2013 – after the conclusion of the founder and publisher, «Business press of the country» («BPC Group») license agreement with one of the world's best known and most respected publishers in the business press – The Financial Times Ltd. Under the terms of this agreement, newspaper "Capital" publishes selected materials of «Financial Times».

== Editors ==
- Oleksandr Berdynskykh (editor-in-chief)
- Aleksey Nepomniaschiy (main editor)
