= Zelenyye kholmy =

Studio album by Aleksandr Nepomnyashchiy
- Released: 2001
- Recorded: August 5, 2001
- Genre: Author song; rock
- Length: 42:32
- Language: Russian
- Label: Author

Aleksandr Nepomnyashchiy chronology
Porazheniye (2000)	Zelenyye kholmy (2001)	Khleb Zemnoy (2003)

Zelenyye kholmy (Russian: Зелёные холмы, English: Green Hills) is the bootleg recording by the Russian bard Aleksandr Nepomnyashchiy. The album was recorded on the night of August 5, 2001, on the shore of Lake Pleshcheyevo in Pereslavl-Zalessky, immediately after the "Otkrytiye" (English: Discovery) author-song festival.

The release exhibits a marked thematic dichotomy, stemming from the inclusion of songs from both his early period and his later work: existential motifs give way to Orthodox-patriotic sentiments. Music critic Gennady Shostak praised the album's pronounced melodicism, its profound lyrical and philosophical lyrics, and the sincerity of the performance. He also drew attention to the depiction of a swastika on the insert, a symbol whose interpretation remains ambiguous.

Five of the tracks were later re-recorded for Nepomnyashchiy's final studio album released during his lifetime, Khleb Zemnoy (Bread of the Earth), released in 2003.

== Track listing ==
No.	Title	Length
1.	"Dorogi svobody ("Roads of Freedom")"	3:10
2.	"Doroga domoy ("Way home")"	2:48
3.	"Inkvizitsiya ("Inquisition")"	4:56
4.	"Po odnomu ("One by One")"	5:01
5.	"Deyaniya ("Acts")"	2:35
6.	"Avtostopnaya 3 ("Hitchhiking 3")"	5:31
7.	"Maslenitsa"	3:28
8.	"Matritsa ("The Matrix")"	4:03
9.	"Skvoz’ kamennoye nebo ("Through the Stone Sky")"	3:45
10.	"Khleb zemnoy ("Bread of the Earth")"	6:01
Total length:		41:18

== Personnel ==
- Aleksandr Nepomnyashchiy – vocals, guitars
- A. Vlasov – sound engineering
- Ekaterina Ishkova – first edition artist
