= Sergei Aksenov =

Russian politician (born 1971)

- Сергей Аксёнов
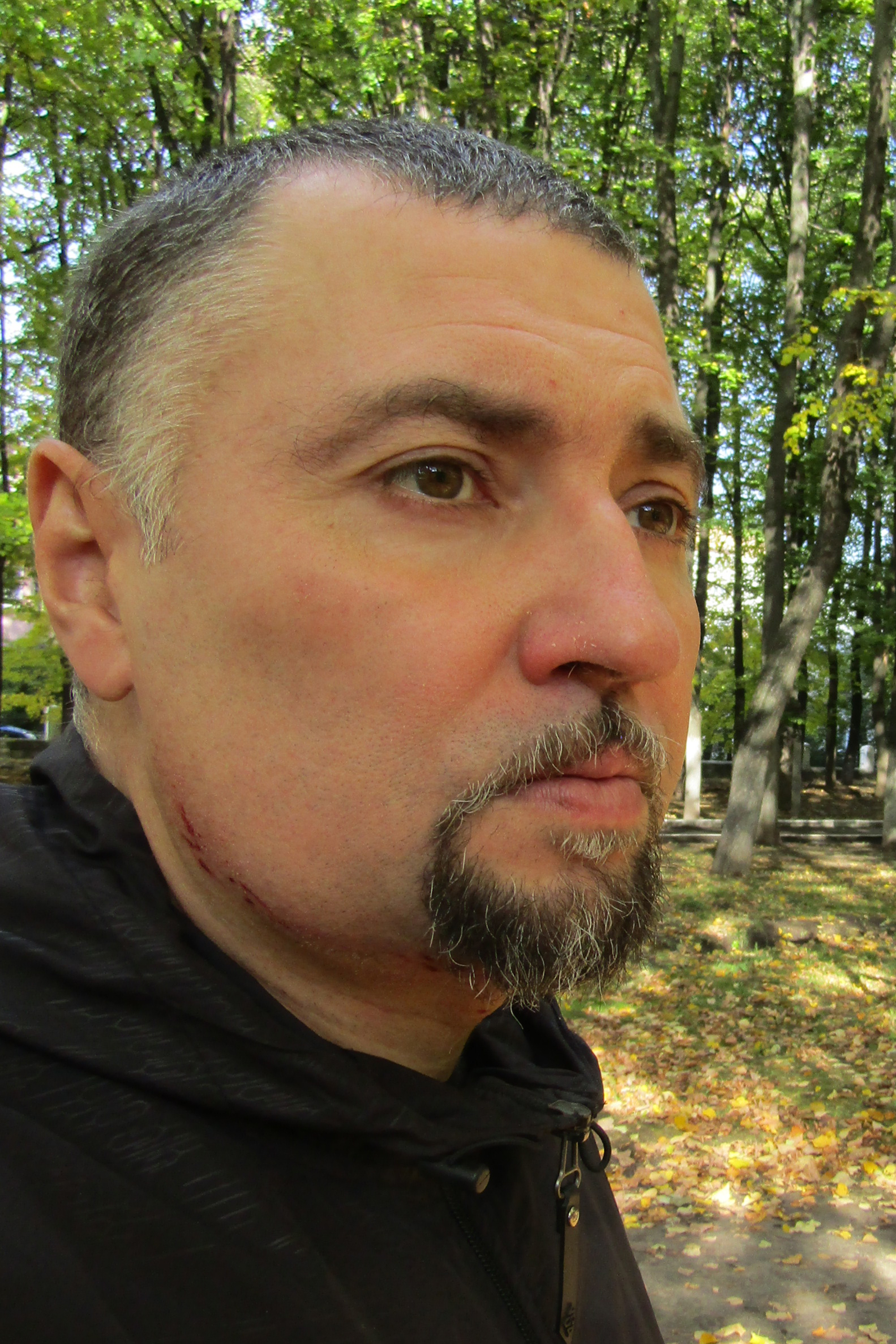
- Aksenov in 2018
- Born: 3 April 1971 (age 55); Vladimir, Russian SFSR, Soviet Union
- Occupations: Politician; publicist
- Known for: Russian opposition activist
- Political party: National Bolshevik Party; The Other Russia
- Movement: Non-system opposition Dissenters' March; Strategy-31
- Children: 2
- Website: www.grani.ru/users/aksenov/entries/

Sergei Alexandrovich Aksenov (Russian: Сергей Александрович Аксёнов; born 3 April 1971) is a Russian political dissident, publicist, former prisoner, member of National Bolshevik Party since 1997, cofounder of coalition The Other Russia and one of the leaders of the political party The Other Russia.

== Biography ==
Sergei Aksenov was born in Vladimir. He had studied in Moscow State University of Economics. In 1997 Aksenov was a member of the National Bolshevik Party. Aksenov was jailed in April 2001 on charges of terrorism, forced overthrow of the constitutional order, and illegal purchasing of weapons. Since 2004, Aksenov is a member of the Central Committee of the National Bolshevik Party. In 2008, Aksenov was one of the organizers of the Dissenters' March. In 2009, Aksenov was one of the organizers of the Strategy-31. In 2010, Aksenov became a cofounder of political party The Other Russia.
