= Freedom of assembly in Russia =

Freedom of assembly in Russia is granted by Article 31 of the Constitution adopted in 1993, where it states that citizens of the Russian Federation shall have the right to gather peacefully, without weapons, and to hold meetings, rallies, demonstrations, marches and pickets. In practice, the right to freedom of assembly is restricted by Russian authorities. According to a Russian law introduced in 2014, a fine or detention of up to 15 days may be given for holding a demonstration without the permission of authorities and prison sentences of up to five years may be given for three breaches. Single-person pickets have resulted in fines and a three-year prison sentence.

== Legislation ==
Between 1991 and 2004, demonstrations in Russia were regulated by a decree first issued by the Supreme Soviet in 1988 and reaffirmed, with minor modifications, by presidential decrees in 1992 and 1993. In 2004 these were replaced by the Federal Law of the Russian Federation No.54-FZ "On Meetings, Rallies, Demonstrations, Marches and Pickets" (current version signed into law by the President of Russia on 19 June 2004, and came into force on 4 July 2004). If the assembly in public is expected to involve more than one participant, its organisers are obliged to notify executive or local self-government authorities of the upcoming event few days in advance in writing. However, legislation does not foresee an authorisation procedure, hence the authorities have no right to prohibit an assembly or change its place unless it threatens the security of participants or is planned to take place near hazardous facilities, important railways, viaducts, pipelines, high voltage electric power lines, prisons, courts, presidential residences or in the border control zone. The right to gather can also be restricted in close proximity of cultural and historical monuments.

The regional and local authorities can issue secondary regulations, but limitations and prohibitions on public events can only be introduced by Federal Laws. Organisers will be subjected to administrative responsibility for violating a procedure according to Art. 20 of the Administrative Offences Code.

In June 2012, the Russian parliament voted on legislation that sought to raise the fixed fines for holding unsanctioned demonstrations from 5,000 rubles (around $150) to 300,000 rubles (around $10,000) for individual participants and increase to 600,000 rubles for rally organizers. The fine for the demonstration organizers that fail to comply with federal regulations on demonstrations were to increase from 50,000 rubles ($1,160) to 1.5 million rubles ($48,000). Also, protesters would be prohibited to wear masks, carry weapons or objects that could be used as weapons. Rallies cannot be organized by citizens, who have been convicted of a breach of public peace and security or have been subject to administrative penalties for rally violations twice or more times within a year.

Since 2014, holding a demonstration without the permission of authorities, even a peaceful single-person picket, is punishable by a fine or detention of up to 15 days, or up to five years in prison if it is the third breach.

== Statistics ==
According to the statistics released by the Russian Ministry of Internal Affairs,

30,000 public actions took place in Russia in 2009; political claims were sounded on 2,500 of them. 5.5 million people participated in those rallies. 440 actions were not negotiated on with the authorities, more than 20,000 people took part in them. Road traffic was blocked 56 times.

== Controversies ==
The government in practice generally has not respected this right. In May 2005 Moscow police, after breaking up a demonstration in front of city hall, detained 10 congregants and supporters of the Emmanuel Pentecostal Church. Members and supporters of the church continued to demonstrate, alleging discrimination by authorities who had refused the church permission to construct a church and renovate buildings in Moscow and another district. In June 2005 several of these demonstrators were arrested during a demonstration. City authorities contended that the demonstrations were illegal and that they had advised the demonstrators to hold their protests at an alternate site. Protestors said that the demonstration was legal and that they had never received such instructions from city authorities. Several protestors were charged with holding an illegal demonstration and sentenced to five‑day jail terms. A Moscow district court ruled in November 2005, that local authorities had violated the legal procedure for regulating public events in its handling of the Church's repeated demonstrations. The same court ruled in October 2005 that 13 police officers had wrongfully detained Emmanuel members following a demonstration a week earlier. The church pastor confirmed that police interference ended following these court decisions.

In May 2006 gay rights activists were denied their applications to hold a gay pride event, Moscow Pride.

In the days before the Other Russia political opposition conference in Moscow in July 2006, according to Human Rights Watch, authorities tried to bar conference attendees from leaving their home cities violently.

During the 32nd G8 summit in St. Petersburg in July 2006, human rights activists claimed 577 alleged incidents of illegal action by law enforcement officials against protestors, including 94 cases of police taking person to police stations without explanation; 267 cases (three involving children) of temporary detention on trumped‑up charges such as "minor hooliganism," "verbal abuse," and "resistance to law enforcement officials"; and 216 cases of persons prevented from traveling by bus or train to St. Petersburg for a "counter summit" organized by Russian NGOs.

After organizing a picket in Moscow on 3 September 2006, in commemoration of the victims of Beslan school hostage crisis, human rights activist Lev Ponomaryov was arrested and detained for three days, arbitrary and illegally, according to human rights organizations, as he had submitted the required notification prior to the event, but chosen not to observe the subsequent recommendation that it take place elsewhere or on a different date.

On 16 October 2006, police in Nazran violently broke up a rally in memory of Anna Politkovskaya, killed on 7 October, and detained activists.

=== Dissenters' March ===
Authorities banned most of the Marches of the Discontented, which took place on 16 December 2006, in Moscow, on 3 March 2007, in Saint Petersburg, on 24 March 2007, in Nizhny Novgorod, on 14 April 2007, for the second time in Moscow, on 15 April 2007, again in Saint Petersburg, on 18 May in Samara and on 19 May in Chelyabinsk, or proposed to change their place. As protesters defied the bans, riot police (OMON) beaten or detained scores of opposition activists during the demonstrations, detaining or taking off trains and buses some expected participants in advance (see Dissenters March).

On 17 December 2006, Moscow city authorities prohibited approximately 300 members of the political party Yabloko and their supporters from marching in memory of killed journalists. Yabloko was allowed to meet, however, but was refused a permit to march.

=== Moscow Pride ===
On 27 May 2007, a gay rights demonstration banned by Yury Luzhkov as "satanic" was held in Moscow again and for the second year running.

On 1 June 2008, another gay pride event took place in Moscow, again banned by the City Mayor.

The 2009 edition of Moscow Pride took place on 16 May 2009, the same day as the finals of the 2009 Eurovision Song Contest being hosted by Moscow, and the eve of the International Day Against Homophobia. The parade was called "Slavic Pride", as it will promote gay rights and culture from across the entire Slavic regions of Europe. Again, authorization was refused.

=== Prisoners of Bolotnaya ===
The day before the inauguration of President Putin, peaceful protesters against elections to Bolotnaya Square in Moscow were halted by police. 19 protesters faced criminal charges in connection with events characterized by authorities as "mass riots". Several leading political activists were named as witnesses in the case and had their homes searched in operations that were widely broadcast by state-controlled television channels. Over 6 and 7 May, hundreds of peaceful individuals were arrested across Moscow.

Amnesty demanded that all 10 prisoners of conscience (POCs) in this case must be immediately and unconditionally released, and any charges relating to the purported "mass riots" must be dropped in relation to all defendants and persons under investigation in this case.

"The release of businessman Mikhail Khodorkovsky, the Pussy Riot singers Maria Alyokhina and Nadezhda Tolokonnikova, and a handful of Bolotnaya case detainees (three) should not been seen as a benign act of clemency, but a politically expedient move in the run up to the Sochi Olympics," said John Dalhuisen, Director at Amnesty International. "Those that have been released were imprisoned solely for expressing their views. While they are now free, the charges against them remain. The amnesty is no substitute for an effective justice system."

== Strategy-31 ==
Since 31 July 2009 rallies for the freedom of assembly have been taking place on Triumfalnaya Square in Moscow. They are held every 31st day of the month, in which such day exists. This concept, called Strategy-31, has been proposed by Eduard Limonov and supported by various opposition movements and human-rights organisations, including the Moscow Helsinki Group headed by Lyudmila Alexeyeva. Since 2010 rallies and pickets for the freedom of assembly have been held also in other Russian cities. As of 31 March, no rally in Moscow or St.Petersburg has been allowed by the authorities. The police have dispersed and detained participants.

== Single-person pickets ==
In May 2015, two activists received ten-day jail sentences for one-person pickets in Moscow's Bolotnaya Square. In June 2015, a court in Murmansk fined a woman 20,000 roubles for holding an unsanctioned demonstration on 1 March – a silent one-person rotating commemoration of Boris Nemtsov. A Moscow court fined a man 10,000 roubles for his one-person picket against Ramzan Kadyrov.

In December 2015, Ildar Dadin was sentenced to three years in prison for several single-person pickets in 2014. Amnesty International stated, "The shocking sentencing of Ildar Dadin shows that the Russian authorities are using the law on public assemblies to fast-track peaceful protesters to prison".

== International responses ==
In May 2016, Lithuania granted asylum to Irina Kalmykova after Russia accused her of taking part in unsanctioned demonstrations and sent her documents to Interpol.

== See also ==
- Human rights in Russia
- Nikolay Alexeyev
- LGBT Human Rights Project Gayrussia.ru
