= Sergei Belyak =

Russian lawyer, musician, photographer

- Born: May 19, 1958 (age 66); Podolsk, USSR
- Citizenship: Russia
- Occupation(s): Fine art photographer. lawyer, musician

Sergei Belyak (Russian: Сергей Беляк; May 19, 1958) is a Russian lawyer, musician, photographer.

== Biography ==
Sergei Belyak was born in Podolsk in 1958. He studied on Saratov State Academy of Law

== Law practice ==
Belyak served as lawyer for Vladimir Zhirinovsky, Yury Shutov, Andrei Klimentev and others.

Belyak served as lawyer for Eduard Limonov. In 2003 court granted the early release of National Bolshevik Party leader In 2003, Limonov was released from Lefortovo Prison.

== Personal life ==
Sergei Belyak is musician. He is also an author of photo album "Girls of the Party" and autobiography "The Devil's advocate".
