= 12 Who Don't Agree =

2009 book by Valery Panyushkin

- First edition (Russian)
- Author: Valery Panyushkin
- Original title: 12 несогласных
- Translator: Marian Schwartz
- Language: Russian
- Publisher: Zakharov Books
- Publication date: 2009
- Publication place: Russia
- English publication date: 2011
- Pages: 224
- ISBN: 978-1-6094-5010-6

12 Who Don't Agree (Russian: 12 несогласных) is a 2009 non-fiction book by the Russian writer Valery Panyushkin. The book is based on the life of Russian opposition activists.

12 Who Don't Agree was published in 2009 in Zakharov Books (Russia). This book was also published in English translation in 2011 in Europa Editions.

== Characters ==
- Marina Litvinovich
- Vissarion Aseev
- Anatoliy Ermolin
- Maria Gaidar
- Ilya Yashin
- Sergei Udaltsov
- Maxim Gromov
- Natalia Morar
- Victor Shenderovich
- Andrey Illarionov
- Garry Kasparov
- Valery Panyushkin – author of the book

== Overview ==
- Published in Russia in 2009, journalist Valery Panyushkin's semi-autobiographical novel Twelve Who Don't Agree depicts twelve very different Russians from across the country's social, political and economic spectrum: chess champion and the chairman of the United Civil Front, Garry Kasparov. A columnist for the liberal Russian paper New Times, Viktor Shenderovich. The young center-left independent politician; Maria Gaidar. The passionate leader of the RPR-PARNAS party; Ilya Yashin. The unofficial leader of the radical communist group, the Vanguard of Red Youth; Sergei Udaltsov. The Bolshevik opposition-party leader; Maxim Gromov. The former adviser to President Vladimir Putin; Andrei Illarionov. The editor-in-chief of the popular dissident website Pravda Beslan; Marina Litvinovich. The former police officer and politician for 'Putin's Party,' United Russia; Anatoly Yermolin. The Moldovan investigative journalist for the Russian magazine New Times; Natalya Morar, and human rights activist Vissarion Aseev.

== See also ==
- Dissenters' March
- 2009 in literature
- Russian literature
