= Taisiya Osipova =

Russian activist (born 1984)

Taisiya Vital'evna Osipova (Russian: Таисия Витальевна Осипова, born 26 August 1984 in Smolensk) is a Russian opposition activist from the unregistered National Bolshevik Party and "The Other Russia" party. She is the wife of opposition activist Sergei Fomchenkov.

In 2011 Osipova was sentenced by the Russian courts to 10 years in prison for possession of heroin. In 2012 the sentence was reduced to 8 years in a retrial ordered by a higher court, after President Dmitry Medvedev had called her original sentence "too harsh". Osipova claims the heroin had been planted in a police raid. Mikhail Fedotov, head of Russia's council on human rights, has called the verdict a "legal mistake".

She was released in February 2017.
