= Pod tonkoy kozhey =

Studio album by Aleksandr Nepomnyashchiy
- Released: 1995, 2021
- Recorded: between 1992 and 1993
- Genre: Author song; rock
- Length: 42:32
- Label: Studiya Kolokol; Bull Terrier Records

Aleksandr Nepomnyashchiy chronology
Novyye pokhozhdeniya A. I. Svidrigaylova (1968–1994) (1994)	Pod tonkoy kozhey (1995)	Ekstremizm (1995)

Pod tonkoy kozhey (Russian: Под тонкой кожей, English: Under thin skin) is the compilation album featuring early songs written by Aleksandr Nepomnyashchiy between 1992 and 1993. The album was recorded in 1995.

The album represents an early stage in Aleksandr Nepomnyashchiy's work, characterized by existential motifs, themes of divine abandonment, and the total fragility of being. Its style is described as depressive, melancholic, bleak, and honest. At the same time, critics note that this lends the album a "unique charm" and a stylistic signature "unlike any other." A friend of his recalls that Aleksandr Nepomnyashchiy wrote these songs in the dormitory of Ivanovo State University under unbearable conditions while he was a student in the philology department in the early 1990s.

The album was first released in 1995 on cassette by Studiya Kolokol. It was reissued in 2021 by Bull Terrier Records on CD, featuring commentary from his friend from Ivanovo, Konstantin Sharonin, and a new design.

== Track listing ==
No.	Title	Length
1.	"Osvobozhdeniye ("Liberation")"
2.	"Osen' ("Autumn")"
3.	"Pobeg ("Escape")"
4.	"Ded Moroz"
5.	"Konveyyer ("Conveyor")"
6.	"Doroga domoy ("Way home")"
7.	"Eleazar"
8.	"Umirayet Vechnost' ("Eternity dies")"
9.	"Nofuturisticheskiy blyuz ("Nofuturistic blues")"
10.	"Vdogonku za dozhdom ("Chasing after the rain")"
11.	"Pesenka dlya Shvartsa ("Song for Schwartz")"
12.	"Macondo"

== Personnel ==
- Aleksandr Nepomnyashchiy – vocals, guitars
- Aleksey Vertogradov – sound engineer
- Nadezhda Stakhurskaya – first edition artist
- Alexander Shcherbak, Vadim Dzhalaev – design
- Konstantin Sharonin – friend of author and author of the comments to the 2021 edition
