= Primorsky Partisans =

Guerrilla group in Primorsky Krai, Russia

- Приморские партизаны
- Leaders: Andrei Sukhorada (dead by suicide); Aleksandr Kovtun (arrested)
- Dates active: February – 11 June 2010
- Headquarters: none static
- Active regions: Primorsky Krai, Russia
- Ideology: Far-right
- Size: 6 members 1 close supporter

The Primorsky Partisans were a group of six young men who waged a guerrilla war against the Russian police, who have long been accused of corruption and brutality.

== History ==
2010 Primorsky Krai Insurrection
- Date: February – 11 June 2010
- Location: Several towns and length of a motorway in south Primorsky Krai, Russian Federation.
- Caused by: Police brutality, Political extremism, Criminality (alleged by police), Police corruption
- Goals: Revenge
- Methods: Ambushes, Arson
- Result: Arrival of reinforcements, emergence widespread public support for the accused. Two acquitted. Police tactical victory, mixed strategic victory.

Parties
| Primorsky Partisans | Russian law enforcement |

Lead figures
| Andrei Sukhorada (dead by suicide); Aleksandr Kovtun (arrested) | Primorsky Krai Superintendent; Andrei Nikolaev |

Number
| 6 Militants; 1 Sympathizer in supporting role | Crackdown: +1,000 OMON Troops; APCs; Helicopters; K9s |

Casualties and losses
| 2 killed (suicide); 3 captured 2 surrendered (one wounded in custody) | : 1 MVD station set alight 2 Militsiya Oiffcers killed (Note: One stabbed to death in station raid, 1 fatally shot in roadside ambush); 1 MVD car stolen 3 wounded (Note: 1 wounded in roadside ambush, 2 in operation to apprehend the 4 suspects in the apartment); 3 Traffic officers wounded (Note: Roadside ambushes) |
- Two private automobiles stolen 5 civilians robbed, 1 wounded (the accused deny involvement)

From the small village of Kirovsky in Primorsky Krai, Russia's Far East they had long had encounters with the police they described as brutal, and degrading. The group decided on a violent solution to the appalling conditions with the police and waged a campaign against them including shooting traffic policemen, raiding a police station, and stabbing a police officer to death. The police began a large scale manhunt and the Partisans were tracked down to a flat belonging to one of the members 17 miles from the Chinese border, in Kirovsky. Before the shoot out began they posted a video on YouTube describing their motives.

As about a dozen militsiya officers and OMON troops approached, two of the four occupants opened fire with pistols, wounding two police officers. The police were later joined by a platoon of internal troops with BTR armored vehicles. After negotiations lasting five hours, two committed suicide, and the other two surrendered. This created a storm of controversy in Russia, as many Russians sympathized with the Partisans, and resented the police.

In a non-scientific poll by the popular radio station Echo of Moscow, 75% of responders said they viewed the Partisans as Robin Hoods, and 66% stated they would shelter the Partisans if given the chance. Nationalist politician Vladimir Zhirinovsky voiced his support for the Primorsky Partisans at a session of the State Duma.

On July 20, 2016 the jury trial came up with an acquittal verdict for all members following the second trial. Their guilt for committing the mass murder and creating an organized crime group was not proved. Vadim Kovtun and Alexei Nikitin were immediately set free. The rest of the Partisans remain behind bars, being accused of other crimes.

== Members ==
- Aleksandr Kovtun (Russian: Александр Ковтун), leader of the group. His brother Vadim Kovtun (Russian: Вадим Ковтун) was also arrested and charged with aiding and abetting, although not as part of the group.
- Andrei Sukhorada (Russian: Андрей Сухорада, July 25, 1987 – June 11, 2010) former member of National Bolshevik Party. On March 3, 2004, Sukhorada was arrested when police raided a group of National Bolsheviks who were staging an occupation of the United Russia Party HQ in Moscow. Eduard Limonov alleged that Sukhorada implied to him he'd carry out violent militant acts in his native region.
- Aleksandr Sladkikh (Russian: Александр Сладких, September 18, 1989 – June 11, 2010)
- Vladimir Ilyutikov (Russian: Владимир Илютиков)
- Roman Savchenko (Russian: Роман Савченко)
- Maksim Kirilov (Russian: Максим Кириллов)
- Alexei Nikitin (Russian: Алексей Никитин), arrested on July 31, 2010 as a supposed abettor.

== Motivation ==
On October 9, 2010, a 13-minute video entitled "Video Appeal of the Primorsky Partisans" was released on YouTube. In the video the partizans of the group declared a guerrilla war against corruption and Russian Militsiya. The video was removed from the YouTube server several times due to complaints.

== Reaction ==
A poll of listeners to the Echo of Moscow radio station indicated that 60–75 percent of listeners sympathised with the Primorsky Partisans and would offer them help.

== See also ==
- Petr Pavlensky
