= Murder of Yuriy Chervochkin =

2007 killing of a Russian opposition activist

Yuriy Chervochkin
- Юрий Червочкин
- Born: 31 December 1984; Serpukhov, Russian SFSR, Soviet Union
- Died: 11 December 2007 (aged 22); Serpukhov, Moscow Oblast, Russia
- Cause of death: Beating
- Occupation: Student
- Known for: Victim of a murder
- Political party: National Bolshevik Party
- Parent: Nadezhda Chervochkina (mother)

Yuriy Mikhailovich Chervochkin (Russian: Юрий Михайлович Червочкин; 31 December 1984 – 10 December 2007) was a Russian opposition activist. His murder resonated in the Russian opposition because he was attacked two days before Dissenters' March. Some observers remained convinced that perpetrators of the crime were members of Russian law enforcement.

== Oppositional activities ==
In January 2006, Chervochkin founded a branch of the National Bolshevik Party in Serpukhov. On 2 October, he was part of a group of 50 National Bolsheviks detained while attempting to enter the State Duma building in Moscow. On 11 March 2007, during the Moscow Oblast Duma elections, he and two other NBP members held a protest against unfair elections at a polling station in Odintsovo. They were detained and was detained for a month. On 11 June 2007 he was beaten by the militsiya and arrested for five days. Chevochkin was repeatedly detained during the Dissenters' Marches.

== Murder ==
On 22 November 2007, Chervochkin called a journalist hours before his attack and claimed he was being persecuted by the militsiya, who had repeatedly detained and interrogated him earlier. According to some sources, he reported the same to his fiancée (the leader of National Bolsheviks of Tula Anna Ploskonosova), accusing an officer of militsiya, Alexey Okopny, of being behind it. In the evening, he was beaten on the head with a baseball bat. Diagnosis explained an open brain injury and a fracture of the skull base. Chervochkin fell into a coma. On 11 December 2007, Yuri Chervochkin died in hospital.

=== Investigation ===
The perpetrators of the crime have not been found. Two investigations, carried out by the local prosecutor's office, stalled and ended due to lack of evidence.

=== Reactions ===
Garry Kasparov and Eduard Limonov attended his funeral.

On 19 December 2007, Belarusian activists picketed the Russian Embassy in memory of Yuriy Chervochkin. On 17 January 2008, the NBP and fellow opposition groups Oborona, the Russian People's Democratic Union, and the Vanguard of Red Youth protested in Moscow against the murder.

=== Opposition and Chervochkin's family version ===
Chervochkin's family, friends, and political associates remained convinced that Chervochkin was the victim of police brutality. Some observers believed that the attack may have been motivated by his political activism. They accuse the Regional Anti-Organized Crime Directorate of the Moscow Oblast and its chief, Alexey Okopny, of the murder. According to them, Okopny repeatedly detained and interrogated Chervochkin. In addition, shortly before the murder, Chervochkin reported that Okopny threatened to attack him.

On 18 October 2012, Okopny sued activists Sergei Aksenov and Pavel Shechtman, demanding they retract their accusations of his involvement in the murder. On 6 December 2012, the court fined Aksenov and Schechtman 40,000 and 50,000 rubles, but did not require them to publish a refutation of the accusations. A few days later, Shechtman published the article "The Story of a Murder", in which he again accuses Okopny of involvement in the murder, this time based on the materials of the trial.

== See also ==
- List of unsolved murders (2000–present)
