= National Bolshevik Front =

National Bolshevik Front Национал-большевистский фронт
- Abbreviation: NBF (English); НБФ (Russian)
- Leader: Alexei Golubovich; Maksim Shurkin
- Founded: 29 August 2006; 19 years ago
- Split from: National Bolshevik Party
- Newspaper: Doktrina
- Ideology: National Bolshevism
- Political position: Syncretic
- Religion: Russian Orthodox Old-Rite Church
- National affiliation: Eurasian Youth Union
- Colours: Red; Black
- Slogan: "Russia! Nation! Empire!" (Russian: "Россия! Нация! Империя!")

Party flag

Website
- nbf.org.ru

The National Bolshevik Front (NBF; Russian: Национал-большевистский фронт; НБФ, romanized: Natsional-bolshevistskiy front, NBF) was a Russian political party with a political program of National Bolshevism. The party was founded in 2006 by supporters of Aleksandr Dugin following a split within Eduard Limonov's National Bolshevik Party. The NBF is affiliated with Dugin's Eurasian Youth Union.

The "National Bolshevik Front" name had previously been used for multiple strands of National Bolshevism. The name was initially used by the Russian National Bolshevik Party when the party was founded by Eduard Limonov and Aleksandr Dugin in 1993. The group soon changed its name as it emerged as a political party. Although abandoned by the Russian party, the National Bolshevik Front name was still used by a loose federation of European National Bolshevik organisations. The name was also used by National Bolshevik parties in Venezuela and Bolivia.

== History and ideology ==
In August 2006, the "National Bolshevik Front" name was taken by Alexei Golubovich for a new anti-Limonovist splinter group from the NBP that he led. This new group has links with former NBP member Aleksandr Dugin and closely cooperates with the Eurasian Youth Union, a group of young supporters of Dugin's neo-Eurasianism.

The NBF's founders split from the NBP as they disagreed with what they perceived to be Limonov's policies of forging political alliances with pro-Western liberals and oligarchs in order to overthrow Vladimir Putin's government. The NBF considered this policy to be a betrayal of the original National Bolshevik fight against Western style democracy and capitalism. In the NBF's view, the NBP is no longer a National Bolshevik party, but rather the radical-looking wing of a wider revolutionary front supported by the enemies of Russian sovereignty.

The new NBF perceives exiled oligarchs like Boris Berezovsky and Vladimir Gusinsky and liberal-democratic pro-Western and pro-market political forces (such as the Union of Right Forces, Yabloko, Democratic Union and Garry Kasparov's supporters) as Russia's internal enemies, the external ones being perceived as NATO, American imperialism and the new world order. NBF ideology is deeply rooted in the Russian and German National Bolshevik traditions (Ernst Niekisch, Nikolay Ustryalov, the Smenavekhites and the Mladorossi movement) and they reject political and economic liberalism as well as claiming to reject ethnocentric and chauvinist nationalism.

== See also ==
- National Bolshevik Party
