= The Other Russia =

The Other Russia can refer to:

- The Other Russia (book), a 2003 book by Eduard Limonov
- The Other Russia (coalition), a 2006–2010 wide coalition of Russian political and human rights organizations, known as the organizer of the Dissenters' March
- The Other Russia of E. V. Limonov, a Russian political party created in 2010
