= Aleksandr Nepomnyashchiy =

Aleksandr Nepomnyashchiy Александр Непомнящий

Background information
- Born: February 16, 1968; Kovrov, Russian SFSR, Soviet Union
- Died: April 20, 2007 (aged 39) Ivanovo, Russia
- Genres: Bard
- Occupations: Vocalist, musician, poet, songwriter, producer,
- Instruments: Singing, guitar, bass guitar
- Years active: 1994–2007
- Labels: Kolokol Study; Vyrgorod
- Website: http://www.nepomn.ru/

Aleksandr Evgenyevich Nepomnyashchiy (Russian: Александр Евгеньевич Непомнящий; February 16, 1968 – April 20, 2007) was a Russian poet, singer and bard, as well as a member of the National Bolshevik Party. He was born in Kovrov and died, aged 39, in Ivanovo.

== Вeliefs ==
=== Political beliefs ===
He regarded the October Revolution as the price paid «for the attempt to build liberal capitalism in Russia» which, in his view, was incompatible with Russian civilization. He then argued that «now we cannot escape revolution» adding that its ideas would no longer be Marxist.

In the interview, he argued that Russia is threatened not by "totalitarianism," but rather by a typical Latin American-style authoritarianism. He attributed this to the absence of an idea or ideology capable of uniting the nation.

=== Religious beliefs ===
The early albums explore themes of divine abandonment. However, after embracing the Church, the songs take on a new fervor—the poetry now celebrates God’s love for humanity and the power of saving faith.

In his personal blog, Nepomnyashchy accused pagans of not seeing meaning in nature. Under the post, he responded that without Orthodox, Russians “will disappear”.

== Discography ==
=== Studio albums ===
- Novyye pokhozhdeniya A. I. Svidrigaylova (1968–1994) (New adventures of A. I. Svidrigailov (1968–1994))
- Ekstremizm (Extremism) (1995)
- Tomnaya storona lyubvi (The dark side of love) (1996)
- Polyus (Pole) (1997)
- Zemlyanika (Strawberry) (1999)
- Porazheniye (Defeat) (2000)
- Khleb Zemnoy () (2003)
- Ya potom rasskazhu tebe, Rodina… (I’ll tell you later, Motherland...) (2022)

=== Bootleg recording and compilation album ===
- Kak by Best of… (How would Best of…) (1993)
- Pod tonkoy kozhey (Under thin skin) (1995)
- Zerno (2000)
- Zelenyye kholmy (Green hills) (2001)

== Bibliography ==
- Rock poetry of Alexander Nepomnyashchy: research and materials / Ed.-comp. D. I. Ivanov. Ivanovo: Publisher O. V. Episheva, 2009. (Problems of modern literature: theory and practice. Issue 1). — 248 pp., illus. ISBN 978-5-904004-08-8
- Nepomnyashchiy Alexander. Poems / Compiled by O. Nepomnyashchaya, E. Kuvtyreva. - M.: Vyrgorod, 2013. - 236 pp., illus. ISBN 978-5-905623-02-8
