= Eurasian Youth Union =

Political organization in Russia

Eurasian Youth Union Евразийский союз молодёжи
- Abbreviation: ESM (English); ЕСМ (Russian)
- Leader: Aleksandr Dugin
- Chairperson: Pavel Kanishchev; Alexander Bovdunov
- Founded: 26 February 2005; 21 years ago
- Headquarters: 7th Building, Tverskaya Street, Moscow, Russia. 125375
- Newspaper: Eurasian Invasion
- Ideology: Neo-Eurasianism; National Bolshevism; Russian irredentism; Traditionalist conservatism; Anti-Western sentiment
- Political position: Syncretic
- Religion: Russian Orthodox Church: Russian Orthodox Old-Rite Church
- National affiliation: Eurasia Party
- International affiliation: International Eurasian Movement
- Colors: Black; Gold
- Slogan: "Glory to the Empire! Russian, get up!" (Russian: «Слава Империи! Русский, вставай!»)

Party flag

Website
- rossia3.ru

The Eurasian Youth Union (ESM; Russian: Евразийский союз молодёжи; ЕСМ; Yevraziyskiy soyuz molodozhi, YeSM) is a Russian Eurasianist political organization, the youth wing of the Eurasia Party headed by Aleksandr Dugin. The organization has branches in several countries. In 2011, the Government of Ukraine has branded the ESM as an extremist anti-Ukrainian organization, convicted of a string of vandalism offenses and banned it in Ukraine.

== Ideology ==
According to some observers, the ESM was created as a reaction to the Orange Revolution in Ukraine and the role the younger generation played in it. It is suggested that ESM represents an opposition to a Ukrainian youth organization PORA.

The early-20th century Eurasianist ideology of a part of the Russian emigration and modern neo-Eurasianism developed by Aleksandr Dugin has been declared the main ideology of the organization. On its website, the movement declared the West and in particular the United States as its main opponent and termed it as the "main evil":

Our Union has one absolute enemy. It is the USA. This is the beginning and the end of our hatred.

In its internal policy, the ESM supports the current government of Russia and in particular its President Vladimir Putin. Some also claim that the movement receives tacit support from the Russian government eager to see a movement opposed to a possibility of an Orange Revolution happening in Russia.

== Activities ==
In Russia, the ESM has allied itself with organizations like the National Bolshevik Front, and other groups of that type. It organizes and takes part in the annual Russian marches in Russia and other countries of Eastern Europe. Very often these marches are accompanied by violence, especially in Ukraine.

After Ukraine's Orange Revolution in 2004, the ESM set up branches in several Ukrainian cities and voiced its sharp criticism of the pro-Western Ukrainian government. The ECM was responsible for a string of attacks on property and organizations they deemed pro-Western. It organised attacks on several Ukrainian Security Service branches, monuments to Ukrainian Insurgent Army veterans and hacker attacks on the website of the President of Ukraine. The most prominent of these attacks that received nationwide attention was the desecration of Ukrainian state symbols on Mount Hoverla in October 2007. The other attack on Ukrainian targets was in Moscow, where several ESM members trashed an exhibition devoted to the Holodomor (1932–1933). Due to the relatively high profile of these attacks the Ukrainian police asked for assistance from Russia in finding people responsible for them, but no suspects have been apprehended yet.

The organization's vandalism and sharp anti-governmental stance received wide condemnation among Ukrainian media and provoked a response from different Ukrainian organizations of the opposite orientation. Several threats were made against the organization and its members and an arson attack was reciprocated on the ESM's offices in Moscow.

== Bans ==
In 2011, a Ukrainian court banned the ESM and its leaders Dugin and Zarifullin were declared personae non grata. In June 2015, Canada added the organization to its list of sanctioned entities.

== Criticism ==
The "Sova Center" in its classification classifies the ESM as the "ideological neighbors" of radical Russian nationalists. At the same time, Eurasians claim that the Sova Center cannot objectively evaluate the patriotic organizations of Russia, since it is funded from the United States.

Some Russian and Ukrainian media outlets, the Association of Jewish Organizations and Communities of Ukraine, Kharkiv Human Rights Group, Galina Kozhevnikova and Tatyana Stanovskaya consider the ESM a radical organization.
