= LGBTQ topics in Russia =

LGBTQ topics in Russia include:

- LGBTQ rights in Russia
- LGBTQ history in Russia
- LGBTQ culture in Russia
- Same-sex marriage in Russia
- LGBTQ people in the Russo-Ukrainian War

== See also ==
- LGBT by country
