= Aleksey Nepomniaschiy =

Ukrainian journalist

Aleksey Sergeevich Nepomniaschiy (Russian: Алексей Серге́евич Непомнящий, Ukrainian: Олексій Сергійович Непомнящий) is a Russian and Ukrainian journalist, main editor of daily business newspaper Capital.

== See also ==
- Capital (Ukrainian newspaper)
