= Interbrigades =

Participant in the armed conflict in eastern Ukraine

- Интербригады
- Active: 6 May 2014 – present
- Allegiance: Russia; Donetsk People's Republic; Luhansk People's Republic
- Type: Infantry
- Part of: The Other Russia
- Mottos: Yes, death!
- Engagements: War in Donbas; Siege of Sloviansk; Battle of Kramatorsk; Syrian civil war; Battle of Khasham
- Website: t.me/interbrigady2022

The Interbrigades (Russian: Интербригады, romanization: Interbrigady) is a volunteer movement organized by the unregistered Russian National Bolshevik political party "The Other Russia" to participate in the war in eastern Ukraine on the side of the Donetsk People's Republic and the Luhansk People's Republic.

The Interbrigade movement, according to its members, was formed in May 2014. According to Zakhar Prilepin, a former member of the Other Russia, by January 2015 the movement had transported over 2,000 fighters to Donbas. According to the published sources of the rebel group, they took part in the battles for Sloviansk and Kramatorsk, and also were engaged in the protection of the leader of the "Other Russia" Eduard Limonov during his visit to the Luhansk region. Also, according to the activists of the "Interbrigades" and the "Other Russia", the movement is engaged in the delivery of humanitarian aid. In the conflict around the murder of Alexander Bednov, the Interbrigades sided with the leadership of the LPR, Igor Plotnitsky.

One prominent member was Latvian National Bolshevik Beness Aijo, nicknamed "Black Lenin".
