= Valery Panyushkin =

Russian journalist and writer (born 1969)

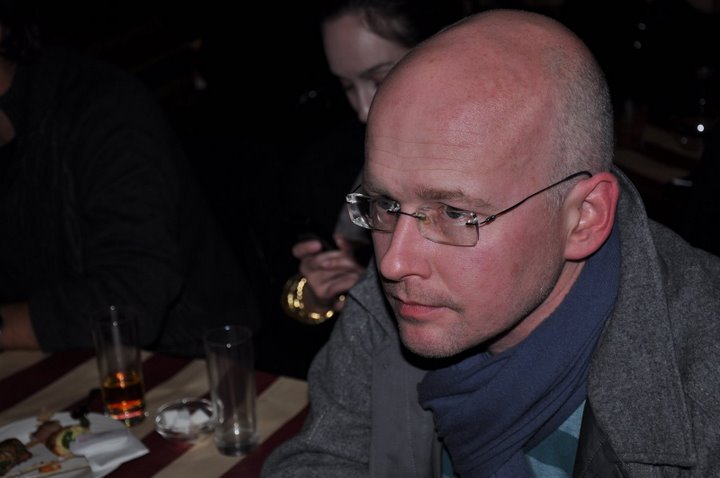
- Born: 26 June 1969 (age 57); Saint Petersburg, Russian SFSR, Soviet Union
- Education: Lunacharsky State Institute for Theatre Arts
- Occupations: Journalist and writer
- Writing career
- Language: Russian
- Notable work: 12 Who Don't Agree
- Valery Panyushkin's voice Panyushkin on the Echo of Moscow program, 26 September 2008

Valery Panyushkin (Russian: Валерий Панюшкин; born 26 June 1969) is a Russian journalist and writer.

== Works ==
- Узник тишины: История про то, как человеку в России стать свободным и что ему за это будет, 2006
- Незаметная вещь, 2006
- Газпром. Новое русское оружие, 2008
- 12 несогласных - 12 Who Don't Agree, 2009
- Михаил Ходорковский. Узник тишины 2, 2009
- Код Горыныча: Что можно узнать о русском народе из сказок, 2009
- Восстание потребителей, 2012
- Код Кощея: Русские сказки глазами юриста, 2012
- Рублевка: Player’s handbook, 2013
- Все мои уже там. - Эксмо, 2013
- Русские налоговые сказки, 2014
