= Strategy-31 =

Civic movement in support of the right to peaceful assembly in Russia

Coordinates: 55°46′10″N 37°35′45″E

- Strategy-31 logo
- Native name: Стратегия-31
- Date: July 31, 2009
- Time: 18:00, on the 31st of every month with 31 days
- Location: Moscow, Triumfalnaya Square, Saint Petersburg near Great Gostiny Dvor and other Russian cities
- Organised by: Eduard Limonov, Moscow Helsinki Group, Memorial society, Solidarnost, Oborona, Gayrussia.ru, Movement Against Illegal Immigration, Movement For Human Rights, and other organizations
- Participants: representatives of Russian opposition, human rights activists

Strategy-31 (Russian: Страте́гия-31) is a series of civic protests in support of the right to peaceful assembly in Russia guaranteed by Article 31 of the Russian constitution. Since July 31, 2009, the protests were held in Moscow on Triumfalnaya Square on the 31st of every month with 31 days.

The name is an example of a trend in organizations' naming themselves after sections of treaties and law, something that Zachary Elkins has called "chapter-verse branding."

== History ==
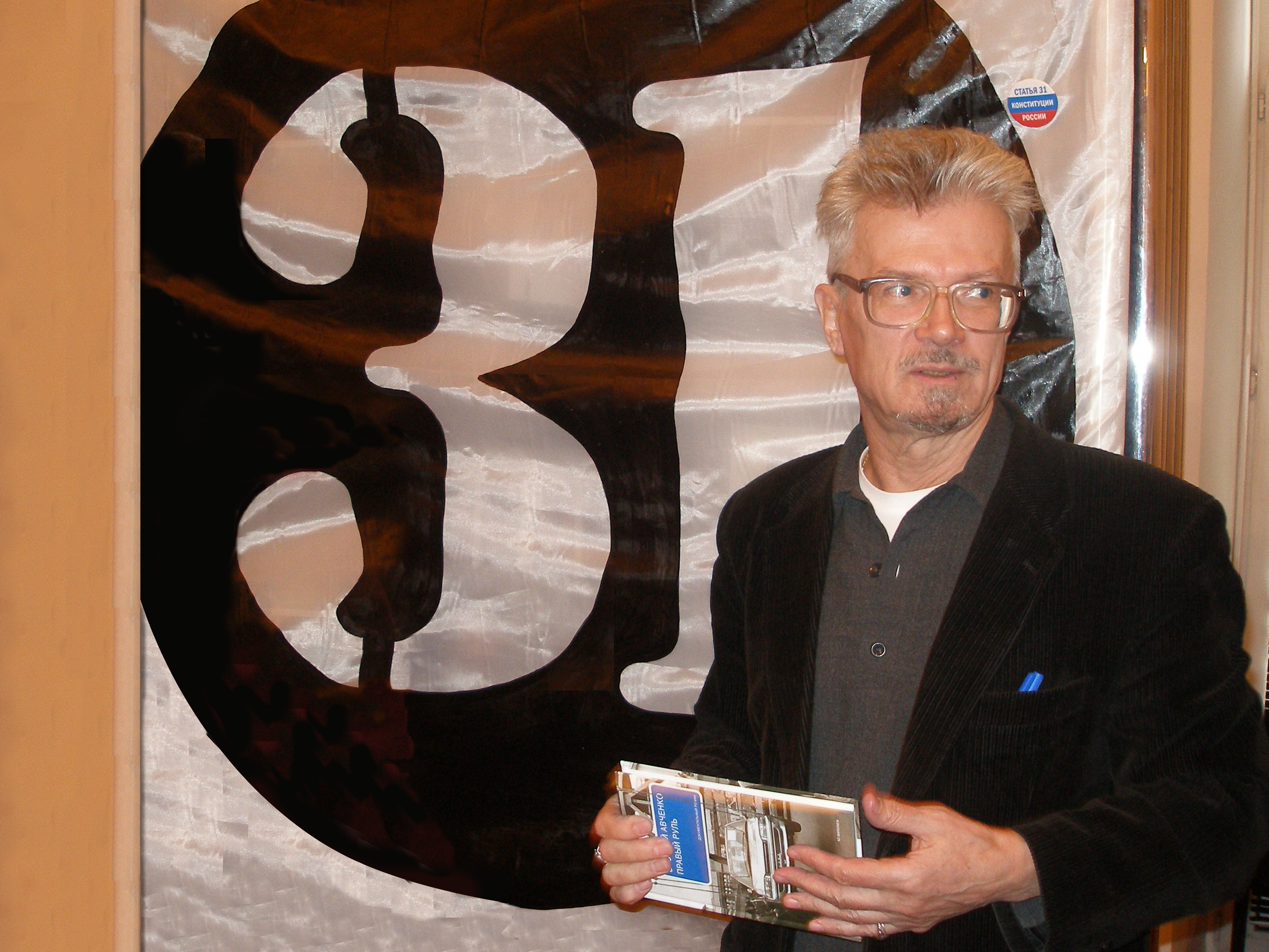
One of the organizers of Strategy-31 Eduard Limonov in March 2010

Described as an "elite organization" by American Foreign Policy magazine, Strategy-31 was initiated by Eduard Limonov, founder of the National Bolshevik Party and one of the leaders of The Other Russia coalition. It was subsequently supported by many prominent Russian human rights organisations including the Moscow Helsinki Group, the Memorial human rights centre and other public and political movements and associations. It started with modest support but with each event increased in the numbers.

Every one of the Strategy-31 actions since it commenced has been refused permission by the authorities on the grounds that other activities were planned to take place on Triumfalnaya Square at the same time on the respective dates. These "counter-actions" included the "Choose Health, Be Like Us!" festival (July 31, 2009), a youth sports festival (August 31, 2009), the "Division" military-sports festivity (October 31, 2009), an action of the pro-Kremlin "Young Russia" movement (December 31, 2009), and the "Winter Amusements" festivity (January 31, 2010). Each of the Strategy-31 actions was dispersed by regular and riot police and accompanied by large-scale detentions of participants and passers-by.

The action attracted a strong public and international response on December 31, 2009, when among dozens of other participants the police grabbed and detained the Chairperson of the Moscow Helsinki Group Lyudmila Alexeyeva (84). The President of the European Parliament Jerzy Buzek and the US National Security Council expressed their outrage at the detention of the prominent human rights activist, while The New York Times devoted its front page to an article about this protest action.

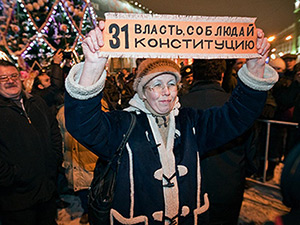
Moscow, Triumfalnaya Square. December 31, 2009

The Strategy-31 action on May 31, 2010 has gathered a record number of participants (more than 2000 according to some sources and was dispersed with over 100 arrests.

Since January 2010, the Strategy-31 actions have spread from Moscow, to other Russian cities including Saint Petersburg, Arkhangelsk, Vladivostok, Yekaterinburg, Kemerovo and Irkutsk (about twenty Russian cities in total).

On August 31, 2010, protests took place globally, in London, New York, Toronto and Tel Aviv. The original initiative for "Strategy-31 Abroad" came from the blog of Alex Goldfarb, a close associate of exiled Russian oligarch Boris Berezovsky – though this was originally denied by Andrei Sidelnikov, the organizer of the London protests.

== See also ==
- Freedom of assembly in Russia
- Dissenters' March
- 2011–13 Russian protests
