= Triumfalnaya Square =

Square in Moscow, Russia

- Public square
- {{{other_names}}}
- Триумфальная площадь
- Nicknames: Mayakovka, Mayak (1960s)
- Former name: Mayakovsky Square (1935—1992)
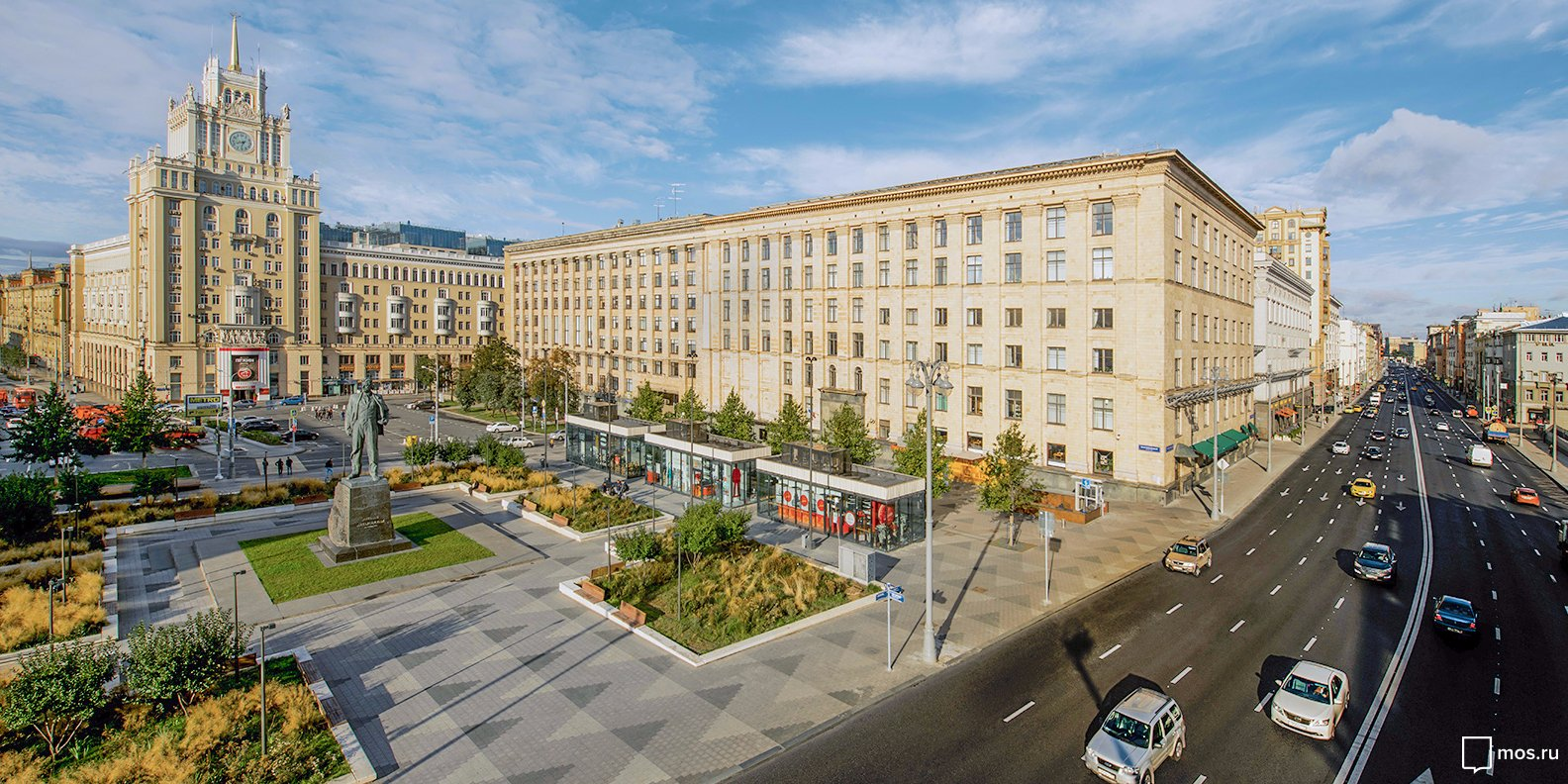
- Triumfalnaya square, view to the 1st Tverskaya-Yamskaya Street, Pekin hotel and Mayakovsky statue
- Features: Statue of Vladimir Mayakovsky, Pekin hotel, Mayakovskaya metro station
- Location: Moscow, Central Administrative Okrug, Tverskoy District
- Interactive map of Triumfalnaya Square
- Coordinates: 55°46′12″N 37°35′44.88″E

Triumfalnaya Square (Russian: Триумфальная площадь, romanized: Triumfalnaya ploshchad; formerly Mayakovsky Square, colloquially Mayakovka) is a public square in the Tverskoy District of the Central Administrative Okrug of Moscow. It is located in the Garden Ring between the Big Garden street, 1st Brest street and 2nd Brest street, 1st Tverskaya Yamskaya street, Armory alley, Building Arc and Tverskaya Street.
