= Prisoners' Union (Russia) =

Russian human rights organization

Prisoners' Union (Russian: Союз заключённых, romanized: Soyuz zaklyuchyonnykh) is a Russian human rights monitoring non-governmental organization. The organization was founded in 2008. The Prisoners' Union foundation meeting was held in Moscow and was attended by 40 former political prisoners. Prisoners' Union works to expose human rights violations within the penal system in Russia. Prisoners' Union publishes monitoring materials regarding the situation in Russian prisons and holds press conferences. The organization calls for an amnesty for all political prisoners in Russia.

== See also ==
- Prisons in Russia
- Human rights in Russia
- Prison abolition movement
- Prisoners' rights
