= Boris Stomakhin =

Russian radical political activist

Boris Vladimirovich Stomakhin (Russian: Борис Владимирович Стомахин) (born August 24, 1974 in Moscow) is a Russian radical political activist, and editor of "Radical politics" periodical. He was convicted three times for hate speech, incriminating him advocating a dismemberment of the Russian Federation and inciting ethnic and religious hatred, and justification of terrorism. The convictions have been questioned by human rights organizations ARTICLE 19, Committee to Protect Journalists, and Union of Councils for Soviet Jews.

== Journalism and political activism ==
Stomakhin was a member of Maoist Revolutionary Workers Party. Later he became a leader of a radical political group "Revolutionary Contact Association" (RCA).

Since 2000, Boris Stomakhin was an editor of the monthly newspaper "Radical Politics". In addition, he contributed numerous materials to Kavkaz Center, the radical Islamic internet agency that promoted the independence of Chechnya and is maintained by Chechen separatists.

According to Russian court, Stomakhin called for the violent overthrow of government, claimed that Russian troops in Chechnya are "occupiers", compared President Vladimir Putin to Saddam Hussein and Slobodan Milošević., called modern Russia "an Evil empire" that must be destroyed, and considered Shamil Basaev and Salman Raduev as heroes of legitimate Chechen resistance.

According to Valeria Novodvorskaya and Yakov Krotov, Stomakhin did not actually promote any terrorist activities and became a political prisoner.

== Opening of a criminal case against Stomakhin ==
Attempts to prosecute Stomakhin for hate speech were made unsuccessfully in 2000.

Successful application to prosecute Stomakhin was made by opposition Communist Party State Duma member Viktor Zorkaltsev at the request of another Communist party member Valentina Lavrova. Valentina Lavrova has acquired a copy of Stomakhin Radical Politics periodical, while being on rally in Mayakovsky Square, Moscow, in September 2002. Being insulted by the text of periodicals she hasn't rushed immediately to authorities, and began to collect the evidence by visiting public actions of Stomakhin and acquiring new numbers of his periodical. After collecting the evidence she referred not to police or security authorities, but to the member of parliament, Viktor Zorkaltsev.

Stomakhin's home was searched in April 2004 and his computers and books were confiscated. Stomakhin fled to Ukraine seeking political asylum, which was eventually denied.

== Arrest and trial ==
Having returned to Moscow, Stomakhin was arrested on March 21, 2006. Stomakhin tried to escape during his arrest and fell down from fourth floor of his building, according to his lawyer Alexei Golubev and news reports. His spine and bones were broken as a result.

Stomakhin was subsequently interrogated. Psychiatry experts at the Moscow Serbsky Institute found that Stomakhin was competent to stand trial.

He was sentenced to five years of prison for inciting hatred and defamatory statements aimed at groups and persons of particular religious and ethnic background and for promoting violent change of constitutional regime and violation of territorial integrity of Russian Federation (articles 280 and 282 of the Russian Criminal Code).

In five years after his arrest on 21 March 2011 Somakhin was released from jail.

== Second arrest, new criminal case and conviction ==
Boris Stomakhin was arrested again at his apartment Nov. 20 2012 and on a charge of violating the "anti-extremist" articles of the Criminal Code (articles 282 and 205 of the Criminal Code). Detention was the anniversary of his conviction in 2006. Court authorized his detention until 9 February 2013. The investigation was opened on July 10, 2012 and, although this was not mentioned anywhere, and Stomakhin summonses for questioning did not get up to the time of his detention.

The subject of the charges brought against the 21 November 2012 and served as the signature of three articles Stomakhin published on the Internet, namely, "Do not let another Holocaust" and "Untermensch" (in Part 1 of Article 282 of the Criminal Code, "excitement hatred and hostility on grounds of nationality or origin"), and "Mourning" (in Part 1 of the Criminal Code st.205.2, "public justification of terrorism"). In case are other article signed Stomakhin published since 2001 and (also before his first arrest). The investigation Stomakhin refused to give evidence in accordance with Article 51 of the Constitution.

The arrest of journalist was condemned by a number of public figures, including historian and sociologist Alec D. Epstein, journalists Daniel Kotsjubinsky and Vladimir Pribylovsky, a former member of the Federation Council Alexei Manannikov, the former Soviet dissidents and political prisoners Adele Naydenovich, Natalya Gorbanevskaya, Andrey Derevyankin, Paul Lyuzakov, Elena Sannikova, Alexander Podrabinek, and Cyril Podrabinek, Valeria Novodvorskaya., Pyotr Verzilov. A campaign for his release. So, on the actions of the Russian opposition to 2012-2013 s raised banners with the text "Free Boris Stomakhin", his portraits with the inscription "Boris Stomakhin. 5 years in prison" were pasted on the walls Russian embassy in Berlin the night of January 16, 2013 and during the campaign in support of arrested activists of the Russian opposition, more than 100 opposition signed a petition demanding the release Stomakhin.

22 April 2014 Stomakhin was sentenced to 6.5 years in prison. 15 July 2014 sentence has been approved by Moscow city court.

== Third trial ==
After the third trial, on April 20, 2015 the sentence was extended to 7 years.

== European Court of Human Rights decision ==
In May 2018 the European Court of Human Rights found that the Stomakhin’s punishment was not proportionate to the legitimate aims pursued and awarded him EUR 12,500 in respect of non-pecuniary damage.

== Release and emigration ==
In September 2019 Stomakhin was released from imprisonment. In November 2019 he left Russia and asked for asylum in Ukraine.

== Commentaries ==
=== Support ===
Alexander Litvinenko said that "people like Boris are the most dangerous for the Putin's regime that deceived millions of Russians, brought them to their knees and transformed them to slaves". According to priest Yakov Krotov, "Stomakin made a picture of Putin with swastika? Well, I believe that not only Putin and his generals deserve to wear swastika, but also all Russian civilians who pretend that they know nothing about the genocide of Chechens and discrimination of Georgians in Russia"

Stomakhin was qualified as a prisoner of conscience" by the Union of Councils for Soviet Jews and as a political prisoner in an open letter send to G7 leaders by Russia's human rights activists Sergei Kovalev, Yelena Bonner.

A group of Russian citizens including Vladimir Bukovsky condemned the conviction of Stomakhin as prosecution of free speech.

Widow of Andrei Sakharov Elena Bonner compared Stomakhin with Soviet dissidents who were prosecuted for their writings by Yuri Andropov.

Human rights activist Svetlana Gannushkina and politician Valeria Novodvorskaya argued that Stomakhin's writings while being "absolutely outrageous" and "inciting national hatred" had not been a public threat: they were very unlikely to incite anybody

Journalist Vladimir Abarinov criticized court proceedings as an example of kangaroo court He claimed that the criminal case against Stomakhin was opened based on solely an article about Russian Orthodox Church that was not written by Stomakhin. It was decided by the court that Stomakhin actually copied this article from a Live Journal entry, as well as other publications of numerous news agencies. The authors of the original work disagree to share their responsibility with Stomakhin citing that he had reproduced their works without permission and distorted the original meaning.

=== Criticism ===
M. Smolin from Komsomolskaya Pravda described views of Stomakhin as extremely Russophobic.

Critics of the court decision were denounced by publicist Maxim Sokolov. In his article published in Izvestia newspaper after the conviction of Stomakhin he remarked that Stomakhin's writings were worse than Mein Kampf by Adolf Hitler ("Against this backdrop, Mein Kampf is a textbook of humanism.") and that the hate speech must be prosecuted according to the article 282 of the Russian criminal code. He cited in support a text written by Boris Stomakhin, that "Russian Federation and Russians must be exterminated" by all available means including nuclear bomb, because all Russians are collectively responsible for actions of their government with respect to Chechen people. According to Sokolov, the cited passage made application of the article 282 completely appropriate.

Aleksandr Cherkasov of the human rights center Memorial stated that they did not consider Stomakhin political prisoner, because his writings did call for discrimination and violence. At the same time he described the punishment as excessive, because Stomakhin did not organize any criminal acts.
