= Nataliya Medvedeva (singer) =

Russian writer and singer

Nataliya Georgiyevna Medvedeva (Russian: Наталия Георгиевна Медведева; 14 July 1958 – 3 February 2003) was a Russian poet, writer, singer, and frontwoman of the hard rock bands Tribunal Natalii Medvedevoy and NATO.

== Career ==
At the age of 17, Medvedeva, a native of Leningrad, moved to Los Angeles where she found work as a model, posing for Playboy and for the cover of The Cars' self-titled debut album in 1978, photographed by Elliot Gilbert.

She was married to Eduard Limonov, a controversial Russian writer and later leader of the National Bolshevik Party, whom she met in 1982 in Los Angeles. Her Los Angeles period is depicted in her novel Hotel California (1989). In 1982, Medvedeva moved to Paris and became a piano bar singer. She wrote poetry, essays for French magazines, and published two novels in 1985 and 1987. In 1989, she participated in a collective poetry project, The Last 16 December 1989, together with poets Oleg Prokofiev and Anton Koslov Mayr. This project was published as a book the same year by William Brui.

In the early 1990s, Medvedeva introduced herself as a Novy Vzglyad representative in France.

In October 1993, Medvedeva initiated an appeal to end the siege of the White House (Russian parliament) organized by Boris Yeltsin. An open letter signed by a number of Russian artists and writers was published by the French press. In late 1993 Medvedeva, following Limonov, moved to Moscow. They separated in 1995. In the late 1990s, Medvedeva had a relationship with Serguei Vysokosov, the lead guitarist from Corrosia Metalla. She recorded two albums in Russia – Trubinal Natalii Medvedevoi (Natalya Medvedeva's Tribunal) and A U Nikh Byla Strast' ("They had a passion").

She died in her sleep of a heart attack on 3 February 2003, at the age of 44. At the time of her death, Medvedeva was living in Moscow. Her ex-husband Eduard Limonov maintained that she committed suicide by an overdose of heroin. Her ashes were spread over four main cities of her life: Saint Petersburg, Moscow, Paris and Los Angeles.

== Published works ==
- Mama, ia zhulika liubliu!: roman. New York: Russica Publishers, 1988, c. 1987. ISBN 0-89830-114-9
- "Poslednee 16-e Dekabrya 1989 goda", Atelier William Brui, Paris, 1989
- Otelʹ "Kalifornia": roman, rasskazy Moskva: Literaturno-khudozh. zhurnal "Glagol", 1992. ISBN 5-87532-008-7
- Moya borʹba Belgorod: "Vspyshki", 1994. ISBN 5-900303-96-9
- Ia reyu znamenem--: stikhi Sankt-Peterburg: "Iskusstvo-SPB", 1995. ISBN 5-210-01478-9
- Liubovʹ s alkogolem; V strane chudes (Russkaya tetradʹ) Belgorod: "Vspyshki", 1995. ISBN 5-900303-94-2
- A u nikh byla strastʹ-- Moskva: Vagrius, 1999. ISBN 5-264-00059-X
- Zhiznʹ v "No future" Moskva: Zapasnyĭ vykhod/Emergency Exit, 2005. ISBN 5-98726-016-7

== See also ==
- Novy Vzglyad
- Yevgeny Dodolev
- Valeriya Novodvorskaya
- Alexander Prokhanov
