= Mikhail Leontyev =

Russian journalist and political commentator (born 1958)

- Михаил Леонтьев
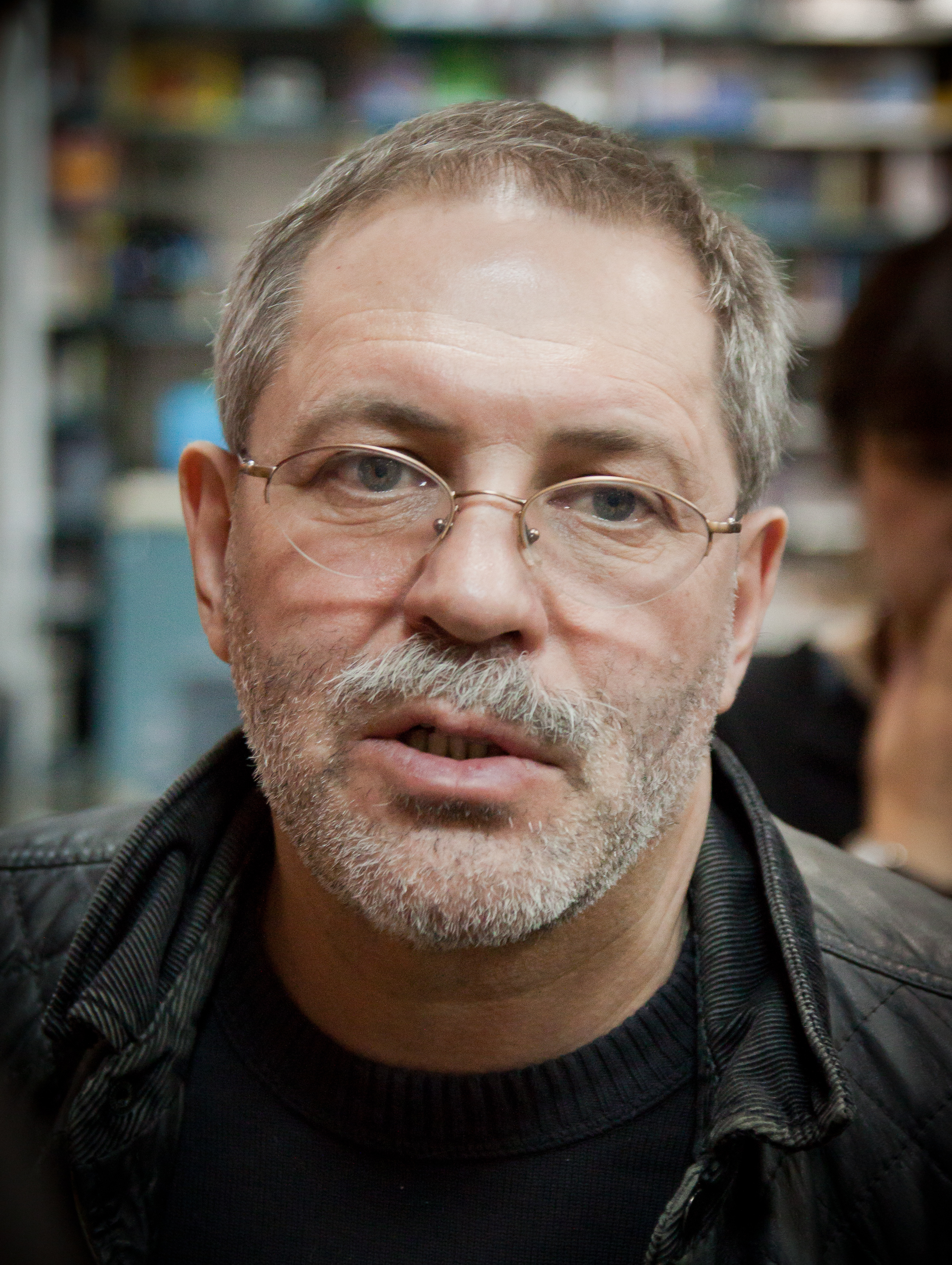
- Leontyev in 2013
- Born: 12 October 1958 (age 68); Moscow, Russia
- Education: Moscow Institute of National Economy
- Occupation: Political commentator

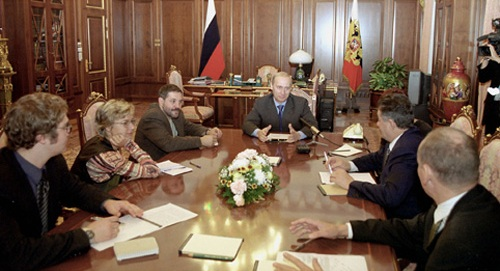
Leontyev next to Russian President Vladimir Putin (right hand) in 2000

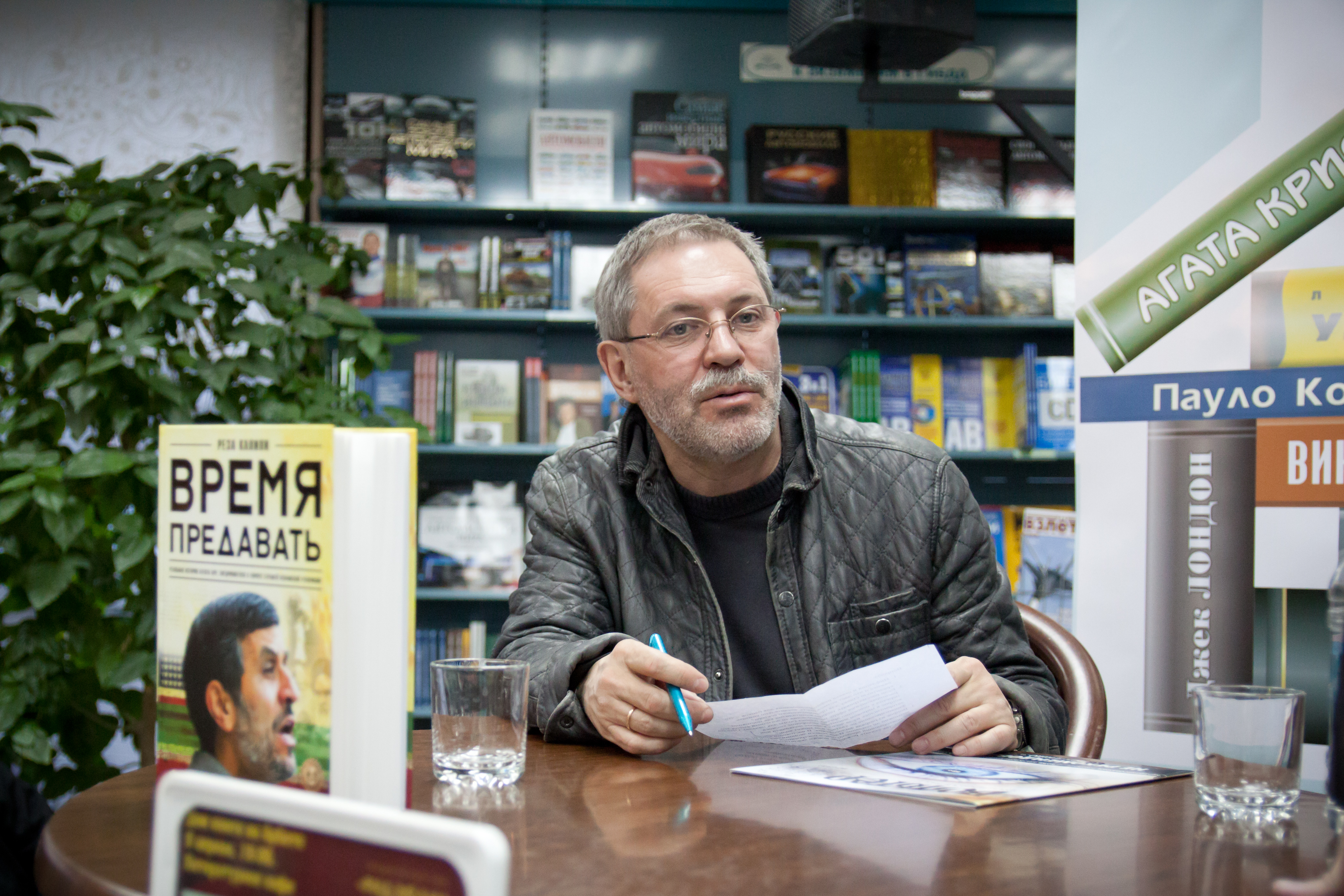
Mikhail Leontyev in 2013

Mikhail Vladimirovich Leontyev (Russian: Михаи́л Влади́мирович Лео́нтьев; born 12 October 1958) is a Russian political commentator currently working on national TV Channel One. He is known for his program "Odnako" (Russian: "Однако") (Translated "However" or "Still"), irregularly appearing on air with commentaries on certain political occasions since March 1999. He is also a laureate of the "Golden pen of Russia" award and the TEFI award.

== Biography ==
Leontyev graduated from the Department of General Economics of the Moscow Institute of National Economy in 1979, and worked in a scientific-research institute up to 1985. Then he graduated from a vocational college with the profession of "joiner-cabinetmaker", worked as unskilled labourer in the Museum of Literature, was a guard at the cottage of Boris Pasternak, and offered private lessons in history.

From 1989 he began working in journalism and served as a correspondent of the political department of the newspaper Kommersant. In 1990 headed the economic department of Nezavisimaya Gazeta. He became assistant editor-in-chief in of the newspaper Business МН.

In 1993 he participated in the founding of the newspaper Segodnya and for some time worked as assistant editor-in-chief there. He has worked in television since 1997, at first on channel TVC; in February 1999 he left TVC for Channel One.

Besides Odnako, on Channel One Leontyev also made programs "Different Time" and "Puppet Theater with Leontyev", but they were closed by the channel. Leontyev also put together a project named "Bolshaya Igra" (The Great Game) with him in close-ups. It hit the air in October 2007, on the same channel . The short series of shows dealt with key historical episodes, chiefly mirroring relations between the West and Russia, and taking the storyline to the present day to thus show the origins of the current issues concerning Russia and the western countries.

Leontyev was awarded "Gold Pen of Russia" and nominated for TEFI-1997 (national television award).

Since 2009 Leontyev has been publisher and co-owner (along with Channel One) of the weekly magazine Odnako.

The magazine writers include:

- Evgeny Dodolev
- Aleksandr Dugin
- Marina Lesko
- Thierry Meyssan
- Alexander Nevzorov

== Controversy ==
Latvia declared Leontyev persona non grata after his sharp words about the country in 2003 interview on Riga television. In 2006, the Ukrainian government banned Leontyev from visiting the country for five years, referring to his "insulting statements" towards Ukraine (denying the existence of Ukrainian national identity).

In 2007 Leontyev has launched Ukrainian business magazine Der Spiegel-Profil (as Editor in Chief). Publisher Evgeny Dodolev ended its one-year print run for magazine, due to economic difficulties (in 2008).

Leontyev made several scandalous accusations both in his own show and in various interviews, for some of which he underwent trials. In 2001 he accused Viktor Yuschenko's wife, Kateryna Yushchenko-Chumachenko, of influencing her husband's political decisions with American ideas, hinting that she is an agent of American government in Ukraine. Mrs. Yushchenko has won two libel cases regarding the accusations in 2002 in Ukrainian city of Kyiv, but the Russian government refuses to take legal actions against Leontyev as ruled out by the Ukrainian court.

In November 2014, Leontyev wrote an article for Channel One Russia, which presented an aerial photo claiming to show a jet fighter firing a missile at Malaysian Airlines Flight 17. This refuted the view, widely held in the West, that MH17 had been shot down by a BUK missile fired by Russian-backed separatists in eastern Ukraine. The photo in Leontyev's article was analysed by contributors to the Bellingcat site, who found it had been artificially constructed with photo manipulation software, and was not a genuine image of the incident.

On 14 January 2016, Leontyev became the spokesperson for Rosneft.

In September 2016, Leontyev vouched for the experience of Carter Page, former foreign policy advisor to Donald Trump, both in the oil industry and as an "authoritative" expert on Russia.

In July 2020, he called for assimilation or genocide against Circassians, these comments were sparked over the demolition of a War Monument commemorating the Circassian Genocide in Adler, he said in addressing the Circassian population living in Russia: "Yes, gentlemen, you have two options. First, we either tolerate you and assimilate you; or we destroy you." and "A line was drawn for you and you were told not to go beyond this line. You will stay here! Be happy that you are tolerated, that you continue to exist!"

He was sanctioned by the United Kingdom from 4 May 2022 in relation to support of Russia's actions in Ukraine.
