= Rodionov Publishing House =

Moscow-based publishing house

- Company type: Private company
- Industry: Publishing
- Founded: 1996
- Founder: Sergey S. Rodionov and his father Sergey P. Rodionov
- Defunct: 2017
- Headquarters: Moscow, Russia
- Area served: Russia
- Products: Magazines
- Owner: Iskander Makhmudov and Andrey Bokarev
- Number of employees: 360 (2008)
- Website: www.idr.ru

Rodionov Publishing House (Russian: Издательский дом Родионова) (IDR, Izdatelsky Dom Rodionova) was a publishing house based in Moscow that owned several magazine titles whose publications occupied a leading position in the group of monthly business and financial publications in Russia between 1999 and 2009. It was founded by Sergey S. Rodionov and his father.

In 2004, Sergei Rodionov sold 50% of the company to Iskander Makhmudov and Andrey Bokarev. Rodionov Publishing House's managers included Evgeny Dodolev (he ran Rodionov Publishing House in 2005–2009 as CEO). Rodionov Publishing House published the Politburo (closed January 2004), Paradox (closed July 2004) and other magazines. Its portfolio includes business, men's, women's and special interest magazines.

After the Great Recession, the company began to close existing publications. In December 2017, the last asset was sold - the Profil magazine, which was owned by the European Media Group

== History ==
=== General overview: timeline ===
==== 1996–2003 ====
- 1996 Rodionov Publishing House Ltd. established.
- 1996 Profil (The Profile) business magazine published. Ranked among top three national business magazines.
- 1998 Kariera (The Career) business magazine published. Ranked the first and most popular magazine

in the career development arena.

- 2003 Moulin Rouge / Max men's magazine published under license.

==== 2004–2006 ====
- 2004 Sergei Rodionov sold 50% of the company to Iskander Makhmudov and Andrey Bokarev
- 2004 Profil magazine published in Ukraine under the license of Rodionov Publishing House.
- 2005 Domovoy home magazine acquired first glossy magazine in Russia.
- 2005 Glossy Publishing Ltd-advertising agency established.
- 2005 Kompaniya (The Company) business magazine acquired.
- 2005 BusinessWeek (Russian Edition) launched, under license.
- 2005 Krest'yanka Publishing House acquired, with one of the oldest magazines (since 1922) in Russia.
- 2005 Profil (The Profile) magazine published, co-branded with Der Spiegel.
- 2006 Ona (She) women's magazine
- 2006 XXL men's magazine acquired.
- 2006 Moy Malen'kiy parenting magazine established.
- 2006 M2 (square meter) regional real estate newspaper acquired.
- 2006 TV7 acquired.

==== 2007–2009 ====
- 2007 FHM (Russian edition) men's magazine acquired.
- 2007 Moy Malen'kiy magazine launched.
- 2007 M2 (square meter) sold to a strategic investor.
- 2007 – Der Spiegel-Profil launched in Ukraine.

=== Other products and services 2006 ===
IDR took advantage of opportunities in the media market starting in 2006. This included:

- It Started the Internet journal point.ru. It covers online news, financial news, themed pages on different topics, an events calendar, and general interest content.
- The company started providing printing services for advertising and design agencies, book printers.
- The company started providing information to the media market.

=== Closure of BusinessWeek Russian version in 2008 ===
Three years after the Russian version of BusinessWeek magazine went on sale in Russia, the Rodionov Publishing House decided to close the project, saying the journal format was not popular on the domestic market. BusinessWeek spokesperson Patricia A. Strauss said the magazine would evaluate other projects for the Russian market. The license agreement expired on 30 June 2008.

Yevgeny Dodolev, publishing director of the Rodionov Publishing House's business publications group, said the BusinessWeek format had never been popular with the Russian market. "We have decided to close the unprofitable magazine because there is no advertising; and the project has not recouped itself," Dodolev told the paper. He said there were no profitable U.S. weekly magazines in Russia. Although our publishing house has invested over $10 million in the magazine since 2005, the project has not even reached breakeven point, Dodolev said. TNS Gallup AdFact managing director Ruslan Tagiyev said there were already 15 weeklies on the stagnant local market. He said BusinessWeek was among the last to enter the market and found it difficult to promote itself.

The Russian team proved unable to combine the Western brand and the needs of Russian readers. Top managers at media companies with major assets, such as Independent Media Sanoma Magazines, Kommersant, RosBusinessConsulting, United Media, Seven Days and Media-3, said they had not interest in buying BusinessWeek's license."

== See also ==
- Novy Vzglyad
