= Marino Parisotto =

Italian photographer

Marino Parisotto Vay (8 December 1962 – 17 November 2022), commonly known as Marino Parisotto, was an Italian photographer.

== Biography ==
=== Youth ===
Marino Parisotto was born to Italian parents in Sudbury, Canada. After his family returned to Italy, he attended schools in Lombardy, although he remained very attached to Veneto, his family's region of origin. He studied Business Economics at the Università Cattolica del Sacro Cuore in Milan.

Already fascinated by the world of fashion, he joined the ranks of the renowned fashion agency Fashion Models, walking the runway for esteemed brands such as Gianfranco Ferré and becoming the face of fashion designer Gian Marco Venturi. Soon internationally recognized, his early career took him as far as Japan.

With a degree in economics, he took advantage of his fame as a model to found, together with a fellow student, an advertising agency dealing exclusively with fashion and beauty brands, called Le Officine Creative, where he served as artistic director.

=== The beginnings ===
Soon, his creative impulses led him to take up the camera for some trusting clients. After an initial series in Morocco, he gained almost immediate fame with a major campaign in the United States for the jeans brand POP84, featuring the then-unknown future supermodel Shana Zadrick. The photo chosen for the poster campaign was so sensual that the posters were frequently stolen, leading to reports in Italian newspapers. Originally an advertising brochure, the book was soon published as an art book titled "Bella da Strappare," marking his first public success.

"Photo", the world's best-selling French photography magazine, discovered the press articles and was enthusiastic about this young, previously unknown photographer. His French career was launched, and he soon signed with the great couturier Hubert de Givenchy, who entrusted him with the artistic direction of his last two campaigns before retiring in 1995 in favor of John Galliano.

In Italy, the German cosmetics brand Wella commissioned him to create a black-and-white art book featuring "black angels" and "white angels" on a deserted Miami beach, expressing his visions of the world, life, love, spirituality, and the complex relationship between man and the image and soul of women. This series was the subject of his first major exhibition in Paris, sponsored by the Publimod workshop.

Projects quickly followed between France and Italy. "Black & White Angels" became a landmark, influencing other major fashion photographers like Peter Lindbergh. A year later, Parisotto responded with the book "Sky over New York," under the auspices of Wella, in which his divine essences fly over New York City to express love and compassion for humankind. This book, sold in major bookstores worldwide, soon sold out.

Giorgio Armani asked him to contribute around 30 pages, including the cover, for his prestigious Emporio Armani Magazine. For this series, Parisotto reinvented the myth of Icarus' flight. The cover photo was so remarkable that Armani displayed it on the famous "Armani wall" on Milan's Via Broletto, spanning the full height of the eight-story building housing the fashion house.

=== Lingerie photographer ===
The lingerie brand La Perla gave him carte blanche to reinvent the brand's message at a time when porn-chic was making a dazzling comeback in fashion. For La Perla, Parisotto produced international advertising campaigns and prestigious books, showcasing his keen sense of the female form with increasingly sensual shots that never become overtly sexual.

He honed his signature style, featuring evanescent sylphs with long, elegant legs, which a new generation of photographers sought to emulate. His style is defined by often black-and-white shots in grand natural settings, supported by cinematic lighting. His photographs emphasize action and the power of seduction.

Most of his photos for the brand were published in limited-edition art books that sold out quickly in bookstores. His book "Senso" (1997), with a print run of ten thousand copies, was distributed by Fnac and sold out in less than six months. La Perla's American advertising campaign, based on one of the book's most sensual images, caused a stir, with some magazines refusing to publish it due to being "politically incorrect."

Increasingly uninhibited in his storytelling, Parisotto's last collaboration with the brand featured a series called "Backseat," set in the backseats of limousines. This series, combining women and luxury cars, landed him on the cover of Playboy magazine with supermodel Adriana Karembeu.

The Austrian brand Wolford, after the death of its historic photographer Helmut Newton in 2004, saw Marino Parisotto as a worthy successor. They invited him to be even more transgressive than he had been for La Perla. Initially more romantic, Parisotto explored a new facet of sensuality in a timely study of the human soul.

=== An international reputation ===
At the same time, Parisotto signed numerous worldwide advertising campaigns, establishing himself as a leading figure in the profession.

Iceberg offered him his first perfume campaign, where he also directed the advertising film.

Rochas relied on his talent for the global launch of its new fragrance Alchimie, and later to relaunch an old fragrance, Toquade.

The crystal company Baccarat entrusted him with their ambitious 1998 campaign, which, despite the absence of digital effects, won first prize from the Club des Directeurs Artistiques.

Major brands like Swatch, Mikimoto, Rémy Martin, Roberto Cavalli, Enrico Coveri, Sergio Rossi, Bergdorf Goodman, Swarovski, Corneliani, Rocco Barocco, Carte Noire, Oenobiol, Mitsubishi, and FIAT also relied on his talent.

=== Calendar photographer ===
The Lavazza coffee brand entrusted him with the creation of their 1998 calendar, featuring twelve images that evoke sensuality, strength, and passion, with models such as Scott Benoit and Leticia Herrera.

Recognized as a leading photographer, Parisotto produced calendars for various Italian entities, including Miss Italy and Campari, which featured Eva Mendes in 2008. Set on a Tuscan beach, the calendar included shots of Mendes posing as Little Red Riding Hood with a real wolf.

Russian media mogul Sergey Rodionov also enlisted him for the NU AGE calendar, featuring his wife, actress and model Olga Rodionova.

=== Celebrity photographer ===
France was the first country to recognize him as a "celebrity photographer". Femme magazine gave him the opportunity to shoot a series in an original Orient Express carriage with singer Patricia Kaas.

Photo magazine then commissioned him to work with the enigmatic French star Mylène Farmer. This first photo shoot on the rooftops of Paris, featuring clothing from the Thierry Mugler Museum, marked the start of a long-term collaboration, including the album cover for "Innamoramento" and the poster for the "Mylenium Tour".

Mainly for Max magazine, he photographed numerous Italian actresses, as well as top models and international stars like Hugh Grant, Daniel Day-Lewis, Eva Green, Michael Fassbender, Klaus Maria Brandauer, Udo Kier, Karen Mulder, Laetitia Casta, Victoria Silvstedt, Rachel Roberts, Janice Dickinson and Tereza Maxová.

== Style and photographic technique ==
Marino Parisotto developed a distinctive photographic style, characterized by meticulous attention to light, contrasts, and composition. He worked exclusively with analog photography, avoiding any digital post production. The choice of film was a fundamental aspect of his creative process: he favored 35mm rolls with color variations ranging from classic black and white to sepia, as well as more intense tonalities.

One of the defining features of his work was the use of natural light, often combined with continuous artificial lighting inspired by cinematography. Many of his shots were enhanced through backlighting, a technique that allowed him to create evocative atmospheres and emphasize the three-dimensionality of his subjects. Expansive natural landscapes—such as deserts, beaches, and seas—were recurring settings in his photography, serving as "blank canvases" upon which he composed images rich in dynamism and energy.

Parisotto drew inspiration from classical sculpture, particularly ancient Greek art, seeking perfect proportions and aesthetic harmony in his work. This influence is evident in many of his black-and-white photographs, which emphasize the human body as an object of strength and beauty. His images, often centered on artistic nude photography of both men and women, blur the line between glamour photography and art, exploring the theme of seduction with a balance of elegance and provocation.

Parisotto's aesthetic is strongly linked to the 1990s, a period when photography was shaped by visual contrasts and cultural experimentation. Through black and white, he neutralized the purely commercial aspect of photography, adding depth and realism to his compositions. His color photography, on the other hand, recalls the masterful use of color seen in Caravaggio’s paintings. The dramatic interplay of contrasts and light served to heighten the emotional intensity and three-dimensionality of his subjects. His preference for deep tones and intense saturations—marked by dark, earthy colors—conveyed strength and vitality, creating a visual dialogue between body and environment.

== Acknowledgements ==
- Parisotto received two gold awards for photography from the International Art Directors Club.
- In 2002 Parisotto obtained the American Award of Photography for the photo shoot Badtime stories created for Vibe magazine.
- On 17 February 2024, a memorial tile was placed in his honor on the "Muretto delle Piastrelle" in Albenga, Italy.

== Books ==
- Bella da Strappare, 1993
- Black & White Angels, 1994
- domani, 1994
- Sky over New York, 1995
- Soviet, 1995
- Senso, 1997
- La Perla Tropico, 1998
- La Perla Swing, 1998
- Backseat, 1999
- La Perla Lanzarote, 1999
- La Perla Mare, 2000
- Excess, 2002
- La Perla. Idoli, 2011

== Exhibitions ==
- Angeli in bianco e nero – Paris 1993
- Soviet Crazy Nights – Bar Fly – Paris 1995
- Excess – Mandala Ray – Paris 2002
- La Perla – La Rinascente Milan 2010
- Milano PhotoWeek e Photofestival – 2019
- Marino Parisotto Personal Best - Milan 2024 (organized by Archivio Marino Parisotto)
- Archivio Marino Parisotto x Gianni Di Muro Atelier - Alassio 2024 (organized by Archivio Marino Parisotto)

== Sources ==
- De Sigaldi, Calypso (2023). MODELMANIA. Un demi-siècle dans les coulisses de l'image de mode. Bookelis. ISBN 979-10-359-8327-7.
