= Moskovskaya Komsomolka =

Moskovskaya Komsomolka weekly
- Type: Alternative weekly
- Format: Tabloid
- Owner(s): Boris Berezovsky
- Publisher: Yevgeny Dodolev
- Editor: Marina Lesko
- Managing editor: Dmitrii Bykov
- Founded: 1999
- Ceased publication: 2001
- Headquarters: Moscow, Russia
- Circulation: From 75.000 in 1999 down to 25,500 in 2001
- Website: NewLookMedia

Moskovskaya Komsomolka was a satirical newspaper published weekly in Russia (1999-2001). The newspaper had a fixed 32 page layout.

== History ==
Founded by Boris Berezovsky and Yevgeny Dodolev, it featured investigative journalism and leaks from sources inside the Russian business world, as well as a large number of cartoons. Its history saw a number of stunts. It published so-called "leaks" from administration officials, including information from whistle-blowers.

Oleg Mitvol gave the newspaper its name. In September 1999 the first issue was published.

Valeriya Novodvorskaya called Moskovskaya Komsomolka the most provocative newspaper in Russia.

Although the Moskovskaya Komsomolka never lost its touches of humor, it soon established itself as a forum for serious journalism. its writers included Dmitrii Bykov, Sergey Dorenko, Marina Lesko and Eduard Limonov.

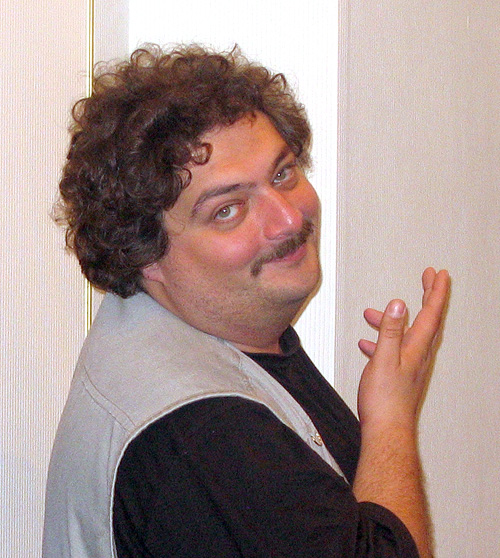
Dmitrii Bykov

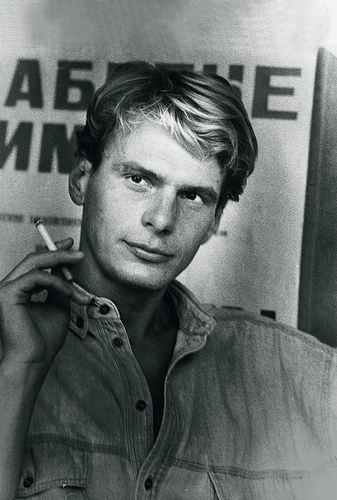
Evgeny Dodolev

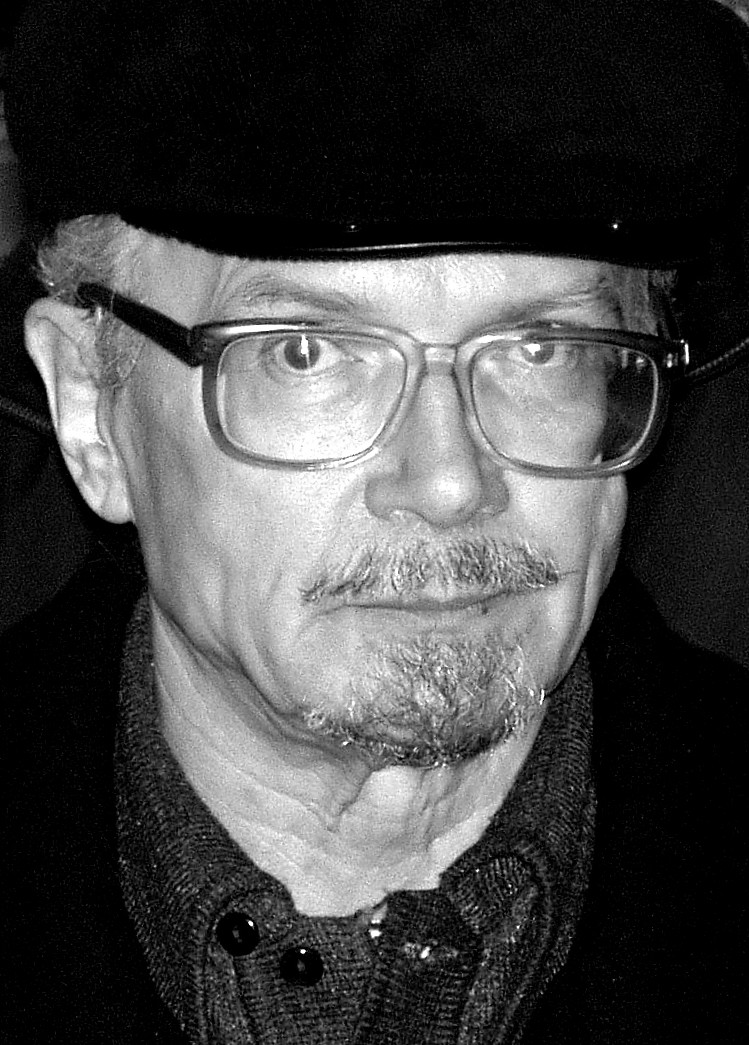
Eduard Limonov

== See also ==
- The eXile
- Alexander Nevzorov
