= Der Spiegel-Profil =

Ukrainian magazine

- Editor-in-Chief: Mikhail Leontyev
- Categories: Newsmagazine
- Frequency: Weekly
- Circulation: 27,600 / week
- Publisher: Evgeny Dodolev & Rodionov Publishing House
- First issue: 4 November 2007
- Final issue: 2008
- Country: Ukraine
- Language: Russian
- Website: Official site

Der Spiegel-Profil (in Ukrainian, Der Spiegel-Профiль) was a Ukrainian weekly magazine, published in Kyiv, started in 2007 and shuttered in 2008 due to being financially unsustainable.

== Overview ==
The first edition of the Der Spiegel-Profil was published in Kyiv. Its release was sponsored by the Russian company (Rodionov Publishing House). From the first edition Mikhail Leontyev held the position of editor-in-chief and from the very start the publication has been headquartered in Moscow because the Ukrainian government banned Leontyev from visiting the country for five years, referring to his "insulting statements" towards Ukraine.

Der Spiegel-Profil was similar in style and layout to both licensers, German Der Spiegel and Russian Профиль (spells like Profil).

== Controversy ==
More notable has been a series of articles in 'Profil', a weekly news magazine published in partnership with leading German weekly 'Der Spiegel'. Editor Mikhail Leontev has taken to pushing the 'renewal of empire' line. In the latest issue, he gave space to Dugin; since the Georgian conflict, four prominent mainstream analysts have written articles promoting the notion of Russia as an empire.

In this particular regard, Germany, namely the influential Hamburg magazine DER SPIEGEL, does play a rather dubious role: DER SPIEGEL lends its name and reputation to one of Moscow’s major publication projects in Ukraine - the infamous weekly “Der Spiegel - Profil”. This coloured high-circulation journal is edited by Mikhail Leontev, a well-known Russian anti-Western propagandist, former “persona non grata” in Ukraine, founding member of neo-fascist Alexander Dugin’s “Eurasia” Movement, etc. One could argue though that the primitiveness of “Der Spiegel – Profil’s” anti-Ukrainianism has the unintended effect of supporting pro-NATO forces in Ukraine (reminding the ambivalent repercussions of transmissions in Ukraine of the dubious television reports from Kyiv by Russian TV “journalists”). And, DER SPIEGEL, it appears, is assisting in this. Yet, this would be a strange way, indeed, for German journalists to contribute to further improvement of relations between Ukraine and the West.

== Development ==
Like nearly all magazines, Der Spiegel-Profil suffered from a decline in advertising during the 2008 recession. Publisher ended its one-year print run for magazine, due to economic difficulties and kept only online version (terminating license agreement with German magazine Der Spiegel).

== See also ==
- List of magazines in Ukraine
