= Moskovskaya Pravda =

Daily morning Russian newspaper

Московская правда
- Type: Daily newspaper
- Format: Broadsheet
- Editor: Muladjanov Shod Saidovich (Муладжанов Шод Саидович)
- Founded: 1918
- Language: Russian language
- Headquarters: 123846 Moscow, 1905 year street, 7
- Circulation: 300,000
- Website: mospravda.ru

Moskovskaya pravda (Russian: Московская правда, "Moscow Truth", in the transliteration system used by the Library of Congress spelled "Moskovskaia pravda"), is a daily morning newspaper of Russia, and formerly of the Soviet Union.

== History ==
Moskovskaja Pravda is the first and oldest daily newspaper in Moscow. It was first published in 1918. On March 18, 1920 the newspaper was renamed Communist Labor and became part of the Moscow Committee of the RCP and the Moscow Council. On February 19, 1950 it was renamed again and published under the name Moscow truth.

In 1986 Michail Poltoranin was named as chief editor by the First Secretary of the Moscow City Communist Party Committee Boris Yeltsin.

On its 50th anniversary, the newspaper was awarded the Order of Red Banner of Labor.

On June 30, 2016 the last printed issue was published.

== See also ==
- Evgeny Dodolev
- Marina Lesko
- Moskovskaya Komsomolka
