= Edward Topol =

Russian writer, film producer and screenwriter

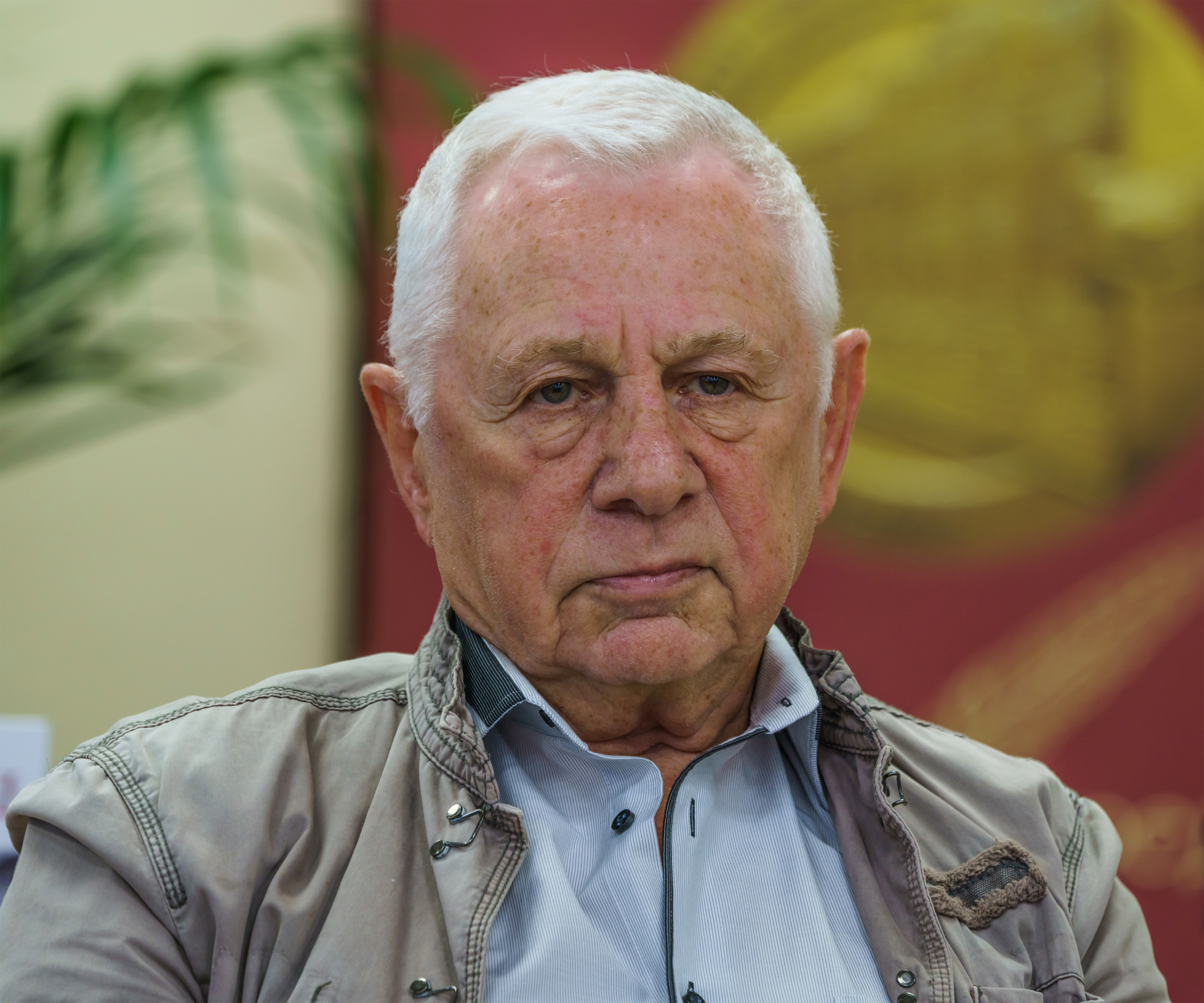
- Born: October 8, 1938 (age 87); Baku, Azerbaijani SSR, Soviet Union
- Occupations: Novelist, screen writer, essayist.
- Writing career
- Genre: Drama
- Notable works: Tomorrow in Russia; Red Square

Eduard Vladimirovich Topol (Russian: Эдуа́рд Влади́мирович То́поль), real name Topelberg (Russian: Топельберг) (born 8 October 1938), is a Russian writer, film producer and screenwriter.

== Biography ==
Born in Baku, Topol spent his teenage years finishing local school in Baku and graduated from Azerbaijan State Economic University. He did his military service in Estonia. He worked as journalist for newspapers such as Bakinskiy Rabochiy and Komsomolskaya Pravda and wrote the screenplays for seven movies, of which two were banned due to censorship under the Soviet government.

In 1978 he emigrated to USA, New York City, and lived for short periods in Boston, Toronto and Miami. Topol resides in Netanya, Israel since 2017.

== Personal life ==
He married twice and has one daughter and one son.

== Bibliography ==
Russian

- Red Square
- Submarine U-137
- Journalist for Brezhnev
- Strange Face
- Tomorrow in Russia
- Red Snow
- Krazny gaz (1986); translated in English: Red Gas (1987)

English

- Dermo!: The Real Russian Tolstoy Never Used (A book on Russian language)

== See also ==
- The Pyramid. The Soviet Mafia
