= The Pyramid. The Soviet Mafia =

1990 novel by Telman Gdlyan and Evgeny Dodolev

The Pyramid
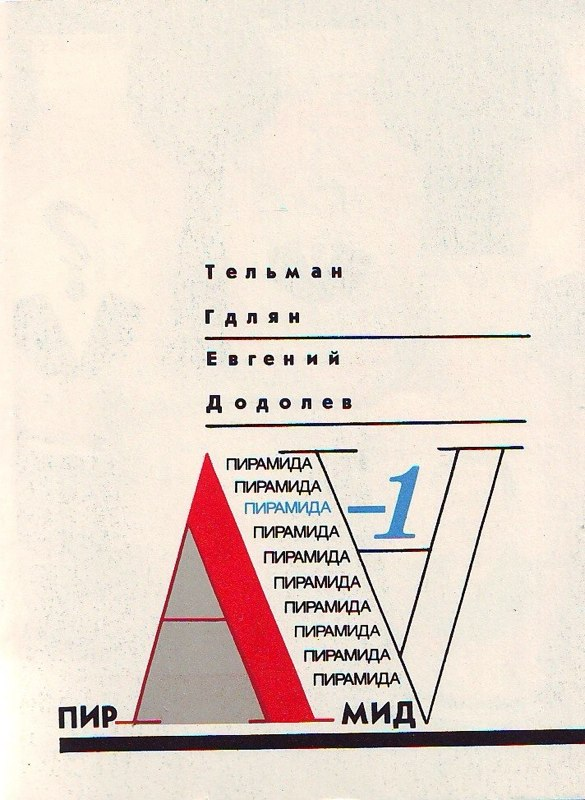
- First edition cover
- Author: Telman Gdlyan, Evgeny Dodolev
- Language: Russian
- Genre: Spy, Thriller, Historical novel
- Publisher: APS
- Publication date: 27 September 1990
- Publication place: Soviet Union
- Media type: Print (Hardback & Paperback)
- Pages: 260 pp (first edition, hardback)
- Preceded by: The Processes ISBN 5-235-00980-0
- Followed by: The Mafia in Times of Lawlessness ISBN 978-5-8079-0222-1

The Pyramid (1990) (Russian: Пирамида-1, Romanized: Piramida) is a thriller novel by Soviet special investigator and deputy of Soviet Parliament Telman Gdlyan and professional writer Evgeny Dodolev, about Soviet Mafia. It is the first Soviet book about corruption. The book allegedly exposed ties between Leonid Brezhnev's family, Sharof Rashidov and the Soviet Mafia.

With their critical viewpoint of Soviet governmental corruption, co-authors were targeted by the government.

According to Edward Topol the already printed book was banned in 1989, then released a year and half later, one year before the dissolution of the Soviet Union.

== Plot summary ==
The 260 pages of the book are divided into 27 chapters.

The first part describes the motives for the Soviet corruption.

The second part shows how Soviet Intelligence finds out about the so-called Uzbek Affair.

To the common Russians, some names in this book became synonymous with corruption, nepotism and the Great Cotton Scandal of the late Brezhnev period.

Last, there are a few episodes from the life of Brezhnev's family (Galina Brezhneva and others).

== Film adaptation ==
- The Pyramid (Lenfilm, 1990)

== See also ==
- Vitaly Korotich
