= Imperial (bank) =

Imperial Bank
- Native name: Банк «Империал»
- Romanized name: Bank "Imperial"
- Type: Privately held company
- Industry: Financial services
- Founded: 1990 in Moscow, Russia
- Defunct: 2004
- Fate: Bankrupted, License Revoked
- Headquarters: Moscow, Russia
- Area served: Russia
- Key people: S. S. Rodionov, R. I. Vyakhirev
- Products: Banking services
- Subsidiaries: Bank "Slavyansky"

Imperial bank (Russian: Банк «Империал») was private Russian bank, renowned in the 1990s for its advertising series "World History", that became defunct in 2004.

== History ==
The joint-stock bank "Imperial" was registered in Moscow on December 28, 1990. Conceived during the time of Soviet Union, Imperial was intended to be the backbone bank of the now defunct Soviet Neftegazprom (Russian: Нефтегазпром) which was a project by a group of Soviet technocratic executives to gain a monopoly on the export of Soviet oil and gas, but whose ideological line was subsequently continued, on a much smaller scale, by Gazprom. The General License of the Central Bank of the Russian Federation for conducting banking operations in rubles and foreign currencies was granted to the bank on January 29, 1993. In the mid-1990s, the bank engaged in active commercial activities. It played a significant role in the settlement of debts of the former USSR. During this period, its shareholders included Gazprom and the Vagit Alekperov associated firm Lukoil Oil Company. In 1995, it joined the international payment system VISA International, becoming the first bank in Russia to issue VISA plastic cards with ruble coverage.

Imperial's formation coincided with Valentin Pavlov transitioning from the Minister of Finance to Prime Minister of the USSR. His "Pavlov Plan", which was planned to be completed by 1993, was a Soviet antithesis to the "Marshall Plan" for both the Soviet Union and the GDR in which emergency completions for pipelines with greater capacities of export oil and natural gas would be financed by confiscating hard currency from Soviet citizens to buy pipes, construction machines, compressors and other pipeline equipment from the West. With the significant increase in the sale of hydrocarbons from the Soviet Union to the West especially Germany, the USSR would gain much needed hard currency. Germany, initially interested in Soviet energy carriers, worked with the Soviet Union in those years under the "oil in exchange for pipes" scheme but fell under pressure from the United States to slow down the purchase of supplies in every possible way. But luck would support Pavlov by coinciding with the moment when the "oil in exchange for pipes" scheme occurred was when Gorbachev "gifted the GDR" to West Germany and in that short period the United States did not have the slightest opportunity to prevent the "oil for pipes" program from occurring. With hard currency from these hyrdocarbon sales, both Gazprom, which did not become Neftegazprom due to the merger of the oil industry, and the newly created joint-stock company Lukoil became the founders of the bank Imperial at the end of 1991.

Both Alexander Lebedev and Andrey Kostin, who had both worked together supporting the Kremlin's economic interests at the Soviet embassy in London, joined Imperial to support the "Pavlov Plan" in the winter of 1992-93 and August 1993, respectively. They were both promised administrative resources and financial flows of gas and oil workers. Lebedev headed Imperial's the foreign investment department and Kostin was his deputy. Before obtaining a license to conduct foreign exchange transactions in 1993, Imperial used Lebedev's company Russian Investment and Finance Company (JSC RIFK) (Russian: «Русская инвестиционно-финансовая компания» (РИФК)) to conduct its transactions on Soviet debts through RIFK's foreign accounts. (Note: According to Andrey Vavilov, only four banks were allowed to buy the Russian government debts: Menatep, National Credit, Stolichny and Imperial.) For the same purposes, Kostin used Imperial instead of RIFK which was very profitable for both Imperial and Kostin, who acted as an employee of the bank and took a share of Imperial's profits. Rodionov said "His company [RIFK] began to earn much more than his management in the bank. It was a conflict of interest that resolved naturally, Lebedev left." (Note: For $400,000 through his Russian Investment and Finance Company (RIFK), Alexander Lebedev in the spring of 1995 after he left Imperial bought Oleg Boyko's National Reserve Bank (NRBank) (Russian: Национальный резервный банк («НРБанк»)), which was more of an investment fund than what the West would call a bank, was an authorized representative in the domestic currency bond market (OVVZ), which were securities issued by the Ministry of Finance in exchange for the debt of Vnesheconombank of the USSR to Russian foreign trade enterprises, and made NRB one of the first holders of "VEBOV".)

Beginning in 1994, the head of security at Imperial was Boris Antonovich Boyarskov (Russian: Борис Антонович Боярсков; born 9 July 1953, Leningrad). (Note: After his work at Imperial, Boris Antonovich Boyarskov was considered for the head of security at the Central Bank of Russia but became a deputy branch manager and later a vice president for Evrofinance Bank (Russian: банка "Еврофинанс"). While at Evrofinance, he supervised investment projects in the media for three years including transactions for TRK Petersburg and other media including the purchase of shares in NTV and thus transferring NTV's controlling stake from Vladimir Gusinsky's Media Most to Gazprom-Media by 14 April 2001. He led the transition of media concerns in Russia from the Yeltsin era to the Putin era. Boyarskov ensured that Evrofinance owned stakes in Gazprom-Media (NTV, TNT, Echo of Moscow, Seven Days Publishing House (Russian: ИД "Семь дней")) and the Petersburg television company (TRK Petersburg) (Russian: ТРК Петербург). In December 2003, JSCB Evrofinance merged with CB Mosnarbank to form JSCB Evrofinance Mosnarbank. With support from St Petersburg Security Forces, Boyarskov later headed Rossvyazokhrankultura from 22 March 2007 until 2 June 2008 and, as of 2024, is alleged to be a retired KGB general, is very close to Igor Sechin of Rosneft but was often at odds with Mikhail Lesin and Mikhail Seslavinsky while Seslavinsky was at Rospechat (Russian: Роспечать).)

By 1997, the bank's own capital was 1.359 trillion rubles, and the "Imperial" bank group included a number of enterprises and organizations from various sectors of the economy: 2 Moscow commercial banks, 4 branches (in Saint Petersburg, Kaliningrad, Perm, and Volgograd), 1 branch, 4 operational offices, and exchange offices in Moscow. There were plans to open branches of JSC "Imperial" in Novorossiysk, Astrakhan, Kirov, and other cities in Russia.

In 1995, after an article in the newspaper Moscow News, the Department for Economic Crimes of the Moscow Main Internal Affairs Directorate investigated the activities of the bank's head S. Rodionov, his wife, and Minister A. Fomin for embezzlement of budget funds. The case "was hushed up," and the author of the article in "Moscow News" was offered money for silence by unknown individuals.

The economic crisis that erupted in 1998 dealt a severe blow to Russia's banking sector, including Bank "Imperial". On August 25, 1998, the Central Bank of the Russian Federation revoked the bank's license.

In May 1999, the bank was declared bankrupt, but the circumstances raised questions and suspicions of fraud among experts.

The rapid bankruptcy of Bank "Imperial" became one of the most scandalous and mysterious cases in the modern history of Russian credit institutions.

— The End of World History

In July 1999, a court made an unprecedented decision by prohibiting the Central Bank from revoking "Imperial's" license.

In 2000, the bank was supported by Lukoil, and by 2004, it had restructured its debts, with shareholders selling their shares at a discount. The bank's assets were transferred to Lukoil. In 2004, Lukoil ceased to provide financial support to the bank. The bank, never fully recovering from the crisis, lost its license again on January 20, 2004, "due to the bank's failure to comply with federal laws regulating banking activities, as well as the regulations of the Bank of Russia, its inability to meet creditors' demands on monetary obligations, and fulfill its obligations to pay mandatory payments".

In 2017, a group of investors attempted to register a bank under the name "Imperial" once again.

== Leadership ==
Over the years, the bank's leadership included:

- Chairman of the Board of Directors of the Bank
  - 1994—1995 — R. I. Vyakhirev (from 1996, chairman of the Board of Trustees of this bank) — simultaneously served as chairman of the Board of Directors of "Gazprom".
- Chairman of the Management Board — Maxim Trokhov.
- President — Sergey Rodionov, resigned on July 6, 1998

== Popular culture ==
The bank's advertising video clips, which aired over a five-year period, became a cultural event for Russian society. The 18 commercials were seen as genuine works of art. During the filming of this advertising, the talent of director Timur Bekmambetov was revealed, earning awards at festivals.

== Sources ==
- Budberg, Alexander (2000-06-06). "The End of World History". Moskovsky Komsomolets. Archived from the original on 2020-05-13.
- Frankl, Vladimir (1996-12-18). "How Bank "Imperial" Proved Its Loyalty to Catherine the Great". New Look. Archived from the original on 2017-03-14.
- Guriev, Sergey, "World History: Imperial Bank", Credit History: Two Booms and Three Busts of the Russian Financial System (Video lecture), Open University
- Gosteva, Elena (2017-04-01). "Bank "Imperial" Returns from World History". Bankir.ru. Archived from the original on 2017-04-01.
- Parfyonov, Leonid. Всемирная история. Банк «Империал» [World History. Imperial Bank]. Онлайн-версия «Намедни. Наша Эра» [Online version of "Namedni. Our Era"] (in Russian). Vol. 1991–2000. Archived from the original on 2017-06-18.
- Zhelobanov, Daniil (2004-01-26). "Bank "Imperial" Died Again". Kommersant Money. Archived from the original on 2011-04-08.
