= Sergey Sergeevich Rodionov =

Russian publisher and banker

Sergey Rodionov
- Born: Sergey S. Rodionov; July 29, 1961 (age 65); Moscow, Russia.
- Education: Financial University under the Government of the Russian Federation
- Occupations: Chairman of the board of Rodionov Publishing House; CEO of Domus Participation Sarl Luxembourg (real estate company)

Sergey Sergeevich Rodionov (Russian: Серге́й Сергеевич Родио́нов; born 29 July 1961) is a Russian publisher and banker. He was the founder, co-owner and CEO of Rodionov Publishing House until 2004. He was also the deputy chairman of the Central Bank of Russia in 1991.

== Early life ==
He was born on July 29, 1961, in Moscow. His father is Sergey Petrovich Rodionov who later was the vice-president of JSCB "Imperial" and main owner and chairman of the board of directors Slavyansky Bank.

From 1978 to 1983, he attended the Moscow Institute of Finance (now Financial University under the Government of the Russian Federation) Kibalchicha str 1. Moscow. He pursued his studies in the Faculty of "International Economic Relations," earning a diploma with honors as an "Economist - Banking and foreign exchange operations".

1983–1986: Postgraduate at the same Institute at the department for International Monetary Operations. Ph.D. in Economics for "Analysis of Monetary Theory and Policy of Federal Reserve System of USA".

== Career ==
1986–1988: Senior researcher in the Computer Centre of the Academy of Social Sciences, Moscow.

1988–1991:

- Head of Department of Scientific and Research centre of The State of The USSR (now Central Bank of Russia).
- Economic Adviser of The chairman of the Board of The Central Bank of Russia.
- Director of the General Directorate of commercial banks of the Central Bank of Russia (registration, regulation, audit, control, compliance, payment system, forex, credits of all types - i.e. whole sphere of relations between Central bank and other credit institutes).
- Deputy Chairman of The Central Bank of Russia.

From December 1991 to 1992, Rodionov was chairman of the board of the bank MENATEP which later was owned by the Yukos Owner Mikhail Khodorkovsky.

On 1 April 1992, Rodionov replaced Maxim Trokhov (Russian: Максим Трохов) (Note: Allegedly, Maxim Trokhov (Russian: Максим Трохов) was close to Otari Vitalievich Kvantrishvili.) as chairman, President of the Board of Imperial Bank (Russian: "Империал Банк") and continued as chairman until June 1998. (Note: For his first financial joint project, Alexander Mamut and Andrey Gloriozov (Russian: Андрей Глориозов) from Vnesheconombank created JSCB Business and Cooperation (Russian: АКБ «Бизнес и Сотрудничество»), which, later, was registered as the bank Imperial (Russian: банк «Империал»)) on 12 December 1990 according to the Russian Central Bank (CBR) (Russian: Центральный банк Российской Федерации).) Through Lukoil and Gazprom, Imperial focused on oil and natural gas supplies, respectively, to East Germany and later to Germany including the oil-for-pipes program. At Imperial were the Chairman of Supervising Board - Rem Viakhirev, Vagit Alekperov, whose Lukoil was the largest petroleum account at Imperial, and other members of board- Andrey L. Kostin, Alexander Lebedev, Sergey Konstantinovich Dubinin, who, from 1994 to 1995 handled the financial affairs of the natural gas firm Gazprom which was the largest account at Imperial. (Note: In 1995 before Yeltsin began his Russian presidential campaign, Boris Yeltsin appointed Andrey Kostin to head Vnesheconombank to manage former Soviet debts. With Vnesheconombank managing Soviet debt, Imperial began speculating in GKOs but collapsed following the demise of the GKO market following the 1998 financial collapse in Russia. On 25 August 1998, the Central Bank of Russia suspended Imperial's license and on 30 September 1998 Imperial entered bankruptcy with Vyacheslav Medvedev (Russian: Вячеслав Медведев) appointed as interim manager. On 17 April 2000, Imperial Bank was dissolved.) From 1992 until 2000, Imperial Bank had a major stake in East-West United Bank (EWUB) Luxembourg. (Note: With the support of Mr. Pierre Werner, who was the Prime Minister of the Grand Duchy of Luxembourg, on 12 June 1974, the East-West United Bank (EWUB) Luxembourg was formed with both the State Bank of the USSR or Gosbank and after the end of the Soviet Union, the Central Bank of Russia, and Russia's Foreign Trade Bank Vneshtorgbank (VTB) as the main shareholders from founding until 1992. From 1992 to 2000, Imperial Bank had a major stake in EWUB and from 2000 to 2007, VTB had a major stake. Beginning in 2001, the Vladimir Yevtushenkov led Sistema gained a stake in EWUB and since 2007 Sistema has had the majority stake in EWUB.) (Note: From 1993 to 1994, Alexander Lebedev, who along with Andrey Kostin founded the Russian Investment and Finance Company (RIFK) (Russian: Российская инвестиционно-финансовая компания (РИФК)) and was its chairman of the board, was a manager and head of the RIFK department at Imperial Bank.) After the Vagit Alekperov associated Lukoil acquired the bank Imperial, Sergey Rodionov resigned from Imperial on 6 July 1998.

From September 1996 to March 2006, Rodionov was acting President of the Diners Club company (Russia).

From 1993 to 2000, Rodionov was chairman of the Board of East-West United Bank (EWUB) S.A. Luxembourg, which had a 49% stake owned by Imperial bank. (Note: For over five years – 2000 to 2005 – all stocks of the Russian Foreign Banks were being purchased from the Bank of Russia by VTB Bank.) Andrey Kostin and Vladimir Stolyarenko, who was first deputy chairman of the board, were at Imperial bank from 1993 to 1998 when Stolyarenko transferred to Tokobank (Russian: Токобанк) which held a 28% stake in East-West United Bank in 1998.

From 1996 Chairman of the board of Rodionov Publishing House (Russia).

2000–2001 - Member of the board of EWUB Luxembourg

From 2001 CEO of Domus Participation Sarl Luxembourg (real estate company).

== Personal ==
His first wife is Svetlana Mikhailovna Loshchatova (Russian: Светлана Михайловна Лощатова: born 1960). She is one of the co-founders of the Mikhail Lesin associated Video International CJSC. She graduated from Lomonosov Moscow State University, and later graduated from the Moscow International School of Finance and Banking (Russian: Московская международная финансово-банковская школа) as Candidate of Economic Sciences. From August 1988 to September 1990, she was a junior researcher at the Credit and Finance Research Institute (Russian: Кредитно-финансового НИИ) at the State Bank of the USSR (GosBank USSR) (Russian: Госбанк СССР). From September 1990 to February 1992, she was deputy chairman of the Board of Slavyansky Bank, and, in February 1992, she became chairman of the board of Slavyansky Bank (Russian: банк «Славянский») Moscow, which was a "sister" or subsidiary of Imperial bank. In March 1997, a criminal case was opened against her for causing $2.1 million property damage to the Vladimir Vinogradov (Russian: Владимир Виноградов), (Note: Vladimir Vinogradov (Russian: Владимир Виноградов) was an old friend of Sergei Rodionov and had also worked with Sergei Rodionov at East-West United Bank (EWUB) S.A. Luxembourg,. Rodionov recommended to Vinogradov that Vinogradov open and account for Diffusion Finance S.A.R.L. at the Rodionov's wife headed Slavyansky Bank (Russian: банк «Славянский»); however, the first deputy chairman of EWUB's board, Sergei Patrikeev (Russian: Сергей Патрикеев) said, "Rodionov did not advise anyone and never worked together with Vinogradov in East-West United Bank." (Russian: "Родионов ничего никому не советалов и вместе с Виноградовым в East-West United Bank никогда не работал.").) headed Luxembourg company Diffusion Finance S.A.R.L. which had an account with Slavyansky bank, but the case was later dismissed. Sergey and Svetlana have two children and lived in Luxembourg during the 1990s.

His second wife Olga Gennadievna Rodionova (Russian: Ольга Геннадьевна Родионова; born 25 June 1974) graduated from the Institute of Economics, Management and Law, with a degree in Banking (Russian: Институт экономики, менеджмента и права, по специальности «Банковское дело») in 1996. (Note: Olga Gennadievna Rodionova (Russian: Ольга Геннадьевна Родионова; born 25 June 1974), whose father was educated as a lawyer but worked as a police officer, failed the exams to attend Moscow Law Institute (Russian: Московский юридический институт) and instead became a typist at the central procecutor's office but could not type, so, instead, she worked as an assistant to the deputy chairman of the Central Bank where met Sergey Rodionov, who was one of the deputy chairman of the Central Bank and resigned on the day he met her when she was 19 years old and he was 32 years old.) She is a model and, in 2001, established of the first Vivienne Westwood boutique in Russia located on Stoleshnikov Lane (Russian: Столешников переулок), which is one of the most expensive shopping districts in the world. She and Sergey have a home in Rublyovka, which is one of the most exclusive neighborhoods near Moscow.
