= Andrey Derevyankin =

Russian politician (born 1959)

- Born: July 10, 1959 (age 67); Kamchatka, USSR
- Citizenship: Russia
- Education: Saratov State Academy of Law
- Years active: 1979–present
- Known for: Soviet dissident, former political prisoner
- Spouse: Yuriko Fujiwara (Japan)
- Parent(s): Nikolay Derevyankin, Anastasia Derevyankina (Nazarova)
- Website: andrey-russian.livejournal.com

Andrey Nikolaevich Derevyankin (Russian: Андре́й Никола́евич Деревя́нкин, 10 July 1959) is a politician, Soviet dissident, and former political prisoner in 1984-1987, 1997–1998, 2000–2004.

Andrey Derevyankin was born on 10 July 1959, in Krasnorechensk settlement of the Air Force base situated at Kamchatka peninsula. His father was an Air Force officer. His mother was a teacher.

Andrey Derevyankin political activity is determined by his Orthodox Christian faith as well as the values of Western liberalism.

Andrey Derevyankin participated in the anti-Soviet dissident movement since 1979. In 1980 he was expelled from Saratov State Academy of Law for the activities to create an anti-Soviet group of students. According to the criminal case, "in 1979-1980 while studying at the Academy he admitted the anti-Soviet talks, writing and putting up in Saratov and Tula leaflets calling to engage in an illegal organization "Justice", "showing how to make conspiracy, outlining the need to establish connections with foreigners for the carriage of anti-Soviet literature at the USSR, "suggested the use of experience of the Polish "Solidarity ". Totally he distributed over 200 leaflets".

In 1983 Andrey Derevyankin after the serving in Soviet Army was restored at the Academy of Law and graduated with honour in 1984.

In October 1984 Andrey Derevyankin was arrested by the KGB in Tula city in an attempt to create an independent trade union. He was charged under article 70 part 1 of the Criminal Code (anti-Soviet agitation and propaganda).

In March 1987 Andrey Derevyankin was released.

After his release Andrey Derevyankin went on opposition activity. In May 1988 he took part in the creation of the first opposition party in the Soviet Union - the Democratic Union (DS), participated in the DS' first and second congresses, was elected to its central board. At the same time Andrey Derevyankin worked as a member of the central board of the National Alliance of Russian Solidarists (NTS), the oldest anti-communist organization of Russia.

In September 1993 Andrey Derevyankin left the NTS, because of disagreement with the NTS pro-government course and took part in the defence of Russian Parliament, so called the White House.

Then he worked as a lawyer in several Moscow commercial banks.

In September 1997 Andrey Derevyankin was arrested by the Federal Security Service of Russia (FSB) and placed in the Moscow prison "Matrosskya Tishina". In this prison Andrey Derevyankin withstood a hunger strike lasting 25 days, including a 10 days hunger strike without water. Because the intervention of international human rights organizations (Helsinki Citizen Assembly, etc.) he was released in March 1998.

On May 6, 2000, Andrey Derevyankin was arrested by the FSB in Saratov city. One of the main points of the charges was the creation of the Movement "Ave Maria" website on Internet, which materials were characterized by the court as a call for an armed overthrow of the Vladimir Putin's government and a preparation for creation of illegal armed groups (articles 280 and 208 of the Russian Criminal Code). The jury recognized Andrey Derevyankin "guilty and not deserving of leniency." On December 8, 2000, Saratov regional court sentenced him to four years in prison.

All four years of the imprisonment Andrey Derevyankin spent in solitary confinement.

In 2004 Andrey Derevyankin was released. He went on opposition political activity.

In 2010 he headed the International Committee Katyn 2 to investigate independently the accident with Poland leadership in the plane crash near Smolensk.

According to his political beliefs, Andrey Derevyankin is a Christian Democrat, Westerner, and anti-communist.

== Sources ==
- "58-10.The supervisory proceedings of the USSR Procuracy in cases of anti-Soviet agitation and propaganda. Annotated catalog. March 1953 - 1991." Edited by V.A. Kozlov and S.V. Mironenko. Compiled by O. Edelman, with the participation E.Y. Zavadskaya and O. Lavinsky. - M.: Democracy, 1999 (Russian)
