= Novy Vzglyad =

Russian newspaper

Novy Vzglyad weekly
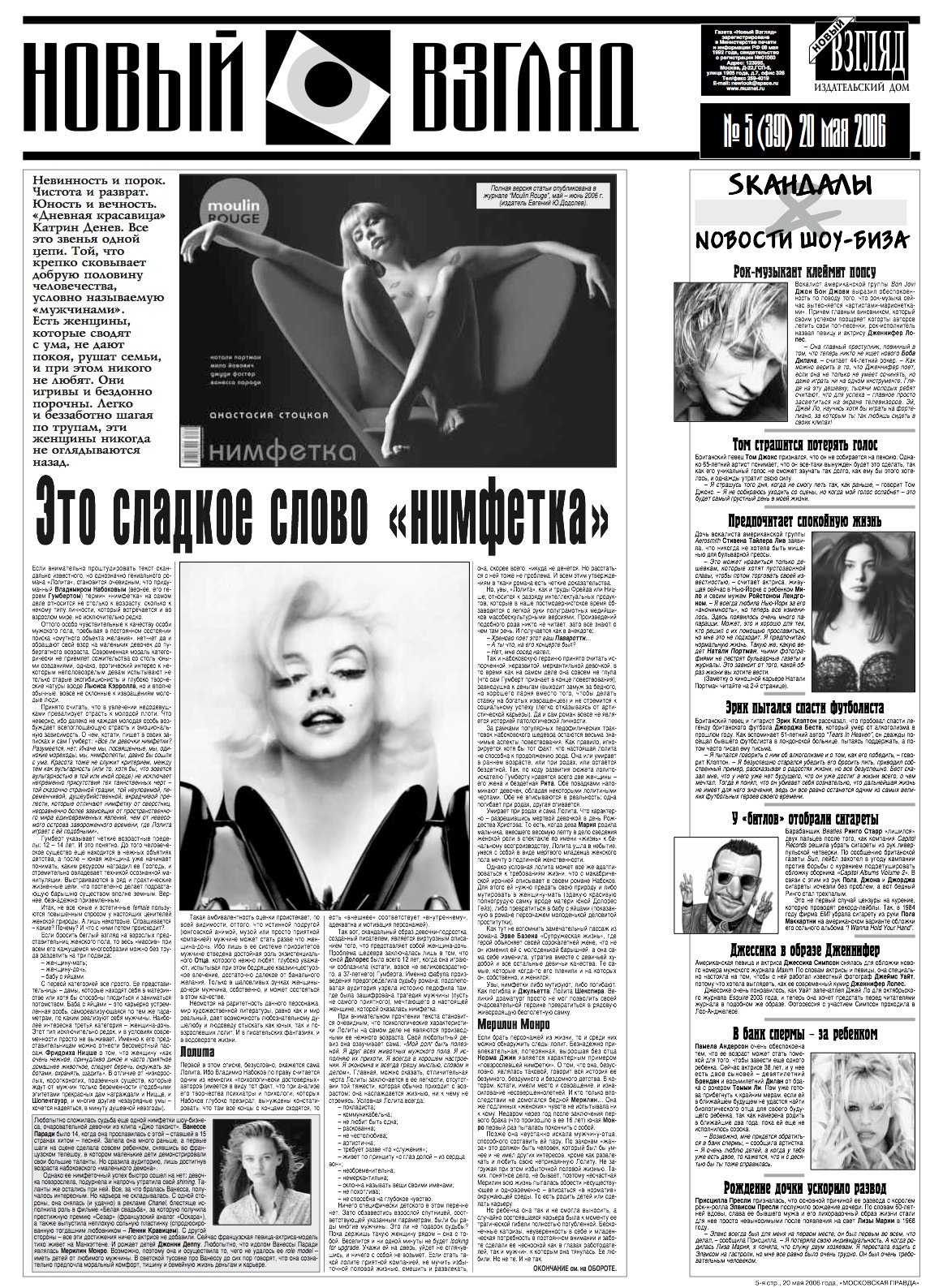
- Front page
- Type: Weekly newspaper
- Format: Broadsheet
- Owner(s): Kirsan Ilyumzhinov & Yevgeny Dodolev
- Publisher: Yevgeny Dodolev
- Editor: Marina Lesko
- Founded: 1992 (as the Vzglyad)
- Headquarters: Moscow, Russia
- Website: newlookmedia.ru

Novy Vzglyad (Russian: Новый Взгляд, literally New Look or New View) is a weekly newspaper published in Moscow, Russia ("Initially conceived as an extension of the popular TV show Vzgliad") . It used to be well known for its commentaries on politics and social issues in the 1990s.

== History ==
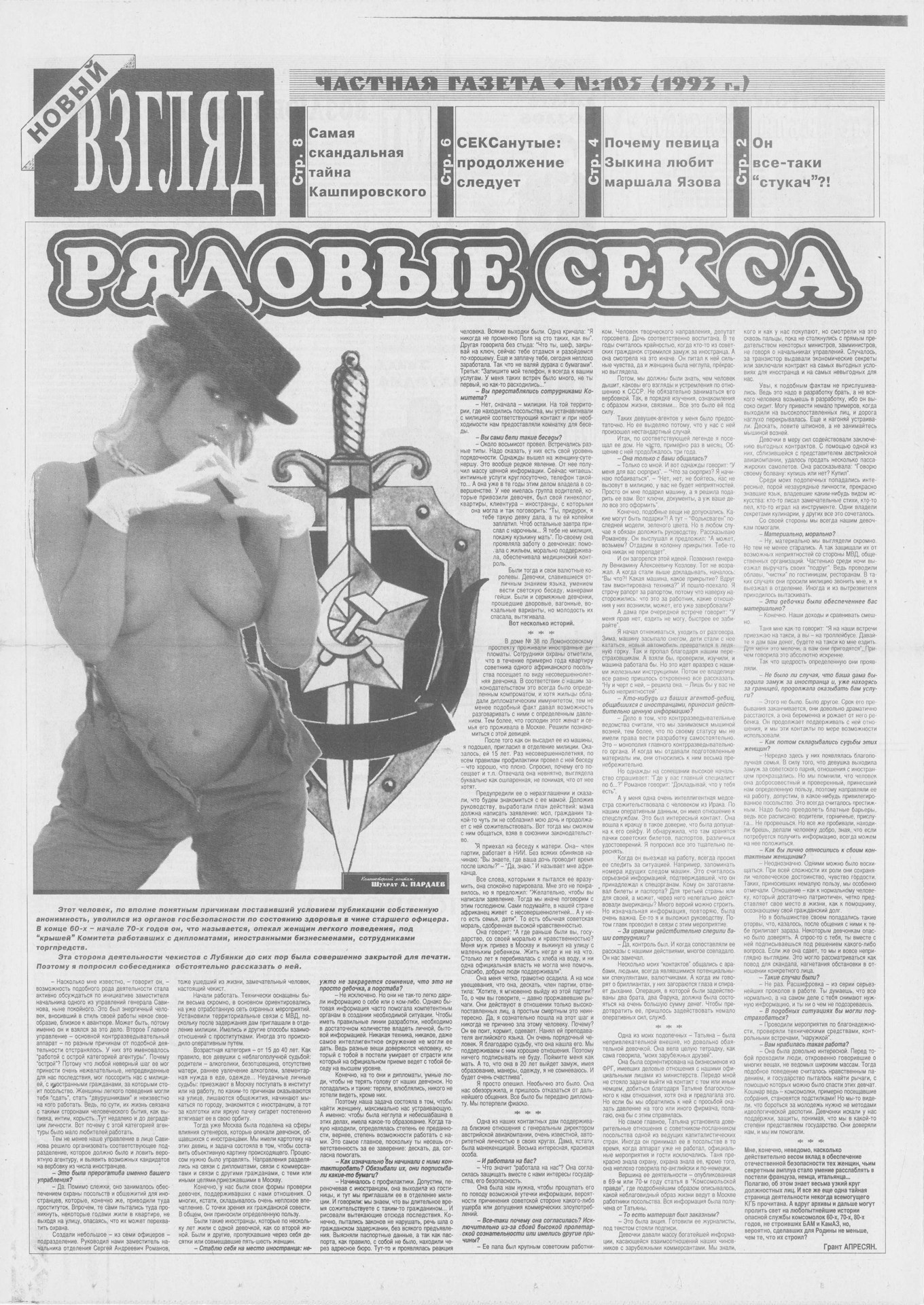
The edition on prostitutes working for the KGB, in the newspaper Novy Vzglyad (1993)

It was founded in early 1992 by VID (originally created as a voice for the TV show with the same name). Kirsan Ilyumzhinov bought the newspaper and merged it with another journal. It is owned by him and former TV host (of Vzglyad show) Yevgeny Dodolev.

Contributors: Eduard Limonov, Valeriya Novodvorskaya, Mogutin.

"Most notably, Novyi vzgliad became closely associated with new forms of political irony and was widely known for the fierce debates that took place on its pages—as well as for the few public trials that some of these debates caused".

Once a weekly, the Novy Vzglyad is now published 45 times per year, seven issues covering two-week spans.

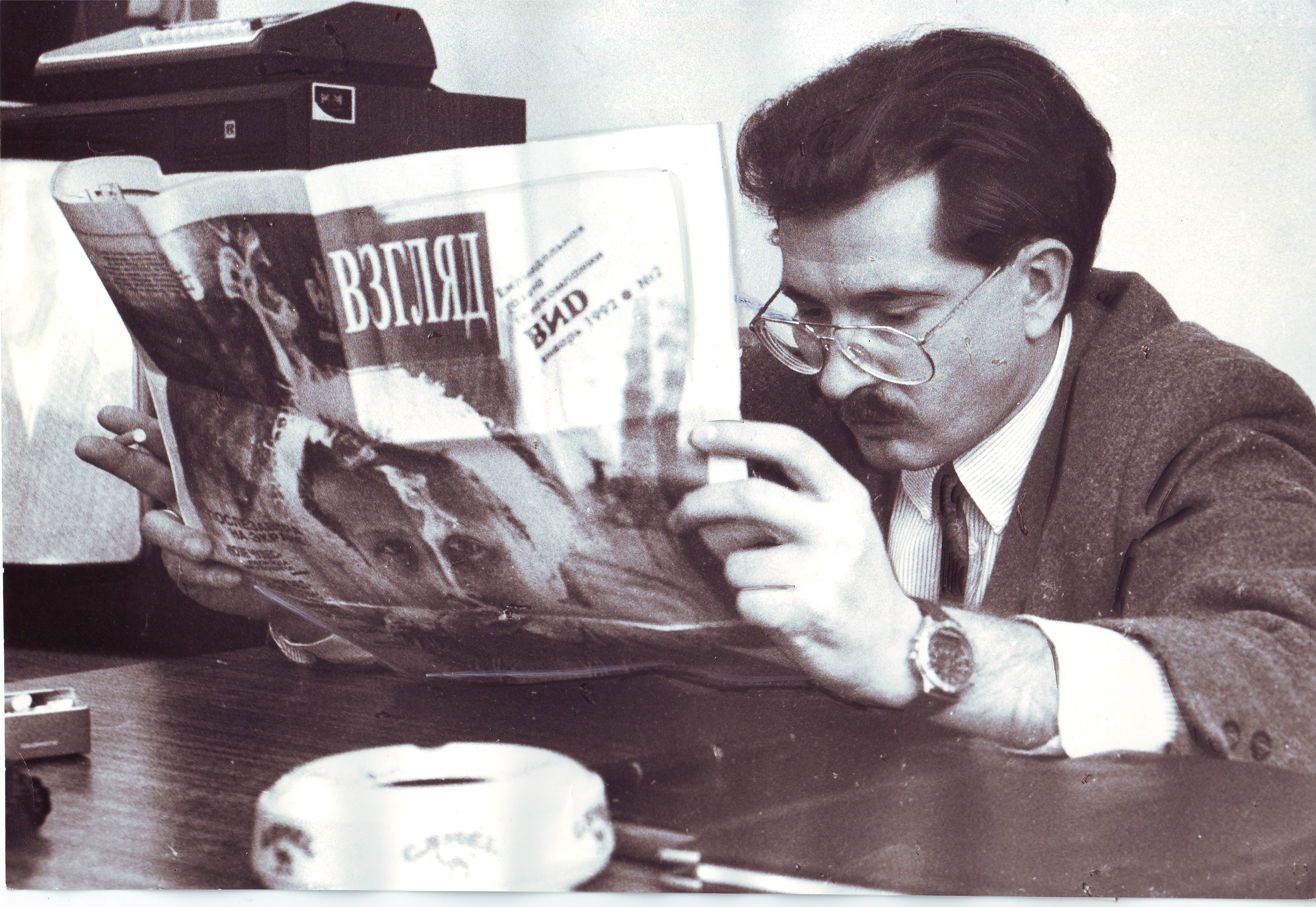
Vlad Listyev reading Novy Vzglyad

=== Publishing house ===
In 1995 the weekly newspaper grown into publishing house (publishing company). During 1995–1999 Novy Vzglyad Publishing House published nine magazines and periodicals (print and online) in Russia and CIS countries. It ended its four-year print run for magazines, due to economic difficulties of 1998 Russian financial crisis.

Its headquarters and printing plant are located in Moskovskaya Pravda building (Moscow). Since 2000 NVPH's portfolio includes only three newspaper including Muzykaljnaya Pravda weekly.
