= Marina Lesko =

Russian journalist, author and cultural commentator

- Марина Леско
- Born: (Soviet Union) Moscow, USSR
- Other name: M. Lesko
- Occupation: Journalist
- Website: http://newlookmedia.ru

Marina Lesko (Russian: Марина Леско), also known as M. Lesko is a Russian journalist, author, and cultural commentator.

== Career ==
Lesko started her career at the Novy Vzglyad in 1992. She later left and started working at the Travel + Leisure (Russian Edition). She ran that magazine for a while. In 2006, Lesko became head editor of the Moulin Rouge monthly, a position that she retained until 2009, when she became VP of Novy Vzglyad.

She is a regular contributor to Moskovskaya Pravda. Before joining Moulin Rouge, Lesko wrote Kompanja column. And before accepting her role as a columnist, Lesko was a television critic, and also served as a features writer.

She is best known for her participation in the Eurasian Media Forum debate segments, regarding so called media-glamorization.

=== Positions ===
Organization	Position	Years
Novy Vzglyad Publishing House	Managing Editor	1992–2004
Travel + Leisure (Russian Edition)	Editor in Chief	2005–2006
Kompania Weekly	Columnist	2005–2009
Moulin Rouge magazine	Head Editor	2006–2008
Novy Vzglyad Publishing House	Vice President	From 2009

== Columns by Lesko in Russian ==
- About Russian TV in Profil/Der Spiegel
- Who is who?
- Regarding SL (Second Life)
- Women Fortune
- Women & Politics
- Money
- Russian Writers
- What is wife?

== See also ==
- Yevgenia Albats
- Vladislav Listyev
- Yevgeny Dodolev
- Artyom Borovik
- Sergey Dorenko
- Alexander Nevzorov
- Moskovskaya Komsomolka
- Moskovskaya Pravda
