= Valeriya Novodvorskaya =

Soviet dissident (1950–2014)

- Валерия Новодворская
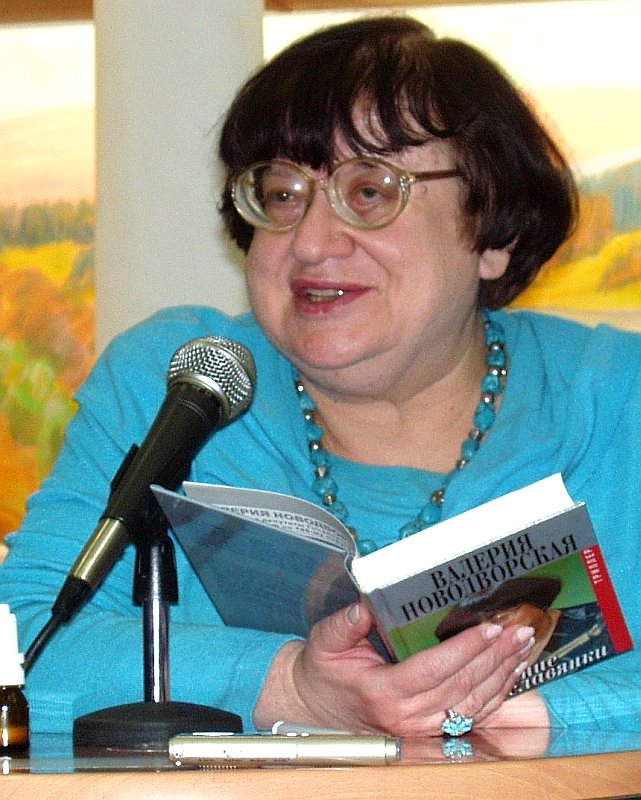
- Novodvorskaya in 2009

Chairman of the Democratic Union
- In office 8 May 1988 – 12 July 2014
- Preceded by: Office established
- Succeeded by: Office abolished

Personal details
- Born: Valeriya Ilyinichna Novodvorskaya; 17 May 1950 Baranavichy, Byelorussian SSR, Soviet Union
- Died: 12 July 2014 (aged 64) Moscow, Russia
- Cause of death: Toxic shock syndrome
- Resting place: Donskoye Cemetery
- Citizenship: Russian
- Party: Democratic Union
- Education: Moscow Oblast State University
- Occupation: Journalist

Valeriya Ilyinichna Novodvorskaya (Russian: Вале́рия Ильи́нична Новодво́рская; 17 May 1950 – 12 July 2014) was a Russian and Soviet dissident, writer and liberal politician. She was the founder and the chairwoman of the Democratic Union party and a member of the editorial board of The New Times.

== Biography ==
Novodvorskaya was born in 1950 in Baranavichy, Byelorussian SSR to a Jewish engineer, Ilya Borisovich (Boruchovich) Burshtyn, and a pediatrician, Nina Feodorovna Novodvorskaya, who came from a noble Russian family. Her parents divorced in 1967; Ilya Borisovich later emigrated to North America.

Novodvorskaya was active in the Soviet dissident movement since her youth, and first imprisoned by the Soviet authorities in 1969, when she was 19, for distributing leaflets that criticized the Soviet invasion of Czechoslovakia. The leaflets included her poetry about the Soviet Communist Party:

...
Thank you Party
For all the falsehood and lies,
For all the denunciations and informers,
For the shots in Prague’s square,
For all the lies you’ve yet to tell.

For the paradise of factories and of flats,
All built on crimes in the torture
Chambers of yesterday and today
And for our broken and black world.

Thank you Party
For our bitterness and despair,
For our shameful silence,
Thank you Party.
...

She was arrested and imprisoned at a Soviet psychiatric hospital and, like many other Soviet dissidents, diagnosed with "sluggish schizophrenia". In the early 1990s, psychiatrists of the Independent Psychiatric Association of Russia proved that the claim of her mental illness was false. She described her experience in her book Beyond Despair.

Based on the materials of the case, the Moscow prosecutor's office of the USSR compiled the following certificate (revealed only in 1999):

Novodvorskaya V. I. (born in 1950, Jew, member of the Komsomol, secondary education, student at the Torez Institute of Foreign Languages, Moscow) […] In December 1969, in the Kremlin Hall of Performances, she scattered a large number of anti-Soviet leaflets in the stalls. March 16, 1970

Novodvorskaya stood as a Democratic Union candidate in the 1993 Russian legislative election in a single-mandate district as part of the Russia's Choice bloc, and she also contested the 1995 Russian legislative election on the list of the Party of Economic Freedom. She was not elected in either election, and never held public office.

In 2009, Novodvorskaya published an autobiographical book, Farewell of Slavianka.

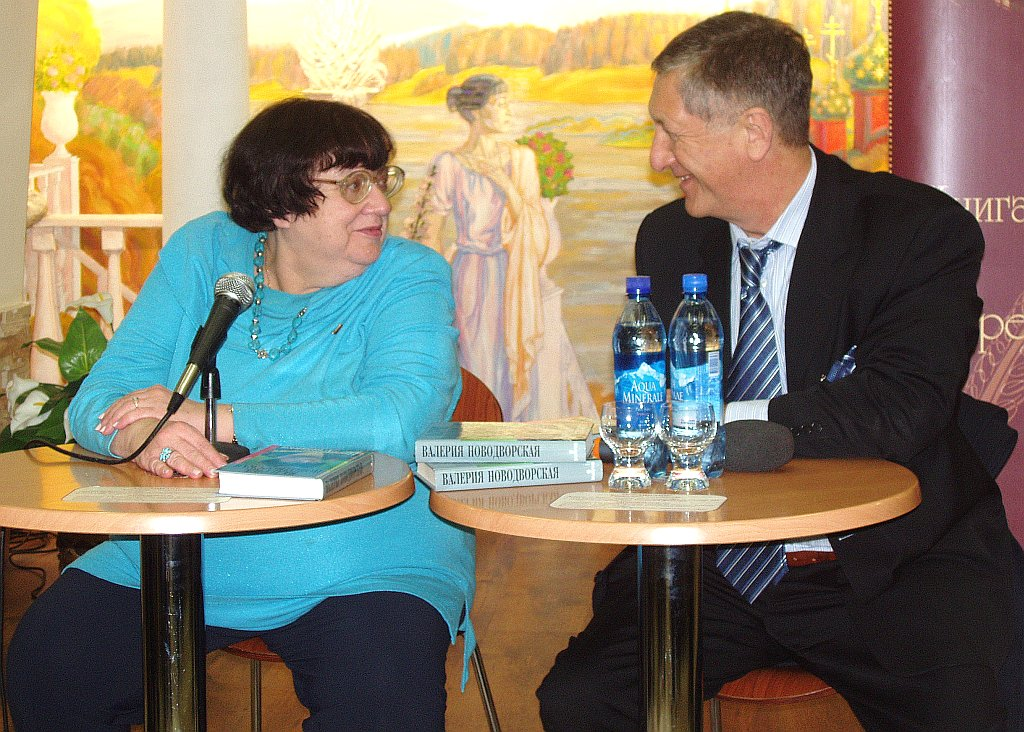
Novodvorskaya with Konstantin Borovoi on presentation of her book, Farewell of Slavyanka, 22 January 2009

== Views ==
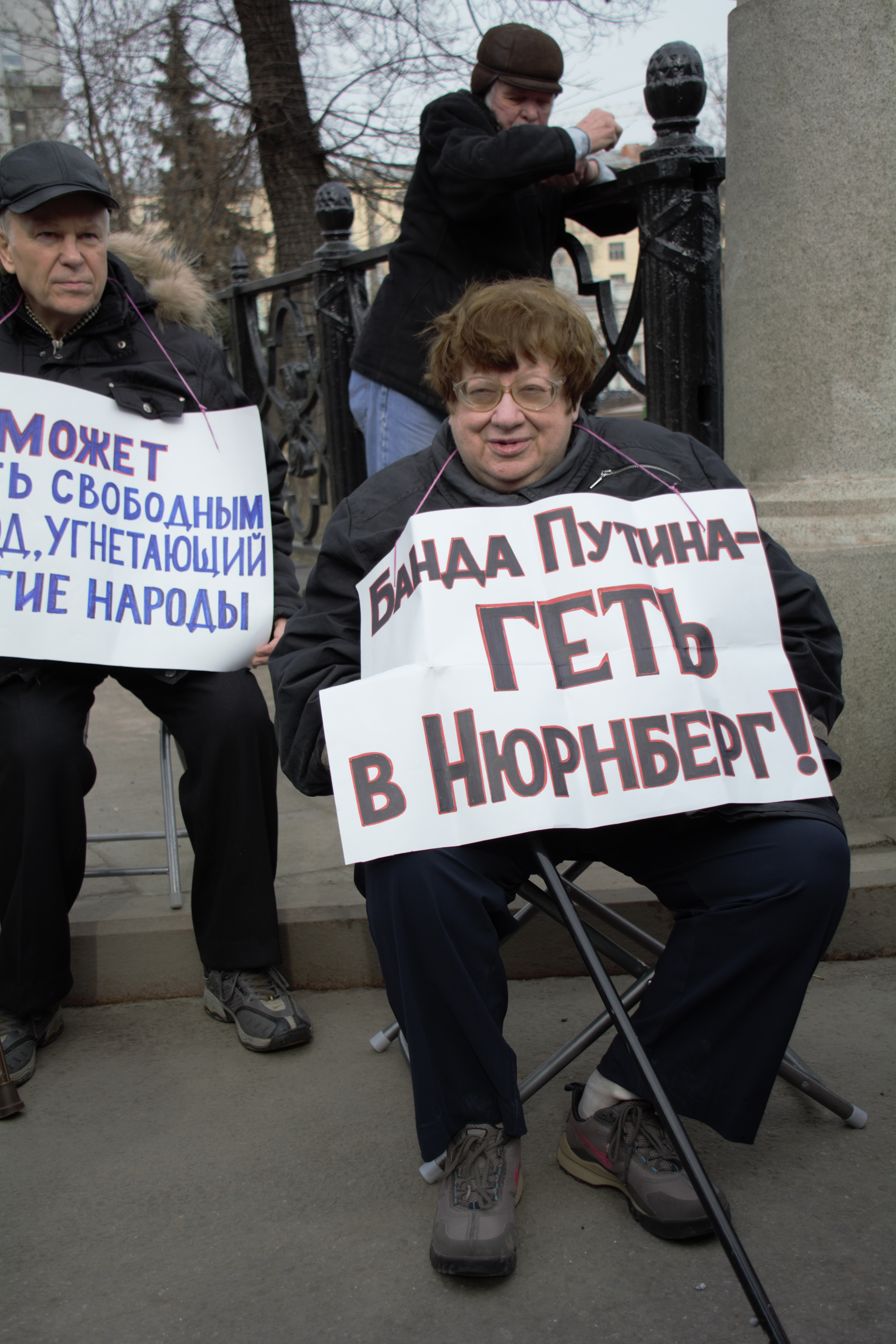
Novodvorskaya with a poster telling "Putin's gang, off to Nuremberg!" Moscow, 2014

Novodvorskaya self-identified primarily as a liberal politician and was described by her colleagues as "a critic of Russian realities in the best traditions of Pyotr Chaadayev, Vissarion Belinsky and Alexander Herzen".

In the 1990s, she was strongly critical of the reintroduction of Soviet propaganda in Russia and the First Chechen War. Her consistent criticism of Russia's past and present, of political and social life, as well as her extravagant lifestyle granted her titles such as "the eternal dissident" and "an idealist at the edge of madness".

On 27 January 1995, the Office of the Prosecutor-General launched the Novodvorskaya Case in reaction to her interview given to Estonian journalists on 6 April 1994 where she stated that she "cannot imagine how can anyone love a Russian for his laziness, for his lying, for his poverty, for his spinelessness, for his slavery", as well as several publications in Novy Vzglyad and other periodicals. According to the prosecution, she denigrated rights of Russians in Estonia and claimed that "manic depression" was the major trait of Russian people which defined all their national history.

All materials were checked for "propaganda of civil war", "of inferiority of people based on their ethnicity" and "incitement to hatred". Henri Reznik who defended her in court insisted that Novodvorkaya had only expressed her opinion "similarly to Pyotr Chaadayev, Nikolai Gogol, Alexander Pushkin and Vladimir Lenin". The case lasted for two years and was closed in June 1997 for the "lack of crime". However Novy Vzglyad stopped publishing her articles, and its founder Yevgeny Dodolev later dedicated a critical book to Novodvorskaya and her case.

Aleksandr Dugin, Igor Shafarevich, Sergey Kara-Murza, Yevgeny Dodolev, Vladimir Bushin and a few others accused Novodvorskaya of expressing anti-Russian views and condemning Russian history while idealizing Western civilization and the United States.

Novodvorskaya strongly opposed the Second Chechen War and Vladimir Putin's domestic and foreign policies.

Наша страна находится под благостным управлением человека, который ставит перед собой цель следовать особому российскому пути – вне норм и категорий мировой цивилизации.

У нас сейчас военная диктатура, прикрытая неработающей псевдодемократией. Не может сохраниться политическая свобода в стране, которая голосует за военного преступника.

Вертухай никогда не построит правовое государство. Вертухай сможет построить только зону.
Our country is under the benevolent rule of the person who sets the goal to follow a specific Russian path – outside the norms and categories of world civilization.

We now have a military dictatorship, covered by a non-working pseudo-democracy. Political freedom cannot be preserved in a country that votes for a war criminal.

A turnkey will never build a law-governed state. A turnkey can build a prison only.

— Valeriya Novodvorskaya, 2000.

According to Novodvorskaya, it was Russian governmental policies in Chechnya that turned Shamil Basayev into a terrorist. In response, Alexei Venediktov, the editor-in-chief of the liberal radio station Echo of Moscow, banned her from appearing on their programs.

Novodvorskaya accused the Russian government of murdering Polish president Lech Kaczyński in a plane crash on 10 April 2010 in Smolensk Oblast.

She supported Georgia in the Russo-Georgian War and Ukraine in the Russo-Ukrainian War.

Вы хотя бы знаете, кто такой Путин? Это чудовище. Это сталинист. Это порождение мрака. Что ему нужно? Ему нужно, чтобы никто нормально не жил. Ему империя нужна. Империя зла, потому что империй добра не бывает.
Do you even know who Putin is? He is a monster. He is a Stalinist. He is a creature of darkness. What does he need? He needs that no one live normally. He needs an empire. Evil empire, because there are no empires of good.

— Valeriya Novodvorskaya's address to the Donbas militants, 18 June 2014.

== Personal life ==
Throughout her life, Novodvorskaya lived in a flat with her mother Nina Fyodorovna (Нина Федоровна Новодворская, 1928–2017), a pediatrician, and cat Stasik. In the summers, they rented a dacha in Kratovo. She was fond of swimming, science fiction, theater and cats.

In 1990, Novodvorskaya was baptized by the non-canonical Ukrainian Autocephalous Orthodox Church Reunited. She belonged to the church until her death while remaining highly critical of the KGB-controlled Russian Orthodox Church. According to her priest Yakov Krotov, "she was more of a Christian than I ever was."

== Death ==
On 12 July 2014, Novodvorskaya died of toxic shock syndrome, which arose from a phlegmon of the left foot.

On the day of her memorial service, Mikhail Gorbachev sent a telegram to be read aloud, in which he described Novodvorskaya: "She was a unique personality in the democratic movement. Exceptionally fearless, resolute, and unwavering in defending her views, Valeria Ilyinichna consistently drew fire upon herself. The indomitable spirit of an idealistic fighter lived within her."

== Awards ==
Novodvorskaya received the Galina Starovoitova Award "for contribution to the defense of human rights and strengthening democracy in Russia". She said at the ceremony that "we are not in opposition to, but in confrontation with, the present regime".

She was awarded the Knight's Cross of the Order of the Lithuanian Grand Duke Gediminas in 2008.

== Quotes ==
Когда хочешь сохранить свободу, нельзя думать о том, чтобы сохранить жизнь, потому что, во-первых, это пошло и тривиально, во-вторых, это не достойная человека цель; так что здесь даже нет никакого героизма, это просто здоровый выбор, нормальный анализ ситуации.
When you want to preserve freedom, you cannot think about saving your own life, because, firstly, it is vulgar and trivial, secondly, it isn’t goal worthy of a human; thus, there is no heroism, it is just a healthy choice, a normal analysis of the situation.

— Valeriya Novodvorskaya

== Bibliography ==
Novodvorskaya published several books that are supplemented with the publications from Novy Vzglyad newspaper: (ISBN 978-5-8159-0893-2)

- Beyond Despair (Novosti, 1993) (in Russian)
- Карфаген обязан быть разрушен (The Carthage Must Be Destroyed) (in Russian)
- Валерия Новодворская. Над пропастью во лжи (The Catcher in the Lie) (both titles are puns on The Catcher in the Rye) (in Russian)
- Валерия Новодворская. Прощание славянки (Farewell of Slav) (Захаров, 2009 г) (in Russian)
- Валерия Новодворская. Поэты и цари (Poets and Kings) (Аct, Аct Москва, Харвест, 2009 г) (in Russian)

== Documentary film ==
On 13 April 2023, the documentary film The White Overcoat dedicated to Valeriya Novodvorskaya was released.
