= Olga Rodionova =

Croatian-Russian model, actress and TV presenter (born 1974)

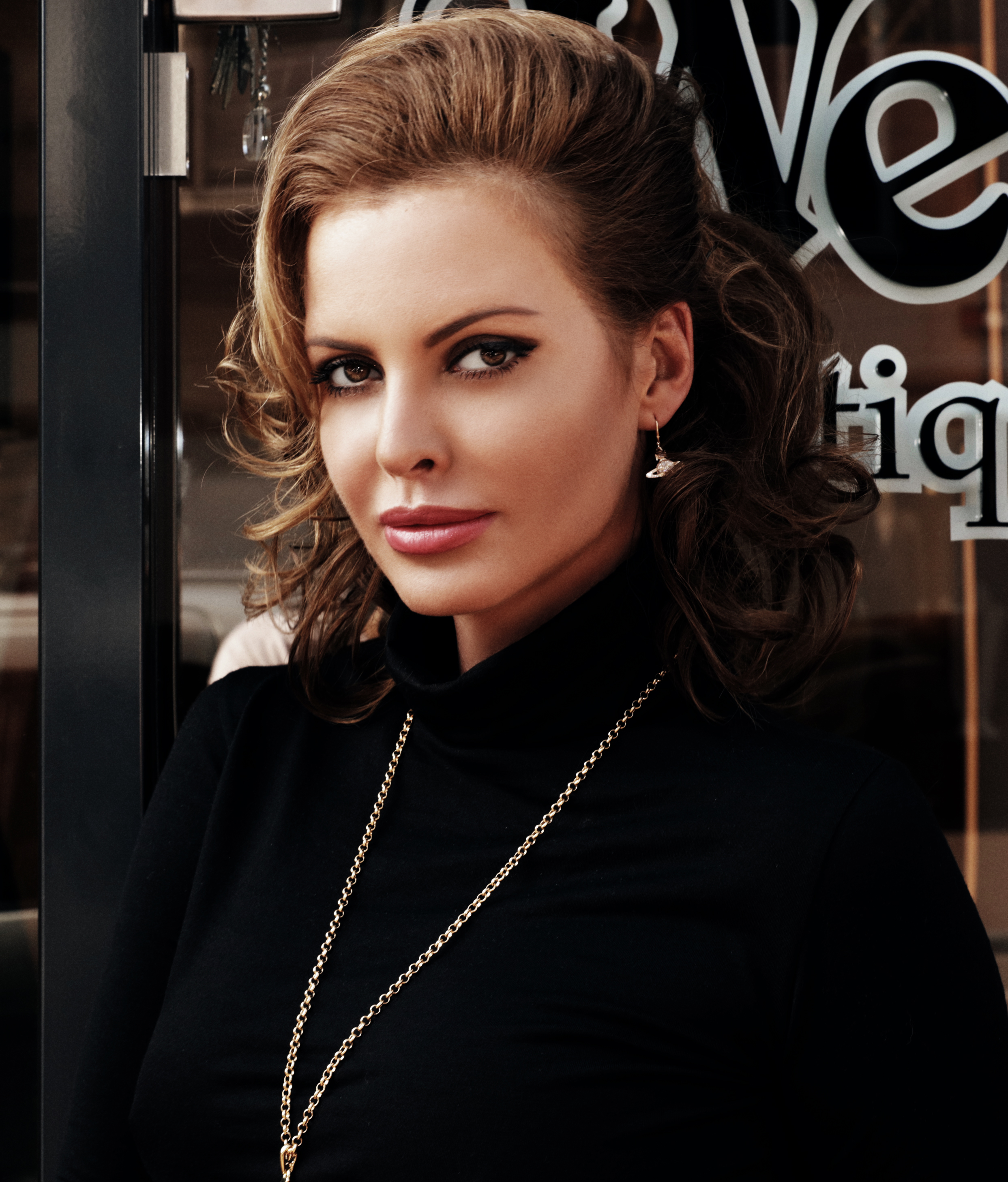
- Born: 25 June 1974 (age 52)
- Occupations: Model, actress, TV presenter
- Height: 1.78 m (5 ft 10 in)
- Children: 1

Olga Rodionova (born 25 June 1974) is a Croatian-Russian model, actress and TV presenter.

== Career ==
As a model, Rodionova has worked with many fashion photographers in the world, including Helmut Newton, David LaChapelle, Peter Lindbergh, Terry Richardson, Sante D'Orazio, Bettina Rheims, Ellen von Unwerth, John Rankin, Jean-Daniel Lorieux, Marino Parisotto, Guido Argentini and has graced the covers and pages of Playboy (Russia 2001, 2003, 2006, 2013; Poland 2004; Germany 2008; Greece 2009; Croatia 2003, 2011; Italy 2012,2013; Ukraine 2013; Argentina 2008, 2012- five covers, four times playmate), Vogue (France, Italy, Germany), Grazia (France), Photo (France), FHM, L'Officiel (France, Russia), W (USA), Numéro (France), Panorama (Italy), GQ (Germany, Brazil), Le Monde (France), Guardian (UK), and El Mundo (Spain).

Benedikt Taschen, the publisher of Taschen (Taschen Gmbh), produced the provocative art album The Book of Olga (2008) by Bettina Rheims, which contains nude photos of Rodionova and attracted unprecedented attention from both art and political media worldwide.

The photos of The Book of Olga were part of Bettina Rheims' exhibitions at the Forma in Milan (2008), and the European House of Photography (Maison Européenne de la Photographie) in Paris (2016).

In 2011, another photo album called The Story of Olga was produced by Ellen von Unwerth with Rodionova as the main character. This album was published by Taschen in 2012. The exhibition at the CWC Gallery in Berlin (2012), consisting of over 30 works, showed an exclusive selection of the 2011-series of this book. The images from this book were presented at Ellen for Unwert exhibition "30 years of Photography" at Fotografiska Museet, Stockholm, 2018. Rodionova resided in Amsterdam, the Netherlands in 2013–2019. She owned the Vivienne Westwood boutique that was located in the cultural heart of the city: P.C. Hooftstraat 116. She moved to Dubai, United Arab Emirates in 2019. She became the editor-in-chief of Hello! magazine in April 2021. It is the Russian local edition of ¡Hola!, the Spanish weekly magazine.

== Social activism ==
Rodionova is known for her promotion of rights and social freedoms in Russia. She was the first social personality in Russia to fight against libel and violation of privacy in the Russian courts. She hosts/takes part in charity actions with Jude Law, Ashton Kutcher, Demi Moore, Michelle Rodriguez, Owen Wilson etc. in her home country.

== Selected filmography ==
Year	Film	Role	Notes
2002	Society Columns	Inna Bragina	TV film
2002	The Fifth Angel	Tanya Budraitis	TV serial
2003	Totalisator	Elisabeth	
2004	Love Adventures	Madelaine/Annet	TV serial
2006	Elevator	Anastasia	
2007	Treasure Raidersi	Masha	
2007	Agony of Fear	Inga	TV film
2007	Paradox	Olga	
2009	Mission: Prophet	Helena	
2010	Chemist	Aliona	TV serial
2014	Black Rose	Natalya	
