= Sergey Dorenko =

Russian journalist (1959–2019)

- Сергей Доренко
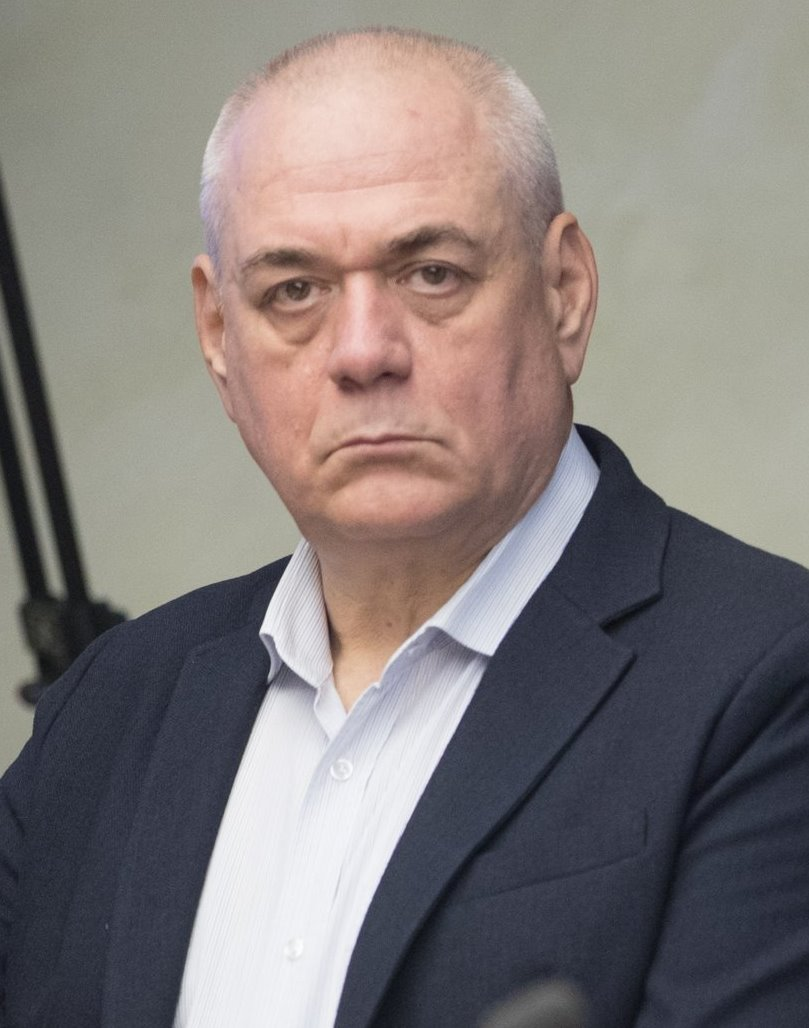
- Dorenko in 2017
- Born: Sergey Leonidovich Dorenko; 18 October 1959; Kerch, Ukrainian SSR, Soviet Union
- Died: 9 May 2019 (aged 59); Moscow, Russia
- Occupations: Journalist, news presenter, opinion journalism

Sergey Leonidovich Dorenko (Russian: Сергей Леонидович Доренко; 18 October 1959 – 9 May 2019) was a Russian TV and radio journalist, known for hosting a weekly news commentary program in 1999–2000.

== Biography ==
=== 1980s ===
In 1982, Dorenko graduated from People's Friendship University of Russia in Moscow, and served as a Portuguese-Russian translator in Angola. In June 1984, he was drafted to the military, but was discharged in January 1985 due to health problems.

In April 1985, Dorenko became an employee of Gosteleradio (State Television and Radio Broadcasting Company, the only TV and radio broadcaster in the Soviet Union).

=== 1990s ===
Between 1996 and 1999, he hosted Vremya, a news commentary program on ORT. In September 1999, Dorenko hosted the weekly Sergey Dorenko Show on Saturdays at 9pm, and in November 1999 became a Deputy Director General of ORT. He was critical of the Mayor of Moscow, Yuriy Luzhkov, Yevgeny Primakov and their party Fatherland-All Russia, who were major opponents of Vladimir Putin and the pro-Putin party Unity during the 1999 State Duma electoral campaign. In his program, collages of Luzhkov in women's dress were shown. After that, Dorenko was widely nicknamed "TV Hitman" in the media.

From September 1999 to September 2000, Dorenko hosted the Author's Program of Sergey Dorenko. Before the 1999 Duma elections, the program worked against the leaders of the Fatherland - All Russia bloc, Yury Luzhkov, then mayor of Moscow, and Yevgeny Primakov. It achieved its goal when the bloc lost the elections to the newly created United Russia. Dorenko's sharp criticism of Luzhkov drew much attention, even leading to the temporary closure of the program. On his program, Dorenko showed a video filmed from a helicopter of Luzhkov's real estate in the Moscow Oblast, revealed Luzhkov's financial secrets, and circulated a photograph of Luzhkov in the company of the crime boss Yaponchik). Dorenko also accused Luzhkov of involvement in the murder of American businessman Paul Tatum in 1996. Dorenko's phrase "you would think: what does Luzhkov have to do with this?", which accompanied his accusations, became widely known. The 24 October 1999 broadcast of the program also became memorable: it revealed some details about the state of Yevgeny Primakov's health, as a result of which Primakov dropped out of the race for the presidency of the Russian Federation, and Dorenko received the nickname "telekiller" from his colleagues.

=== 2000s ===
On 2 September 2000, Dorenko's program criticized the government's handling of the sinking of the Kursk submarine based on materials from a business trip to the Vidyayevo garrison. In particular, the program criticized President Vladimir Putin. Soon afterward, his program was canceled in a scandal, and Dorenko alleged that this resulted from pressure from the Kremlin.

According to BBC News, Dorenko told the Echo of Moscow radio at the time that

on 29 August the president proposed that I join his team, as he put it, and stay at Channel 1 to be his favourite and best-loved journalist.
I said to him: I am very sorry, I can and very much would like to work at Channel 1 but as part of the team of the viewers. [President Putin] just said in reply: I see that you have not yet made up your mind. I said: On the contrary, I have made up my mind, in favour of the viewers.

The director of the ORT network, Konstantin Ernst, insisted that contrary to Dorenko's allegations, the government had not been involved in the change and that he made the decision to cancel the show because Dorenko had refused to stop discussing the government's plan to nationalize media magnate Boris Berezovsky's 49% stake in the network. Ernst noted,

The founders of the company decide the fate of the private stake. In the current situation, I asked the presenter S. Dorenko in today's episode of his author's program to refrain from commenting on the conflict between public and private shareholders of Public Russian Television, since the emotional intensity of the situation poses a threat to the normal work of ORT.

Following this incident, Dorenko became a vocal critic of Vladimir Putin's rule and did not work for Russian television again. Instead, he hosted radio programs for Echo of Moscow.

On 7 September 2000, Boris Berezovsky transferred his controllable stake in ORT to journalists and representatives of the creative intelligentsia, including Dorenko. Despite the program's closure, until 31 January 2001, Dorenko was listed as deputy general director of ORT until he was fired due to the "expiration of the contract."

In September 2001, Dorenko tried to resume his program on Channel Three (OJSC TRVK Moskovia) instead of ORT. A distinctive feature of the program in the new format was the dialogue between Dorenko and the townspeople who gathered in one of the city squares at a free microphone (in live mode). The program ran for only two months and was closed in November.

In 2001, Dorenko was accused in a criminal case of hooliganism: Dorenko, on a motorcycle, drove into a captain of the first rank from the General Staff of the Russian Navy, Valery Nikitin, who happened to be in Dorenko's path, accompanied by two police officers. Dorenko stated that Nikitin kicked the motorcycle. Despite the "minor harm" inflicted on Nikitin, Dorenko was accused first of attempted murder and then of "hooliganism with a weapon." Dorenko faced 4 to 8 years in prison. However, in his own words, thanks to the intercession of the then-official of the Presidential Administration, Igor Sechin, he received four years of probation.

On 30 September 2003, in Stavropol Krai, Dorenko joined the Communist Party of the Russian Federation.

In 2004, in Kyiv, Dorenko negotiated with the management of the Ukrainian television channel NTN about cooperation. In December 2004, during the Orange Revolution, Dorenko spoke on Maidan Nezalezhnosti in front of protesters criticizing Vladimir Putin.

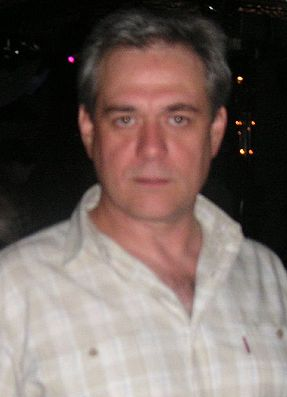
Dorenko in 2005

From 2004 to 2008, Dorenko collaborated with the Echo of Moscow radio station. According to the charter of the Echo of Moscow editorial office, staff members of the radio station cannot be members of political parties. Therefore, Dorenko, as a member of the Communist Party of the Russian Federation, was de jure considered not an employee but a guest, a participant in such programs as "Minority Opinion" and "Morning Spread".

In 2005, Dorenko published 2008, a work of political fiction about an upcoming revolution in Russia, featuring President Vladimir Putin and Igor Sechin, Dorenko's close ally.

On 23 May 2007, Dorenko provided the Associated Press and The Wall Street Journal with the full videotape of an interview he recorded in April 1998 with Alexander Litvinenko and fellow FSB employees, where the agents appeared to confess that their bosses had ordered them to kill, kidnap or frame prominent Russian politicians and businesspeople, and thus made it publicly available in full for the first time. Only some excerpts of the video had been shown in 1998.

From 2008 to 2013, he was editor-in-chief of the Russian News Service radio station.

=== 2010s ===
In March 2012, Dorenko announced his resignation from the Communist Party of the Russian Federation.

Since 2014, Dorenko was the founder and chief editor of the Govorit Moskva radio station.

=== Health issues and death ===
On 9 May 2019, Dorenko was riding his Triumph Bonneville motorcycle in the center of Moscow when he began veering into oncoming traffic, reportedly after suffering a cardiac event. Dorenko avoided collision with other vehicles, but struck the concrete guard rail on the opposite side of the highway. Dorenko was hospitalized, with doctors attempting to revive him for over an hour. Having never regained consciousness he was pronounced dead. Subsequent reports identified aortic rupture as the cause of Dorenko's death. It was reported that Dorenko had been aware of his diagnosis since 2016 and his untimely death could have been avoided with proper treatment and medical care.

== See also ==
- Artyom Borovik
- Evgeny Dodolev
- Marina Lesko
- Vladislav Listyev
- Alexander Nevzorov
