= Yakov Krotov =

Russian essayist and Orthodox priest

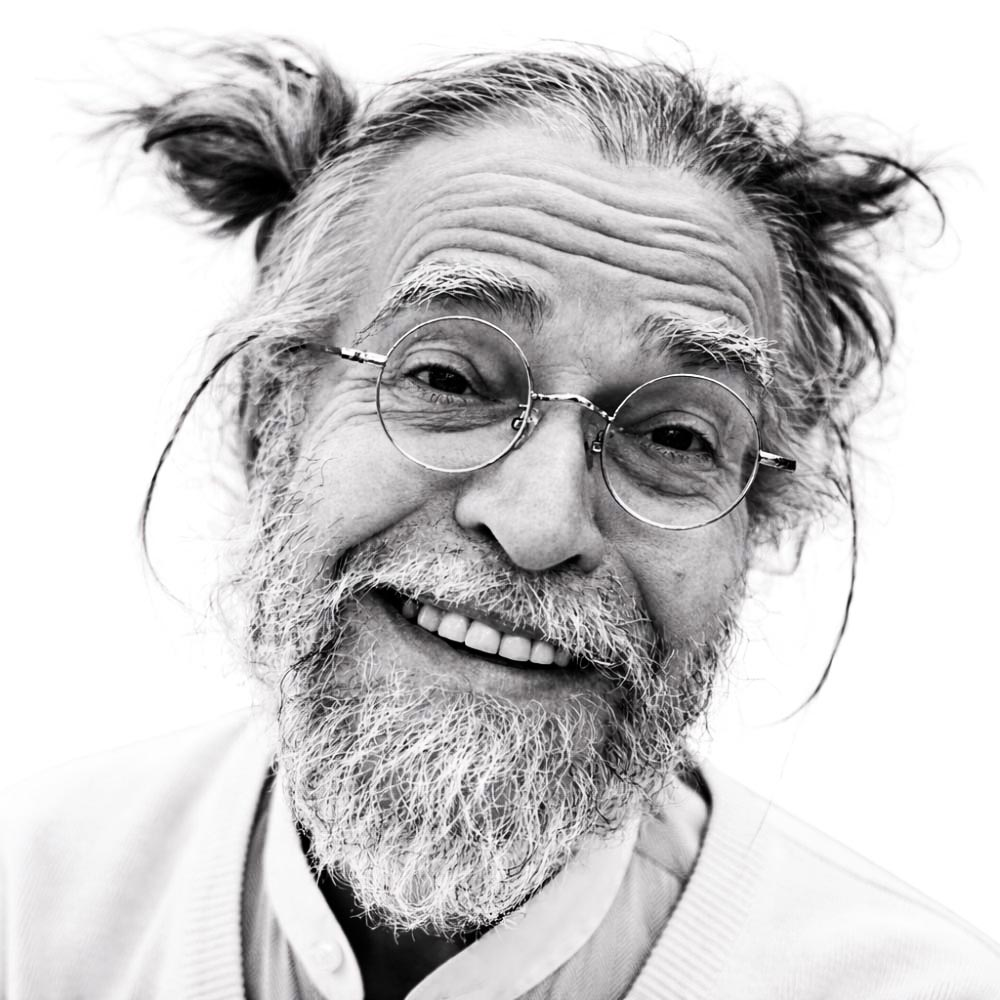
Picture of Yakov Krotov taken on 30 December 2025

Yakov Gavrilovich Krotov (Russian: Яков Гаврилович Кротов; born 31 May 1957) is a Russian author and historian.

From 1977 to 1989, he worked as a librarian and archivist. Since 1990 he has been a freelance author. He writes about history, Christianity, promotes values of tolerance, religious liberty and peace-making. He published five books in Russian.

In 1994, he lectured in the United States on the Russian Orthodoxy as a Bradley Visiting Scholar.

As of 2008, Krotov was the host of a Radio Free Europe/Radio Liberty Russian Service program on religion.

From 6 to 8 October 2013, Yakov Krotov took part in the Twentieth Annual International Law and Religion Symposium. The symposium was organised by Brigham Young University in Provo, and was devoted to the theme “Religion and Human Rights.”

He is married and has two sons.

== Publications ==
- Sermon by priest Yakov Krotov
- Fr. Aleksandr Men: Christian Priest and Apologist East-West Church Ministry Report, Vol. 7, No. 3, Summer 1999, Covering the Former Soviet Union and East Central Europe
