= Yevgeny Dodolev =

Russian journalist

- Евгений Додолев
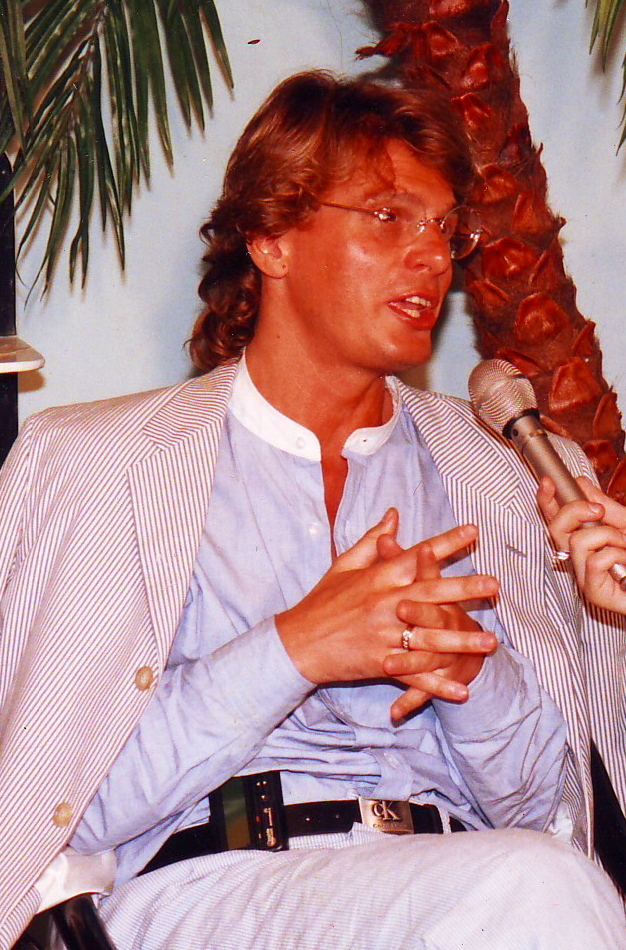
- Dodolev in 1997
- Born: Yevgeniy Yuriyevich Dodolyev; 11 June 1957 (age 69); Moscow, Soviet Union
- Education: Moscow State Pedagogical University
- Occupations: Journalist, publisher
- Title: President
- Website: http://newlookmedia.ru

Evgeny Yuriyevich Dodolev (also spelled "Yevgeniy" or "Eugueni"; Russian: Евгений Юрьевич Додолев; born 11 June 1957) is a well-known Russian journalist, publisher, and a host of the state-owned Russian television channel Russia-1. The author of the first article on prostitution in the Soviet Union. Dodolev twice received the title of "Best Journalist of the USSR" from the Union of Journalists of the USSR (1986 and 1988).

== Career ==
Interview by Igor Svinarenko (Medved monthly)

Story in Moskovskaya Pravda daily

Dodolev wrote articles about corruption in the Kremlin in popular Soviet newspapers.

Evgeny worked in the monthly magazine Sovershenno Sekretno (Top Secret, "the first fully independent, privately owned periodical in Soviet Russia since 1917") which was founded by Yulian Semyonov.

Joanna Stingray wrote about this journalist in her book "Red Wave: An American in the Soviet Music Underground": «Evgeny Dodolev was another key figure. He wasn’t a musician, but as a journalist covering the underground scene, he had access to people and stories I couldn’t reach on my own. He introduced me to several bands and helped me understand the dynamics within the Leningrad Rock Club better than I ever could from the outside».

Served as host of the Vzgliad.

Evgeny was publisher of FHM (Russian edition).

He is an owner and publisher of newspaper Novy Vzglyad.

He is the president of the Novy Vzglyad Publishing House and co-owns a few newspapers. The Vice President is Marina Lesko. Co-owner of the Publishing House is Kirsan Ilyumzhinov.

Organization	Position	Years
Moskovskij Komsomolets daily	Managing Editor	1986–1988
Soviet TV Channel One	Anchor of VID	1989–1991
Novy Vzglyad Publishing House	President	1992–2009
The New York Times Company	U.S. fellowship program	1993–1995
Moskovskaya Komsomolka	Publisher	1999–2001
Travel + Leisure (Russian Edition)	Publisher	2005–2006
Kompania Weekly	Editor in Chief	2005–2009
BusinessWeek (Russian Edition)	Publishing director	2006–2007
Der Spiegel / Profil weekly	Publishing director	2006–2009
Rodionov Publishing House	Chief executive officer	2006–2009
Moulin Rouge magazine	Publishing director	2006–2008
FHM (Russian Edition)	Publishing director	2007–2008

== Books ==
Dodolev published several books, including The Pyramid. The Soviet Mafia (LCCN: 91220622), about the Soviet corruption. He also helped his father Juri Dodolev and his uncle Mikhail Dodolev in writing fiction and historical novels, including The Congress of Vienna in the 19th and 20th centuries (ISBN 5201005365). He has written and published 28 books in total.

- Dodolev, Evgenii (February 1992). Les coulisses du Kremlin. Mercure de France. ISBN 978-2-7152-1749-2.
- Dodolev, Evgenii (February 1989). Processy : glasnost' i mafija; protivostojanie (The processes. Glasnost & mafia). Molodaja Gvardija. ISBN 5-235-00980-0.
- Dodolev & Gdlian (February 1990). Mafiia Vremen Bezzakoniia (Mafia in Times of Lawlessness). Tip. izd-va TSK KP Armenii. ISBN 978-5-8079-0222-1.
- Dodolev, Evgenii (June 1992). Ikh Kreml (Their Kremlin) Includes interviews with Viktor Alksnis, Dmitrii Vasil'ev, Zhirinovsky, Oleg Kalugin, Albert Makashov, Nevzorov and Sazhi Ulamatova. Novyi vzgliad.

== Films ==
- Prostitutki (Inside Story goes undercover with the Soviet Police), BBC One 1990, Associate Producer.
- Miss Pressa, Soviet Channel One 1991, Author, Film Editor and Producer.
- If the People Will Lead (The Soviet Media During the Fall of Communism), NBC 1992, Associate Producer.

== See also ==
- Sergey Dorenko
- Moskovskaya Komsomolka
- Moskovskaya Pravda
