= Pro-Kremlin youth movement =

Pro-Kremlin youth movement may refer to these groups in Russia aligned with its government:

- Nashi (Russian youth movement), 2005–2019 pro-Putin organisation
- Walking Together, former pro-Putin youth movement
- Young Guard of United Russia, Youth wing of the United Russia party
