= Maksim Gulin =

Russian politician

- Максим Гулин
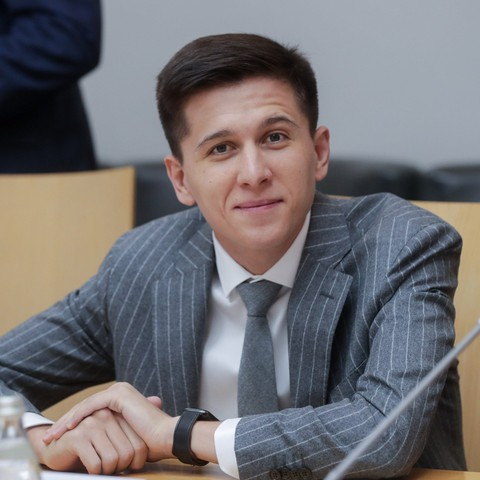

Chairman of the committee on economic policy of the Legislative Assembly of the Chelyabinsk Region
- Incumbent
- Assumed office 2 October 2025
- Preceded by: Evgeniy Ille

Deputy of the Legislative Assembly of the Chelyabinsk Region
- Incumbent
- Assumed office 14 September 2025
- Constituency: Unified electoral district

Advisor to the Chairman of the Russian Movement of Children and Youth
- In office 13 March 2023 – 14 August 2024
- Chairman of the Management Board: Grigory Gurov
- Succeeded by: Timur Safin

Deputy of the State Duma Russia
- In office 12 October 2021 – 13 March 2023
- Succeeded by: Anna Skroznikova
- Constituency: Chelyabinsk Oblast

Personal details
- Born: 16 May 1997 (age 29) Kopeysk, Chelyabinsk Oblast, Russia
- Party: New People (from 2021); Movement of the First (2023-2024)
- Education: Plekhanov Russian University of Economics

Maxim Alexeyevich Gulin (Russian: Максим Алексеевич Гулин; born 16 May 1997, Kopeysk, Chelyabinsk Oblast) is a Russian political. Chairman of the committee on economic policy of the Legislative Assembly of the Chelyabinsk Region from 2 October 2025 year.

Advisor to the Chairman of the Russian Movement of Children and Youth (2023–2024). karate Coach.

== Biography ==
Maxim Alekseevich Gulin was born on May 16, 1997 in Kopeysk, Chelyabinsk Oblast.

In 2019 and 2021, he graduated from the Russian University of Economics named after Plekhanov, Bachelor's and Master's degree programs at the Business Faculty.

He started his career as a junior manager at the Kapitany Charitable Foundation.

In 2021, he was appointed Director of the School of New Policy of the Regional Development Department of the Kapitany Charitable Foundation.

From February 2021 - Secretary of the Chelyabinsk regional branch of the New People political party.

From September 19, 2021 to March 13, 2023 – Deputy of the State Duma of Russia of the VIII convocation from the Chelyabinsk region, joined the New People faction in the lower house of the Federal Parliament.

Since October 12, 2021 to 13 march 2023 he has served as First Deputy Chairman of the State Duma Russia Committee on Education.

In March 2023, the State Duma adopted a resolution on the termination of Maxim Gulin's parliamentary powers on his personal application in connection with the transfer to another job. Gulin's mandate was transferred to Anna Skroznikova.

In March 2023, he became an advisor to Grigory Gurov, Chairman of the Board of the Russian Movement of Children and Youth.

From 2024 to the present, he has been Deputy Director General of the Kapitany Charitable Foundation for Educational Programs.

On September 14, 2025, he was elected a deputy of the Legislative Assembly of the Chelyabinsk Region from the New People party.

On October 2, 2025, he was elected Chairman of the Committee on Economic Policy of the Legislative Assembly of the Chelyabinsk Region.

By decision of the leadership of the Chelyabinsk regional parliament, he was included in the Legislative Assembly's Committee on Social Policy, the Legislative Assembly's Commission on Regulations and Parliamentary Ethics.
