= Lion Versus =

Russian youth social movement

Lion Versus Russian-language logo

Lion Versus or Lion Against (Russian: Лев Против, romanized: Lev Protiv; sometimes stylized Lion Vs.) is a Russian youth social movement opposed to smoking and drinking alcohol in public. Lion Versus volunteers hold video-recorded "raids" by visiting public areas such as train stations, parks and public squares, and asking people to stop smoking in designated non-smoking areas. If the smokers refuse, Lion Versus activists spray the smokers' hands with water from spray bottles in order to extinguish their cigarettes. In anti-public-intoxication raids, activists patrol public parks and squares, asking people who are drinking alcohol to pour the alcoholic beverages out in a nearby trash can or drain. If the people approached state the alcohol is not theirs, Lion Versus activists pour it out themselves. Police officers sometimes accompany Lion Versus activists on their raids, writing tickets to offenders. Videos of the raids are posted on Lion Versus's YouTube channel, publicly shaming smokers and drinkers while gathering online support as well as advertising revenue and donations. As of January 2019, the channel has over 1.5 million subscribers.

Lion Versus was founded in Moscow in 2014 by 18-year-old Mikhail "Lev" Lazutin with other former members of the Russian pedestrian-rights youth movement StopXam, which in turn was a project of former Nashi activists. The movement has spread from Moscow to other cities, including Bryansk, Belgorod, Pyatigorsk, and Sevastopol in occupied Crimea. In Kirov in 2016, Lion Versus members petitioned local prosecutors to ban Jehovah's Witnesses from the city, whom they called a "pseudo-religious group ... detrimental to society fundamentals of statehood in the Russian Federation." The SOVA Center has reported that Lion Versus's anti-alcohol raids are "more or less consistently popular". A 2018 study by the Berlin-based Centre for East European and International Studies found that 20 per cent of respondents recognized the Lev Protiv name, making it the second-most recognized Russian youth movement behind StopXam.

Lion Versus's English-language logo

In December 2018, Lion Versus activists held a raid in which they approached parents in public places who were drinking alcohol or smoking in the presence of their small children and offered to exchange the parents' alcoholic beverages or cigarettes for Christmas presents for their children. In January 2019, a man smoking in a railway station in Bryansk threatened to shoot Lion Versus activists after they approached him and asked him to stop smoking. A video of the interaction was posted to YouTube and circulated by local media, who reported that the man fled before police were called.

The movement has been criticized as being an "online vigilante movement", "hooliganism", overly confrontational or violent, and government-run or "pro-Kremlin ... part of a government-led effort to create an army of politically active youth." In a 2018 interview with Life in Russia, Lazutkin stated that Lion Versus only posts video of non-compliant public drinkers and smokers, and that Lion Versus's intended audience is not the public drinkers and smokers they confront, but rather their online audience of impressionable young viewers. A 2019 article in The Independent described Lion Versus as "skinhead vigilantes". The article alleged that the group received funding from the Russian government, which Lazutin denied.

== See also ==
- Direct action
- Nashi (youth movement)
- Nizhny Novgorod International Model UN
- Oborona
- PORA (Russian youth group)
- Provo (movement)
- Russian Social-Democratic Union of Youth
- StopXam (organization)
- Vanguard of Red Youth
- Walking Together
- Young Guard of United Russia
- Young Russia (youth movement)
