= Internet vigilantism =

Vigilante activities carried out through the Internet

Internet vigilantism is the act of carrying out vigilante activities through the Internet. The term encompasses vigilantism against alleged scams, crimes, and non-Internet-related behavior.

The expanding scope of media savvy and online interaction has enabled vigilantes to utilize methods specific to the Internet in order to distribute justice to parties they consider to be corrupt, but who have not committed a formal crime or have not been held accountable by the criminal justice system.

Internet vigilantism originated in the early 2000s and has since evolved to include a variety of methods such as hacking, baiting, and public shaming. Internet vigilantism changes in cultural and political drive depending on location, and has varying relationships to state authority depending on context. There are many internet vigilante groups as well as individuals.

== Description ==
The term internet vigilantism describes punitive public denunciations, aimed at swaying public opinion in order to “take justice into one's own hands” by engaging in forms of targeted surveillance, unwanted attention, negative publicity, repression, coercion or dissuasion. Associate professor in sociology Benjamin Loveluck identifies the four main forms of internet vigilantism as: flagging, investigation, hounding, and organized denunciation. Also referred to by Steve Man as Sousveillance, meaning "to watch from below", internet vigilantism can work as a type of peer surveillance. This is based on the premise that shame can be used as a form of social control. Augustė Dementavičienė defines the phenomena through the concept of Swarms, which are "Short term relationships between consumers formed for the purpose of achieving a goal". There are muddied overlaps between internet vigilantism and cyberbullying, as both utilize public shaming methods, and cyberbullying may sometimes be conducted under the guise of internet vigilantism. This is in the case that the vigilante "realizes they aren't achieving social justice but utilize it as a means of rationalizing their acts". Cyberbullying often involves publishing of private information to publicly humiliate the target, but is typically driven by the bully's ability to get away with harassment, rather than a desire for social change. Digital vigilantism can also overlap with digital activism, as the awareness of a social issue may increase due to the dissemination of information and weaponization of visibility associated with digital vigilante tactics. Visibility enables the broadening of social outrage, and is used in digital social justice campaigns such as #MiTuInChina. Some activists, known as "video vigilantes," expose their perpetrators through pictures, surveillance footage, and public testimony on social media platforms.

== Methods ==
The following are methods of internet vigilantism that have been used or proposed for use:

=== Weaponized Exposure ===
A common tool amongst digital vigilantes is the “Weaponisation of Visibility” for social pressure to create change. By exposing “harmful” individuals to the Internet, ‘digilantes’ hold them accountable in the court of public opinion. Such exposure is not always merely for retribution. One study on women TikTok users found these actions can transform shame into collective empowerment and create protective networks to safeguard potential future victims.

=== Online shaming ===
The act of publicly shaming other internet users online. Those who are shamed online have not necessarily committed any social transgression. Online shaming may be used to get revenge (for example, in the form of revenge pornography), stalk, blackmail, or to threaten other internet users. Emotions, social media as a cultural product, and the mediascape, are all important factors as to how online shaming is perceived.

=== Doxing ===
The act of publishing personal details online to incur social punishment of the target. In 2019, the Kentucky Senate proposed a bill to ban the doxxing of children after a teenager, Nick Sandmann and a Native American activist, Nathan Phillips were filmed in a confrontation at a protest rally which went viral. Sandmann's father claimed his son endured "The most sensational Twitter attack on a minor child in the history of the Internet."

=== Reintegrative shaming ===
Public shaming based on the perspective that the act is meant to shame the behavior rather than the target, and that the target can be redeemed and reintegrated into society. This approach utilizes shame as a means of social control and deterrent from deviating from social norms.

=== Human flesh search engine ===
A method originating in China in the early 2000s, which works as a cyber manhunt. It consists of crowdsourcing and pooling together information from the public via online forums to conduct vigilante justice through the Internet.

=== Information entropy ===
In the field of internet vigilantism, information entropy is an act intended to disrupt online services.

=== Denial of Service attacks ===
DoS and DDoS attacks, a form of information entropy, involve a widespread effort to make a website inaccessible to legitimate users. The method is to overwhelm the website with traffic so that it crashes. DoS attacks grew in popularity due to Low Orbit Ion Cannon (LOIC), which is an open source application that enables denial of service attacks.

=== Hacktivism ===
Hacking which is used as a form of political activism.

=== Scam baiting ===
When vigilantes interact with scammers simply to waste their time and resources. Others, such as Northern Irish scam baiter Jim Browning, carry out investigative operations infiltrating call centres and intervening in the case of victims who are scammed out of their money.

=== Identity theft activism ===
Identity theft activism is similar to scam baiting but deals with identity theft.

== Legality ==
In 2002 in the United States, Representative Howard Berman proposed the Peer to Peer Piracy Prevention Act, which would have protected copyright holders from liability for taking measures to prevent the distribution, reproduction or display of their copyrighted works on peer-to-peer computer networks. Berman stated that the legislation would have given copyright holders "both carrots and sticks" and said that "copyright owners should be free to use reasonable, limited self-help measures to thwart P2P piracy if they can do so without causing harm." Smith College assistant professor James D. Miller acknowledged the threats to the privacy of legitimate internet users that such actions would pose, but drew comparisons with other successful crime-fighting measures that can invade privacy, such as metal detectors at airports.

== Historical origins ==
Internet vigilantism originated in the early 2000s. It gained traction as a widespread social phenomena in China, where it has been used as a method of exposing government corruption and utilizing civic engagement. It is also a means of sharing previously censored or unavailable information. The popularity of these activities arose due to the Human flesh search engine, which enables the conduction of cyber manhunts. The first of these manhunts was conducted in 2006, when a video surfaced online of a woman killing a kitten with her high heels. A similar example can be seen in the Netflix TV show Don't F**k with Cats: Hunting an Internet Killer, in which a widespread effort by internet vigilantes is made to track down a serial cat murderer on the Internet, who had been posting anonymous videos of their activities. In 2008, cyber vigilantism was used in Shenzhen, China to expose a government official for attempted child molestation. Surveillance videos from the restaurant in which the assault took place were released on the Internet to expose the official, as he had previously claimed his government position would protect him from incurring any punishment.

Internet vigilantism has also been used to punish online bullies. For example, the case of Megan Meier, a teenager who committed suicide due to online bullying. The perpetrators were doxxed by bloggers who committed themselves to ensuring their social punishment and loss of employment.

In Singapore, cyber vigilantism became a popular form of peer surveillance and is largely viewed as a form of civic engagement. Whereas acts of online vigilantism in China have largely been used as a means of punishment and exposing social corruption, cases in Singapore revolve mainly around exposing fellow citizens for inconsiderate behavior such as not cleaning up after one's dog. Online shaming is viewed by the vigilantes as reintegrative shaming, as they claim their actions are a means of shaming the behavior rather than the perpetrator. This brand of vigilantism is seen as being in line with the morals of a largely collectivist society.

== Social origins ==
Sibai, Luedicke and de Valck (2024) have shown that digital vigilantism, as a standing feature of digital culture, can be traced back to dynamics of social media brutalization, whereby verbal violence becomes an endemic feature of social media interaction. They showed that digital vigilantism emerged as the product of oppressive social media structures (structural violence) and narratives normalizing violent behaviors (cultural violence). As these social media fixtures suppress social media users desire and need for justice, promoting the reproduction of violent vigilante behaviors. In particular, they showed that digital vigilantism is produced by minarchy, where social media governors fail to enforce community norms, leaving it to members to fend for their communities and narratives of fair punishment, justifying verbally violent vigilante behaviors as educational. They further root the prevalence of minarchy and narratives of fair punishment in techno-libertarian ideologies social media are born out of that consider online worlds anarchistic “techtopia[s]”. These ideologies favor ultraliberal, minarchic governance structures, which in turn fuel the perpetuation of just punishment narratives and vigilante policing behaviors on social media sites.

== Relationship to authority ==
Digital vigilantism can be viewed as a menace to the authorities, or an expression of digital citizenship, depending on the context. Vigilantes may view their actions as digital citizenship if they are seeking to improve the safety of online interaction.

According to K.K. Silva, "Vigilantes' responses to perceived malicious activity have reportedly caused the loss of digital evidence, thereby obstructing law enforcement's effort in ascertaining attribution and jurisdiction over cybercrime offences." Therefore internet vigilantism is generally in opposition to legitimate criminal investigations, and viewed as tampering with evidence. However, there are cases in which internet vigilantism is legally protected, such as when it falls under laws relating to protection of the other. There have also been cases in which vigilantes have cooperated with criminal justice investigations, such as the cases of BrickerBot and WannaCry ransomware attack. In both of these cases, vigilantes cooperated with authorities, utilizing cybercrime methods to fight cybercrime and prevent further damage.

Conversely, internet vigilantism can also work for the interests of the Government or for the government, as is sometimes the case in Russia. Two non profit groups practicing internet vigilantism, Safe Internet League, and Molodezhnaia Sluzhba Bezopasnosti (Youth Security Service), attempted to pass a bill that would enable unpaid volunteers to regulate the Internet, also known as the Cyber Cossak movement. These groups argue that their aim is to identify content that is extreme or dangerous for children such as child porn, and track down the creators of the content", however, the bill has drawn high amounts of skepticism from those who argued that it is reminiscent of Soviet peer surveillance and a breach of data privacy rights.

The Russian youth group Nashi, who conducted a vigilante project called StopXam, had been publicly supported by Vladimir Putin, who had posed for a picture with them. The group became prominent in the Russian media through publicly shaming bad drivers and filming their (often violent) altercations with them. The group fell out of favor with the Russian government and was liquidated after targeting an Olympic athlete.

In the case of the Unite the Right rally in Charlottesville, Virginia, internet vigilantism was used to help police track down violent protestors, as well as bring justice when the police were considered by the public to be doing so inadequately. This included doxing and public shaming of the protestors via Twitter.

== Internet vigilante groups ==
There are many internet vigilante groups permeating the Internet, with different motivations and levels of anonymity.

- Anonymous, a hacktivist group responsible for Operation Payback
- Safe Internet League, a Russian non-profit dedicated to regulating extremist material online.
- Molodezhnaia Sluzhba Bezopasnosti (Youth Security Service), a Russian non-profit dedicated to regulating extremist material online.
- StopXam (also known as "Stop a Douchebag"), a Russian youth group that publicly shames bad drivers via online videos.
- Zomri, a Slovak online community which publishes political satire on Facebook, in means of inspiring civic engagement.

== See also ==
- Anonymous
- Call-out culture
- Conflict-of-interest editing on Wikipedia
- Crowdsourcing
- Human flesh search engine
- Internet activism
- Patriotic hacking
- Scam baiting
- Vigilantism in the United States of America
