= Alexander Nevzorov =

Russian-Ukrainian journalist and writer (born 1958)

- Александр Невзоров
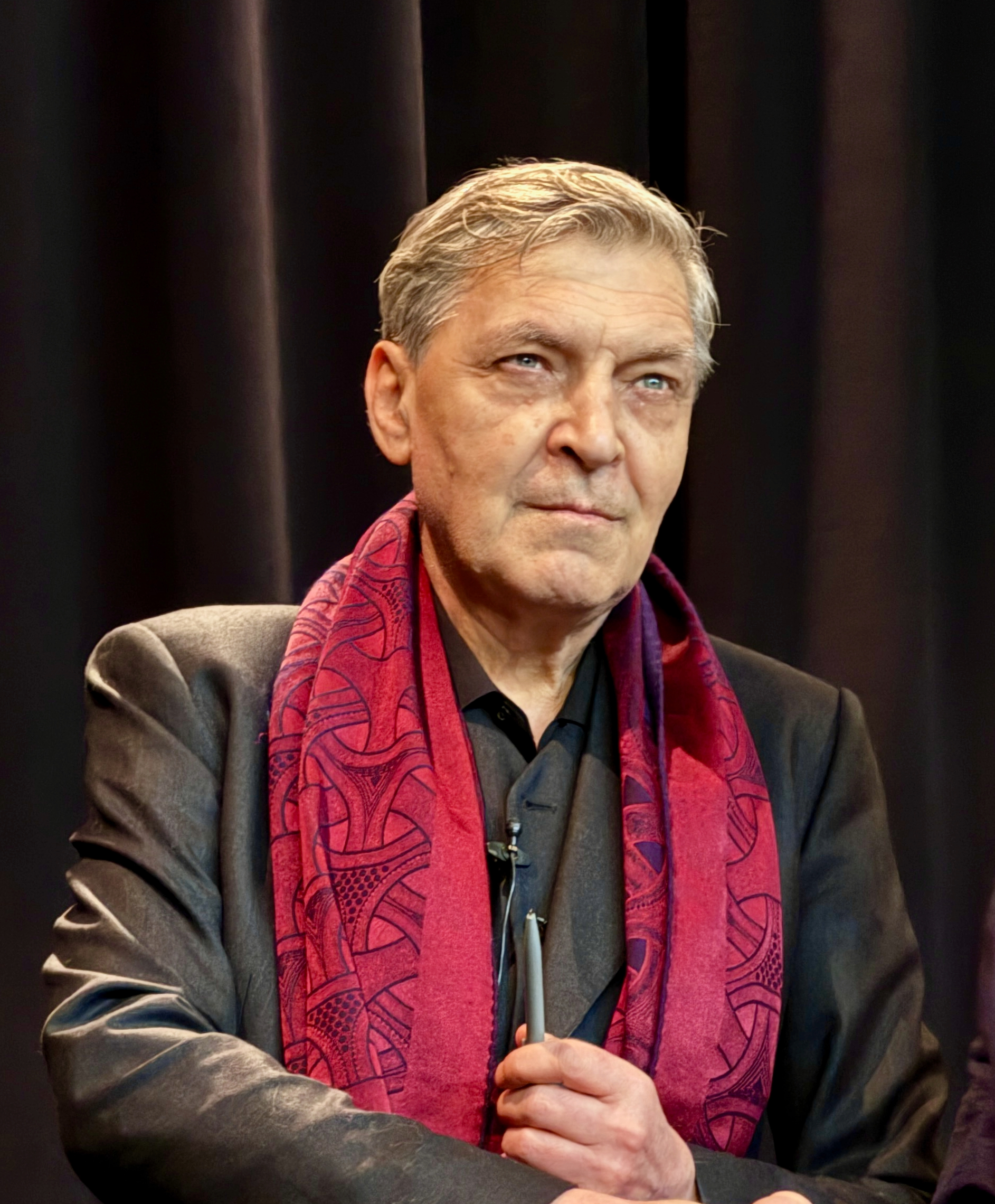
- Nevzorov in 2024

Member of the State Duma
- In office 12 December 1993 – 24 December 2007

Personal details
- Born: 3 August 1958 (age 68) Leningrad, Soviet Union
- Citizenship: Soviet Union (until 1991); Russia (since 1991); Ukraine (since 2022)
- Spouse(s): Natalia Nevzorova (divorced); Aleksandra Yakovleva (divorced); Lidia Nevzorova
- Children: 2
- Occupation: Journalist, news presenter, opinion journalist, film director, screenwriter, politician, blogger
- Website: nevzorov.tv

Alexander Glebovich Nevzorov (Note: In this name that follows East Slavic naming customs, the patronymic is Glebovich and the family name is Nevzorov.) (Russian: Александр Глебович Невзоров; born on 3 August 1958) is a Russian and Ukrainian television journalist, film director and a former member of the Russian State Duma. He has been continuously speaking out against the Russian invasion of Ukraine.

== Biography ==
Nevzorov was born on 3 August 1958 in Leningrad.

He started working for the Leningrad television in 1985. From December 1987 to 1993, he hosted the program 600 Seconds on the Leningrad TV channel, aired then all over the Soviet Union. On 12 December 1990 he was shot and wounded during a meeting with someone who pretended to have sensitive documents to offer. In late 1991 his program was taken off the air twice and later gradually lost its popularity. During the 1991 coup d'état attempt, Nevzorov supported the State Committee on the State of Emergency, the organ of the coupists. Nevzorov formed the Nashi movement (not to be confused with the later pro-Putin youth movement of the same name). The broadcast was finally closed down in the aftermath of Yeltsin's victory in his confrontation with the Russian Supreme Soviet (Nevzorov had supported the anti-Yeltsin side).

Nevzorov worked as a reporter in the Yugoslav Wars and the Transnistrian War in 1992–1993.

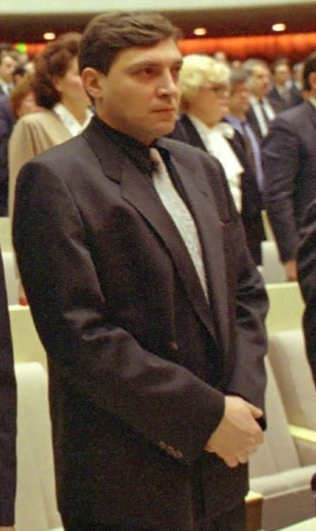
Nevzorov as a deputy of the State Duma in 1994

In the 1993 campaign, Nevzorov was elected deputy in the State Duma of the Russian Federation for the first time, and after that was re-elected as an independent deputy three times, serving until the 2007 elections when the single constituency seats were abolished.

He served as an adviser on film, TV and radio to Vladimir Yakovlev during the latter's tenure as the Governor (mayor) of Saint Petersburg.

In 1994 Nevzorov was a vocal supporter of the initiation of the First Chechen War. In 1997 he wrote and directed the TV film Chistilishche ("Purgatory") about the Chechen war, co-produced with Boris Berezovsky and released in March 1998. As the Chechen War dragged on, his views changed and he became skeptical of Russian imperialism. He regretted his past nationalist positions, and said in 2015 about his involvement in Nashi:

I experimented with fascism in laboratory, soft forms. I don't have to spend my whole life following ideas whose delusion has become obvious to me.

In 2003 Nevzorov collaborated with the ORT TV channel and often appeared as a political commentator on Sergey Dorenko's Saturday night news show.

In 2012, Nevzorov supported Vladimir Putin during his presidential campaign, and was his authorised representative.

In 2014 Nevzorov opposed the annexation of Crimea by the Russian Federation.

=== Russian invasion of Ukraine ===
In a video posted to YouTube on 11 April 2021, during the build-up of Russian forces near the Ukrainian borders, Nevzorov predicted that the future Russian invasion of Ukraine is inevitable and will end in tragedy and humiliation for Russia. He also predicted fierce Ukrainian resistance.

After the Russian invasion of Ukraine began in earnest, Nevzorov was charged on 22 March 2022 under Russia's "false information" law after he published information that Russian forces had shelled a maternity hospital in Mariupol. He could be sentenced to up to 15 years in prison. Nevzorov said that Vladimir Putin's "regime is not going to spare anyone, and that any attempts to comprehend the criminal war [in Ukraine] will end in prison." Nevzorov's wife Lidia stated on social media that her husband was in Israel.

On 22 April 2022, Nevzorov was added by the Russian government to the list of individuals acting as foreign agents.

In June 2022, Nevzorov and his wife Lidia submitted an application to the Ministry of Foreign Affairs of Ukraine for Ukrainian citizenship. On 3 June, Nevzorov and the State Migration Service of Ukraine confirmed that Nevzorov and his wife had received Ukrainian citizenship. On 6 June, Secretary of the National Security and Defense Council of Ukraine Oleksiy Danilov stated that Nevzorov did not yet have citizenship, but that he had only applied for it.

In March 2025, Nevzorov and his wife were added to the Rosfinmonitoring list of terrorists and extremists.

== Views and positions ==
In 1990s Nevzorov was an Orthodox Christian, but became atheist in later life and became critical of religion. He began criticize Russian Orthodox Church and opposed the introduction of "Fundamentals of Orthodox Culture" in Russian schools.

Nevzorov accused ROC clergy members of child sexual abuse, and of homosexuality, and tried to publish a book about it. In 2011, Archpriest Vsevolod Chaplin rejected his accusations in a statement, and called him a liar, after which Nevzorov promised to write and publish the book. In a 2013 interview with Ksenia Sobchak on the TV Rain, Nevzorov claimed that the book was based on "existing documents" rather than being his own original work, and that, by his own account, he won't add anything of his own to the book.

Nevzorov approves euthanasia, abortions, considering it as 'normal,' and believes that every person has the right to commit suicide. He considers Russian annexation of Crimea to be "looting," yet claims he is not a moralist and sees "nothing wrong with looting".

Nevzorov was a monarchist, held right-wing views, and in 1990s posed in the military uniform of the Tsarist army.
