= Ridus =

Russian online newspaper

- Editor: Gulyutin Andrey Igorevich
- Format: online
- Publisher: Andrey Vargin
- Founder: Ilya Varlamov
- Founded: 2011
- Based in: Russia
- Language: Russian
- Website: ridus.ru

Ridus (Russian: Ридус) is an online periodical newspaper with both editorial and user submitted content. Briefly serving as an activist outlet for citizen journalism and skyrocketing in popularity among a young adult demographic, the outlet's original creators left within two years of its founding and its writing quickly drifted closer to government opinion; the publication is now largely seen as a propaganda outlet of the Russian state.

== Background ==
Ridus was launched in September 2011. It was created by a photoblogger Ilya Varlamov (who became an Art Director). The website was designed by Art. Lebedev Studio, and former employees of many Russian online publications became the editorial staff. Vyacheslav Varvanin became the Chief Editor.

The outlet first came to prominence a few months after its creation, during its coverage of the 2011–2013 Russian protests. On December 10, 2011, the website was viewed more than a million times in one day, and by the end of the month, the outlet was ranked tenth in the citation rating of Medialogia Internet resources.

The paper was later suspected of collaboration with the Presidential Administration of Russia, after repeated publications of pro-government youth movements and affiliated figures. By 2013, all of the founding staff of Ridus had left the organization, and the outlet descended further into support of the government. The site began to regularly publish compromising materials on opposition political figures, and against this background, it was removed from Medialogia ratings. In April 2013, Maxim Deputatov left the paper, after which the editorial policy of Ridus became even more pro-government.

Among other controversies, the paper has published such unsubstantiated claims as Vesyoly Molochnik milk cartons promote homosexuality to children, that Russian shelling of a kindergarten in Donbas during the 2022 Russian invasion of Ukraine was a "Ukrainian psyop", and that American laboratories in Ukraine were collaborating with Ukrainian forces to deploy biological weapons against Russia.

== Awards and recognitions ==
- Runet Prize (2011)

== See also ==
- Kristina Potupchik
- Young Guard of United Russia
- Society of Blue Buckets
