= Vasily Yakemenko =

Russian politician

- Василий Якеменко
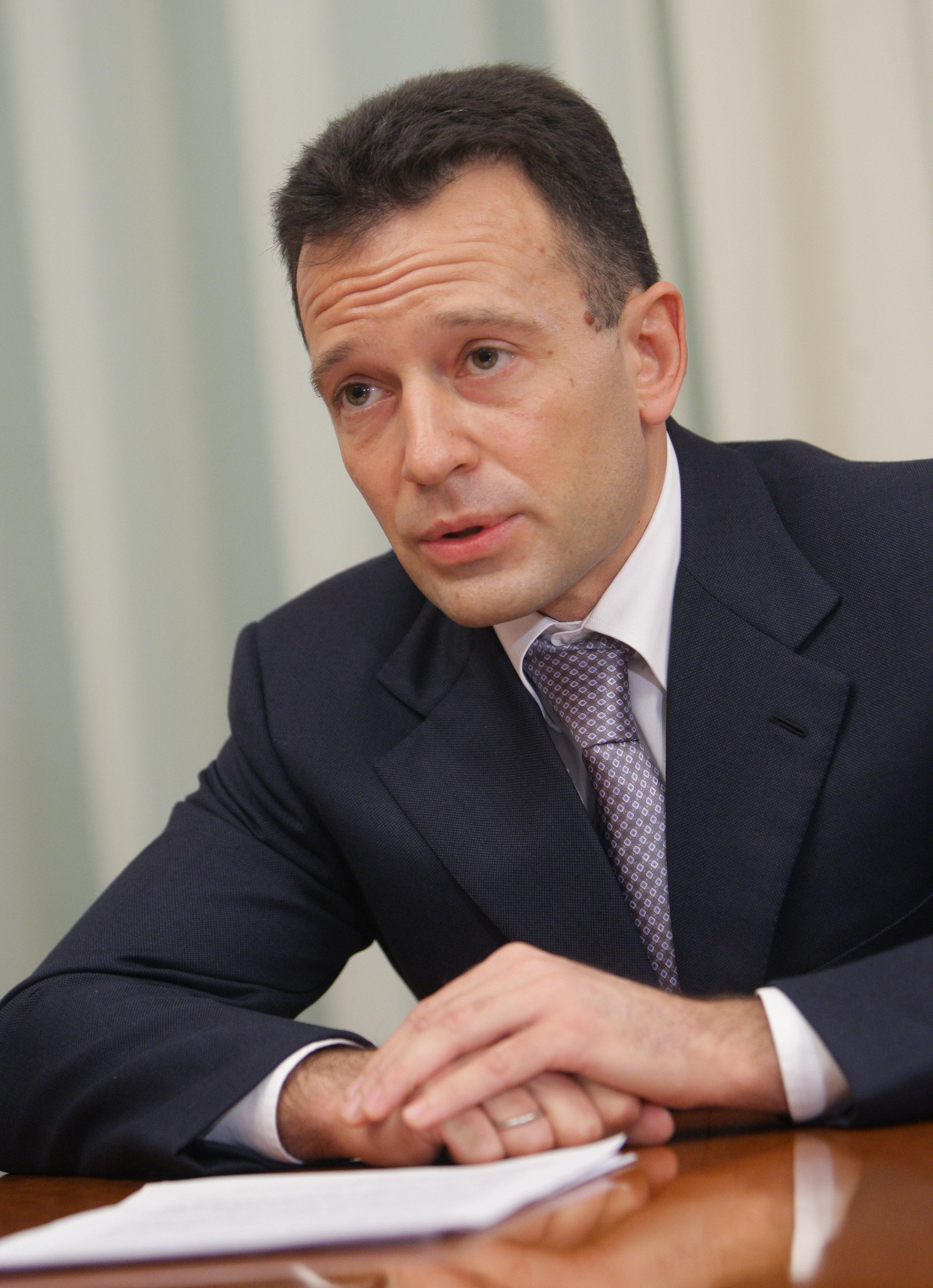
- Yakemenko in 2010

Head of the Federal Agency for Youth Affairs
- In office 10 October 2007 – 13 June 2012
- Preceded by: Position established
- Succeeded by: Sergei Belokonev

Head of Nashi movement
- In office 2005–2007
- Preceded by: Position established
- Succeeded by: Nikita Borovikov

Personal details
- Born: 27 May 1971 (age 55) Lyubertsy, Soviet Union
- Education: State University of Management; Moscow State Social University
- Awards: Order of Honour

Vasily Grigoryevich Yakemenko (Russian: Василий Григорьевич Якеменко, born 27 May 1971 in Lyubertsy, Moscow Oblast, Soviet Union) is a Russian politician, creator and leader of several pro-government youth groups, most famously Nashi. Yakemenko, a close ally of Vladislav Surkov, left politics following the demise of Nashi in 2013.

== Biography ==
From 1989 to 1991, Yakemenko served in the Soviet Armed Forces. He then studied at the economics department of Moscow State University. In the 1990s, he was financial director of various construction companies.

== Political career ==
In December 1999, Yakemenko first appeared in Russian politics with an open letter on behalf of the director of the group "Lying Music" signed by V. G. Yakemenko, published as an advertisement in the newspaper Izvestia, in which he accused supporters of Yevgeny Primakov of inflicting a closed craniocerebral injury on him.

In May 2000, Yakemenko founded the youth movement Walking Together (Russian: Идущие вместе, Idushie vmyestye), which became well known for its mass actions in support of Vladimir Putin and scandalous actions against the authors Vladimir Sorokin, Victor Pelevin, and Bayan Shiryanov and the band Leningrad.

At the beginning of 2000, Yakemenko worked for two months in the Presidential Administration of Russia, heading the department for relations with public organizations of the internal policy department.

In 2005, Yakemenko became the Federal Commissioner of Nashi (Russian: Наши), a new pro-Putin youth movement. Yakemenko called the movement "anti-fascist," saying that its task is to eradicate "the alliance of oligarchs and anti-Semites, Nazis, and liberals."

In 2005, Yakemenko founded, co-organized, and inspired the annual Seliger youth forum, which has been held since 2005.

On 8 October 2007, Prime Minister Viktor Zubkov appointed Yakemenko as head of the newly created State Committee for Youth Affairs, which was later reformed into the Federal Agency for Youth Affairs. An insider at the NTV channel has said that its Director General Vladimir Kulistikov routinely bans negative stories about Yakemenko and Rosmolodyozh.

Since December 2007, Yakemenko has been prohibited from entering the Schengen countries at the request of Estonia, which accused Vasily Yakemenko of organizing an attack on the Estonian Ambassador to the Russian Federation, Marina Kaljurand.

In October 2011 socialite, journalist and TV personality, Ksenia Sobchak, spotted Yakemenko at Mario's – one of Moscow's top restaurants. She had a videocamera with her and began asking him for an interview. When he turned her down, Sobchak said: "Look at this restaurant, this menu – Bellini champagne for 1,300 rubles a glass, fresh oysters for 500 rubles each. I mean, it’s not surprising for me to be here, I’m a socialite, but you! It’s everything for the party with you, everything for Nashi." After the encounter, Sobchak posted the video on the internet and it "went viral". Sobchak also pointed out that Yakemenko had said in 2009 that intended to eat less and stay fit: "A person who eats more than he needs robs the country and robs [Vladimir] Putin".

In 2012, Yakemenko announced that he would create a new party called the "Party of Power", which would fight United Russia but support Putin.

On 13 June 2012, Russian Prime Minister Dmitry Medvedev signed a decree dismissing Yakemenko from the post of head of the Federal Agency for Youth Affairs.

In July 2012, Yakemenko announced that he had purchased a €16 million property in Bavaria.

On 25 December 2012, in an interview, Yakemenko stated that the creation of his political party was stopped due to a lack of interest on the part of the Presidential Administration.

From 17 to 19 May 2013, at the Seliger forum, Yakemenko held the 6th congress of the Nashi movement. However, a number of new commissars under the leadership of the head of the central apparatus, Artur Omarov, and the former press secretary of the movement, Kristina Potupchik, refused to participate in the congress. The mentioned commissioners stated that this is Vasily Yakemenko's personal event, which they do not support and will not attend. After this statement, they were expelled from the movement.

== Later career ==
=== 2025 interview ===
On January 5, 2025, Yakemenko sat in Moscow for an interview with Russian YouTuber Stanislav Rozhenkov. Initially, the interview attracted little attention, but it reached a wide audience the following weekend due to its controversial content. In the interview, Yekemenko labeled himself a "crook" who had "made a hell of a lot of money" from Nashi, stating that the youth movement was dissolved because it failed to do "what it was paid for", for instance, suppressing the 2011 Russian Protests. Yakemenko also stated that he did not believe in the concept of Russia "as a nation", rather conceiving of the country as consisting of millions of "individual, scared people". He also expressed pity for Vladimir Putin and participants in the Special military operation, and labeled the government in which he had worked "degenerate" and corrupt.

The interview caused furore in Russia. Aleksandr Dugin called Yakemenko "a real bastard" on Telegram. State Duma deputy Biysultan Khamzaev petitioned the Federal Investigative Committee to investigate Yakemenko's remarks, citing his "boorish" and "baseless" accusations against the Russian Government.

On November 3, 2025, Yakemenko was doused with ryazhenka outside the Emerald Hotel in Saint Petersburg. The unregistered party The Other Russia of E.V. Limonov claimed responsibility, stating that the attack was carried out by a Nazbol cadre in response to Yakemenko's claims in the interview. The Other Russia activists attacked Yakemenko's brother, Boris, in a similar incident the prior June.

== Personal life ==
Yakemenko has married twice, and has two children. His second wife, Maria Soboleva, is the head of Rosmolodyozh's fitness initiative "Run After Me". In 2002, he graduated from Moscow State Social University. In his 2025 interview, he stated that he and his wife engaged in relationships outside of marriage.
