= Seliger (forum) =

Russian educational forum

- Genre: International youth educational (camp) forum (creativity, politics, volunteering, innovation)
- Dates: 2005–2014
- Locations: Ostashkov, Tver Oblast
- Country: Russia
- Founded: 2005
- Founders: Vasily Yakemenko

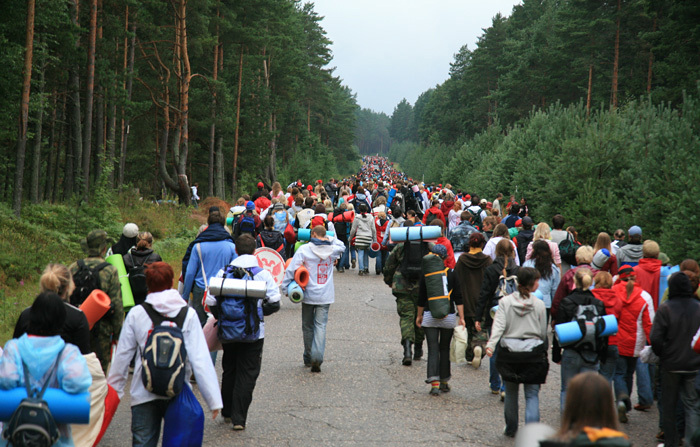
Seliger camp participants (2007)

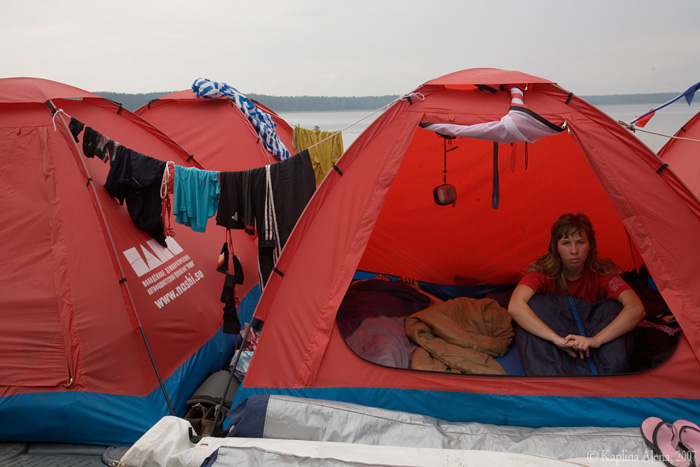
Participant staying in a tent (2007)

Seliger (Russian: Селигер) is a Russian youth educational forum held by the youth movement Nashi and the Federal Agency for Youth Affairs since 2005 at Lake Seliger in the Russian Tver Oblast (370 km from Moscow).

Since 2015, it has been succeeded by a new forum at a different location, titled Territory of Meanings.

== History ==
The Seliger Forum's logo was a smiley face wearing a red garrison cap emblazoned with the Nashi flag.

From 2000 to 2005, the first participants of this forum were activists of the Walking Together youth movement. From 2005 to 2008, the forum functioned as a closed commissar camp for Nashi activists and commissars. In 2005, it had approximately three thousand participants. The camp was held in one shift over two weeks and was divided into the following areas: economic, social, tourism, and mass actions. Nashi commissars and activists from all regional and city branches gathered at the camp, shared their experiences, and underwent ideological and athletic training. They also practiced techniques and methods for conducting mass actions and social work. In essence, the camp served as a training ground for future commissars of the movement. The educational program was conducted by the Higher School of Management of the Nashi movement, where the movement's commissars and activists were trained.

In 2009, as part of the Year of Youth, the Seliger commissar camp was reorganized into an educational forum and opened to all eligible youth. The educational program for forum participants was presented by the Sholokhov Moscow State University for Humanities.

According to the head of the Federal Agency for Youth Affairs, and Nashi leader Vasily Yakemenko, "The aim of the Seliger forums is to provide each talented young individual with a chance to realize their potential to the fullest, to convert talent into success". About 50 000 young people aged from 11 to 30 took part in the forum in 2009.

At the end of the 2013 Forum, the first public images of the flag of the Donetsk People's Republic made during the forum appeared on the internet.

== Financing ==
The forum was financed by the Federal Agency for Youth Affairs and by private donations. In 2009, it received more than 145 million rubles, in 2010 more than 180 million rubles, in 2011 more than 110 million rubles, in 2012 more than 280 million rubles, in 2013 about 250 million rubles, in 2014 received about 240 million rubles.

== Criticism ==
As part of the Nashi movement, the camp had been described as an attempt by the Kremlin to indoctrinate Russian youth.

Alexei Venediktov, editor-in-chief of the Echo of Moscow radio station, criticized the Seliger forum for displaying sculpted heads of various figures on stakes.

From 17 to 20 June 2011, opposition groups and environmental activists held the Antiseliger forum in the Khimki Forest near Moscow.
