= Happy Birthday, Mr. Putin! =

2010 erotic calendar

Happy Birthday, Mr. Putin! is an English title of the erotic calendar, released by the Russian publishing house "Fakultet" for the 58th birthday of Vladimir Putin on 7 October 2010. The calendar features twelve female students of the Faculty of Journalism at Moscow State University (MSU), in erotic lingerie, each for every month, with a short message. The print run consisted of 50,000 copies.

In less than one day, the images from the calendar have been reposted from its original web source by several thousands Russian users of LiveJournal. A day after the calendar's release, six other students of the same university made an Internet version, critical of Putin, which received an online support. The calendar was followed by a lampoon version with the heads of Russian politicians imposed on original female bodies. Other versions include that dedicated to the end of Valentina Matviyenko's gubernatorial tenure. A calendar, inspired by the original version, was also made for the Mayor of Omsk.

== Original calendar ==
The student girls for the calendar were selected via social network by one of the producers. The shootings lasted for three days and from over 10,000 shots thirteen were chosen. The girls are dressed in lacy lingerie and each page contains a speech balloon with the girl's name. The images were originally published on the LiveJournal page of Kristina Potupchik, a press-secretary of Russian youth movement Nashi. The movement, however, denied any connection with the calendar. According to calendar's producer Vladimir Tabak, the publishing house, which released the calendar, was established by the MSU students, who have never been the members of political youth organisations.

Each speech bubble text begins with "Vladimir Vladimirovich..." The messages are the following, starting from January: "Everyone would like a man like you", "How about a third go?" (referring to Putin's anticipated third presidential term), "The forest fires have been put out, but I'm still burning!" (referring to the 2010 Russian wildfires), "You are the best!", "I love you!", "Give me a ride on a Kalina!", "Would you take me as a co-pilot?", "Who else if not you?", "You only get better with the years", "You are my Premier", "I don't need a rynda. I need you" (referring to the internet meme "Putin's rynda") and "I want to congratulate you personally. Call 8-925-159-17-28".

== Alternative version ==
The alternative oppositional version features female students dressed in black and with taped mouths in protest. The pages accommodate two months and bear critical questions. According to one of the students, Margarita Zhuravlyova, they "didn't have to think long to come up with questions; people ask these questions in their daily lives, at home, at work, in the streets and on public transportation". The alternative version was advertised through LiveJournal and Twitter. The alternative version features the following questions: "When will Khodorkovsky be released?", "OK with fools, but what about roads?" (referring to the popular saying "There are two troubles in Russia: the fools and the roads" attributed to various prominent Russian authors), "How will inflation affect the bribes?", "Freedom of assembly always and everywhere?", "Who killed Anna Politkovskaya?" and "When will the next terrorist incident occur"?

== Reactions ==
The Moscow State University campus became divided into those supporting the alternative version and the other supporting the original calendar. The head of the MSU Faculty of Journalism Yelena Vartanova commented: "I think the calendar is quite frivolous but I don't see anything criminal in it. [...] It's a matter for their own conscience."

Putin's attitude was reportedly "indifferent"; according to Putin's spokesperson Dmitry Peskov, "[a]ll these questions have a right to exist and people have a right to ask them". Peskov also noted that "[t]his situation tells us about natural pluralism of opinions in our society and that it is important to have an active position in life, and such things should be encouraged unless they interfere with studies".
