= Movement of the First =

Russian youth movement

Movement of the First Движение первых
- Leader: Artur Orlov
- Founded: 18 December 2022
- Headquarters: 109028, Moscow, Zemlyanoy Val 50A, building 2
- Ideology: Conservatism
- Website: будьвдвижении.рф (in Russian) wefirst.ru (in English)

The Movement of the First (Russian: Движение первых, romanized: Dvizheniye pervykh) is a youth movement in Russia created on 18 December 2022 at the initiative of Russian president Vladimir Putin. Its stated goal is to organize leisure activities for youth and educate children, "including shaping their world views on the basis of traditional Russian spiritual and moral values." The group, open to children aged six and up, has been compared to the Soviet Union's Young Pioneers youth movement.

== History ==
In 2015, following the occupation of Crimea, Russian president Vladimir Putin had created a youth movement, the Russian Schoolchildren's Movement, apparently modeled after the Soviet Union's Young Pioneers, with the goal to "perfect state policy in the area of educating the young generation, [and] to support the forming of personalities on the basis of the value system inherent to Russian society", according to a decree made by Putin. The decree was signed and published on the 97th anniversary of the Soviet Union's Komsomol youth movement. Unlike the Komsomol, the new movement would reportedly be free of ideologies, communist or otherwise. The organization would later merge into the new Movement of the First.

Following the Russian invasion of Ukraine, on 19 May 2022, the 100th anniversary of the Young Pioneers Soviet youth movement, a project was submitted to the State Duma on the initiative of Putin for the creation of a new youth movement. Originally, the group was to be called "Bolshaya Peremena" (Russian: Большая перемена, literally "Big School-Break" but also "Big Change"), but lawmakers ultimately decided to let the organization's future members name it. On 14 July 2022, Putin signed the legislation into law. On 18 December 2022, several votes were held to determine the name of the organization, and on the third vote, the name "Movement of the First" was chosen, with Putin's preferred name, "Pioneers", coming in fourth out of five options. On 20 December 2022, the first branch of the Movement of the First met formally under their new name for the first time at Artek children's camp, a former Young Pioneers camp. Since the start of the Russian invasion of Ukraine, Artek has been used a re-education camp for illegally detained Ukrainian children.

On 21 March 2023, the movement registered its own television channel, "DVIZH". One week later, the movement's logo was revealed. It features a red "1" in the form of an arrow, with the word "Firsts" (Russian: Первые) above it.

== Organization ==
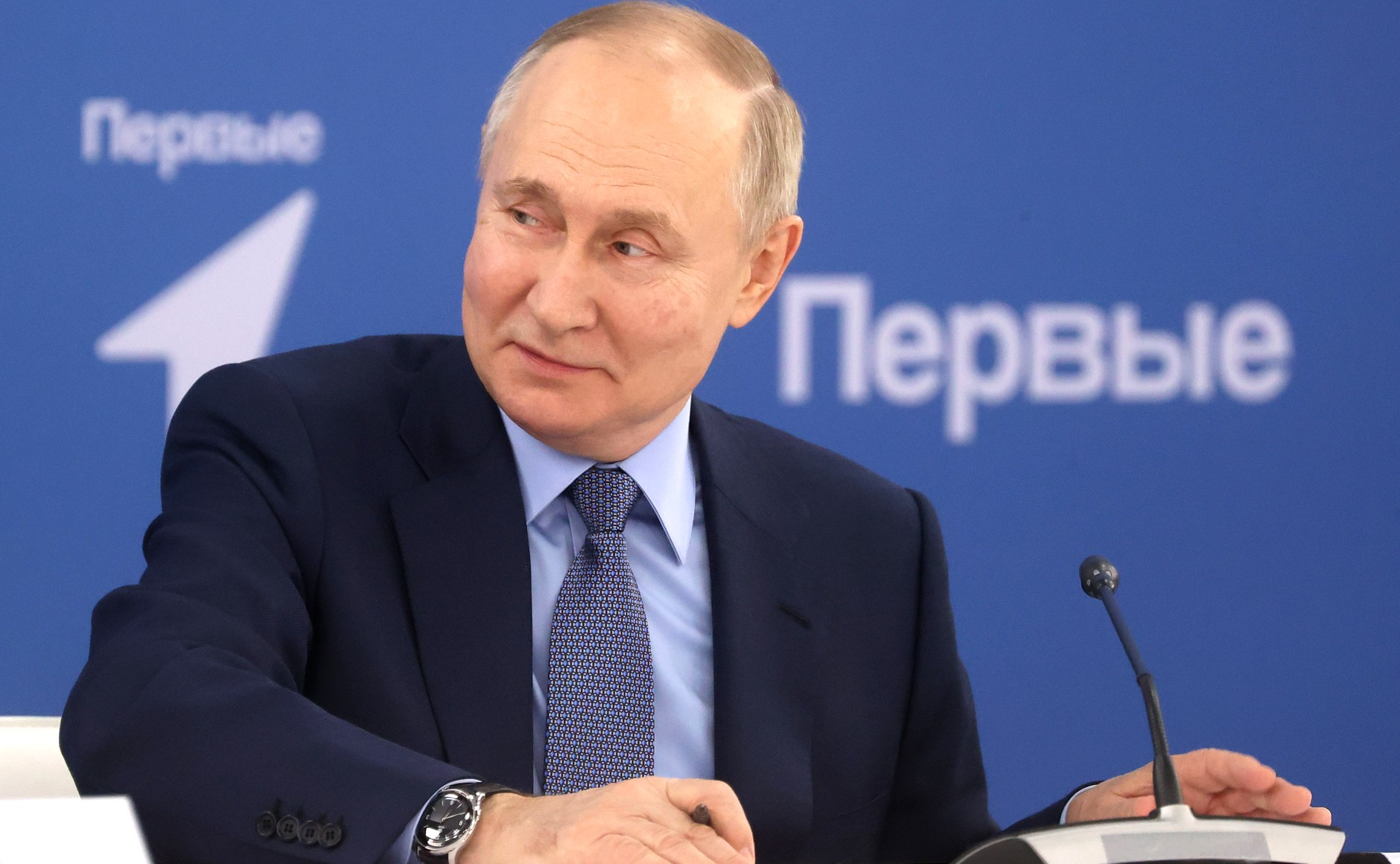
Vladimir Putin in December 2023

The organization is under the personal supervision of the President of Russia, who directly controls all three permanent governing bodies: the supervisory board, coordinating council, and board. He appoints the chairman of the board and the deputy of the supervisory board, and also heads the supervisory board. The supervisory board chairs the Coordinating Board and appoints the chairmen of the regional boards. The supervisory board of the movement is headed by the President of the country Vladimir Putin, the chairman of the movement is Grigory Gurov. Persons with the status of foreign agents are barred from partaking in educational activities.

Russian state news reports 40,000 offices opened across Russia and occupied territories, with around 7 million people having taken part in events organized by Movement of the First, and that 4.7 million people have joined the organization as of February 2024. Independent media have reported children have been forced or coerced into joining the organization.

=== Funding ===
The organization receives annual funding of 19 billion rubles. The Moscow Times noted the annual funding is comparable to the annual income of Russia's poor regions, such as Kalmykia or the Jewish Autonomous Oblast. Additionally, this budget is three times greater than the budget for "strengthening the material and technical base" of medical institutions. It is also five times greater than the 2023 budget for "the development of pharmaceutical and medical industries", the purported purpose of which is to replace imported drugs that have become unavailable due to international sanctions during the Russian invasion of Ukraine.

== Activities ==
Youths from the age of six until the completion of college may voluntarily join the organization. According to the state-run news agency TASS, the group's goal is to promote state police among children and youth, to provide "education, career guidance, [and] leisure activities", and to teach values and a worldview "based on traditional Russian spiritual and moral goals". The organization also organizes patriotic events, such as singing war songs and decorating windows on schools and homes as part of Victory Day celebrations. The movement has organized rallies, large events, and festivals for children, including the patriotic "All-Russian Festival". Putin has attended and delivered speeches at some of the events, including a passport ceremony, at which passports were ceremoniously awarded to 20 young people from Moscow who had excelled in sports, science, creative, educational, or volunteer activities. According to the chairman of the board, Grigory Gurov, "The solemn presentation of the Russian citizenship passport is an important event that helps a 14-year-old teenager realize their connection to the country, its cultural and historical heritage, and feel like part of a great nation united by common values and ideals".

According to a European Union legislative report, the movement's purpose is to educate or re-educate children, including in a militarized nature. Children in the movement have meetings with Russian soldiers who have fought in the Russian invasion of Ukraine, send cards, letters, and videos of support to soldiers, prepare equipment to be used on the battlefield, and learn how to handle unmanned aerial vehicles (aerial drones). The movement has also organized war games for children, replicating and simulating battle situations. One war game, referred to as "Zarnitsa 2.0" after the Young Pioneers Zarnitsa war game, includes a series of training, educational, and sports events in which schoolchildren learn about providing first aid, rescue operations, surviving in the wild, fire training, dealing with cyber threats, engaging in "combat" within a confined space, and operating ground and aerial drones.

The Movement of the First wrote at Vkontakte that on 9 March 2025, an 18 -year -old medical student Alexander Petlinsky was killed in Ukraine. At the beginning of the Russian invasion of Ukraine in 2022 he was 15 years old.

== Criticisms ==
Teachers have complained that much the work of local management of the organization has befallen them. While this has introduced a significant increase in their expected workload, hardly any teachers are paid for the additional work. Independent media reported that teachers made registration for Movement of the First mandatory for students, threatening students who do not register with consequences such as the entire class being excluded from school trips or events. Some parents have complained that, in some localities, there are no events or activities for children younger than 14 to participate in, even though the organization invites children as young as six.

The Movement of the First has been criticized by Western governments for its political re-education, especially in regard to its military nature, of children, including Ukrainian children, and for its complicity in the abduction of Ukrainian children.

=== International sanctions ===
On 20 September 2023, the Government of Canada imposed sanctions on the Movement of the First for its use and complicity in genocide (Note: The Canadian House of Commons voted unanimously in April 2022 to describe Russia's actions in Ukraine, including "the forcible transfer of Ukrainian children to Russian territory", as genocide.) in child abductions in the Russian invasion of Ukraine, and for "generating and disseminating disinformation and propaganda".

On 23 February 2024, the European Union imposed sanctions on both the Movement of the First and its chairman of the board, Grigory Gurov. An excerpt from the statement of reason follows:

[The activities of the Movement] are undertaken in all Russian regions as well as in illegally annexed Crimea, and the illegally occupied territories of Ukraine of Donetsk, Luhansk, Kherson and Zaporizhzhia regions. As such, the Movement through its various programmes is re-educating Ukrainian children, including those deported to Russia illegally.

Therefore, Movement of the First is supporting materially actions which undermine and threaten the territorial integrity, sovereignty and independence of Ukraine, and stability and security in Ukraine.

== See also ==
- Little Octobrists – Soviet Union children's organization
- Nashi (youth movement) – Russian youth movement (2005–2019)
- Walking Together – Former pro-Putin youth movement
- Young Army Cadets National Movement – Military youth movement in Russia
- Young Pioneers (Soviet Union) – Soviet Union youth organization
