= Anna Skroznikova =

Russian politician

Anna Skroznikova MP
- Анна Скрозникова
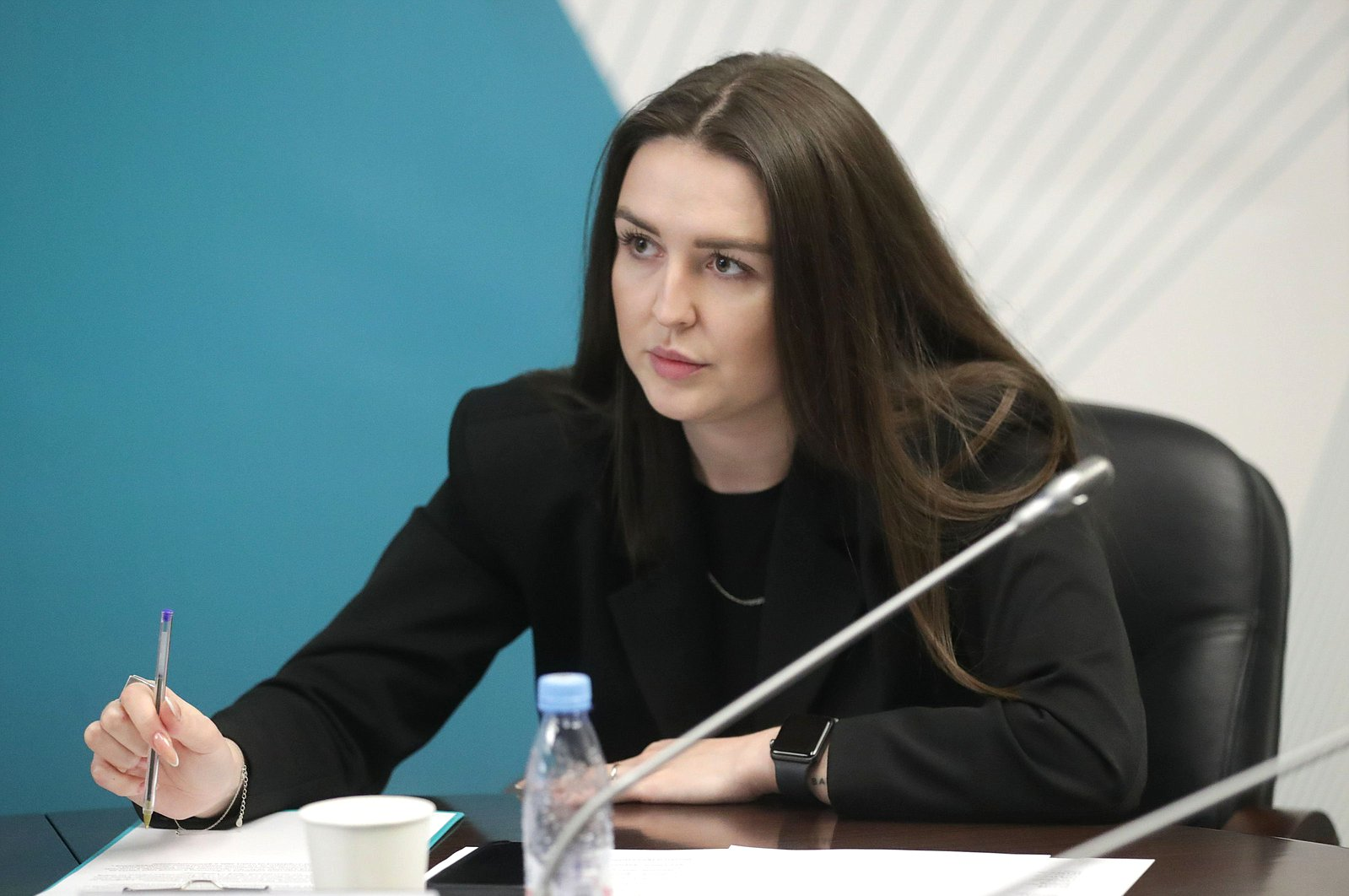

Member of the State Duma (Party List Seat)
- Incumbent
- Assumed office 29 March 2023
- Preceded by: Maksim Gulin

Personal details
- Born: 2 October 1995 (age 30) Chebarkul, Chelyabinsk Oblast, Russia
- Party: New People
- Education: Chelyabinsk State University
- Occupation: Teacher

Anna Valerievna Skroznikova (Russian: Анна Валерьевна Скрозникова; born on 2 October 1995), is a Russian politician who is currently a member of the State Duma since 29 March 2023.

== Biography ==
Anna Skroznikova was born on 2 October 1995 in Chebarkul, Chelyabinsk Oblast.

In 2017, she graduated from the Chelyabinsk State University with a degree in linguistics, after university she worked as a teacher.

She became a member of the New People (political party) after its formation in 2020. In 2021, she became a candidate for the elections to the 8th State Duma.

At the time of the nomination, she held the position of the head of the structural unit of the children's health-improving complex "Uralskaya Beryozka", owned by PJSC "Chelyabinsk Iron and Steel Works".

She was nominated in the for both the New People federal electoral list as well as in the single-mandate constituency Metallurgichesky (No. 190), where she took 4th place out of 9 candidates, receiving 6.67% of votes. After losing the elections to the State Duma of the VIII convocation, she moved to Yaroslavl.

On 29 March 2023, Skroznikova became a member of parliament. She received the vacant deputy mandate of Maksim Gulin, who resigned ahead of schedule in connection with the transition to work in the Russian Movement of Children and Youth.
