= StopXam =

Russian non-profit organization

- СтопХам
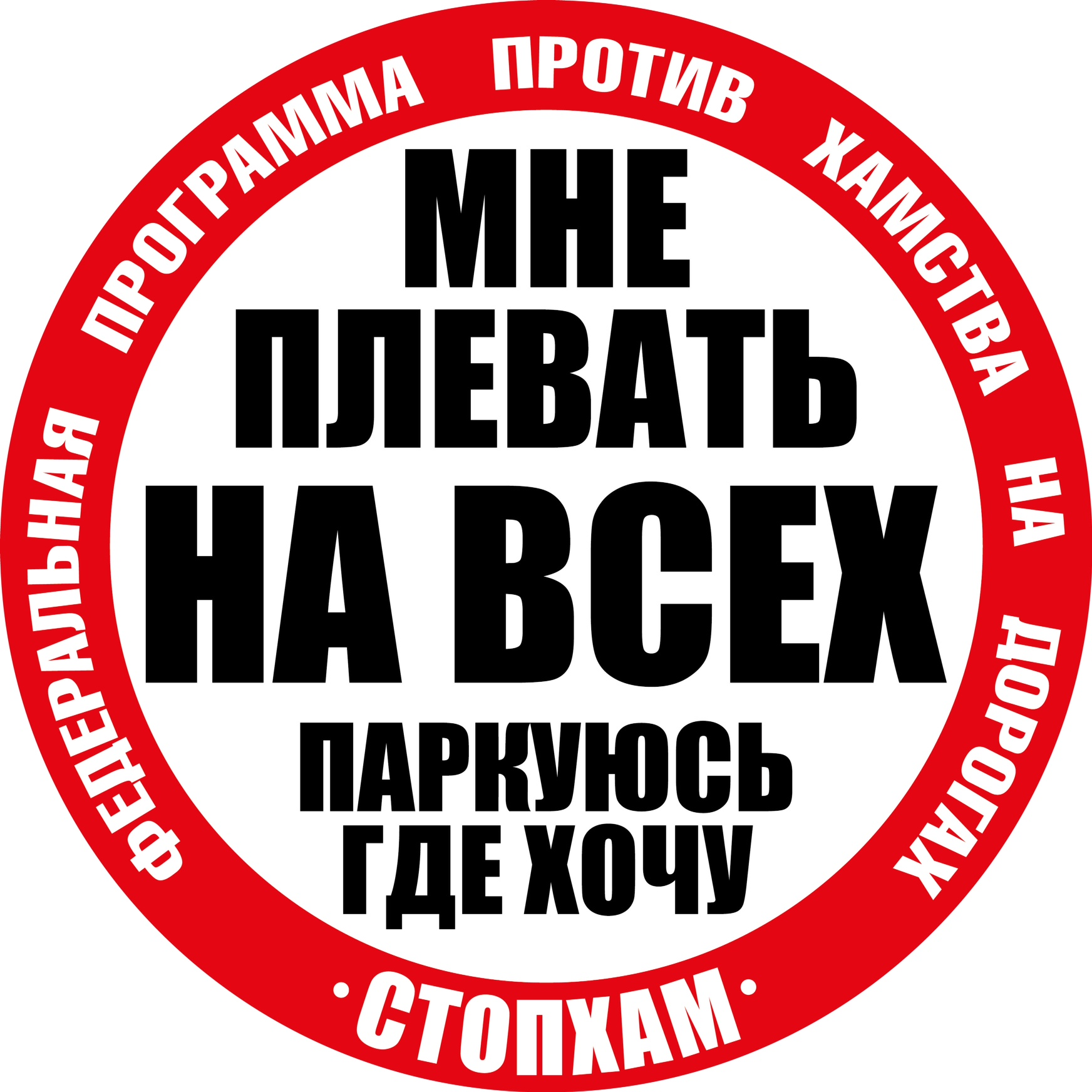
- Formation: founded 2010
- Founder: NASHI
- Type: Social movement
- Key people: Dmitrii Chugunov
- Volunteers: more than 100
- Website: http://stopxam.tv/en

StopXam (Russian: СтопХам), also spelled StopHam and known as Stop a Douchebag, is a Russian non-profit organization, headquartered in Moscow and founded in 2010 by members of the youth movement Nashi, which opposes traffic rule violations and arrogance on the road. The mode of operation of the activists is to film offenses and their conversations and confrontations with offenders and subsequently edit and upload the gathered footage to video-sharing websites such as YouTube. One of the popular strategies is to place big stickers with the phrase "I spit on everyone, I park where I want" (Russian: Мне плевать на всех, паркуюсь где хочу), attributed to the 'Federal Programme Against Arrogance on Roads', on car windshields of non-cooperative traffic offenders.

The name of the organization derives from the Russian slang term хам (kham), referring to a boor or lout but more abusive; a person who behaves in a crude disgusting way without respect for themselves or others; the closest English term would be scumbag. The term is a reference to the Biblical Ham.

A number of incidents involving activists of the movement have garnered significant public attention.

On 21 March 2016, by the Moscow City Court's decision the organization was liquidated. However, on 2 September 2016, the Supreme Court of Russia cancelled the decision.

== History ==
The project was founded in 2010 as one of the federal programs of the Nashi youth movement that existed in the NASHI-2.0 project, under the leadership of movement commissar Dmitry Chugunov. In July of the same year, the project was first presented at the Seliger forum and verbally approved by Russian Minister of Internal Affairs Rashid Nurgaliev.

The main goal of the public movement is the fight against traffic violations and neglect of others by its participants: parking in the wrong place, seizing urban land for parking lots, using sidewalks to travel by car, etc. Activists are looking for improperly parked cars that interfere with others, and, if there is a driver in the car, they turn to him with a request to park the car in accordance with traffic rules. In case of refusal or in the absence of a driver, a round sticker with the text "I don't care about anyone, I can park wherever I want" is put onto the windshield of the car on either the passenger's or driver’s side, and occasionally on the side or rear windows. The process, which is often accompanied by insults from drivers and attempts to fight with the activists demanding to stop the offense, is filmed on video media (telephones, cameras), after which the project activists compile videos and upload them to the Internet: on YouTube, VKontakte and on the official website of the movement.

On May 31, 2014, the project manager of StopHam, the commander of the Nashi movement Dmitry Chugunov, in the direction of developing public control, was elected a member of the Civic Chamber of the Russian Federation of the 5th composition, having received 21,883 votes in Internet voting. Subsequently, the project management was temporarily assigned to his supporter Kirill Bunin, but later on Chugunov returned to the post of direct supervisor.

Meanwhile, the Ministry of Internal Affairs has repeatedly evaluated the actions of StopHam activists. According to this assessment, the actions of the StopHam activists can be regarded as a violation of applicable law and fall under the responsibility stipulated by the articles of the Code of Administrative Offenses of the Russian Federation:

7.17 (destruction or property damage) 19.1 (arbitrariness) 20.1 (hooliganism)

The Minister of Internal Affairs of Karelia Vasily Kukushkin also notes that activists film their actions and post reports on the Internet without the consent of car owners, which "may carry signs of a crime under Article 137 of the Criminal Code of the Russian Federation "Violation of privacy ”.

=== Liquidation of a legal entity ===
The StopHam civil society organization promoting cultural cooperation in civil society was liquidated on March 21, 2016 by a decision of the Moscow City Court at the request of the Ministry of Justice. During federal state control, the State Department revealed repeated gross violations of the law in terms of reporting in the organization’s activities, after which in 2015 it applied to the Moscow City Court with a statement on the liquidation of the organization and the deletion of information about it from the Register of Legal Entities. On October 12, 2015, the court granted the claims of the State Institution. The decision was not appealed. In this regard, in the manner prescribed by applicable law, information about the organization 03/21/2016 was excluded from the Unified State Register of Legal Entities. On October 12, 2015, the court granted the claims of the State Institution.

=== Cancellation of liquidation by decision of the Supreme Court of the Russian Federation ===
On September 2, 2016, the Supreme Court of the Russian Federation cancelled the liquidation of StopXam, having satisfied the appeal of representatives of the Law & Wise Law Firm, who insisted that they were not notified of the court session at which the Justice Ministry’s lawsuit on the liquidation was examined. A month later, the Ministry of Justice refused the requirement to liquidate the movement, as the defendant eliminated the violations.

== Financing ==
In 2013, under the presidential grants, StopHam received 4 million rubles for its activities. In 2014, under the presidential grants, StopHam received 6 million rubles for its activities.

== Reception ==
In 2013, Vladimir Putin said to volunteers of the organisation:

You are doing a very important and good deed - fighting rudeness. Behavior on the roads is part of a person, and I hope very much that you, doing your work, will be at your best and will not be compared to those people who behave ugly in relation to others.

— Vladimir Putin

== Arrest of StopXam members ==
The conflict in question occurred in June 2022, when the activists filmed illegal parking by security forces on the Yaroslavskoye Highway. According to the activists, the police then attacked them, resulting in injuries to three StopHam participants, with one requiring hospitalization. However, police officers Artem Miroshnichenko and Nikolai Maskolev were recognized as victims, claiming they were attacked by hooligan provocateurs.

The defense argued that video and audio recordings from the conflict scene showed significant procedural violations, but these were not evaluated by the trial court. The activists were initially found guilty of using violence against a government official and hooliganism.

== Incidents ==
In April 2012, the project became famous after an incident at the Evropeisky shopping center in Moscow, in which Madina Mingaeva, the wife of Chechnya’s deputy envoy to the President of the Russian Federation, Tamerlan Mingaev, who incorrectly parked his car, and the Mingaev’s son, urgently called by his mother for a showdown, took part. The conflict ended in a brawl, during which Madina and Islam Mingaev tried to force operators to destroy the record, and also threatened them and their families with physical harm. However, the record hit the Internet, and as of April 2014 has been viewed on YouTube more than seven million times. Scandal erupted, criminal case on hooliganism was instituted. On May 5, 2012, Chechen President Ramzan Kadyrov officially announced the dismissal of Mingaev in connection with the unacceptable public actions of his wife. However, Kadyrov also condemned the actions of the activists of the movement, calling them “provocative”, and did not comment on the actions of Islam Mingaev.

In April 2013, activists blocked the car of a 24-year-old Margaret Arakelyan, consultant to the legal department of the Central Election Commission of the Russian Federation, at the moment when the girl was trying to park at a pedestrian crossing on Maroseyka Street. After verbal bickering, Arakelyan directed her car at the activists, almost crushing one of them. After that, the traffic violator got out of the car and rudely announced that she had the right to park the car at the crossing. At the same time, the activists were threatened with troubles if compromising videos were published. Nevertheless, the video was published by news agencies, which entailed the apology of the head of the Central Election Committee of the Russian Federation Vladimir Churov.

In July 2013, StopHam activists blocked the Range Rover car on the sidewalk, driven by Tatyana Smoryakova, the acting head of the Maryino District Council. Smoryakova brought down two activists and continued to move in a traffic jam. To the requests of the traffic police officers to stop, Smoryakova refused and laid out the prefecture's pass on the dashboard. Alexander Smoryakov, who arrived at the scene of an accident at the request of his wife, wrote a statement on a minor cyclist standing on the sidewalk and accused him of hitting himself. Arriving parents of this cyclist wrote a counter statement to give false evidence. The traffic police drew up a report on Tatyana Smoryakova on the fact of collision with pedestrians. The prefecture of South-Eastern Administrative Okrug later published an official statement that the prefecture does not issue permits for any right to the privileged movement of personal vehicles, and that issues related to the personal behavior of family members of civil servants are not related to the activities of the prefecture. The day after the conflict, Alexander Smoryakov submitted his resignation from his post as head of the district, which was accepted by Moscow Mayor Sergei Sobyanin.

In mid-October 2014, StopHam activists became accomplices in the fight against organized demolition of garages in the Timiryazevsky district of Moscow associated with the construction of a 35-story elite residential complex “DIHANIE”. So, one of the district's Garage Complexes underwent mechanized demolition by people in balaclavas without prior warning. Activists who came to the defense were brutally beaten and injured as a result of the use of pepper spray. Chugunov himself received six injuries and was hospitalized. According to the final data, the Garage Complexes were demolished.

On February 10, 2015, seven StopHam activists were brutally beaten and robbed by a group of people who arrived at the crime scene in four cars in St. Petersburg. The incident occurred near the house number 26/1 on Dachny Avenue. As a result of the attack, activists needed medical attention, and three of them - two young people and one girl - were hospitalized with moderate injuries. The attack was filmed on camera by a nearby car. On that fact, the Ministry of Internal Affairs of St. Petersburg opened a criminal case under Part 2 of Article 116 of the Criminal Code of the Russian Federation.

On February 26, 2016 in Petrozavodsk, as a result of the StopHam raid, one of the drivers on whose car the project sticker was pasted attacked activists with a knife, wounded one in the shoulder, and then fled the scene. The police quickly detained a suspect who, having traveled a short distance, tore the sticker off the windshield with the same knife. On the fact of the attack on the activist, a criminal case was instituted under part 2 of article 115 of the Criminal Code of the Russian Federation: “Intentionally causing minor harm to health from hooligan motives”.

== See also ==
- Lion Versus
- Nashi (youth movement)
