= Grigory Gurov =

Grigory Alexandrovich Gurov

Head of the Federal Agency for Youth Affairs
- Incumbent
- Assumed office 14 September 2024
- President: Vladimir Putin
- Prime Minister: Mikhail Mishustin
- Preceded by: Ksenia Razuvaeva; Denis Ashirov (acting)

Chairman of the Board of the Russian Movement of Children and Youth
- In office 13 December 2022 – 14 August 2024
- Preceded by: position established
- Succeeded by: Artur Orlov

Deputy minister of Science and Higher Education of the Russian Federation
- In office 17 August 2021 – 13 December 2022
- Minister: Valery Falkov

Deputy head of the Federal Agency for Youth Affairs
- In office 19 May 2020 – 17 August 2021
- Head of the Agency: Alexander Bugaev; Ksenia Razuvaeva
- Succeeded by: Denis Ashirov

Personal details
- Born: 31 October 1985 (age 41) Stavropol, Stavropol Kray, Russia
- Party: Movement of the First (from 2022)
- Education: North-Caucasus Federal University; Diplomatic Academy of the Ministry of Foreign Affairs of the Russian Federation; North Caucasus Humanitarian Institute
- Profession: lawyer, economist

Grigory Alexandrovich Gurov is a Russian government official. He is the Head of the Federal Agency for Youth Affairs, assuming the office on 14 September 2024. He is a member of the Coordinating Council of the Russian movement of children and youth.

He is a Chairman of the Board of the Russian Movement of Children and Youth (2022–2024).

== Biography ==
Gurov was born on October 31, 1985, in Stavropol, Stavropol Kray.

In 2006, he graduated from the Economics Department of the North Caucasus Institute of Humanities and Technology (Stavropol), and in 2019, he completed a master's degree in law at the Diplomatic Academy of the Ministry of Foreign Affairs of Russia (Moscow). Candidate of еconomic sciences.

In 2010, at Stavropol State University (now part of the North Caucasus Federal University), he defended his dissertation on «Improving methods of financing innovative projects: based on alternative energy».

In 2006-2007 Grigory Gurov was the chairman of the Youth Chamber at the Duma of the city of Stavropol.

In 2007–2008, he was a specialist in youth work at the Youth Initiatives center «Tramplin» city Stavropol.

In 2008–2010, he was Chairman of the Youth Parliament at the Duma of the Stavropol Kray.

In 2010–2016, he worked in the Department of Internal Policy of the Office of the Plenipotentiary Representative of the President of the Russian Federation in the North Caucasus Federal District.

In 2017, he was deputy director of the Russian Center for the Promotion of Youth Entrepreneurship in Moscow.

In 2017 Grigory Gurov joined the Federal Agency for Youth Affairs (Rosmolodezh), where he served as an adviser to the head of the department, then as the head of one of the departments.

From May 19, 2020, to August 17, 2021 - Deputy Head of Federal Agency for Youth Affairs, responsible for digital transformation issues. The department was headed by Alexander Bugaev until May 2021, then by Ksenia Razuvaeva.

From August 17, 2021, to December 13, 2022 - Deputy Minister of Science and Higher Education of the Russian Federation Valeria Falkova.

From December 13, 2022, to September 14, 2024 - Chairman of the Board of the Russian Movement of Children and Youth.

Associate Professor of the Department of State and Municipal Management at the State University of Management (Moscow).

Since September 14, 2024 - Head of the Federal Agency for Youth Affairs.

=== Awards ===
He was awarded the Order of Honor (2024), the medal of the Order of Merit for the Fatherland, II degree (2020). He was awarded the gratitude of the President of the Russian Federation (2019).
