= Patriotic hacking =

Computer hacking targeting a state enemy

Patriotic hacking is a term for computer hacking in which citizens or supporters of a country attempt to perpetrate attacks on, or block attacks by, perceived enemies of the state.

== Examples ==
At the onset of the War in Iraq in 2003, the FBI was concerned about the increase in hack attacks as the intensity of the conflict grew. "The FBI said that recent experience showed that an increase in international tension was mirrored in the online world with a rise in cyber activity such as web defacements and denial of service attacks," according to the BBC.

Indian hackers in 2015 took down thousands of Pakistani websites including pakistan.gov.pk and Right To Information Pakistan under the attack named as #OPvijaya under the leadership of In73ct0r d3vil. This attack is considered to be a patriotic move by Indian hackers. Government of India and India's NSA Ajit Dhoval showed support to the attack on his Twitter account.

The official websites of 10 different Indian universities were hacked and defaced in 2017. A group going by the name of ‘Pakistan Haxor Crew’ (PFC) claimed responsibility for the breach, saying it was retaliation for Pakistan’s railway ministry website being hacked by an Indian crew few days before this breach.

== See also ==
- Black hat hacker
- Cyber espionage
- Cyberterrorism
- Cyberwarfare
- Hacker culture
- Hacker ethic
- Hacktivism
- Internet vigilantism
