= Putin's rynda =

Internet meme

Putin's rynda (Russian: рында Путина) is an internet meme which refers to a LiveJournal user post, picked up by the radio station Echo of Moscow, and forwarded to the Prime Minister of Russia Vladimir Putin. The post, written on August 1, 2010, with obscene words by the Russian user top-lap, who introduced himself as Alexander, criticised the fire safety condition in his native village during the 2010 Russian wildfires and emphasized the disappearance of the village's old fire alarm bell, which top-lap called "rynda" (a ship's bell in Russian). Top-lap asked to support his appeal, directed to the authorities of Kalyazinsky District in Russia's Tver Oblast. The post was spotted by the Echo of Moscow's editor-in-chief Alexei Venediktov on August 1. According to Venediktov, he "saw that this message contains not only a money request or criticism of authorities, but a proposal to organize a voluntary fire guard if discounts are offered" and "it appeared as something new" to him. Venediktov forwarded the post with his accompanying commentary on August 2. Putin's reply was e-mailed two days later. The rynda was ultimately installed, although top-lap claimed he was visited by the authorities who took his USB flash drives and hard drive, that reportedly stored nothing but video games.

In August, 2010 the question "what is rynda" became the top query on Yandex search engine, briefly surpassing the query "love". Putin's rynda also became a subject of political cartoons and is mentioned on the November page of the erotic calendar Happy Birthday, Mr. Putin!

== Background ==
During the 2010 Russian wildfires local officials were accused of taking inadequate measures to prevent fires and respond effectively. A state of emergency was declared near about 500 towns and villages. The then Russian Minister of Emergency Situations Sergey Shoygu outlined a lack of volunteer firefighting units and poor enforcement of safety rules at dachas. According to him, there were also 24,000 remote villages beyond the reach of fire engines. The United States dispatched an estimated $4.5 million worth of firefighting equipment and other supplies to help battle the wildfires in Russia.

While the Russian government called the wildfires a natural disaster that appears every 30 or 40 years, Putin in his reply to top-lap noted that "Russia did not experience such high temperatures for the last 140 years".

== Original abridged post ==
External image
- Page from Happy Birthday, Mr. Putin!, referring to Putin's rynda

Do you know why we're burning? Because it's a fuck-up. [...] In [my] village under douchebag communists – who are being denounced by everyone now – there were three fire ponds, rynda that people would ring in case of fire and – oh, miracle – fire truck, one for three villages, but at least there was a fire truck. And then misters democrats came and that's when a fuck-up started. They leveled the fire ponds with the ground and sold that ground for construction projects. They did something to the fire truck, maybe aliens fucking stole it, and the rynda was replaced (modernization, damn it) with a telephone that doesn't fucking work because they forgot to connect it to the line. A firefighter stayed but he doesn't have anything except a helmet and robe left after the same bad communists. [...] I have a question. Where does our money go? Why every year we slide further and further toward a primitive society? Why do we fucking need some innovative center in Skolkovo if we don't have simple fire trucks? Why before we had such people as foresters who would warn firefighters about fires and didn't allow those fires to affect villages? I don't want a telephone in the village, I want fire ponds and my rynda back, give me my rynda, damn it, and dig me a pond, I'll take care of it myself and will fill it with water if a local administration doesn't want to do it. Just give me a place.
