= Kristina Potupchik =

Russian blogger (born 1986)

- Кристина Потупчик
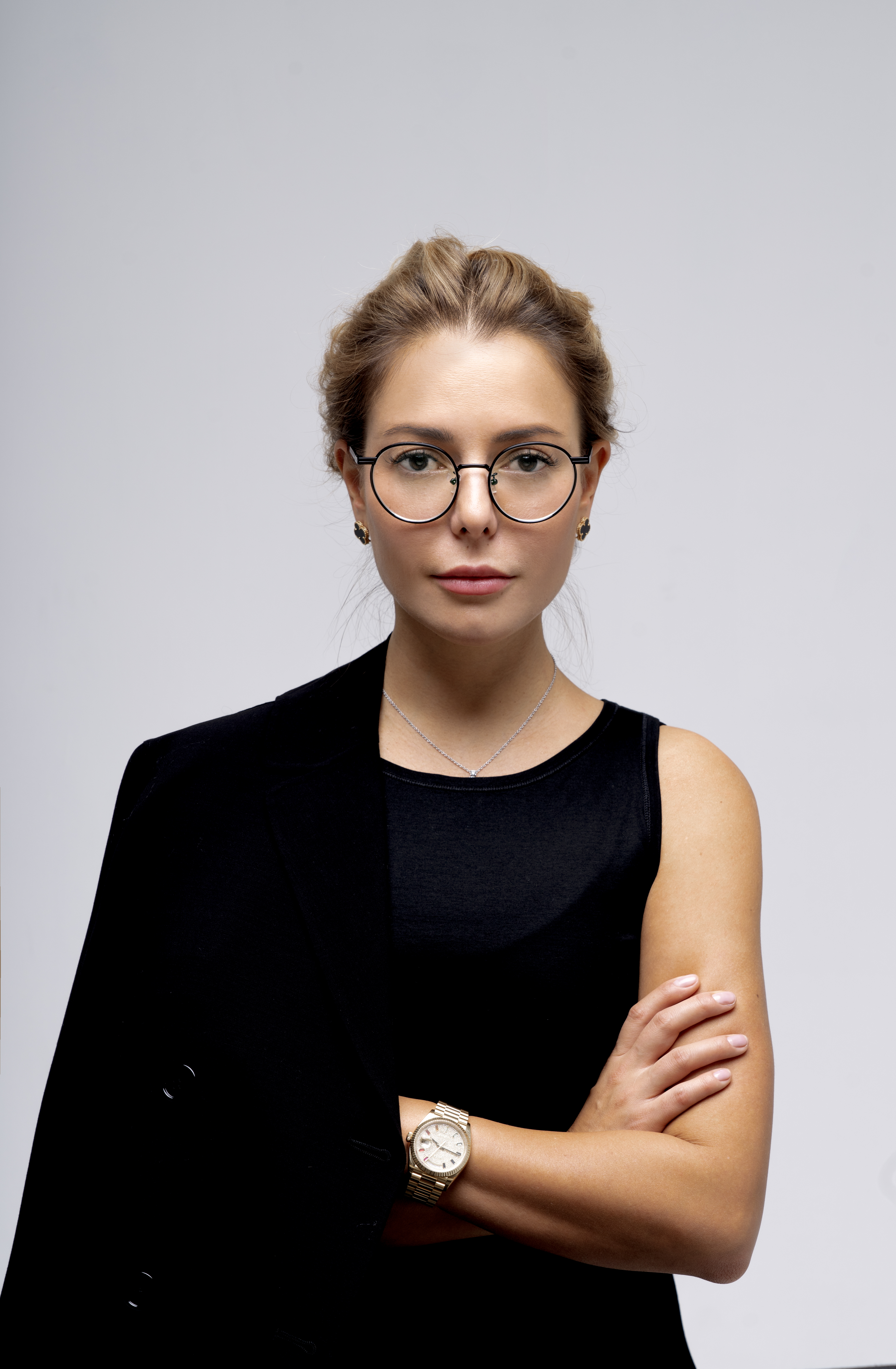
- Potupchik in 2017
- Born: 19 January 1986 (age 39); Murom, USSR
- Occupation(s): Blogger; Spokesperson, Nashi

Kristina Andreyevna Potupchik (Russian: Кристи́на Андре́евна Поту́пчик; born 19 January 1986) is a popular Russian blogger, a public figure, and the head of the Foundation for the Open New Democracy (FOND), engaged in the support of non-profit social projects across the Internet.

She was a Komissar of pro-Putin Nashi youth movement, then their spokeswoman (2007–2012), and then a spokeswoman for the Federal Agency for Youth Affairs (2007–2010). From 31 May 2004, she is a member Civic Chamber of the Russian Federation 5th composition.

== See also ==
- Happy Birthday, Mr. Putin!
