= Nashi (political movement) =

Russian political movement

Nashi (Russian: Наши, meaning "Ours") was a political movement initiated by well-known Russian journalist Alexander Nevzorov. The movement has been described as "statist-chauvinist". The Nashi youth movement in Russia is not related to Nevzorov's movement.

With Russia experiencing political and economic crisis amid the dissolution of the Soviet Union in November 1991, Nevzorov established the People's Liberation Movement "Nashi", which he defined as "a united front of resistance to the anti-national politics of the current administration of Russia and other Union Republics of the former USSR". Its badge contained the contour of the USSR with the words "НАШИ" (Ours) within. One of the prominent participants in the movement was Viktor Alksnis. The organisation was based in Leningrad (later Saint Petersburg), where Nevzorov hosted the scandalous television broadcast 600 Seconds. Nashi militants maintained a presence on Leningrad's streets. The movement called for a restoration of the Soviet Union and opposed what they saw as Russia's enemies in the West and their collaborators in Russia. Its positions were similar to Zhirinovsky's Liberal Democratic Party of the Soviet Union and the more "right-wing" groups of the National Salvation Front. The members of Nashi were sometimes called nashists, a pun based on similarity with the word "fascists". In 2015, during an interview with Echo of Moscow, Nevzorov acknowledged that he was indeed a fascist during the early 1990s when he founded Nashi but was not since then due to his disillusionment with the First Chechen War which he initially supported when it started in 1994, as the war and body count dragged on, he rejected the fascist mentality that led him to promote it. In Nevzorov's own words "I experimented with fascism in the laboratory, soft forms. I don't have to spend my whole life following ideas whose delusion has become obvious to me".

== See also ==
- Liberal Democratic Party of Russia
- Russian All-People's Union
