= Nizhny Novgorod International Model UN =

United Nations competition in Nizhny Novgorod, Russia

The Nizhny Novgorod International Model United Nations (abbreviated NNovIMUN) (Russian: Нижегородская Международная Модель ООН) is a model United Nations that has been held by the Faculty of International Relations at N. I. Lobachevsky State University of Nizhny Novgorod (abbreviated NNSU) since 2007. More than 130 students per year take part in it, being citizens either of foreign countries or different regions of Russia. Since 2010, the Nizhny Novgorod School Model United Nations (abbreviated NNovSMUN) has been realized under the framework of the NNovIMUN.

== Description ==
The Nizhny Novgorod International Model United Nations is a political roleplay which accurately reproduces the work of the UN bodies. The Model covers problems similar to issues which are under consideration of the UN. This provides acknowledgement of how decisions are taken at the highest international level. Traditionally, the NNovIMUN takes place in the middle of March and lasts either for 4 or 5 days. There are several languages used during sessions. Furthermore, there are cultural events prepared for each session day except for the only one which is completely devoted to the work of committees. In 2010, the Nizhny Novgorod Model United Nations was assigned the status of an international one. Several UN bodies had different official languages for the first time: 1. The United Nations Human Rights Council (Russian) 2. The United Nations Security Council (English) 3. The International Court of Justice (French) NNovIMUN’s participants study the most burning urgent agendum of the UN. Final projects of resolutions are sent to the UN News Centre in Moscow.

== Secretariat ==
NNovIMUN Secretariat is annually formed in September. Everyone who has had an experience of being a delegate in the Model United Nations is allowed to be a Secretariat member, including both students of the Faculty of International Relations at NNSU and representatives of other universities and countries.

NNovIMUN	Secretary-General	Deputy Secretary-General for Organizational Issues
2010	Galina Simanovskaya	Yulia Murzina
2011	Galina Simanovskaya	Yulia Murzina
2012	Aleksandr Lombrozo	Natalia Ostarova
2013	Maria Zakharova	Bogdan Kopasovskiy

== Delegates ==
By 2012, the NNovIMUN had connected participants from many Russian cities and foreign countries, which made these students face the challenge of arranging the international dialogue and reaching compromises in issues of international importance. Representatives of

- Russian cities (Moscow, Kazan, Yaroslavl, Voronezh, Izhevsk, Chita);
- distant countries and the Russian near-abroad (Belarus, Latvia, Germany, Austria, Hungary, the USA, the PRC, Ivory Coast and Ghana)

were discussing agendum in committees, taking part in cultural events and competing for the title of the best delegate during those 4 days.

=== The best delegate ===
Traditionally, two best delegates of committees are elected at the end of the NNovIMUN session via secret ballot. One winner is assigned by a presidium of a committee. The other one is chosen straight by other delegates. Results of an election are based on the following criteria:

- an ability to champion economical, geopolitical etc. interests of a country;
- delegate’s activity in formal and informal debates;
- session attendance.

If a delegate does not take part in committee’s work for 2 days or more, his/her certificate of a participant is deprived.

== Organizers ==
The NNovIMUN is held by the Faculty of International Relations at NNSU. The Model’s main organizers are students of the faculty. Ideological inspirers are Svetlana Anatolyevna Kolobova and Oleg Alekseyevich Kolobov, who is a creator and a dean (2002-2012) of the Faculty of International Relations. Broadening and improving, the NNovIMUN has managed to enlist the support of the UN News Centre in Russia, Moscow State Institute of International Relations, the office of Ministry of Foreign Affairs of the Russian Federation in Nizhny Novgorod, the UN Assistance Fund in Nizhny Novgorod and the Nizhny Novgorod Administration.

== Cultural events ==
Cultural events are prepared by the NNovIMUN every year, which gives participants an opportunity to try team building, take part in the multicultural festival “Global Village” and visit other significant events in Nizhny Novgorod. The “Global Village” has been held within the frameworks of the NNovIMUN since 2012. The idea consists in original presentation of a region or a country by delegates.

The informal NNovIMUN session closing takes place in one of the Nizhny Novgorod clubs.
