= Russian annexation of Crimea =

Russian annexation of Crimea may refer to:

- 1783 Russian annexation of Crimea
- 2014 Russian annexation of Crimea

== See also ==
- Transfer of Crimea to Ukraine (1954)
