= Federal Agency for Youth Affairs =

Federal agency in Russia

- Федеральное агентство по делам молодёжи (Росмолодёжь)
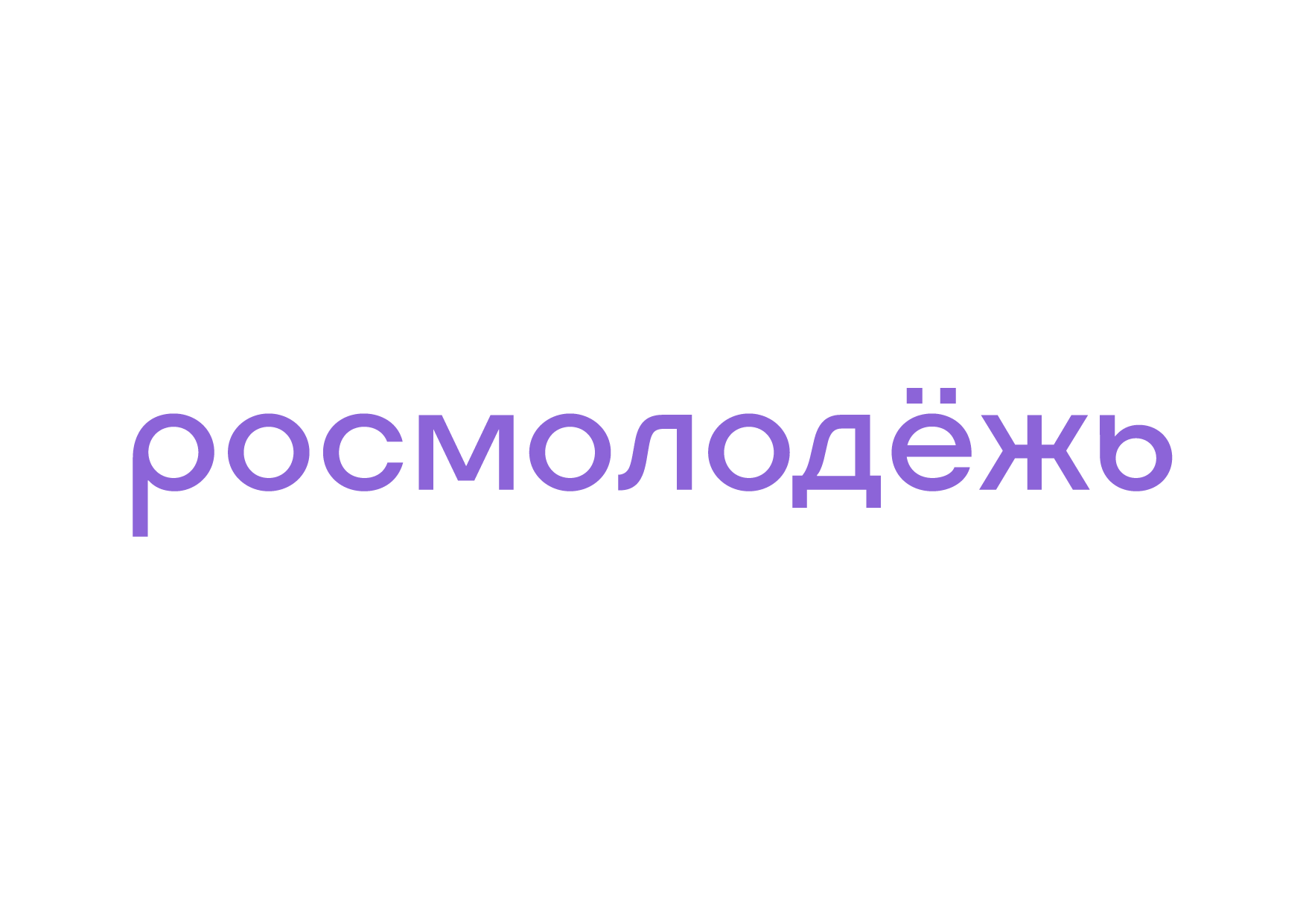
- Emblem of the Federal Service for Youth Affairs

Agency overview
- Formed: 2008
- Headquarters: Moscow, Bolshoy Trekhsvyatitelsky lane, 2/1s2
- Agency executive: Grigory Gurov
- Website: Fadm.gov.ru

The Federal Agency for Youth Affairs (Rosmolodyozh; Russian: Федеральное агентство по делам молодёжи (Росмолодёжь), romanized: Federal'naya agentstvo po delam molodyozhi) is a federal agency executive power in Russia, performing functions for the provision of public services and management of state property in the field of youth policy, implementation, in cooperation with public organizations and movements representing the interests of young people, activities aimed at ensuring a healthy lifestyle for young people, moral and patriotic education and the realization by young people of their professional opportunities.

It was formed in 2008 as an independent agency and is subordinated directly to the government of Russia.

== Head ==
- Vasily Yakemenko — 2008—2012
- Sergei Belokonev — 2012—2014
- Sergei Pospelov — 2014—2016
- Alexei Palamarchuk — 7 October 2016 - 21 March 2017
- Aleksandr Bugayev — 21 March 2017 — 16 May 2021
- Ksenia Razuvayeva — 17 May 2021 — 14 August 2024
- Denis Ashirov — 14 August — 14 September 2024 (acting)
- Grigory Gurov — 14 September 2024 — incumbent
