= National Russian Liberation Movement =

National Russian Liberation Movement Национальное русское освободительное движение
- Abbreviation: NAROD
- Co-chairmen: Sergei Gulyaev; Alexei Navalny; Zakhar Prilepin
- Political Council Chairman: Andrei Dmitriev
- Executive Committee Chairman: Peter Miloserdov
- Founded: 23 June 2007
- Dissolved: 2011 (de facto)
- Ideology: Russian nationalism; National democracy; Anti-immigration
- Political position: Right-wing

Website
- rusnarod.info (archived)

The National Russian Liberation Movement (Russian: Национальное русское освободительное движение, romanized: Natsional'noye russkoye osvoboditel'noye dvizheniye; NAROD lit. 'PEOPLE') was a Russian nationalist political movement that existed in Russia from 2007 to 2011. The movement defined itself as "the first democratic nationalist movement in the modern history of Russia."

The co-founders of the movement were Alexei Navalny, Zakhar Prilepin, journalist Sergei Gulyaev and many others.

== History ==
The idea of the movement was born by the journalist Sergei Gulyaev after the "Dissenters' March" held on April 15 in Saint Petersburg. In his opinion, NAROD will be a supra-party network structure, "uniting people of various views - from the left to the right flank, but without the extreme "shiza". The movement has two main goals: "national revival" and "fight against the ruling regime and kleptocracy".

The founding conference of the movement took place on 23–24 June 2007. Alexei Navalny, deputy chairman of the Moscow branch of the Yabloko party, National Bolshevik writer Zakhar Prilepin and journalist Sergei Gulyaev were elected co-chairs of the movement. Another National Bolshevik, Andrei Dmitriev, co-coordinator of The Other Russia coalition in Saint Petersburg, became the chairman of the political council, and the communist Petr Miloserdov became the chairman of the executive committee.

Subsequently, Navalny was expelled from Yabloko for "promoting nationalist ideas".

On June 25, 2007, the Manifesto of the movement was published with 11 signatures: Sergei Gulyaev, Alexei Navalny, Vladimir Golyshev (editor-in-chief of the NaZlobu.ru website), Pyotr Miloserdov, Andrey Dmitriev, editor-in-chief of Limonka Alexei Volynets, Zakhar Prilepin, Pavel Svyatenkov, Igor Romankov, Mikhail Dorozhkin and Evgeny Pavlenko. It was supposed to join the NAROD movement to The Other Russia coalition, but this did not happen.

In 2008, the creation of the "Russian National Movement" was announced, which included the organizations Movement Against Illegal Immigration, Great Russia and NAROD. The co-chairman of the NAROD movement, Alexei Navalny, promised that the new association would participate in the next elections to the State Duma and had a chance to win. He noted: “I think such an association will receive a fairly large percentage of votes and will claim victory ... Up to 60 percent of the population adheres to spontaneous nationalism, but it is not politically formalized in any way”.

In June 2008, at the joint conference "New Political Nationalism", Movement Against Illegal Immigration and the "People" movement signed an agreement on cooperation (information exchange, coordination of activities, monitoring of manifestations of Russophobia). Navalny said that the "new political nationalism" is a democratic movement, in which it will give "a hundred points ahead of the note liberals".

As of 2011, the movement ceased to exist.
