= Limonka =

Limonka, a Russian word meaning "little lemon", may refer to:

- F1 grenade (Russia), nicknamed limonka
- Limonka (newspaper), a National Bolshevik Party newspaper founded by Eduard Limonov
- Limonka (postage stamp), a 1925 Russian notable postage stamp

Limonka is also a Polish word for "Lime" (fruit).
