= The Other Russia of E. V. Limonov =

Unregistered National Bolshevik political party in Russia

The Other Russia of E. V. Limonov Другая Россия Э. В. Лимонова
- Abbreviation: DR, Nazbols
- Spokesperson: Aleksandr Averin
- Leaders: Andrei Dmitriyev; Nikolay Avdyushenkov; Mikhail Aksel; Kilill Imashev; Alexander Kamensky; Dmitiry Sidorenko; Andrey Skovorodnikov; Yuri Staroverov; Olga Shalina
- Founder: Eduard Limonov
- Founded: 10 July 2010; 16 years ago (as The Other Russia)
- Preceded by: National Bolshevik Party; The Other Russia
- Headquarters: Moscow, Russia
- Newspaper: Total Mobilization; Limonka (until July 2010)
- Armed wing: Interbrigades
- Membership: 52,000 (claimed)
- Ideology: National Bolshevism; Russian nationalism; Pan-Rusism; Neo-Sovietism; Russian irredentism; Anti-Western sentiment; Soviet patriotism; Civil libertarianism
- Political position: Syncretic
- National affiliation: Club of Angry Patriots
- Colors: Red Black
- Slogan: "Nation! Homeland! Socialism!" (Russian: "Нация! Родина! Социализм!"); "Yes, Death!" (Russian: "Да, Смерть!"); "Russia Is Everything! The Rest Is Nothing!" (Russian: "Россия — всё! Остальное — ничто!")
- Anthem: NBP Anthem

Party flag

Website
- drugoros.ru

The Other Russia of E. V. Limonov (Russian: Другая Россия Э. В. Лимонова, romanized: Drugáya Rossíya E. V. Limónova), formerly The Other Russia (Russian: Другая Россия, romanized: Drugáya Rossíya), is an unregistered National Bolshevik political party in Russia, founded in July 2010 by Eduard Limonov. The Other Russia was reorganized in September 2020 and changed its name to "The Other Russia of E. V. Limonov", in honor of their deceased founder who died the same year. Its members are known as Nazbols (Russian: нацболы). As a Russian political party adopting syncretic politics, it has been variously called far-left and far-right by the likes of Malaysia's The Sun, France's Le Point, and BFM TV, Belgium's RTBF, and Eurasia Daily Monitor and the Czech Republic's Expactz.cz, respectively. The armed wing of the party, the Interbrigades, is active in the war in Donbass.

== History ==
=== Origins ===
The party has its origins in the National Bolshevik Party, a Russian political party founded in 1993 primarliy by Eduard Limonov and Aleksandr Dugin. The party, known for its countercultural aesthetics, unusual political protests and provocations and shock-value imagery (notably using a Nazi Germany-style flag with a Hammer and sickle replacing the Swastika), was banned in Russia by the Moscow City Court in April of 2007, and the decision was upheld by the Supreme Court of Russia in August of 2007. Prior to this, the NBP's newspaper Limonka was banned in 2002 for "promoting extremism and calling on overthrowing the constitutional order".

=== Founding ===
On July 10, 2010, the party's founding congress took place at the Izmailovo Hotel in Moscow. 150 delegates from 50 Russian regions were at the congress, all of whom were accepted as party members. Eduard Limonov was elected as the party's chairman after a vote in which he was the only candidate. During the congress, several members of the Nashi youth movement held signs with arrows pointing to the hotel's entrance with text reading "Founding Congress of the Fascist Party".

On 21 January 2011, The Other Russia was denied registration by the Federal Registration Service because they did not have enough popular support among the Russian people.

=== Activity ===
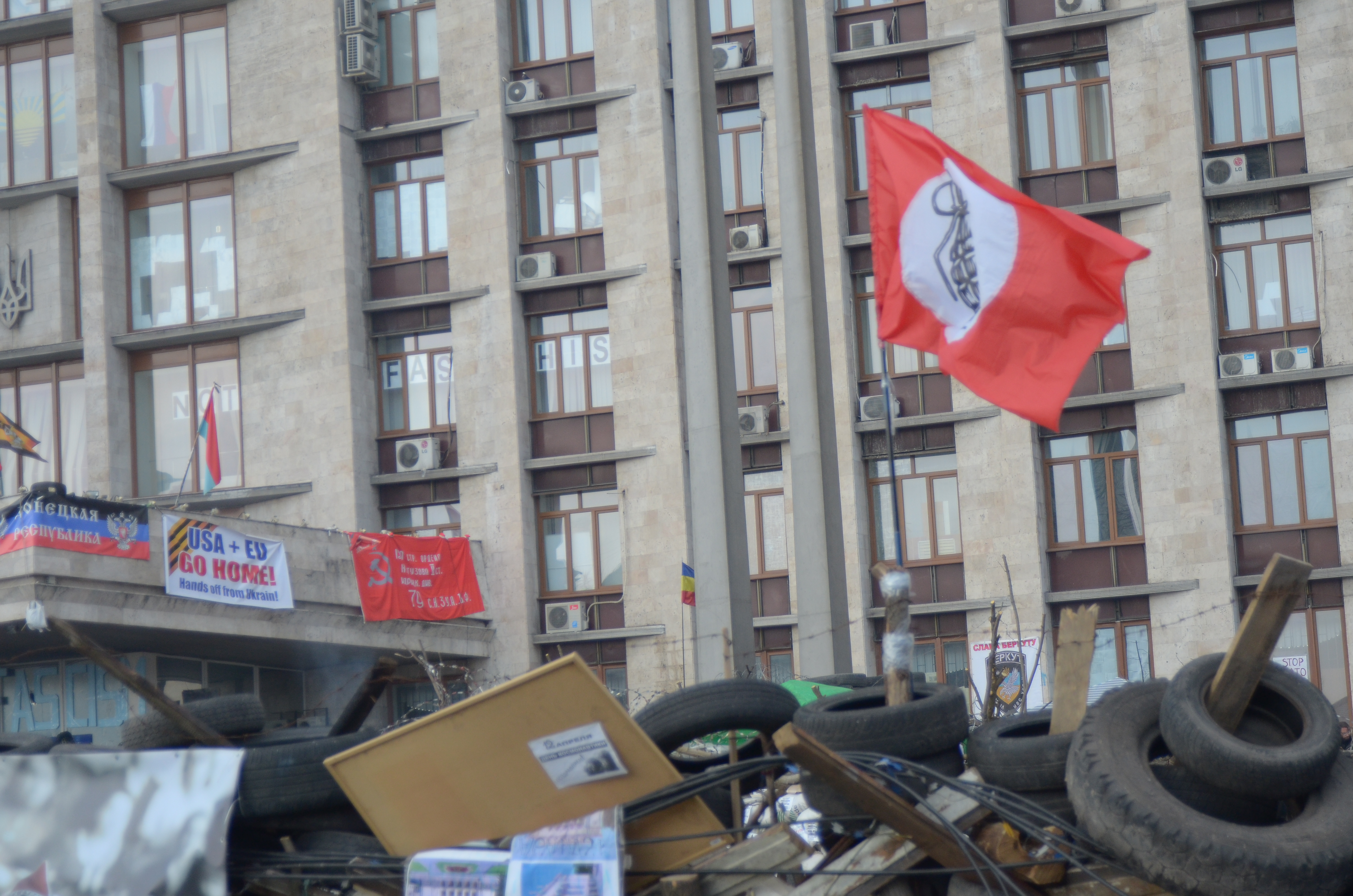
Party flag of The Other Russia in Donetsk, Ukraine during pro-Russian unrest in April 2014

Three members of the party were arrested and beaten for their role in the 2010 Manezhnaya Square riot trials. These arrests were flagged by human rights organizations as politically motivated by the members' involvement in The Other Russia.

National Bolsheviks and members of The Other Russia participated in the 2014 pro-Russian unrest in Ukraine. Members of the party formed armed troops Interbrigades and two members of The Other Russia were killed during the war in Donbas. According to Zakhar Prilepin, the Interbrigades assigned up to 2,000 fighters to the separatists in Donetsk and Luhansk.

On 6 November 2017, several of the party's activists were arrested in Saint Petersburg for unauthorized protest as they commemorated the Bolshevik Revolution centenary.

On 7 February 2018, Kirill Ananiev, a veteran member of the banned National Bolshevik Party and The Other Russia, was killed in the air strikes during the Battle of Khasham.

On 22 September 2018, a special congress of The Other Russia party was held in Moscow, during which Eduard Limonov and other leaders gave speeches. The congress was attended by delegates from regional branches of the party. Beness Aijo participated as representative of the Russian people's militias in Ukraine.

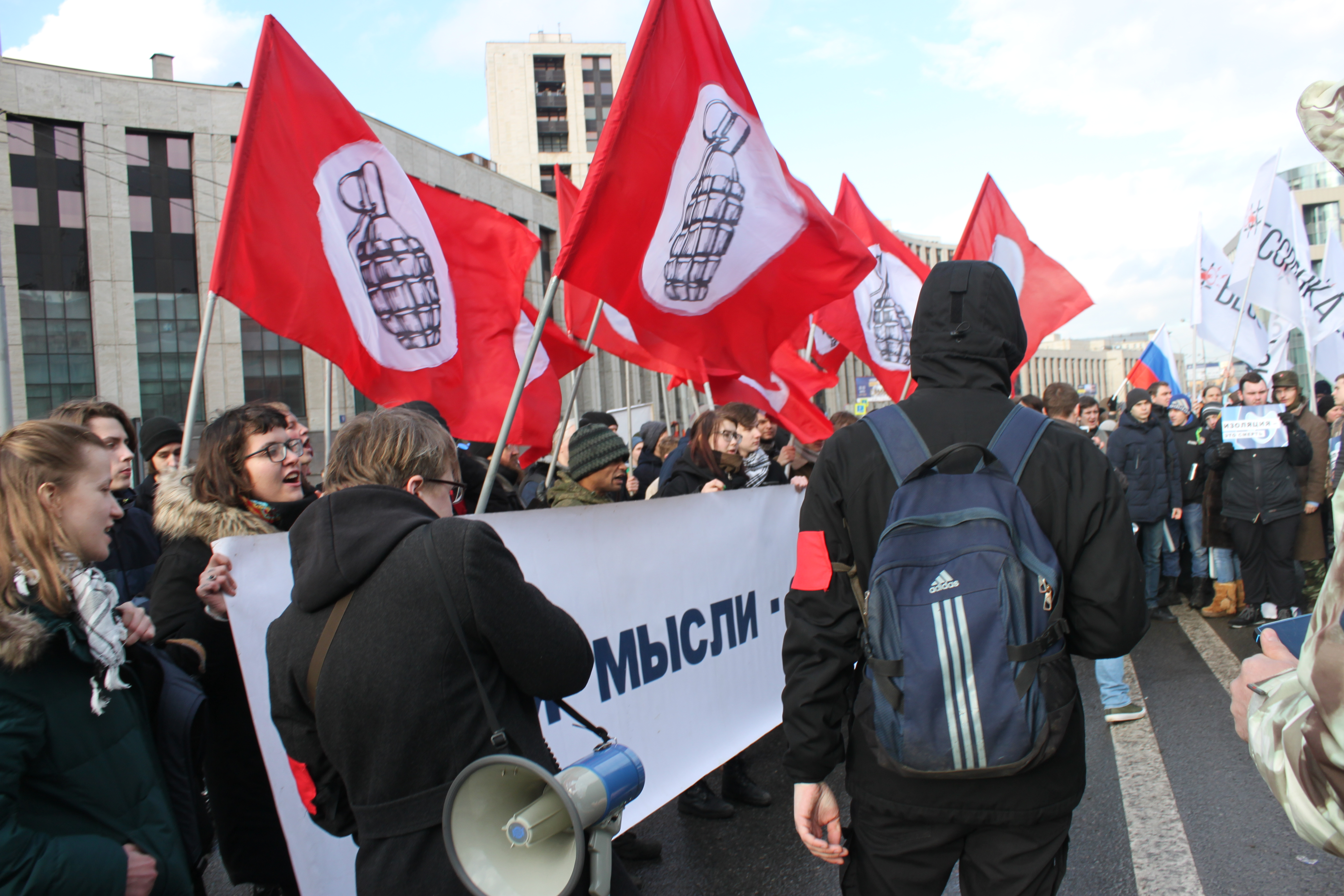
OR-Activists protesting the isolation of Runet in March 2019

During the International Security Exhibition in Moscow on 26 October 2018, The Other Russia activist Olga Shalina cut her veins in an act of symbolic protest against the violation of human rights in Russia and in the Russian penitentiary system. Shalina spoke about conditions in Russian prisons and spread leaflets criticizing police, shouting "Freedom for prisoners!"

Limonov died on 17 March 2020 in Moscow. In September 2020, The Other Russia was re-organized and the party's name was changed to "The Other Russia of E. V. Limonov", to honor their deceased founder.

During the Second Nagorno-Karabakh War in late 2020, The Other Russia demanded the recognition of the separatist Republic of Artsakh and party members participated on the side of Artsakh and the Armenians.

In May 2023, the party was active in organizing meetings and press conferences for the Club of Angry Patriots. The party actively opposes the arrest of Igor Girkin, a Russian army veteran, former FSB officer, and militant leader who most notably led a group of armed Russian militants who seized the city of Sloviansk in the Donbas region of Ukraine.

On 3 December 2023, party activist and veteran of the Russo-Ukrainian war Kirill Imashev poured ryazhenka on former Nashi chairman Vasily Yakemenko in retaliation of claims Yakemenko made in a tell-all interview in January of that year. A few months prior, Yakemenko's brother Boris, a columnist for Solovyov Live, had been assaulted by party activist Mikhail Galyashkin with kefir for his brother's revelations in the interview. Galyashkin was investigated by Centre E and detained for seven days.

On 8 October 2025, four members were arrested while protesting in front of the Central Bank. They received sentences of up to 20 days.

In December 2025, party members participated in protests against the banning of Roblox in Russia. Two members were detained for showing the emblem of the party, even though the party's symbols are not prohibited by law. On 12 February 2026, three members of the party were arrested and sentenced to 15 days in prison for setting up a barricade to block the entrance to the Roskomnadzor headquarters in Moscow to protest internet censorship and the slowing down of Telegram.

In January 2026, multiple party members were arrested at a Limonov reading circle in Krasnodar and sentenced to up to 10 days in prison due to the supposed displaying of extremist symbols. According to the party, the members were held at unknown places and showed sings of torture, and one detained woman allegedly developed gangrene due to the refusal of medication.

== Notable members ==
- Eduard Limonov (died 2020)
- Andrei Dmitriev
- Beness Aijo
- Aleksandr Averin

== See also ==
- National Bolshevik Party
- Popular Resistance Association
- National Bolshevism
- The Other Russia (coalition)
- Strategy-31
- Russo-Ukrainian War
