= Sankya (novel) =

2006 novel by Zakhar Prilepin

- First edition (Russian)
- Author: Zakhar Prilepin
- Original title: Санькя
- Translator: Mariya Gusev, Jeff Parker
- Language: Russian
- Series: Revolution
- Publisher: Ad Marginem
- Publication date: 2006
- Publication place: Russia
- English publication date: 2014
- Pages: 368
- ISBN: 978-5-91103-078-0

Sankya (Russian: Санькя) is a 2006 novel by the Russian writer Zakhar Prilepin. It is based on the author's experiences in the National Bolshevik Party.

== Synopsis ==
The protagonist is Sasha Tishin (nicknamed Sankya), a young member of the militarized far left political organization active in modern Russia. Their leader Kostenko is obviously patterned after Eduard Limonov, né Savenko.

Sasha becomes a defendant in a criminal case after a protest in Moscow is dispersed. Hiding from persecution, he flees to his native village, where he encounters the dying world of the Russian countryside. He fails to overcome his loneliness or to establish a connection with the past: his grandfather dies, and his grandmother does not see in him the continuation of her deceased son. The atmosphere of decay and silence forces him to reflect on his roots, family, and his own place in life.

Upon returning to the city, Sasha plunges into underground life with his party comrades. His inner search collides with harsh reality: the organization, which proclaims lofty ideals of struggle against an unjust state, in practice turns out to be a community of restless youth, trapped in a closed circle of struggle and unable to offer a clear direction for the future. In his ideological disputes with the liberal Bezletov, the self-contained nature of protest is revealed — protest that is, in reality, circular and leads to no meaningful change.

Despite doubts about the chosen path, Sasha is drawn ever deeper into the vortex of violence. He takes part in preparing a provocative action in Latvia, is arrested and beaten, and after release commits a series of desperate and destructive acts himself (such as robbery). He is swept into the cycle of violence almost mechanically — through his sense of protest and his longing for brotherhood.

The culmination comes with the desperate seizure of an administrative building, intended as part of a nationwide uprising by Kostenko's movement. Besieged and realizing the inevitability of a tragic end, Sasha and his comrades, driven by despair and a sense of hopelessness, prepare for their final battle, never having found an answer to the central question — what exactly they are sacrificing their lives for.

== Awards ==
- Evrika-Prize (2006)
- Yasnaya Polyana Award (2007)

== Translations and adaptations ==
Sankya has been translated into Chinese, Polish, French, Serbian, Romanian, Italian, German, Hungarian, Danish, English and Greek.

Kirill Serebrennikov's stage version of the novel was given the Golden Mask award in 2012.
