= Shchapov =

Shchapov (Russian: Щапов) is a Russian masculine surname, its feminine counterpart is Shchapova. Notable people with the surname include:

- Afanasy Shchapov (1830–1876), Russian historian
- Mikhail Shchapov (born 1975), Russian politician
- Yelena Shchapova (born 1950), Russian model, writer, and poet
