= The Revolution That Wasn't =

2008 film directed by Alyona Polunina

- Directed by: Alyona Polunina
- Written by: Alyona Polunina
- Produced by: Jaak Kilmi
- Starring: Anatoliy Tishin; Grigori Tishin; Eduard Limonov; Andrei Dmitriev
- Cinematography: Dmitri Rakov
- Release date: 25 September 2008
- Running time: 97 minutes
- Countries: Russia, Finland, Estonia
- Language: Russian

The Revolution That Wasn't (Russian: Революция, которой не было, Finnish: Vallankumous, jota ei tullut, Estonian: Revolutsioon, mida ei olnud) is a 2008 documentary film by Russian filmmaker Alyona Polunina, on the National Bolshevik Party and the Dissenters' March.

== Content ==
The documentary shows the way of life of some Russian national-bolsheviks. Young man Grigori Tishin is released from prison. Grigori spent several years in prison for participating in a direct action. He was among a group of national-bolsheviks who were staging an occupation of the Ministry of Health headquarters. After being released Grigori meets his father Anatoliy, who was in the past one of the National Bolshevik Party leaders. Anatoliy is disappointed in politics. At a party meeting, members of the NBP greet Grigori like a hero. After many years of political activity, Eduard Limonov becomes one of the leaders of Russian opposition. Anatoliy chooses religious life and becomes the helper of a priest in Orthodox church in Saint Petersburg. Andrei Dmitriev, leader of branch of the party in Saint Petersburg, still believe in the possibility of the revolution. Grigori becomes Limonov's personal bodyguard. Activists participate in Dissenters' March. But the opposition activity in the country becomes harder than they expected. National-bolsheviks participate in the funeral of their comrade Yuriy Chervochkin, who was murdered by unknown perpetrators.

== Cast ==
- Anatoliy Tishin
- Grigori Tishin
- Eduard Limonov
- Andrei Dmitriev

== Awards ==
- 2009 - Lavrovaya Vetv

== See also ==
- Da, smert (2004) – short documentary, by Alyona Polunina
