= Pathology (disambiguation) =

Pathology is a medical field specializing in the categorization of diseases. Pathological is the adjective form of the term.

Pathology may also refer to:

== In science ==
- Anatomic pathology, the study of macro and microscopic abnormalities in tissues and cells.
- Clinical pathology, medical specialty that is concerned with the diagnosis of disease based on the laboratory analysis of bodily fluids, such as blood, urine

- AP/CP stands for combined anatomical and clinical pathology.

- Pathological (mathematics), any mathematical phenomenon considered atypically bad or counterintuitive
- Pathological science, a process by which the scientific process is distorted through wishful thinking or subjective bias
- Phytopathology, the study of abnormalities in plants
- Psychopathology, any illness of the mind
- Speech pathology, the area of rehabilitative medicine that treats of speech or swallowing impediments

== Arts and works ==
- Pathology (band), a death metal band
- Pathologic, a 2005 video game
- Pathology (film), a 2008 film
- The Pathologies (Russian: Патологии), a 2005 Russian novel by Zakhar Prilepin
