= Aleksandr Averin (publicist) =

Russian politician and journalist (born 1981)

- Александр Аверин
- Born: 13 January 1981 (age 45); Moscow, Russian SFSR, Soviet Union
- Education: Moscow Institute of Steel and Alloys
- Occupations: Politician; publicist
- Known for: Political activism
- Political party: National Bolshevik Party; The Other Russia
- Movement: Non-system opposition

Aleksandr Alexandrovich Averin (Russian: Александр Александрович Аверин; born 13 January 1981) is a Russian political dissident and publicist. He works as journalist.

== Biography ==
=== Political career ===
Aleksandr Averin was born in Moscow. He studied at the Moscow Institute of Steel and Alloys. Averin has been a member of the National Bolshevik Party since 1999. Averin has been Eduard Limonov's official press secretary since 2002. In 2006, Averin co-founded the coalition The Other Russia. In 2006, Aleksandr Averin was one of the organizers of the Dissenters' March in Moscow, during which he was repeatedly detained. In 2009, Averin was one of the organizers of the Strategy-31. Since 2010, Averin has been the spokesperson for the political party The Other Russia.

=== War in Donbas ===
During the Russo-Ukrainian War, Averin served in pro-Russian separatist forces.

=== Arrest ===
On 7 April 2018, Aleksandr Averin was arrested by Russian police on his return from Donbas. He was accused of disobedience to border guards and illegal possession of a weapon. He did not plead guilty. On 7 December 2018, Aleksandr Averin was sentenced to three years in prison. Political party "The Other Russia" recognized Averin as a political prisoner.
