= Aleksandr Lebedev-Frontov =

Russian painter, collagist, and musician (1960–2022)

Alexander Lebedev-Frontov Александр Лебедев-Фронтов
- Born: 26 August 1960; Leningrad, Russian SFSR, Soviet Union
- Died: 8 January 2022 (aged 61) Saint Petersburg, Russia
- Genres: noise, industrial, experimental music
- Occupations: painter, poet, musician
- Label: Ultra
- Formerly of: Линия Масс, Ветрофония, Веприсуицида, Пила, Стальной Пакт, Т. А.У., Мёртвые хиппи

Alexander Lebedev-Frontov (Russian: Александр Лебедев-Фронтов; 26 August 1960 – 8 January 2022) was a Russian painter, collagist, and musician.

== Life and career ==
Lebedev-Frontov was born on 26 August 1960 in Leningrad, USSR. He was one of the precursors of industrial and noise music in Soviet Russia. In 1987, he began an underground music project named Линия Масс (Mass Line). In 1994, he joined the National Bolshevik Party and started cooperation with the newspaper Limonka. In 1995, Lebedev-Frontov founded the record label Ultra that focused primarily on industrial music. In 1996, he created Vetrophonia. In 1997, Lebedev-Frontov re-created Линия Масс. In 1999 Lebedev-Frontov was co-founder of art-gallery GEZ21 (Галерея экспериментального звука). He died in Saint Petersburg on 8 January 2022, at the age of 61.

== Discography ==
=== Linija Mass ===
- 1998 — Fanatisch Eiskalt Maschine
- 2000 — Genus Ferrum
- 2001 — Eiserne Revolution
- 2002 — Pas D'Acier
- 2004 — Triumph Stalit
- 2007—1987
- 2007 — Trud /
- 2007 — Mechano-Faktura
- 2007 — Proletkult
- 2007 — Kinematika Mechanizmov

=== Veprisuicida ===
- 1996 — Веприсуицида
- 1999 — Veprisuicida / Cisfinitum — Heavy Metal Cyclothymia / Отклонение От Симметрии
- 1999 — Comforter / Veprisuicida
- 2000 — Chinese Meat
- 2000 — K2 / Veprisuicida
- 2001 — Veprisuicida & Organomehanizm — Collaboration
- 2003 — Vaginacentrism
- 2005 — Veprisuicida & Organomehanizm — Electro-Pop

=== Vetrophonia ===
- 1998 — Kuomintang
- 1999 — Risveglio Di Una Citta / Futurogrammatika
- Magmax / Vetrophonia
- 2000 — K2 / Vetrophonia
- 2000 — Strappadology
- 2001 — Symformoza
- 2003 — Simultaneous
- 2005 — Promzona
- 2005 — Shumographika
- 2008 — Generalissimus Chiang Kai-shek

=== Stalnoy Pakt ===
- 2002 — Decima Mas / Il Principe Nero
- 2002 — Okkupacija
- 2003 — Stalnoy Pakt / Rasthof Dachau — Die Toten An Die Lebenden
- 2004 — Russia's Awakening
- 2005 — Anno Mundi Ardentis # Legion Chesty
- 2006 — O Roma O Morte!
- 2007 — Stalnoy Pakt — Anthesteria — Mikhail Vavich — Dedicated To The Russo-Japanese War 1904—1905

=== Т.А.У. ===
- 2001 — Bioni
- 2007 — La Splendeur, Geometrique / Urbanomania
