= His Butler's Story =

1987 novel by Eduard Limonov

- Author: Eduard Limonov
- Original title: История его слуги
- Language: English
- Genre: autobiographical novel
- Publisher: Grove Press
- Publication date: 1987
- Publication place: United States
- Pages: 346
- ISBN: 0394556070

His Butler's Story (Russian: История его слуги) is a 1987 autobiographical novel by the Russian writer Eduard Limonov. It is about a Russian emigrant who works as a butler for a wealthy American in New York City, detesting both the Americans and the Soviet Union. It was published in English in 1987.

Publishers Weekly wrote that the book has "a certain coarse energy" but is dragged down by "rage and resentment, and a mean-spirited, petulant envy"
