= Memoir of a Russian Punk =

1983 novel by Eduard Limonov

- Author: Eduard Limonov
- Original title: Подросток Савенко
- Language: Russian
- Genre: autobiographical novel
- Publisher: Sintaksis
- Publication date: 1983
- Publication place: France
- English publication date: 1990
- Pages: 262

Memoir of a Russian Punk (Russian: Подросток Савенко, lit. 'Adolescent Savenko') is a 1983 autobiographical novel by the Russian writer Eduard Limonov.

== Plot ==
Interweaved with flashbacks, the story takes place in Kharkov in 1958, during the 41st anniversary of the October Revolution. Eddie is a 15-year-old boy who comes of age as he writes poetry and tries to rebel against a society he thinks is amoral. He is friends with a group of like-minded youths who occupy themselves by drinking, stealing and raping. Eddie loses his virginity, wins a poetry contest and participates in a robbery that goes wrong. His poetry saves him from a criminal career. Eventually, his friends end up in prison and one of them is executed, but Eddie moves to Europe.

== Reception ==
Kirkus Reviews wrote that the book "tries hard to shock but ends up being the story of your basic bright, sensitive boy who isn't quite cut out to be a monster of depravity, though he does try". Publishers Weekly wrote that "Limonov expertly captures the horrifying boredom of working-class Soviet urban life, and uses just the right hip, offhand tone to describe Eddie's adventures in the demi-world of teenage gangs and small-time hoods".
