= Da, smert =

- Directed by: Alyona Polunina
- Written by: Alyona Polunina
- Produced by: Alyona Polunina
- Cinematography: Alyona Polunina
- Release date: 4 October 2004
- Running time: 25 min.
- Country: Russia
- Language: Russian
- Budget: 10 000 RUB

Da, smert (Russian: Да, смерть; translated as Yes, death or Viva la Muerte) is a 2004 documentary film by Russian filmmaker Alyona Polunina.

Polunina's film became a finalist for the Laurel Award in the nomination "best debut".

== Content ==
The film shows national-bolsheviks who lived in squatted headquarter of NBP in Moscow.

== Cast ==
- Vladimir Linderman
- Eduard Limonov

== Critical response ==
Valery Kichin noted:

The film left a feeling of that vague danger that visits everyone at the sight of a pack of feral teenagers, you want to cross to the other side of the street. But how can an entire country cross over to the other side? These are teenagers now. But teenagers grow up.

According to Svetlana Tolmacheva (Radio Svoboda),

When starting the filming of the film, Alyona Polunina first of all wanted to understand for herself who and why came to the National Bolshevik Party, whose members, as you know, hold very radical views. Alyona Polunina has formed an opinion about them as idealists and incorrigible romantics. The director even felt a certain sympathy for her characters.
