= It's Me, Eddie =

1979 novel by Eduard Limonov

- Author: Eduard Limonov
- Original title: Это я — Эдичка
- Genre: Roman a clef
- Published: 1979
- Publication place: France

It's Me, Eddie (Russian: Это я — Эдичка, romanized: Eto ya — Edichka) is the first novel by Russian writer and politician Eduard Limonov. The novel was written in New York in 1976 and published in Paris in 1979. When it was first published in Russia in 1991, it sold over a million copies.

== Plot ==
The plot is fictional but based on real experiences Limonov faced during his immigration to New York City. The protagonist is a man named Eddichka, a Russian immigrant in New York City. His wife has just divorced him, and he is collecting welfare whilst working at a restaurant. Eddichka attends Trotskyist meetings. The text of the novel uses obscenities and naturalistic descriptions of explicit sexual scenes. Eddichka has a series of negative sexual experiences with women, but finds more fulfillment when he starts to have sex with men.

== Publishing history ==
The novel was repeatedly published in Russian, French, and English. The novel has been called "the quintessential novel of the third wave emigration".

== Reception ==
Zakhar Prilepin offered effusive praise to It's Me, Eddie, stating that this is "a genius book about human freedom, love, passion ... I was simply killed by it". Prominent writer Dmitry Bykov described it as a confessional and hysterical book, although The Diary of a Loser is the more important artistic achievement of Limonov (“even more poetry ... in some things more frank and subtle”). Joseph Brodsky, who composed the advertising text for the cover of the American edition, noted in private conversations that Limonov's confession is nothing new in the context of American literature.

The novel was mentioned in Adam Curtis's 2021 BBC documentary series Can't Get You Out of My Head.
