= Roblox ban protests in Russia =

2025 anti-video game ban protests

- Part of censorship and child safety on Roblox
- Date: 3 December 2025 − 10 June 2026
- Location: Russian Federation
- Goals: Lift the ban of Roblox in Russia, which includes returning the app
- Methods: Online activism; Protests
- Result: Protester victory; Ban on Roblox lifted by the Minkomsvyaz

Parties
Protesters; Roblox users; Rassvet; National Bolsheviks	Russian Government; Roskomnadzor; Minkomsvyaz; Police of Russia; Centre for Combating Extremism; (Russia) Anti-Roblox counter protestors

Lead figures
In Tomsk: Anton Isakov; Online: Decentralized	Vladimir Putin; Maksut Shadayev

Number
In Tomsk: ~50 protesters Online: ~63,000 protesters	Unknown

On 3 December 2025, the Russian federal communications regulator, Roskomnadzor, would state that they would implement a national ban in the Russian Federation on the U.S.-based online game platform and game creation system, Roblox. The Roskomnadzor authorities then cited concerns over content regulations on Roblox, several concerns that they cited include, how the platform hosted extremist content, facilitated the harassment of minors, terrorism, and violated laws regarding "LGBT propaganda".

After this statement was made from Roskomnadzor, a series of rare, coordinated, public demonstration, and digital campaigns, consisting mostly of children and teenagers occurred in Russia. With estimates had indicated approximately 18 million monthly active users on Roblox that were from Russia were affected during the national ban. Roblox was also tied in third place alongside TikTok of time usage amongst Russian children during early 2025. The protests were later reported by several news outlets as a factor of the lifting on 10 June 2026.

== Protests and public response ==
Following the ban, dissent materialized in the form of complaints sent directly to pro‑government "internet safety" politician Ekaterina Mizulina, with her reporting over 63,000 letters. Letters also reached Vladimir Putin's office. The messages sent to the Kremlin did not stop at criticizing the ban itself, but half of them stated that they wanted to leave Russia in the future because of the "suffocating" environment created by the government. Online protests also targeted Mizulina's social media accounts, with around 5,000 defying comments in some of her posts following the ban, some complaining of the financial damage of banning the platform due to the personal investment in in-platform purchases by some users.

On 14 December 2025, a physical protest was organized in the city of Tomsk despite refusal of local authorities to allow a protest in the city center, forcing the demonstration to occur in its outskirts. The protests participants were Roblox players and their parents, numbering up to 50 people. Reuters reported on the protest calling it "rare." During this protest, two National Bolshevik activists, Arseny Leoshko and Alexander Yershov, were detained by the Centre for Combating Extremism and later released. The protest was organized by Anton Isakov, a local who organized other protests against other social media national bans in Russia. Additionally, a counter-protest was present at the same time, calling for support to local Russian producers and questioning the mental health effect that Roblox has on children.

The hashtag, #BringBackRoblox, trended on several Russian social media apps, accompanied by sarcastic remarks made by those Russian Roblox players, with some Russian children who played Roblox also stating that they would threaten to overthrow the Russian Government if Roblox ban wasn't lifted.

== Aftermath ==
The amount of backlash initially prompted the Russian government to "rush" to make a localized alternative app to Roblox with its own moderation and filter, with Vladislav Grib publicly calling for it. However, on 10 June 2026 the Minkomsvyaz officially declared that he would not step down on his decision.

The government stated that Roblox had successfully implemented a range of additional child-protection measures. Following the lift of the ban Mizulina questioned in a public statement whether it was "time to look for other ways to combat pedophiles and provocateurs who target children online", and Dmitry Peskov made it an example of a service that complied with local laws and thus was unbanned.

The platform's messaging functionality was restricted from Russian users after the lifting of the ban, although Mizulina commented that Russian users would soon be able to chat with one another. Roblox vowed to enhance the platform's content and moderation systems. Following the decision to overturn the ban, Roblox's stocks had a surge of 5%.

== See also ==
- Roblox–Schlep controversy – a topic that greatly publicized the issue of child safety on Roblox.
