= Limonka (newspaper) =

Russian newspaper

- Type: Newspaper
- Format: Broadsheet
- Owner(s): National Bolshevik Party (1994-2007); The Other Russia (since 2010)
- Editor: Eduard Limonov; Aleksey Volynets
- Founded: 1994
- Headquarters: Moscow, Russia
- Circulation: 10.000
- Website: Limonka

Limonka - newspaper of direct action (Russian: Лимонка - газета прямого действия) is a Moscow-based newspaper. Limonka was the official organ of the National Bolshevik Party until it was banned in 2007; since 2010 it has been the official organ of The Other Russia. The name is a play of words on the party's founder surname Limonov and idiomatic Russian for grenade. Limonka was published every two weeks. The newspaper was banned in 2002.

== History ==
Prior to the founding of Limonka, Eduard Limonov, leader of the National Bolshevik Party, published opinion columns called "Limonka on..." for the newspaper Novy Vzyglad. After the NBP was founded, the party decided that Limonka should become the party's official organ as its own newspaper. The first edition was printed on the November 28, 1994, in Tver.

In 1995, Limonka published issues 13 and 16, which featured articles written by Limonov titled “Hand grenades at Croats" and "Black lists of peoples". In "Black lists of peoples", Limonov, in light of the First Chechen War, argued that "bad peoples" exist and agitated against foreign countries and ethnicities, claiming they have a historical collective guilt before Russia and Russia should therefore "settle the score". Limonov names Croatia due to war crimes against the Krajina serbs, the Ustaše and collaboration with the Axis, Czechia and Slovakia due to the Czechoslovak Legion intervening in the Russian Civil War and, according to Limonov, committing war crimes against whites, reds and Siberian peasants, Latvia due to the "racist anti-Russian laws" and various peoples of the North Caucasus, namely Chechens, Ingush and Crimean Tatars, which Limonov accuses of banditry and collaboration with the Nazis.

The so-called “deportations” were acts of just retribution. Joseph Stalin, who knew the Caucasus, acted wisely. It’s a pity he didn’t see it through to the end. Russia has no friends. We love our allies, but our enemies—whether they be brave or scoundrels—must be pacified or destroyed. Our ancestors knew this. General Yermolov expelled the Ingush in 1830, saying that “the Ingush cannot be reformed.”

— Eduard Limonov, ЧЕРНЫЙ СПИСОК НАРОДОВ". Limonka. June 1995.

He also argued for military action against Czechia, Slovakia and Latvia and theorized that some ethnicities have a predisposition for cruelty and brutality. In 1996, the Russian constitutional court ruled the articles as unconstitutional and Limonka and Limonov received a warning due to racism, incitement of racial hatred and glorification of war.

On July 26, 2002 Limonka was banned by The Khamovnichesky Court of Moscow for "promoting extremism and calling on overthrowing the constitutional order". Federal Agency on Press accused the newspaper of abuse of freedom of the press and violation of Article 4 of the Law "On Mass Media", pointing out that the publications in Limonka are aimed at inciting of social intolerance and discord and contain calls for the forcible seizure of power and propaganda of war. Oleg Mironov, Ombudsman in Russia, in his report for 2002, substantiated the liquidation of the newspapers Limonka and Russian Host as "a series of steps to curb the propaganda of ethnic hatred".

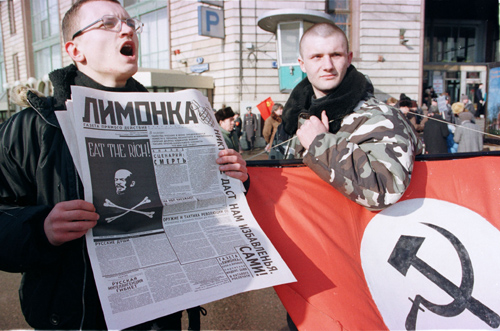
Members of the National Bolshevik party at a protest rally in Moscow with a copy of the Limonka newspaper. Photo by Mikhail Evstafiev.

Since then, Limonka was printed under title General Line (Russian: Генеральная линия). After the ban of the newspaper General Line in 2006, Limonka was published as On the edge (Russian: На краю), and in 2007, as Trudodni (Russian: Трудодни). Issue 319 for July 2007 was published under the logo of Other Russia.

In all cases the title Limonka was printed in large letters under new titles (General Line, On the edge, Trudodni) in a smaller font, along with the note that the paper hasn't come out since September 20, 2002 (but retained continuous numbering of newspaper Limonka).

Starting from issue 327, the printed edition was discontinued in favor of digital distribution online in the form of PDF files.

The Other Russia runs a YouTube channel under the name Limonka (@drugorosTV).

== Content and aesthetics ==
Limonka was stylized as a punk zine, but with a more professional quality. The front page of the newspaper featured Limonov's column "Words from the leader", while the back page chronicled contemporary underground culture and reports from street protests and direct actions of the NBP. Other regular features included "How to understand (Brainwashing)" which were reports and editorial comments on contemporary sociopolitical issues, a parody of the Breaking news genre titled "Died in Style" and "Legends", which were stories and portrayals of resistance fighters and rebels in history.

It’s distinctive aesthetic and stylistic features included humor and irony, postmodernism and an engaging presentation of material. The newspaper topics circled around radical politics, counterculture and "acute" social issues.

The painter and collagist Aleksandr Lebedev-Frontov was responsible for the graphic layout and visual aesthetics of the newspaper, which were described as a reinterpretation of totalitarian aesthetics through the lens of industrial culture and retrofuturist surrealism. His collage on the front page of issue 73 became an icon of the NBP. It pictures fictional French supervillian Fantômas wearing his mask and pointing his gun at the viewer and the slogan “Stand up, you who have been branded by a curse!”.

Under associate editor and anarchist Alexei Tsvetkov, the newspaper's mix of postmodern art and radicalism was pushed even further, with him fantasizing in articles about ascending to an "Armed Paradise" with people like Andreas Baader and Che Guevara or building an army of "new Russian skinheads" inspired by Duginist mysticism, hypermasculinity and fictional figure Stierlitz.

== Books ==
- Поколение Лимонки (Generation of Limonka), Ultra.Kultura, 2005 - book of short stories by a young Russian authors published in Limonka
- Окопная правда Чеченской войны (Truth of the trenches of Chechen War), Yauza-Press, Moscow, 2007 - collection of articles about War in Chechnya that were published in the newspaper Limonka
- Лимонка в тюрьму (Limonka to a prison), Centrpoligraf, Moscow, 2012 - memories of national-bolsheviks - political prisoners

== Contributors ==
=== Regular ===
- Eduard Limonov - founder and editor
- Sergei Aksenov
- Aleksandr Averin
- Andrei Dmitriev
- Aleksandr Dugin
- Alexei Tsvetkov
- Vladimir Linderman
- Natalya Medvedeva
- Zakhar Prilepin
- Aleksandr Lebedev-Frontov - graphic layout

=== Occasional ===
- Oleg Kashin
- Roman Konoplev
- Misha Verbitsky

== See also ==
- Freedom of the press in the Russian Federation
- National Bolshevism
