= Yelena Shchapova =

Italian-Russian model, writer and poet (born 1950)

- Елена Щапова
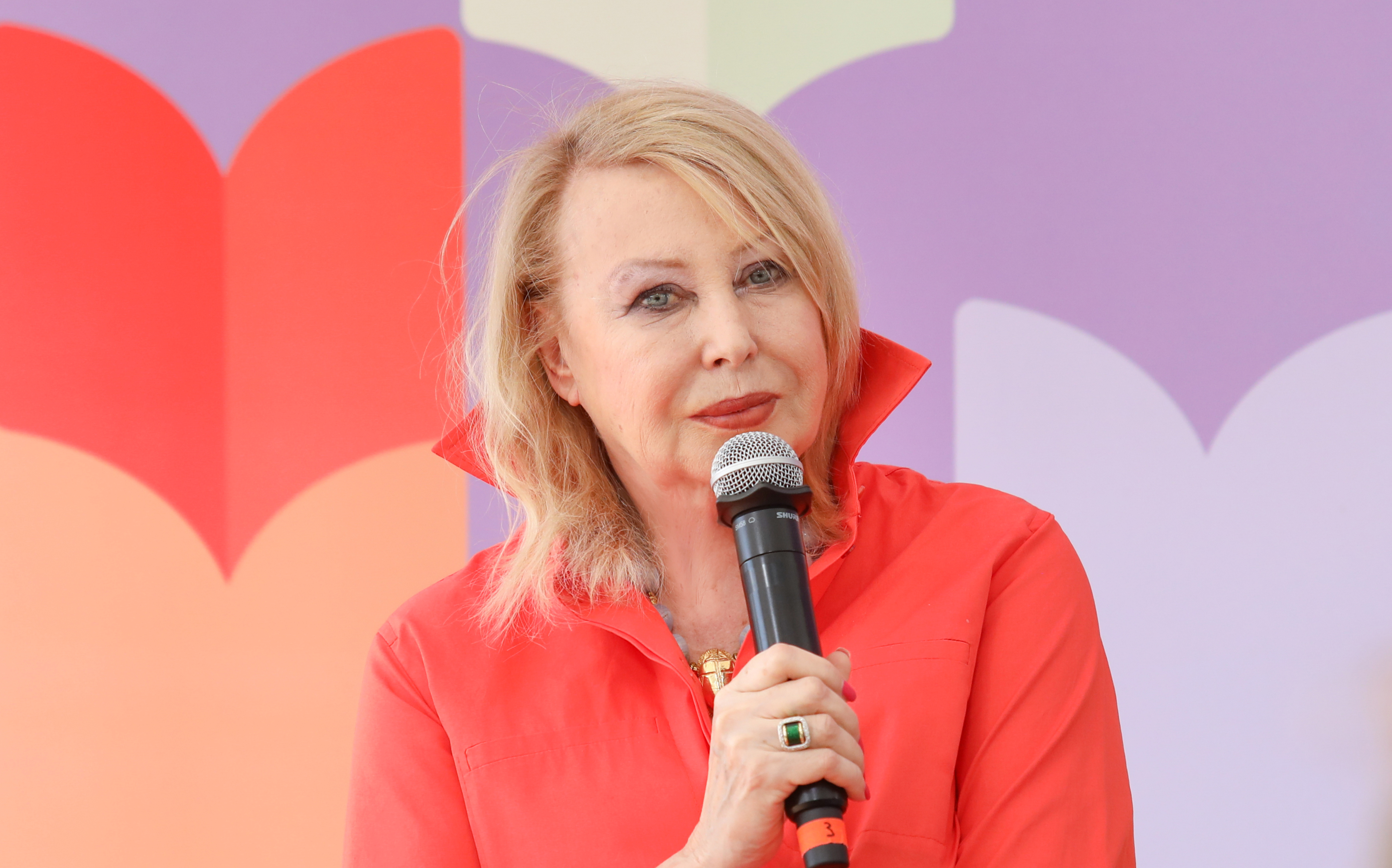
- Shchapova in 2024
- Born: Elena Sergeevna Kozlova; 22 June 1950 (age 76); Moscow, Russian SFSR, Soviet Union
- Occupations: Model; writer; poet
- Partner: Eduard Limonov (m. 1971, divorced)

Yelena Sergeevna Shchapova de Carli (Russian: Елена Сергеевна Щапова де Карли, née Kozlova (Козлова), also known by her Italianised name Contessa Elena Sciapova de Carli (born 22 June 1950), is an Italian-Russian model, writer, and poet.

== Biography ==
Elena Sergeevna Kozlova was born in Moscow in 1950. Besides working as a model, she wrote poetry.

Her first husband was Viktor Shchapov, an artist. She was married to Eduard Limonov in 1971. She and her husband emigrated from the Soviet Union to the United States in 1974. Shortly after, she divorced Limonov and married an Italian nobleman, Count Gianfranco de Carli, also gaining Italian citizenship.

Shchapova published her first book, It's me Yelena, in 1984, as a response to It's Me, Eddie.

== Literature ==
Shchapova is one of the main characters in Limonov's book It's Me, Eddie. She is also a character in Carrère's novel Limonov.
