= Sin (Prilepin novel) =

- First edition (Russian)
- Author: Zakhar Prilepin
- Original title: Грех
- Language: Russian
- Publisher: Vargius
- Publication date: 2007
- Publication place: Russia
- English publication date: 2012
- ISBN: 978-9-08-182393-7

Sin (Russian: Грех) is a 2007 short story cycle (sometimes regarded as a novel) by the Russian writer Zakhar Prilepin. Like many of his books, it explores the disturbing connection between sex and violence, between killing and sexual awakening, in an endless loop.

== Synopsis ==
Sin is a cycle of interlinked stories that, taken together, trace the life of a man named Zakhar. The reader follows his growth from early childhood, when, as the youngest among the neighborhood boys, he experiences a traumatic event — the death of a friend. With the exception of two pieces, the stories are all told in the first person.

Zakhar’s youth is marked by a powerful yet forbidden feeling — his infatuation with a cousin — which ultimately leads him to an important moral realization: the need to avoid sin. As an adult, his life becomes harsh and unsettled. He scrapes by on odd jobs, working as a bar bouncer, a loader, even a gravedigger, while drinking heavily. At one point, he nearly resolves to take a desperate step and join the French Foreign Legion, but abandons the idea in the end.

Zakhar’s life takes a dramatic turn once he starts a family. At first, he lives with the woman he loves; later, he raises two sons. Yet the weight of financial responsibility forces him, despite his deep aversion, back into the job of a bouncer. His story ends tragically: he is sent on an assignment to Chechnya, where he is killed.

== Prizes and awards ==
- The National Bestseller Literary Prize 2008
- The Super Natsbest Prize 2011
