= Nepal Forever =

- Film poster
- Russian: Непал форева
- Directed by: Alyona Polunina
- Produced by: Alexander Rodnyansky
- Cinematography: Dmitriy Rakov
- Music by: Victor Mors
- Release date: 12 November 2013
- Running time: 88 minutes
- Country: Russia
- Language: Russian

Nepal Forever (Russian: Непал форева) is a 2013 documentary comedy by Russian filmmaker Alyona Polunina.

== Plot ==
The film shows two Russian communists from Saint Petersburg who go to Nepal. They want negotiate the reconciliation between Maoists and Marxists.
