= The Pathologies =

2005 novel by Zakhar Prilepin

- 2006 edition (Russian)
- Author: Zakhar Prilepin
- Original title: Патологии
- Language: Russian
- Series: War
- Publisher: Andreevskiy Flag
- Publication date: 2005
- Publication place: Russia
- ISBN: 978-5-17-073224-1

The Pathologies (Russian: Патологии) is a 2004 debut novel by the Russian writer Zakhar Prilepin about the First Chechen War.

The work was published online, where it garnered significant readership, before being featured in the literary journal Sever, where it received widespread acclaim. In 2005, upon its release as a book, it was shortlisted for the National Bestseller Prize.

== Synopsis ==
The protagonist is a spetsnaz soldier fighting in Chechnya. A unit of eighty commandos from the Russian town of Svyatoi Spas arrives in Grozny for a deployment. Their commander is known as Semyonych, his deputy Yazva, and the platoon leader Sheya—nicknames used by the men. They pass through the ruined, desolate city and settle on its outskirts, in an abandoned and booby-trapped school. The building is quickly turned into a fortress, and the countdown of their service begins.

The days pass by. They stand watch, lead night patrols, and endure sporadic gunfire. There are long periods where there are no significant occurrences.

Soon, real work arrives — “cleansing operations” in the city. The commandos kill their first eight Chechens and then drink themselves senseless after the mission. The night shelling of the school continues. More raids follow, with civilian casualties and the destruction of fighters. The narrator, Yegor Tashevsky, sees the corpses of Russian conscripts at the airport — men killed through betrayal and the negligence of their superiors. The sight only deepens his already grim outlook. He survives his fear by clinging to memories of his dead father and his beloved Dasha.

When militants launch another assault, the first members of the unit are killed. Drinking escalates, fear is no longer hidden. During a village sweep, fighters who attempt to surrender are executed on the spot, in defiance of orders. No prisoners are taken. After losing several men in combat, the survivors drink themselves into oblivion. Guards abandon their posts, and Chechen militants storm the school.

The final quarter of the book is devoted to this last battle. Yegor, terrified, tries to hide his fear while commanding his squad. Nearly the entire platoon is wiped out. Yegor’s friend Sania is killed before his eyes. Commander Semyonych, away at headquarters to file a report, rushes to the rescue with three armored carriers. They manage to evacuate the wounded, while the rest of the platoon fights on. In the chaos, some soldiers break, but most fight to the end. Semyonych explains that militants have attacked the entire city at once, from all sides. The federal forces (the Russian army) were unprepared.

The school is shelled for hours. With no ammunition left, the remaining commandos attempt an escape through a ravine filled with mud and rainwater. Many are shot as they leap from windows. Yegor survives by swimming through the filthy mire. Alongside a soldier nicknamed Monk — a man he had never liked — he hides for hours in the underbrush. Monk ends up saving Yegor’s life, just as Yegor had once wondered he might.

By dawn, a handful of survivors straggle along the road away from the annihilated school. Russian reinforcements finally pick them up. Drunk, silent, and hollowed out, the surviving commandos return home to Svyatoi Spas.

== Analysis ==
According to Bradley A. Gorski, The Pathologies introduced Prilepin's "deeply felt and sensitively explored lyrical militance" to the public. It kicked off a series of Prilepin's books which feature "autobiographical protagonists navigating between deeply felt love — both carnal and familial — and violence".
