= Alyona Polunina =

Russian independent filmmaker (born 1975)

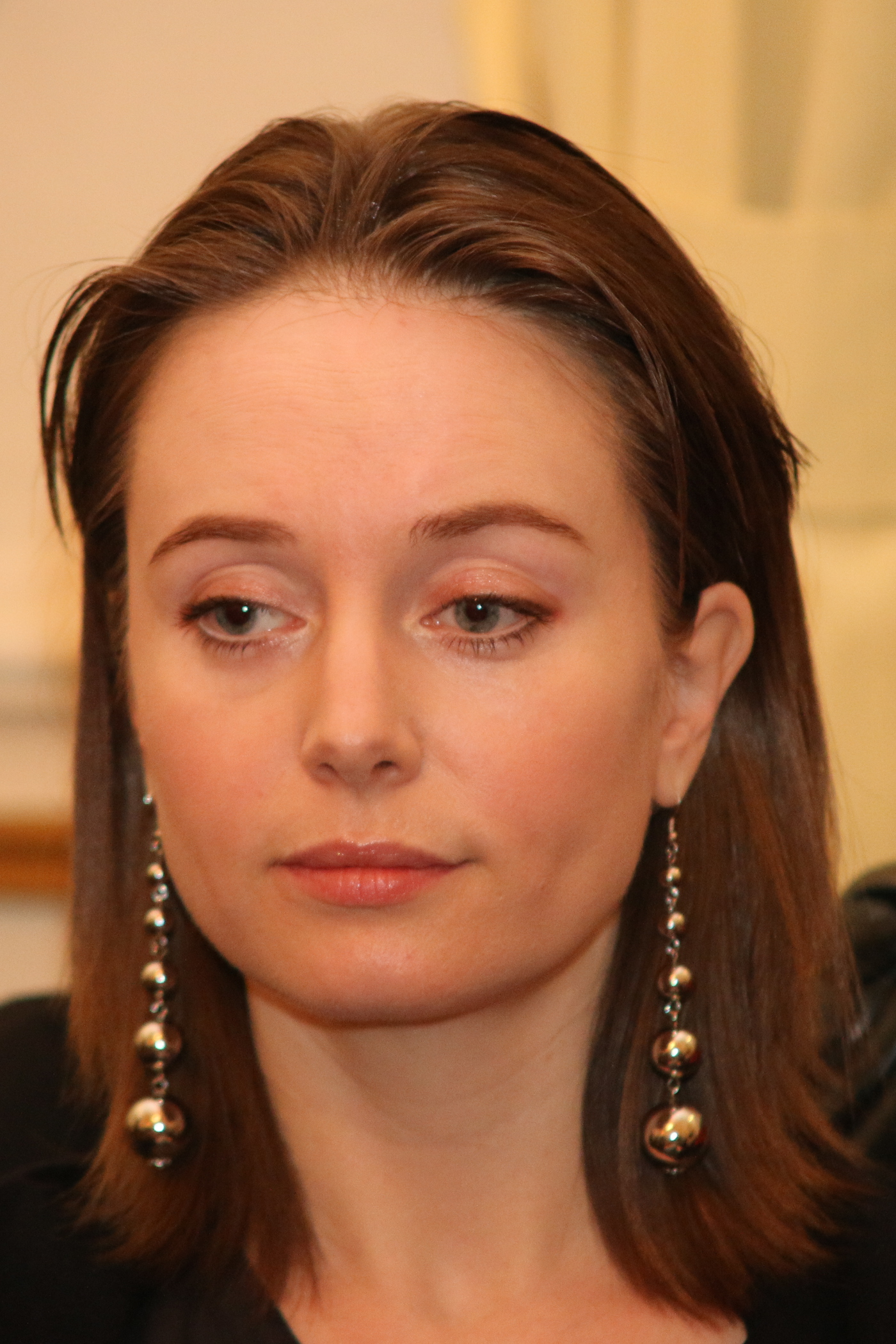
- Born: 31 December 1975 (age 50); Tuapse, Russian SFSR, Soviet Union
- Occupations: Film director, screenwriter
- Years active: 2004–present

Alyona Polunina (Russian: Алёна Полунина; born 31 December 1975) is a Russian independent filmmaker.

== Biography ==
Alyona Polunina was born in Tuapse. In 2002, she won an educational grant and enrolled in a school for script writers and producers in Moscow. She graduated from the school in 2004.

She works in the Russian film industry.

== Filmography ==
- Yes, Death (2004) Director, Writer, Producer, Cinematographer
- One of the Cases of Bird Flu (2005)
- Sacrum (2005)
- Festival (2007)
- The Revolution That Wasn't (2008), Director, Editor, Writer
- Nepal Forever (2013), Director, Writer, Editor
- Varya (2014), Director
- Their Own Republic (2018), Director
- Among the dead, among the living (2024), Director
