= Zakhar Prilepin =

Russian writer and politician (born 1975)

- Захар Прилепин
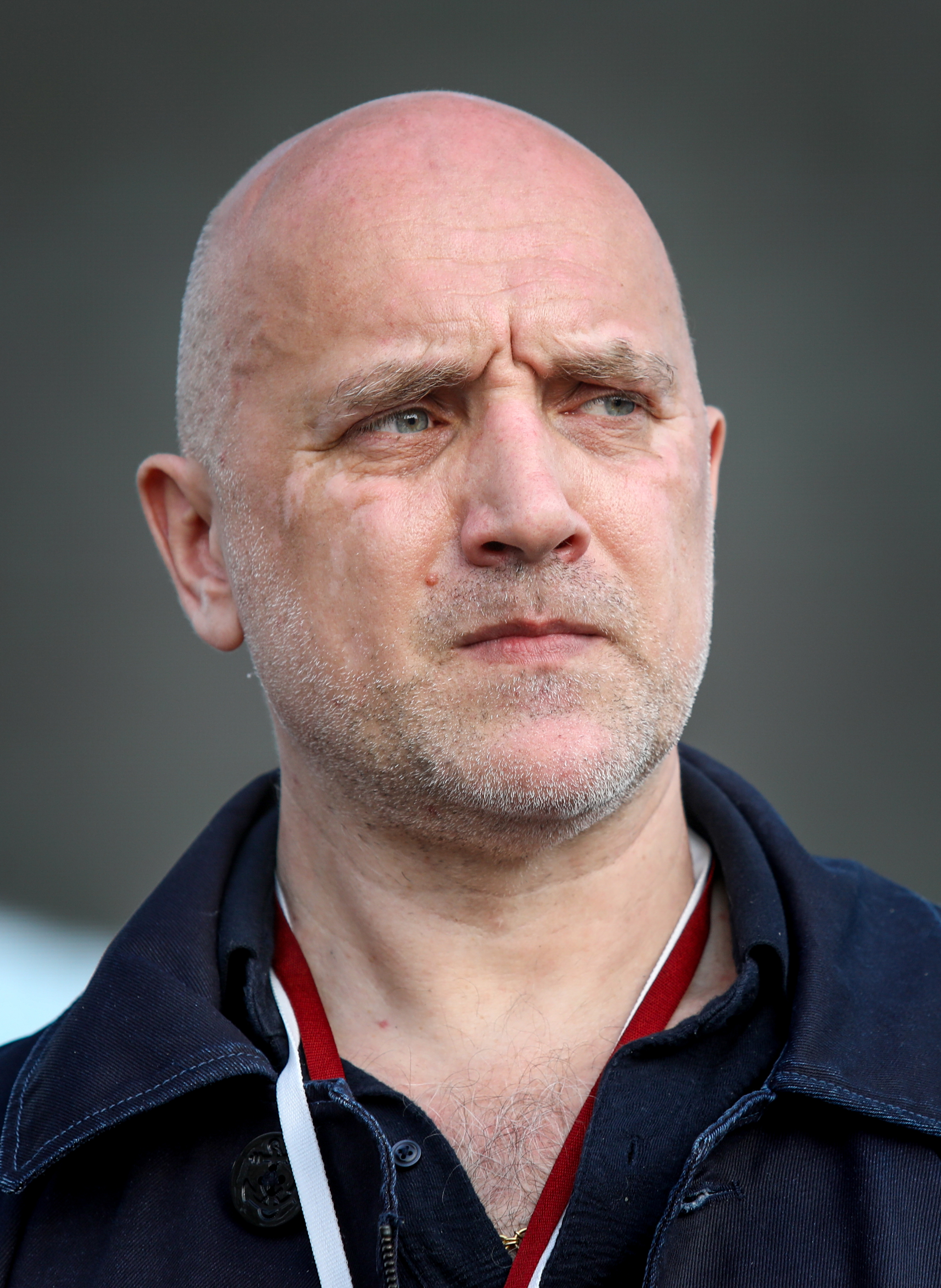
- Prilepin in 2020

Co-Chairman of A Just Russia – For Truth
- In office 22 February 2021 – 25 October 2025
- Preceded by: Office established
- Succeeded by: Office abolished

Chairman of For Truth
- In office 1 February 2020 – 22 February 2021
- Preceded by: Office established
- Succeeded by: Office abolished

Personal details
- Born: 7 July 1975 (age 51) Ilyinka, Ryazan Oblast, Russian SFSR, Soviet Union
- Party: A Just Russia – For Truth (2021–present)
- Other political affiliations: For Truth (2019–2021); National Bolshevik Party (2007–2018)
- Education: Nizhny Novgorod State University
- Occupation: Writer; Rosgvardiya officer; journalist; politician
- Awards: Order of Courage

Military service
- Allegiance: Russia; Donetsk People's Republic
- Branch/service: OMON; Donetsk People's Militia; National Guard of Russia
- Years of service: 1994–1999; 2016–2018; 2023
- Rank: Podpolkovnik
- Battles/wars: First Chechen War; Second Chechen War; War in Donbas; Russian invasion of Ukraine
- Writing career
- Pen name: Zakhar Prilepin; Yevgeny Lavlinsky
- Language: Russian
- Years active: 2003–present
- Period: Contemporary
- Genres: Novel; novella; short story; song; biography; essay; opinion journalism
- Movement: Realism

Yevgeny Nikolayevich Prilepin (Russian: Евгений Николаевич Прилепин; born 7 July 1975), writing as Zakhar Prilepin (Russian: Захар Прилепин), and sometimes using another pseudonym, Yevgeny Lavlinsky (Евгений Лавлинский), is a Russian writer and politician.

He was a member of Russia's National Bolshevik Party from 1996 to 2019 and the leader of the national-conservative political party For Truth from 1 February 2020 until it merged into A Just Russia in February 2021.

== Biography ==
Yevgeny Prilepin was born 7 July 1975 in the village of Ilyinka, Ryazan Oblast, in the family of a teacher and a nurse. His family lived there until 1984, when they moved to Dzerzhinsk. He started working at age 16 as a loader in a bread shop. He graduated from the Faculty of Philology of the Nizhny Novgorod State University and the School of Public Policy. He worked as a laborer, a security guard, and served as a squad leader in the Russian police group OMON, and subsequently took part in the fighting in Chechnya in 1996 and 1999.

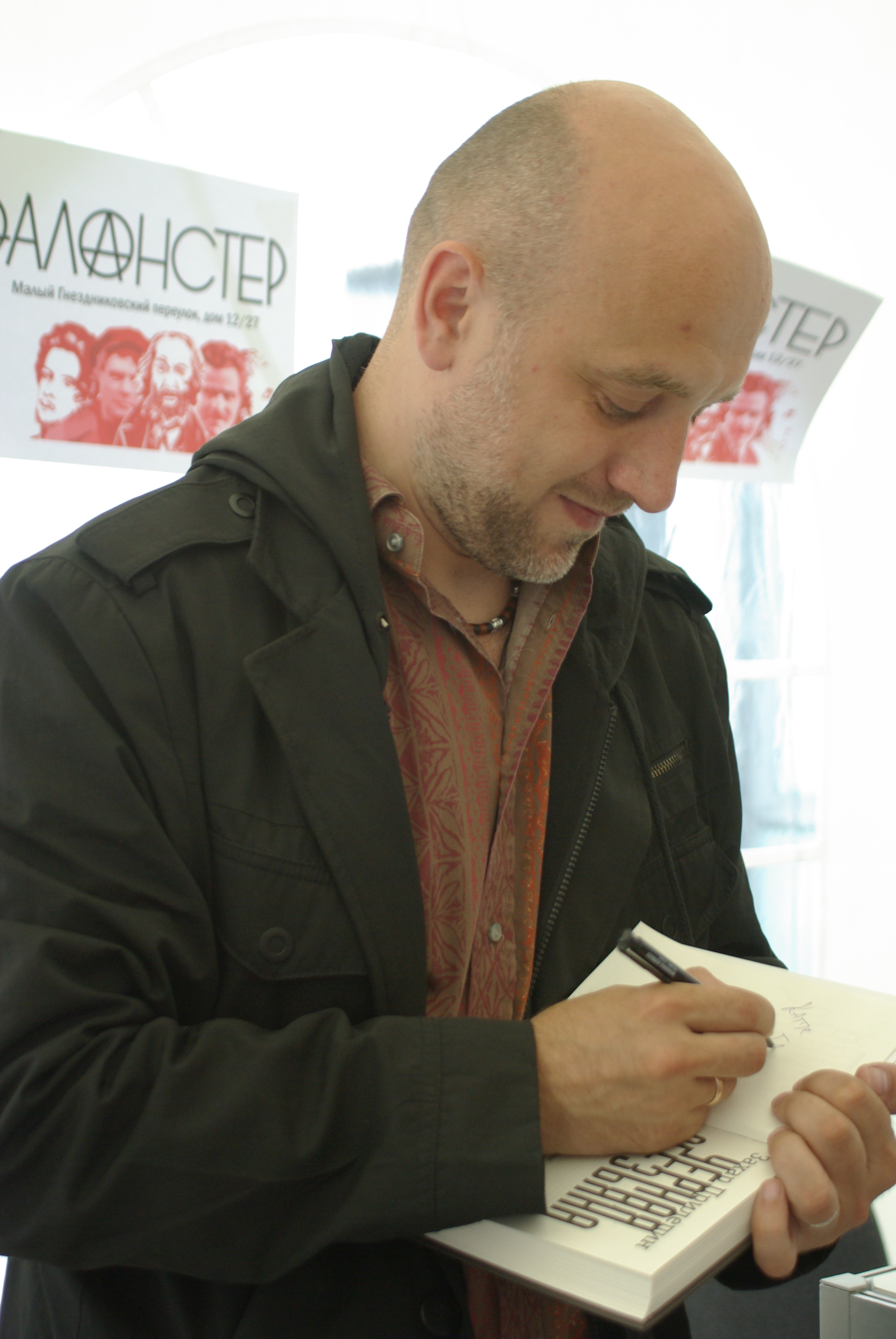
Prilepin at the 6 Moscow International Book Festival in 2011

Due to financial difficulties, Prilepin left OMON in 1999 and started working as a journalist at the Nizhny Novgorod newspaper Delo, of which he became editor the following year. He published under several pseudonyms, the most famous of which is Yevgeny Lavlinsky. At the same time, Prilepin began to work on his first novel, The Pathologies.

"The newspaper, however, was horribly yellow and sometimes even reactionary, although it was part of the holding of Sergei Kiriyenko. And I realized that I spent a life for nothing – and began to write a novel. At first, it was a novel about love, but eventually (I worked for three or four years), it turned into a novel about Chechnya as about the most powerful experience of my life – as the saying goes, whatever one does, it always turns out to be a Kalashnikov rifle."

Works by Prilepin were published in various newspapers, including Limonka, Literaturnaya Gazeta, Na Krai, and Generalnoy Linii, as well as in the magazines Sever, Druzhba Narodov, Roman-Gazeta, Novy Mir, Snob, Russkiy Pioneer, and Russkaya Zhizn. He was the chief editor of the People's Observer, the newspaper of Nizhny Novgorod's National Bolshevik Party branch. He participated in the seminar of young writers Moscow – Peredelkino (February 2004) and in the IV, V, and VI Forum of Young Writers in Moscow, Russia. He also wrote a biography of Soviet novelist Leonid Leonov. He is a member of the ideological think tank the Izborsky Club.

Prilepin was a member of the banned Russian National Bolshevik Party and a supporter of the coalition The Other Russia, and took part in the organization of the Nizhny Novgorod Dissenters' March on 24 March 2007. The media has repeatedly mentioned Prilepin's friendship with Vladislav Surkov, whose cousin is married to Prilepin's sister, Yelena.

In February 2017, Prilepin gave a lengthy interview, in which he revealed that he was leading a volunteer battalion in the self-proclaimed People's Republic of Donetsk. The battalion was the 4th Reconnaissance and Assault Battalion of the Special Forces of the Armed forces of DNR, commonly known as Prilepin's Battalion; Prilepin claimed it had been created in July 2016 on his initiative and announced "we will ride on a white horse into any town we've abandoned." Prilepin further said he was second in command with the rank of major. Prilepin was an influential figure and a celebrity in the DNR and the concept of Malorossiya was seemingly created by him.

In late July 2018, Prilepin returned "demobilized" to Moscow; the battalion he had served in was disbanded in September 2018. Prilepin boasted that the battalion had killed more Ukrainians than any other. However, there is no evidence that he took part in any actual combat. He is wanted on terrorism charges in Ukraine, and was denied entry to Bosnia-Herzegovina for security reasons.

On 29 November 2018, he joined the All-Russian People's Front. Because of this, he was excluded from The Other Russia political party by its founder Eduard Limonov, who had earlier, together with party members, told Prilepin to choose between the two political structures.

On 29 October 2019, he created the public movement For Truth (За правду). He intended for the movement to be transformed into a political party that will participate in the 2021 legislative election. However, the party merged into A Just Russia in February 2021.

Prilepin strongly supported Russia's renewed invasion of Ukraine in February 2022. For his support of the war in Ukraine, Prilepin has been sanctioned by Australia, Canada, the European Union, New Zealand, Switzerland, and the United Kingdom The European Union had included him in the very first round of sanctions on 28 February 2022 on those supporting the invasion. In January 2023, Prilepin signed a contract to join the Russian National Guard and fought in Ukraine for a second time.

=== Antisemitic controversy ===
In July 2012 Prilepin published a short essay titled "A Letter to comrade Stalin", a Stalinist critique aimed at the modern Russian "liberal society", which provoked outrage and was widely regarded as antisemitic. The essay, which is a first-person narrative of a collective Jewish consciousness, contains "autoaccusations" of antisemitic nature, and "admissions of crimes" against the Russian people, culture and economy.

=== Assassination attempt ===
On 6 May 2023, in the Nizhny Novgorod region, on the way to Moscow from the Russian-occupied territories of the Donetsk and Luhansk, Prilepin's car was blown up. Prilepin was injured, and his bodyguard died. According to the BBC, the Atesh partisan movement claimed responsibility for the attack. The attack was the third of this type targeting pro-war figures to happen in Russia after the start of its invasion of Ukraine, with the earlier ones having been the killing of Darya Dugina and the 2023 Saint Petersburg bombing that killed Vladlen Tatarsky. On 6 June 2023, Vladimir Putin awarded Prilepin the Order of Courage.

On 30 September 2024, Alexander Permyakov, a former pro-Russian separatist fighter from the Donbas region of eastern Ukraine, was convicted and sentenced to life imprisonment for his role in the attack.

== Personal life ==
Prilepin is married to Maria and has two sons and two daughters: Gleb, Ignat, Kira, and Lilia. Prilepin lives in Nizhny Novgorod.

== Bibliography ==
=== Novels ===
- Санькя – Sankya, Novel. Ad Marginem, Moscow 2006, 280 pages ISBN 978-5-91103-078-0
- Патологии – The Pathologies, Novel. Andreevsky Flag, Moscow 2005, 250 pages ISBN 978-5-17-073224-1
- Грех – Sin. Vargius, Moscow 2007 ISBN 978-9-08-182393-7
- Чёрная обезьяна (Black Ape) AST, Moscow 2012 ISBN 978-5-17-137378-8
- Обитель – The Monastery AST, Moscow 2014 ISBN 978-5170844838
- Собаки и другие люди. (Dogs and other people) (a novel in short stories) AST, Moscow 2024. On English publishing on 2025 at the Lyra Publishing house, St. Petersburg
- Тума. (Tuma) AST, Moscow 2025 ISBN 978-5-17-176266-7

=== Stories ===
- Ботинки, полные горячей водкой. (Shoes Filled with Hot Vodka) AST, Moscow 2008
- Война. (War) AST, Moscow 2008
- Революция. (Revolution) AST, Moscow 2009

=== Journalism ===
- "Letters from Donbass. Everything that needs to be resolved..." — 2016, ed. "AST"
- "Stories from an easy and instant life" — 2020, ed. "AST"
- "The name of the rivers. 40 reasons to argue about the main thing" — 2020, ed. "AST"
- Z coordinate. Russian lessons (in Russian). AST. 2023. ISBN 978-5-17-156049-2.

Manual:

- "Knigochet" (a manual on the latest literature) - 2012, ed. "Astrel"

Compilations:

- "What day of the week will happen" (a collection of selected short stories from the books "Sin" and "Shoes Full of hot Vodka") - 2008, ed. "Yasnaya Polyana"
- "Sin and other stories" (a collection of short stories, including the books "Sin", "Shoes full of hot vodka" and 2 stories that were not included in these books) - 2011, ed. "Astrel"
- "Peresvet is coming to us" (a collection of essays based on the books "I came from Russia" and "This concerns me personally" with the inclusion of several new essays) - 2012, ed. "Astrel"
- "The Road in December" (a collection of prose in one volume; with the exception of the collection "The Eight") - 2012, ed. "Astrel"

The compiler:

- "The War" (an anthology of short stories) — 2008, ed. "AST"
- "Revolution" (short story anthology) — 2009, ed. "AST"
- "Name day of the heart. Conversations with Russian Literature" (collection of interviews with writers and poets) — 2009, ed. "AST"
- "Litperron" (anthology of Nizhny Novgorod poetry) — 2011, ed. "Books"
- The Ten (an anthology of modern prose) — 2011, ed. "Ad Marginem"
- ""Limonka to prison" (an anthology of memoirs about a modern prison by NBP members) — 2012, ed. "Tsentrpoligraf"
- "14" (anthology of modern women's prose) — 2012, ed. "AST"
- "Zakhar Prilepin's Library. Poets of the XX century" — 2015, ed. "Young Guard"
- "Limonka in the war" (anthology of military memoirs of national soldiers) - 2016, ed. The "Algorithm"

The stories:

- Magazine "Russian life":
  - "The Kid's Story" — No. 15, 2007
  - "Dog Meat" — No. 11 (28), 2008
  - "Hero of Rock and Roll" — No. 12 (29), 2008
- Magazine "Our Contemporary":
  - "Zhilka" — No. 10, 2007
