= Valery Kichin (journalist) =

Russian film historian, critic, and journalist

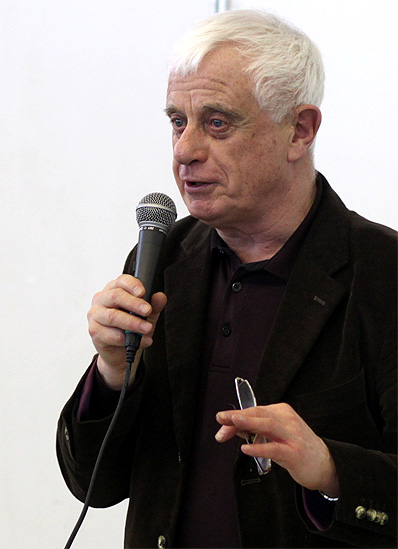
- Kichin in 2011
- Born: Valery Semyonovich Kichin; December 31, 1938 (age 87); Sverdlovsk, RSFSR, USSR
- Occupations: film critic journalist

Valery Semyonovich Kichin (Russian: Вале́рий Семёнович Ки́чин; born December 31, 1938, Sverdlovsk) is a Russian journalist, film and theater critic, radio host. He is currently a columnist for Rossiyskaya Gazeta. Honored Worker of Culture of the Russian Federation (2010). Laureate of the Government of the Russian Federation Prize (2019) and Prize of the Russian Guild of Film Critics (2003).

Graduated from the Music School at the Urals Mussorgsky State Conservatoire in Sverdlovsk (piano class) and the journalism faculty of the Ural State University in 1961.

He was a member of the jury of national and international film festivals (Varna, Sochi, Yekaterinburg, Odesa, Khanty-Mansiysk), a member of the FIPRESCI jury at the Montreal World Film Festival, a member of the jury of the Golden Mask (twice), chairman of the jury of Russian critics at the Moscow International Film Festival.

In 2018, it was censored: a review made by Kichin following the premiere of the film Donbass at the Cannes Film Festival completely disappeared from Rossiyskaya Gazeta. On the last day of the festival, a paragraph dedicated to Sergei Loznitsa's painting was again removed in the same newspaper, and the editorial staff did not inform the author.
