= Andrei Dmitriev (politician) =

Russian politician (born 1979)

- Андрей Юрьевич Дмитриев
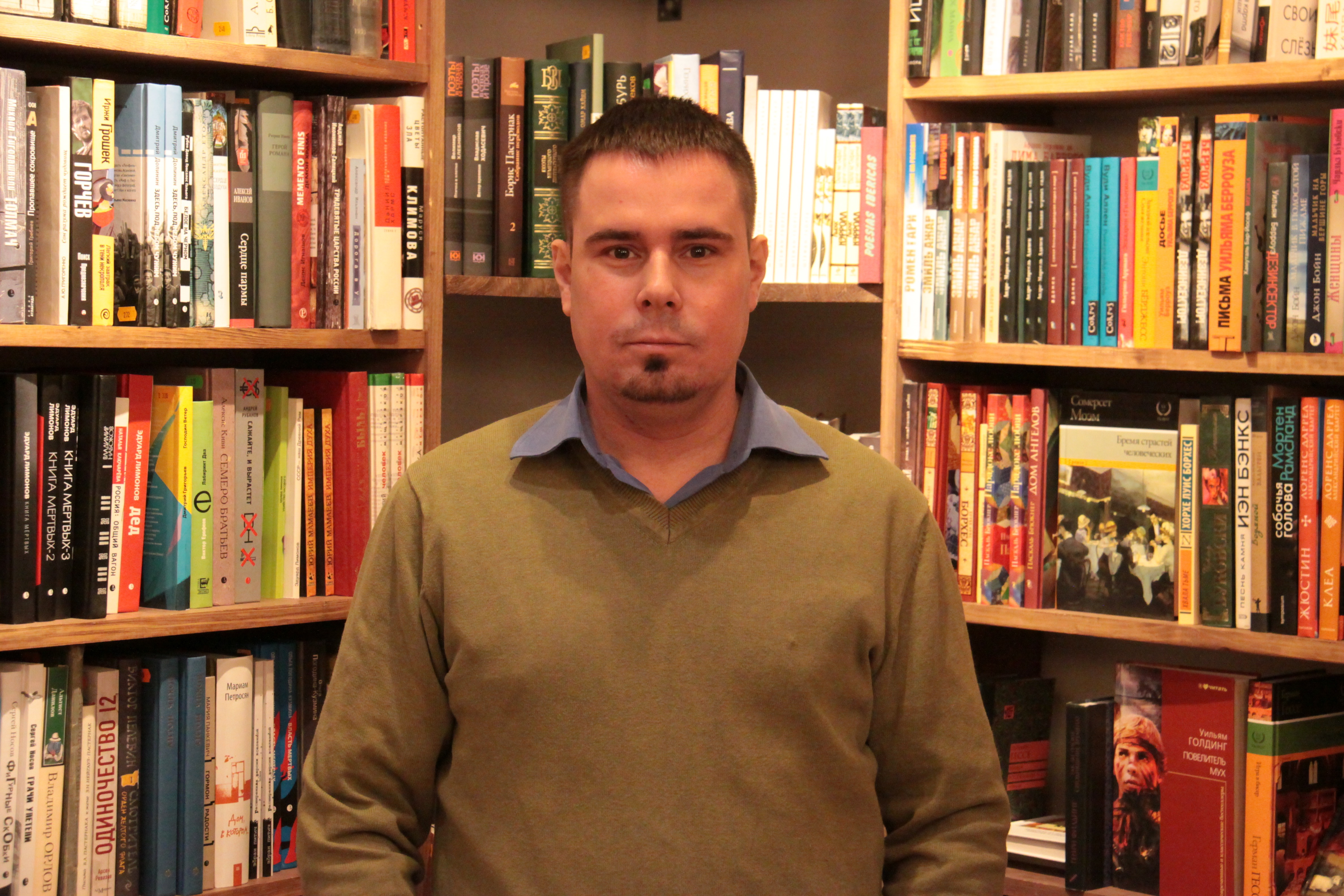
- Born: 12 September 1979 (age 47); Leningrad, Russian SFSR, USSR
- Education: Herzen University
- Occupations: politician, publicist, writer
- Known for: Russian political activist
- Political party: National Bolshevik Party; The Other Russia
- Movement: Non-system opposition
- Partner: Natalia Sidoreeva
- Children: 2 children

Andrei Yuryevich Dmitriev (Russian: Андре́й Ю́рьевич Дми́триев; born 12 September 1979 in Leningrad (Saint Petersburg)) is a Russian political dissident, publicist, member of National Bolshevik Party since 1996, co-founder of coalition The Other Russia and one of leaders of the eponymous political party The Other Russia. He works as a journalist.

== Biography ==
Dmitriev was born in Saint Petersburg. He studied in Herzen State Pedagogical University of Russia.

== Political career ==
Since 1996 Dmitriev has been a member of the National Bolshevik Party. In 2001 he became a member of its Central Committee. In 2008 Dmitriev was one of the organizers of the Dissenters' March. In 2009 Dmitriev was one of the organizers of Strategy-31 in Saint Petersburg. Dmitriev was repeatedly detained during Strategy-31 actions. In 2010 Dmitriev co-founded the political party The Other Russia and became leader of its Saint Petersburg branch.

== Filmography ==
Andrei Dmitriev is one of the main character in the documentary The Revolution That Wasn't and one of the main characters in the French documentary Les Enfants terribles de Vladimir Vladimirovitch Poutine.

== Bibliography ==
Under the pseudonym Andrei Balkankiy he wrote two books-biographies:

- Kim Ir Sen (Molodaya Gvardiya, 2011, ISBN 978-5-235-03348-1)
- Eduard Limonov (Molodaya Gvardiya, 2017, ISBN 978-5-235-03903-2)
