= Centre for Combating Extremism =

Centre for Combating Extremism Главное управление по противодействию экстремизму МВД России
- Emblem of the Centre for Combating Extremism
- Abbreviation: Centre E

Agency overview
- Formed: September 6, 2008
- Legal personality: Governmental: Government agency

Jurisdictional structure
- Federal agency: Russia
- Operations jurisdiction: Russia
- Primary governing body: Federal Government of Russia
- Secondary governing body: Ministry of Internal Affairs
- General nature: Federal law enforcement
- Specialist jurisdiction: Protection of international or domestic VIPs, protection of significant state assets

Operational structure
- Headquarters: 16, Zhitnaya street, Moscow, Russia

Website
- mvd.ru

The Main Directorate for Countering Extremism of the Ministry of Internal Affairs of Russia, (Note: Russian: Главное управление по противодействию экстремизму МВД России, romanized: Glavnoye upravleniye po protivodeystviyu ekstremizmu MVD Rossii.) commonly known as the Centre for Combating Extremism, or simply Centre E, (Note: Russian: Центр «Э».) is a unit within the Ministry of Internal Affairs of Russia officially tasked with combatting extremism.

== History ==
The unit was established by decree No. 1316 of the president of Russia on 16 September 2008. The unit has been especially active in the North Caucasus and also in Crimea following its annexation in 2014. It is the main institutition tasked with countering extremism, which it does by monitoring the media and the Internet.

The unit has been accused of prosecuting and harassing opposition groups, anti-government bloggers, environmentalists and other civic activists. For instance, it has been involved in the suppression of Jehovah's Witnesses in Russia after it was declared an extremist organisation in 2017. Since 2023, it has also engaged in the suppression of LGBTQ symbolism in the country after the LGBTQ movement was declared an extremist organisation by the Supreme Court of Russia.
