= Eduard Limonov =

Russian writer (1943–2020)

- Эдуард Лимонов
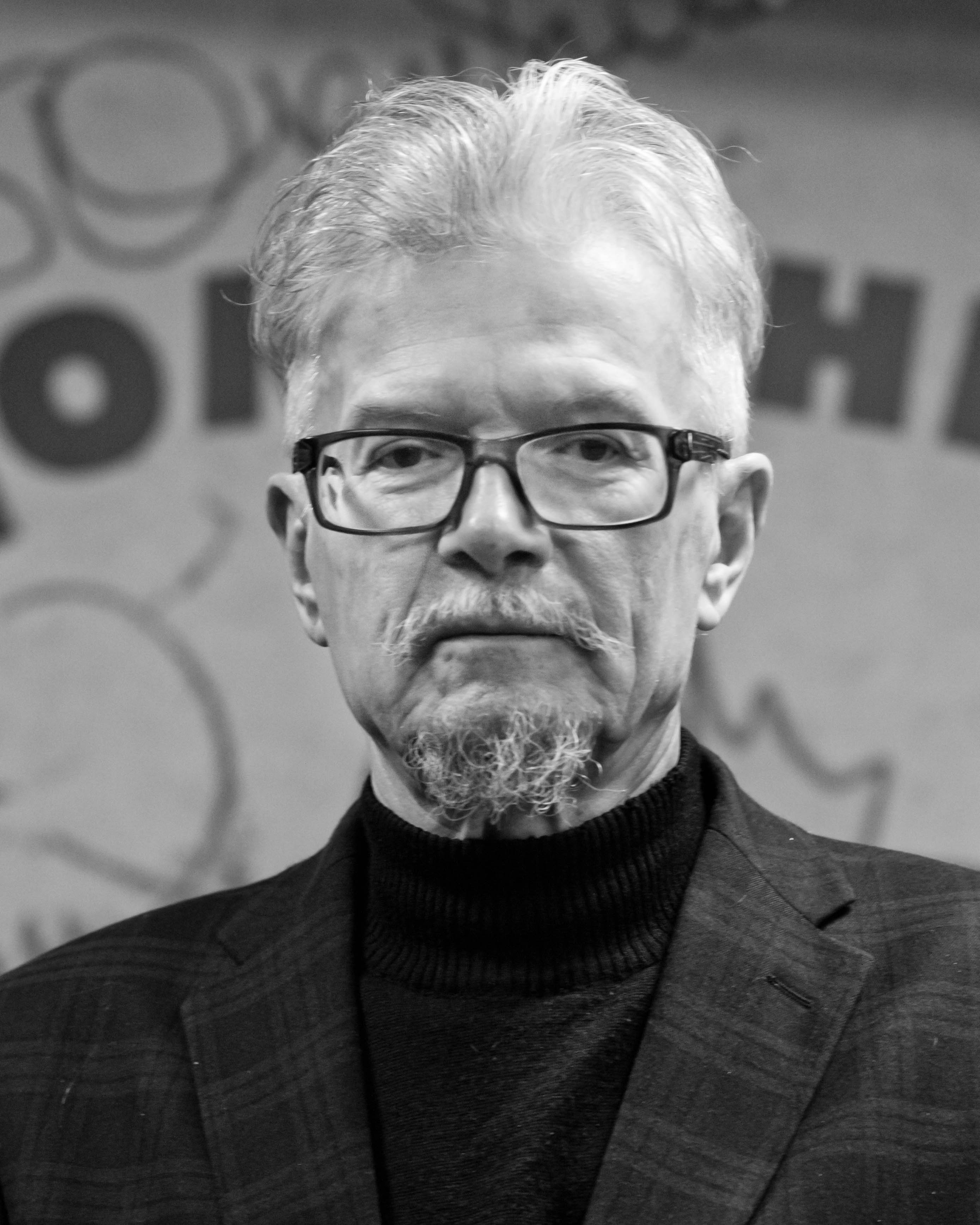
- Limonov in 2008
- Born: Eduard Veniaminovich Savenko; 22 February 1943; Dzerzhinsk, Gorky Oblast, Russian SFSR, Soviet Union
- Died: 17 March 2020 (aged 77); Moscow, Russia
- Citizenship: Soviet (1943–74); Stateless (1974–1987); French (1987–2011); Russian (1992–2020)
- Education: Kharkiv National Pedagogical University
- Occupations: Writer; poet; essayist; publicist; leader of The Other Russia; former leader of the National Bolshevik Party; editor of newspaper Limonka
- Partner(s): Anna Rubinshtein; Yelena Shchapova; Natalya Medvedeva (1983–1995); Elisabeth Bleze; Anastasia Lysogor; Yekaterina Volkova
- Children: 2
- Writing career
- Period: 1958–2020
- Genres: Novel, poetry, short story, autobiography, political essay
- Notable works: It's Me, Eddie; His Butler's Story; A Young Scoundrel; Memoir of a Russian Punk; The Book of Water
- Movement: Postmodernism (Russian postmodernism)
- Eduard Limonov's voice recorded March 2013
- Website: limonov-eduard.livejournal.com

Eduard Veniaminovich Limonov (Note: In this name that follows East Slavic naming customs, the patronymic is Veniaminovich and the family name is Limonov.) (Note: Russian: Эдуард Вениаминович Лимонов, IPA: [ɪdʊˈart vʲɪnʲɪɐˈmʲinəvʲɪtɕ lʲɪˈmonəf]) (né Savenko; 22 February 1943 – 17 March 2020) was a Russian writer, poet, publicist, political dissident and politician.

Limonov is best known for his novel It's me, Eddie, released in 1979. He emigrated from the Soviet Union in 1974, but returned to Russia in 1991, where he founded the National Bolshevik Party. The party was banned in the country in 2007 and superseded by The Other Russia. In the 2000s, he was one of the leaders of The Other Russia coalition of opposition forces.

== Biography ==
=== Early life, 1943–1966 ===
Limonov was born in Dzerzhinsk, Gorky Oblast, Soviet Union. His father was born in the Voronezh Oblast while his mother was born in the Gorky Oblast. Limonov's father—then in the military service – was in a state security career and his mother was a homemaker. In the early years of his life his family moved to Kharkov in the Ukrainian SSR, where Limonov grew up. He studied at the H.S. Skovoroda Kharkiv National Pedagogical University.

By Limonov's own account, he began writing "very bad" poetry at the age of thirteen and soon after became involved in theft and petty crime as an adolescent hooligan. Limonov adopted his pen name for use in literary circles during this time.

In December 1973, KGB Chairman Yuri Andropov labeled Limonov a 'staunch anti-Soviet.'

=== Konkret poets in Moscow, 1966–1974 ===
In 1966, together with his first wife, Anna Moiseevna Rubinstein, (their marriage was not registered officially) he first came to Moscow, earning money sewing trousers (Limonov "dressed" many in the intelligentsia; sculptor Ernst Neizvestny and poet Bulat Okudzhava among others), but later returned to Kharkov.

Limonov moved to Moscow again in 1967, marrying a fellow poet, Yelena Shchapova, in a Russian Orthodox ceremony in 1973. During his period in Moscow, Limonov was involved in the Konkret poets' group and sold volumes of his self-published poetry while doing various day jobs. Having achieved a degree of success in this manner by the mid-1970s, and he and his wife emigrated from the Soviet Union in 1974. The exact circumstances of Limonov's departure are unclear and have been described differently. Reportedly, the KGB secret police gave him a choice either to become an informant, or leave the country.

=== Literary exile in New York, 1974–1980 ===
Although neither he nor Shchapova were Jewish, the Soviet Union issued permission for the couple to emigrate to Israel, but soon after the couple arrived in the United States. Limonov settled in New York City, where he and Shchapova soon divorced.

Limonov worked for a Russian-language newspaper as a proofreader and occasionally interviewed recent Soviet emigrants. Like Eddie, the immigrant protagonist of Limonov's first novel It's Me, Eddie, Limonov was drawn to punk subculture and radical politics. Limonov's New York acquaintances included Studio 54's Steve Rubell and a Trotskyist group, the Socialist Workers Party. As protagonist Eddie finds out as a consequence, the latter is a political target of the FBI. Limonov was himself harassed by the FBI. As he later recounted, the FBI interrogated dozens of his acquaintances, once asking a friend about "Lermontov" in Paris when he had resettled in France.

I did not find the freedom to be a radical opponent of the existing social structure of the country which pompously calls itself the 'leader of the free world,' but neither did I notice it in the land which represents itself as the 'future of all humanity.' The FBI is just as zealous in putting down American radicals as the KGB is with its own radicals and dissidents. True, the methods of the FBI are more modern. [...] The KGB is, however, studying the techniques of its older brother and modernizing its methods.

The first chapter of It's Me, Eddie, was published by an Israeli Russian-language journal. Finished by 1977, it was consistently rejected by publishers in the United States and only brought out a few years after becoming an instant success in France in 1980. In interviews, Limonov says this was because the book was not written with an anti-Soviet tone as was other Russian literature admired in the United States.

In New York, Limonov also discovered another side of the American Dream. After being a dissident, he lived a poor life due to his low income on welfare. He managed to afford a room in a miserable hostel and spent time with outcasts and homeless persons, some of whom he had casual sexual intercourse with, as related in ‘’It's me, Eddie’’, published in France under the title Le poète russe préfère les grands nègres. He then found a job as a butler for a millionaire on the Upper East Side. This period of his life led him to write autobiographical texts, including His Butler's Story.

Limonov was considered an outsider among exiliants and dissidents as he was still an unwavering and ardent communist that criticized western capitalism, denounced other dissidents like Solzhenitsyn, Brodsky or Sakharov and pursued an "outrageous" punk lifestyle which included bisexual acts, all of which he graphically depicted in ‘’It's me, Eddie’. Limonov dubbed himself the "Johnny Rotten of literature".

=== Limonov's stay in Paris, 1980–1991 ===
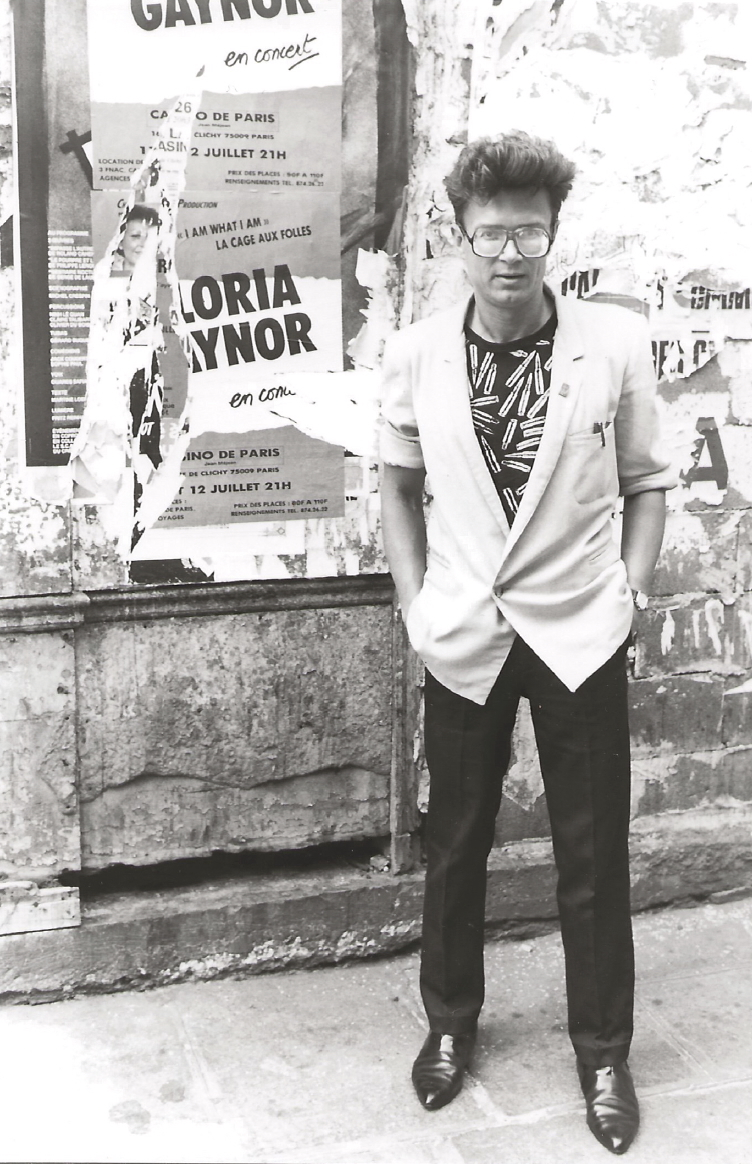
Edward Limonov in Paris, August 1984. Photo by John Oakes.

Finally, disillusioned with the country he termed "a damned outhouse bereft of spirit or purpose on the outskirts of civilization", Limonov left America for Paris with his lover Natalya Medvedeva in 1980, where he became active and made a name for himself in French literary circles. He swore to never return to the United States, and never did. Having remained stateless for thirteen years, he was granted French citizenship in 1987. Limonov and Medvedeva got married in 1982; the pair split up by 1995, but only divorced after Medvedeva's death in 2003. Limonov gave an infamous interview to Thierry Ardisson for Antenne 2 on September 25th 1989, in which Limonov wore a Red Army uniform and spoke positively about his admiration for masculinity, militarism as well as Soviet nostalgia.

=== Return to Russia and the foundation of NBP, 1991–2000 ===
In 1991, Limonov returned to Russia from France, restored his citizenship, and became active in politics. He supported the hardliners during the August coup in 1991.

Limonov was an active supporter of Serbia in the wars that followed the breakup of Yugoslavia. Paweł Pawlikowski's film Serbian Epics includes footage of him meeting with Radovan Karadžić, then the Bosnian Serb president and later a convicted war criminal, on the front lines of Sarajevo in 1992. The film also shows Limonov participating in a sniper patrol and firing a few rounds with a machine gun on the outskirts of the besieged city. This incident led to him being deemed a persona non grata among western literary circles. When asked about the incident in 2010, Limonov said he had been shooting at a target range and that Pawlikowski added an extra camera shot to make it appear he had fired into a populated area. However journalist Marc Bennetts noted that a passage in Limonov's 2001 book The Book of the Dead appeared to describe him firing a machine gun towards the city. When confronted with the passage, Limonov became angry and expressed regret at having agreed to the interview. The footage was later shown during the trial of Karadžić at The Hague. Limonov wrote about his fascination with (para-)militarism, weapons and military aesthetics and visited war zones to achieve the status of a "warrior poet" as literary figures like Mishima, D’Annunzio, Hemingway or Orwell.

On another occasion, Limonov said that he "celebrated his 50th birthday in Kninska Krajina [...] by firing from a Russian-made heavy gun at Croatian Army headquarters." During the 1990s, he supported Bosnian Serbs in the Yugoslav wars and the Armenian, Abkhaz, and Transnistrian secessionists against Azerbaijan, Georgia and Moldova, respectively. Limonov was also initially an ally of Vladimir Zhirinovsky and was named as Security Minister in a shadow cabinet formed by Zhirinovsky in 1992. However Limonov soon tired of Zhirinovsky, accusing him of moderateness and of approaching the president and consequently split from him, publishing the book "Limonov against Zhirinovsky" (1994).

Upon his return to Russia, Limonov established a sort of cult following among young, disenfranchised men due to his hyper-masculine, rebellious image and fashion style (black combat boots, leather jacket, tinted glasses).

In 1993, together with figures like Aleksandr Dugin and Yegor Letov, he founded the National Bolshevik Party which started to publish a newspaper called Limonka (the Russian nickname for the lemon-shaped F1 hand grenade; also a play on his pen name Limonov). In January 1995 in Limonka, Limonov praised Yeltsin's invasion of Chechnya starting the First Chechen War. In 1996, a Russian court judged in a hearing that the NBP paper Limonka had disseminated illegal and immoral information: "in essence, E. V. Limonov (Savenko) is an advocate of revenge and mass terror, raised to the level of state policy." The court decided to recommend issuing an official warning to Limonka, to investigate the possibility of examining whether Limonov could be held legally responsible, and to publish its decision in Rossiiskaia gazeta. After that, a criminal case was launched against him on charges of incitement of ethnic hatred and glorification of war. This was preceded by the publishing of two articles of Limonov titled “Hand grenades at Croats“ and „Black list of peoples“. In them, Limonov argued that "evil peoples" exist and certain nations have a collective guilt before Russia. He specifically names Croatia (because of the Ustaše), Czechia and Slovakia (due to the Czechoslovak Legion and their collaboration with the Nazis), Latvia (due to their "racist anti-Russian laws") and the Chechen, Ingush and Crimean Tatar peoples, whose deportations by Stalin and Aleksey Yermolov he praised and pitied that they "didn't go far enough". In 1996, Limonov spoke on behest of Zhirinovsky's LDPR in the State Duma, advocating against separatism and for Russian unity.

Limonov was also a frequent contributor for scandalous Russian newspaper Novy Vzglyad, where he met and collaborated with queer activist Slava Mogutin, who became his mentee until Mogutin had to leave Russia in 1995.

From 1995 to 1998, Limonov was in a relationship with to the 30 years younger Elisabeth Bleze, daughter of an artist. In 1998, at the age of 55, Limonov met then 16-year-old NBP member Anastasia Lysogor, and lived with her for some time. They split in 2005.

On the Ukrainian Independence Day 24 August 1999, Limonov along with 15 other supporters from the top of the city's clock tower in Sevastopol publicly called to review the status of the city and not to ratify the Treaty about Friendship and Cooperation between Russia and Ukraine by the State Duma.

=== Jail and protest activities, 2001–2013 ===
Limonov and a number of his supporters were arrested in April 2001 at a village in Altai close to the Kazakhi border by the FSB after illegally acquiring weapons and munition. He was jailed on charges of terrorism, the forced overthrow of the constitutional order, and the illegal purchase of weapons. The Russian government accused Limonov of trying to raise a private militia to invade Kazakhstan and incite a popular uprising of the Russian diaspora in the East Kazakhstan Region.

After one year in Lefortovo prison, his trial was heard in a Saratov court, which also heard appeals and pressure from Russian Duma members Vladimir Zhirinovsky, Alexei Mitrofanov and Vasiliy Shandybin for his release. He maintained that the charges were ridiculous and politically motivated, but was convicted and sentenced to four years imprisonment for the arms purchasing, while the other charges were dropped. He served almost two years before being paroled for good behavior. He wrote eight books while in jail. Amnesty International called Limonov a political prisoner.

In 2006, Limonov married the famous actress Yekaterina Volkova. On 7 November 2006, his son Bogdan was born, on 17 July 2008 his daughter Alexandra. Later in 2008, the couple divorced. In later interviews, Volkova described Limonov as intelligent, modest and humorous, but not made for family life.

On 19 April 2007, the Moscow City Court banned the National Bolshevik Party as extremist. The decision was upheld by the Supreme Court.

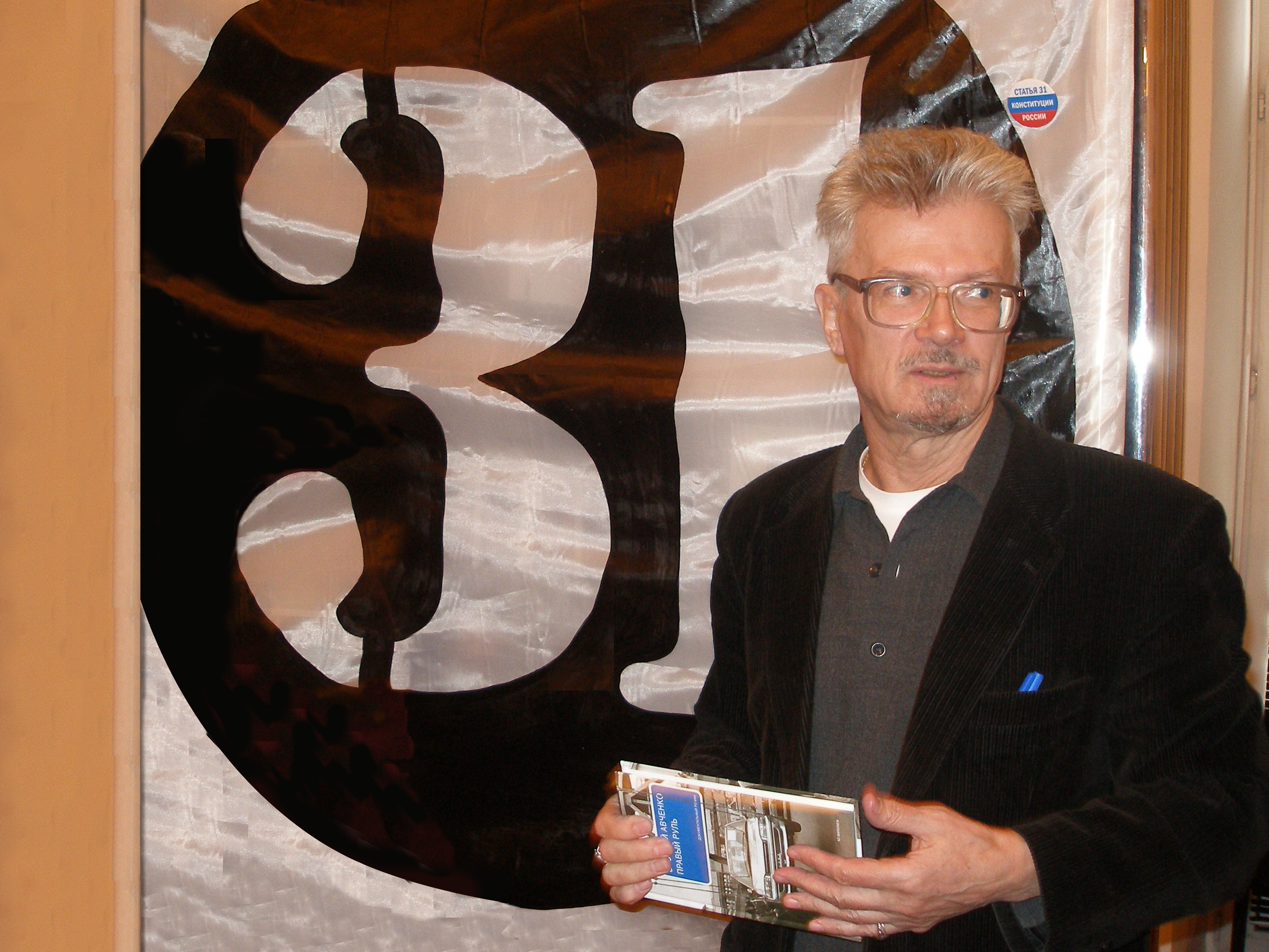
Limonov in front of the Strategy-31 banner, March 2010

Limonov continued his political activities as one of the leaders of The Other Russia, along with liberal, nationalist and communist politicians. He took part in various protests and was one of the organizers of the Dissenters' Marches. In particular, on 3 March 2007, Limonov was detained by police in the very beginning of the rally the first Saint Petersburg Dissenters' March; on 14 April 2007, Limonov was arrested again after an anti-government rally in Moscow; on 31 January 2009 was detained again in Moscow.

Limonov was subject to state harassment and in conflict with Putin-aligned opposition groups such as Nashi, which accused Limonov of fascism and picketed his book signings.

In July 2009, he helped organise the Strategy-31 series of protests.

Soon, Limonov split up with the liberal opposition. In July 2010, he and his followers established The Other Russia political party, as the informal successor to the NBP. It was denied official registration in 2010 and in 2019, after it got re-established without Limonov as formally part of its leadership.

In 2010, Limonov, among other opposition figures, was involved in a kompromat scandal with a woman nicknamed "Katya Mumu".

=== Later life and death, 2013–2020 ===
Starting in 2014, Limonov supported the annexation of Crimea by the Russian Federation and the at the time unrecognized Donetsk People's Republic and Lugansk People's Republic, and encouraged Russians to take part in the Russo-Ukrainian War on the Russian side. He urged for the quick annexation of any Ukrainian territories like Kharkiv, Zaporizhzhia, Kherson, Mykolaiv, Odesa and Dnipropetrovsk before Ukraine joins NATO. Limonov's anticipation of a war in Ukraine goes back as far as 1992.

The Other Russia also created a militia called "Interbrigades" to support the separatist movement in Donbas; they took part in the battles for Sloviansk and Kramatorsk, and also were engaged in the protection of the leader of Limonov during his visit to the Luhansk region. His long standing ban by state owned media was lifted and he appeared on TV multiple times where he gave critical support to Putin and defended his actions in Ukraine.

He died on 17 March 2020, aged 77, in Moscow. It was reported that Limonov had been battling cancer; complications from two surgery procedures such as throat problems, struggles with oncology, and inflammation were cited as the direct cause of his death.

== Literary work ==
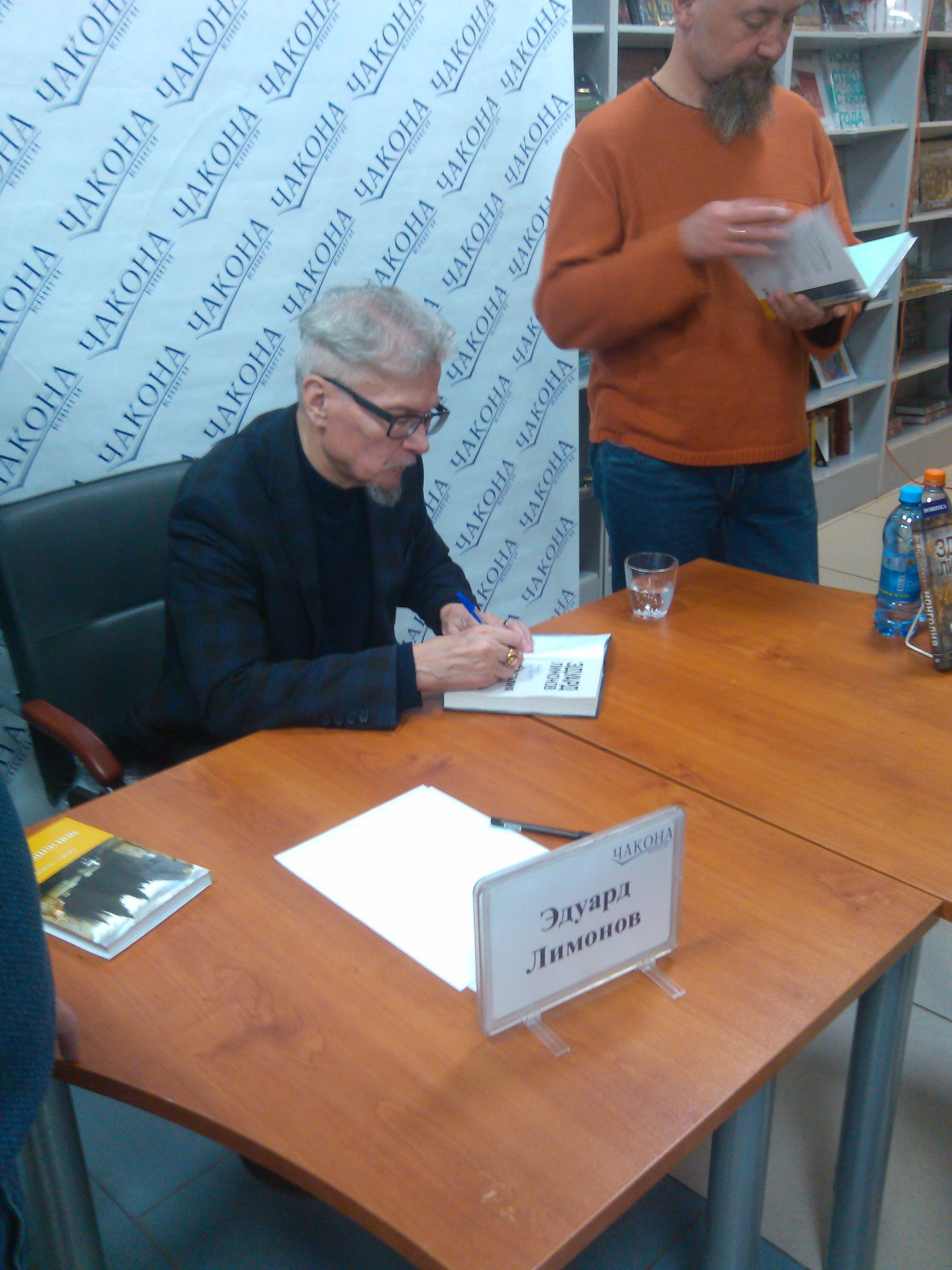
Eduard Limonov in Samara, 2018

Limonov's works are known for their cynicism. His novels are also (to an extent, fictive) memoirs, describing his experiences as a youth in Russia and as an émigré in the United States.

Limonov stated that his favorite poet was Velimir Khlebnikov. He was also influenced by Russian avant-garde poets like Daniil Kharms and Vladimir Mayakovsky. The Japanese writer Yukio Mishima and French novelist Louis-Ferdinand Céline are also noted, by some observers, as an influence on Limonov's writing.

Limonov was inspired by the postmodernism, avant-gardism, iconoclasm and situationism of the 1960s and 1970s. The first English poetry Limonov translated in his exile in New York were lyrics written by Lou Reed from The Velvet Underground. He also was fascinated by the emerging punk scene, citing the Sex Pistols, The Clash and Richard Hell as his favourites, which led to his lifelong fascination for misfits, non-conformists and skinheads.

Limonov's works were scandalous for the Russian public, once they began to be published in the USSR during the late perestroika era. Particularly noted is It's Me, Eddie, which contained numerous pornographic descriptions of homosexual acts involving the narrator. The author later argued that such scenes were purely fiction; however, his fellow Russian nationalists were nevertheless appalled by such descriptions in Limonov's work. Thus, the Neo-Nazi leader Alexander Barkashov remarked to a journalist of Komsomolskaya Pravda concerning Limonov: "Если лидер педераст, то он родину продаст." ("If the leader is a pederast, he will betray the fatherland.")

Russian film director and screenwriter Alexander Veledinsky's 2004 feature film It's Russian is based on Limonov's writings. In late 1990s and early 2000s, Limonov was a regular contributor to "Living Here" and later to the eXile, both English-language newspapers in Moscow. These were the only known sources where Limonov wrote articles in English. When he joined as a contributor, he specifically asked the editors of the paper that they preserve his "terrible Russian-English style." Although most of his featured articles were political, he also wrote on many topics, including "advice for ambitious youngsters."

Emmanuel Carrère described Limonov as a "groovy amalgam" of Michel Houellebecq, Lou Reed and Daniel Cohn-Bendit and compared him to Travis Bickle from Taxi Driver.

Due to amendments made to the Russian anti-LGBTQ law in 2022, Limonov's works were put on a list of books that were to be removed from libraries and book stores.

== Works about Limonov ==
Eduard Limonov's life is related in detail by Emmanuel Carrère in his 2011 biographical novel Limonov and in the Adam Curtis documentary series Can't Get You Out of My Head. English actor Ben Whishaw portrayed Limonov in Limonov: The Ballad, a film by Kirill Serebrennikov based on Carrère's novel. Magne-Håvard Brekke portrayed Limonov in the 2025 movie The Wizard of the Kremlin.

== Selected bibliography ==
=== Books ===
- It's Me, Eddie
- His Butler's Story, first published in English by Grove Press, 1987. Translated by Judson Rosengrant
- Memoir of a Russian Punk, Grove Weidenfeld, 1990. Translated by Judson Rosengrant
- Молодой Нeгодяй (A Young Scoundrel), translated by John Dolan
- My Political Biography
- (English), translated by Sofia Arenzon
- Russian Psycho
- Control Shot
- The Holy Monsters
- Imprisoned by Dead Men
- (English), translated by Sofia Arenzon
- The Book of Water
- The Wild Girl
- American Vacation
- The Great Mother of Love
- Anatomy of a Hero
- Disappearance of Barbarians
- How to be Mad and Happy at Fifty-Five

=== Interview ===
- Eduard Limonov: Each year I get closer to Islam
- Limonov's dialogue with a Voice about Thanksgiving
- Eduard Limonov: It's a Great Time of Struggle

=== Essays ===
- Doctor Limonov's advices to ambitious youngsters
- Punk and national-bolshevism
- Foreword of The Exile: Sex, Drugs, and Libel in the New Russia

== Filmography ==
=== Documentaries ===
- Saratov (2003)
- Da, smert (2004), by Alyona Polunina
- The Revolution That Wasn't (2008), by Alyona Polunina
- Srok (2012), by Alexey Pivovarov, Pavel Kostomarov and Alexander Rastorguev
- Eduard Limonov (2026), by Natalia Gugueva

=== Films ===
- Russkoe (2004), by Alexander Veledinsky – screening of several Limonov's novels

== See also ==
- Aleksandr Dugin
- Yegor Letov
