= The Wizard of the Kremlin (film) =

2025 political thriller film

- Theatrical release poster
- French: Le Mage du Kremlin
- Directed by: Olivier Assayas
- Screenplay by: Olivier Assayas; Emmanuel Carrère
- Based on: The Wizard of the Kremlin by Giuliano da Empoli
- Produced by: Olivier Delbosc; Sidonie Dumas
- Starring: Paul Dano; Alicia Vikander; Tom Sturridge; Will Keen; Jeffrey Wright; Jude Law
- Cinematography: Yorick Le Saux
- Edited by: Marion Monnier
- Production companies: Curiosa Films; Gaumont; France 2 Cinéma
- Distributed by: Gaumont
- Release dates: 31 August 2025 (Venice); 21 January 2026 (France)
- Running time: 145 minutes (Note: The runtime depends on the festival and country of release. The original runtime for the Venice Film Festival premiere is 156 minutes. The final runtime for the French theatrical cut is 145 minutes, while the American and British theatrical cut runs for 136 minutes.)
- Country: France
- Language: English
- Box office: $8 million

The Wizard of the Kremlin (French: Le Mage du Kremlin) is a 2025 English-language French political satire film directed by Olivier Assayas, who co-wrote the screenplay with Emmanuel Carrère. It is based on the 2022 novel by Giuliano da Empoli. It follows the fictional government official Vadim Baranov (Paul Dano) during the final years of the Soviet Union and the turbulent start of the Russian Federation, while a young Vladimir Putin (Jude Law) rises to power. It also stars Alicia Vikander, Will Keen, Tom Sturridge and Jeffrey Wright.

The Wizard of the Kremlin had its world premiere in the main competition of the 82nd Venice International Film Festival on 31 August 2025, where it was nominated for the Golden Lion. The film received mixed reviews from critics, who praised the performances, but criticized the pacing, story, and characters.

== Premise ==
Vadim Baranov morphs from a young artist in 1990s Russia into an influential government official and spin doctor at the heart of the government.

== Cast ==
- Paul Dano as Vadim Baranov (inspired by Vladislav Surkov)
- Jude Law as Vladimir Putin (nicknamed the 'tsar')
- Alicia Vikander as Ksenia
- Will Keen as Boris Berezovsky
- Tom Sturridge as Dmitri Sidorov
- Jeffrey Wright as Rowland
- Kaspars Kambala as Alexander Zaldostanov
- Andris Keišs as Yevgeny Prigozhin
- Magne-Håvard Brekke as Eduard Limonov
- Matthew Baunsgard as Larry
- Dan Cade as Agent Johnson

== Production ==
The film is directed by Olivier Assayas and is an adaptation by Assayas and Emmanuel Carrère of the novel The Wizard of the Kremlin by Giuliano da Empoli, published in French in April 2022. It is produced by Curiosa Films and Gaumont in co-production with France 2 Cinéma.

Paul Dano, Jude Law, Alicia Vikander, Zach Galifianakis and Tom Sturridge were reported to be leading the cast in May 2024 with Dano cast as the fictional Russian political advisor Vadim Baranov. In January 2025, it was announced that Law would portray Vladimir Putin. Filming took place in March 2025 in Riga, Latvia, as it is a common practice for Hollywood and Western European films to film films set in Russia outside of said country to "double" for Russia, due to tax incentives and safety issues.

== Release ==
In February 2026, Vertical acquired North American rights to the film and it was released on May 15, 2026.

== Reception ==
=== Critical response ===
On the review aggregator website Rotten Tomatoes, 44% of 127 critics' reviews are positive, with an average rating of 5.8/10. The website's consensus reads: "A dryly witty yet overwrought slow burner, The Wizard of the Kremlin can't overcome its thin characters, sluggish pacing, and repetitive storytelling." Metacritic, which uses a weighted average, assigned the film a score of 56 out of 100, based on 34 critics, indicating "mixed or average" reviews.

Geoffrey Macnab of The Independent stated that the film is "...very short on emotional heft – its characters are sketchily drawn, and Vadim is a strangely aloof figure, his motivations impossible to fathom." Wendy Ide of The Observer wrote, "Law is terrific, and there’s a choking sense of ominous tension whenever he’s on screen. Unfortunately, he’s not on camera nearly enough to justify The Wizard of the Kremlin’s overlong runtime, stodgy pacing and other considerable issues." Jonathan Romney of Screen International wrote, "A screenplay dense with incident and ideological discussion is carried efficiently by fast-moving, sleek direction and sumptuous mise en scène that catches the tone of a changing society and its sudden explosion of capitalist excess." Robbie Collin of The Daily Telegraph called the film "...smart and watchable in a miniseries sort of way."

=== Accolades ===
Award	Date of ceremony	Category	Recipient(s)	Result	Ref.
Cinema for Peace Awards	16 February 2026	Cinema for Peace Dove for The Most Valuable Film of the Year	The Wizard of the Kremlin	Nominated	
Venice International Film Festival	6 September 2025	Golden Lion	Olivier Assayas	Nominated	

== See also ==
- Political thriller
- Sovereign democracy
- Vladislav Surkov
