= Vladislav Surkov =

Russian politician (born 1964)

- Владислав Сурков
- Surkov in 2011

Assistant to the President of Russia
- In office 20 September 2013 – 18 February 2020
- Preceded by: Tatyana Golikova

Deputy Prime Minister of Russia
- In office 27 December 2011 – 8 May 2013
- Prime Minister: Vladimir Putin; Dmitry Medvedev
- Preceded by: Vyacheslav Volodin
- Succeeded by: Sergei Prikhodko

First Deputy Kremlin Chief of Staff
- In office 15 May 2008 – 27 December 2011
- President: Dmitry Medvedev
- Preceded by: Dmitry Kozak
- Succeeded by: Vyacheslav Volodin

Deputy Kremlin Chief of Staff
- In office 3 August 1999 – 12 May 2008
- President: Boris Yeltsin; Vladimir Putin
- Preceded by: Sergei Zverev
- Succeeded by: Alexey Gromov

Personal details
- Born: 21 September 1964 (age 62) Solntsevo, Lipetsk Oblast, Soviet Union
- Party: United Russia
- Spouse(s): Yulia Vishnevskaya (m. 1987; div. 1996) Nataliya Dubovitskaya (m. 2004)
- Children: 4
- Education: International University in Moscow
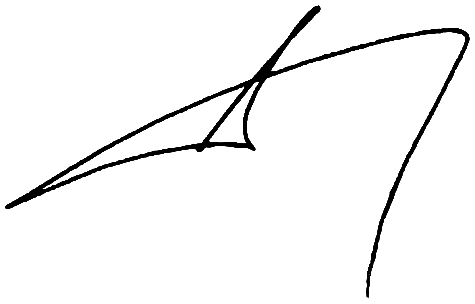
- Signature

Vladislav Yuryevich Surkov (Russian: Владислав Юрьевич Сурков; born 21 September 1964) is a Russian politician and businessman.

He served as First Deputy Chief of Staff of the Presidential Administration of Russia from 1999 to 2011, where he played a central role in shaping domestic political strategy. During this period, he was widely credited with formulating and promoting the concept of sovereign democracy.

From December 2011 to May 2013, Surkov was Deputy Prime Minister of Russia, later returning to the Presidential Executive Office as a close aide to Vladimir Putin. Between 2013 and 2020, he was responsible for overseeing Russian policy toward Abkhazia, South Ossetia, and Ukraine. He was dismissed from this role in February 2020.

Surkov has been described as an influential political strategist and is sometimes referred to as a "grey cardinal" of Russian politics. He has also been linked to literary works published under the pseudonym Nathan Dubovitsky.

== Early years ==
According to Surkov's official biography and birth certificate, he was born on 21 September 1964 in Solntsevo, Lipetsk Oblast, Russian SFSR. As per other statements, he was born in 1962 in Shali, Checheno-Ingush ASSR. His birth name is sometimes reported to be Aslambek Dudayev. His parents, including Russian mother, Zinaida Antonovna Surkova (born 1935), and Chechen father, Andarbek (Yuri) Danilbekovich Dudayev (1942–2014), were school teachers in Duba-yurt, Checheno-Ingush ASSR.

Following the separation of his parents, his mother moved to Lipetsk in the Russian SFSR, where he was baptized as a Russian Orthodox Christian. In an interview published in June 2005 in the German magazine Der Spiegel, Surkov stated that his father was an ethnic Chechen and that he spent the first five years of his life in Chechnya, living in Duba-yurt and Grozny. Surkov has also claimed to be a relative of Dzhokhar Dudayev, the first president of the Chechen Republic of Ichkeria.

From 1982 to 1983, Surkov attended MISIS, but did not graduate. From 1983 to 1985, Surkov served in a Soviet artillery regiment in Hungary, according to his official biography. However, former defence minister Sergei Ivanov stated in a 2006 TV interview that Surkov served in the Main Intelligence Directorate of the General Staff (GRU) during the same time period.

After his military service, Surkov attended the Moscow Institute of Culture on a five-year program in theater direction, but withdrew after only three years. Surkov graduated from Moscow International University with a master's degree in economics in the late 1990s.

== Business career (1988–1998) ==
In the late 1980s, when the Communist Party of the Soviet Union lifted its ban on private businesses, Surkov started out as an entrepreneur. In 1987, he became head of the advertising department of Mikhail Khodorkovsky's businesses. From 1991 to April 1996, he held key managerial positions in advertising and PR departments of Khodorkovsky's Bank Menatep. From March 1996 to February 1997, he was at Rosprom, and from February 1997 with Mikhail Fridman's Alfa-Bank. At Alfa-Bank, he worked closely with Oleg Govorun.

In September 2004, Surkov was elected president of the board of directors of the oil products transportation company Transnefteproduct, but was instructed by Russia's then-prime minister, Mikhail Fradkov, to resign in February 2006.

== Political career (1999–2020) ==
After a brief career as a public relations director at the television channel ORT from 1998 to 1999, Surkov was appointed Deputy Chief of Staff of the Presidential Administration of Russia in 1999. According to the Dossier Center, he has supported far-right groups since at least 2000.

Early in his tenure, Surkov often appeared in public and international media as a spokesperson for the Kremlin. In August 2000, he confirmed that Gazprom would acquire Vladimir Gusinsky's Media-Most, then the owner of NTV, Russia's only nationwide independent television channel. In September 2002, he announced that the Kremlin would not reinstate the statue of KGB founder Felix Dzerzhinsky, which had been removed during the collapse of the Soviet Union in 1991. After the 2003 State Duma election, when United Russia won 37.6% of the vote, Surkov said: "We are living in a new Russia now."

In March 2004, he was additionally appointed aide to the president.

Since 2006, Surkov has promoted a political doctrine he called sovereign democracy, intended as a response to democracy-promotion efforts by the United States and the European Union. Western media often described the doctrine as controversial, while Russian media and much of the political elite generally endorsed it. Surkov described the concept as a distinct Russian political language for use in relations with the outside world.

As a leading advocate of sovereign democracy, Surkov gave two major speeches in 2006: Sovereignty is a Political Synonym of Competitiveness in February and Our Russian Model of Democracy is Titled Sovereign Democracy in June.

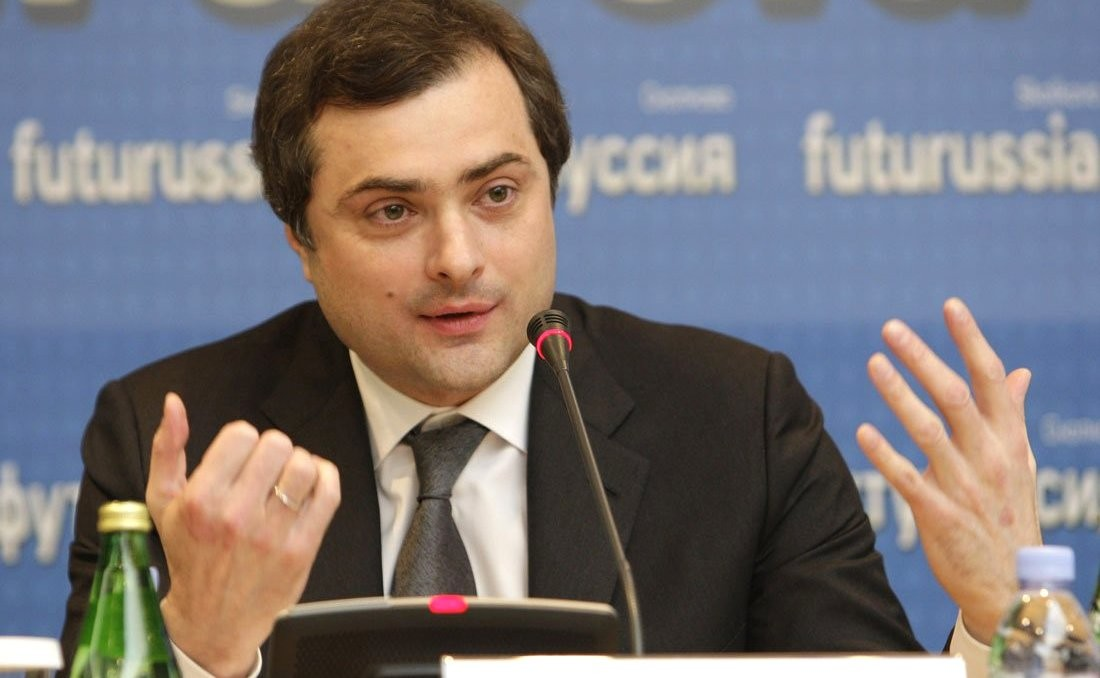
Surkov in April 2010

On 8 February 2007, Moscow State University marked the 125th anniversary of U.S. President Franklin D. Roosevelt's birth with a conference titled "Lessons of the New Deal for Modern Russia and the World", attended by Surkov and political consultant Gleb Pavlovsky. Surkov compared Roosevelt's policies to those of President Putin, describing the New Deal as a potential model for modern Russia. Pavlovsky suggested that Putin should follow Roosevelt's example and seek a third presidential term.

According to The Moscow Times, Surkov influenced the appointment of Ramzan Kadyrov as acting Head of the Chechen Republic on 15 February 2007. Kadyrov has served multiple consecutive terms as head of Chechnya and has been widely accused of human rights abuses.

In October 2009, Surkov warned that opening and modernizing Russia's political system—a reform agenda stressed by President Dmitry Medvedev—could lead to instability that "could rip Russia apart".

In September 2011, Mikhail Prokhorov resigned from the Right Cause party after five months as its leader. He described the party as a puppet of the Kremlin and called Surkov the "main puppet master of the political process" (главным кукловодом политического процесса), according to Korrespondent, as reported by The New York Times. The Kremlin responded that Surkov would remain in his role. At that time, Reuters described Surkov as the Kremlin's "shadowy chief political strategist", one of the most powerful men in the government and a close ally of then–Prime Minister Putin.

=== Deputy Prime Minister for Economic Modernisation (2011–2013) ===
On 27 December 2011, President Dmitry Medvedev reassigned Surkov to the post of Deputy Prime Minister for Economic Modernisation, a move widely interpreted as a consequence of the disputed 2011 parliamentary elections. Reflecting on his career at the time, Surkov stated: among those who helped Boris Yeltsin to secure a peaceful transfer of power; among those who helped President Putin stabilize the political system; among those who helped President Medvedev liberalize it. All the teams were great."

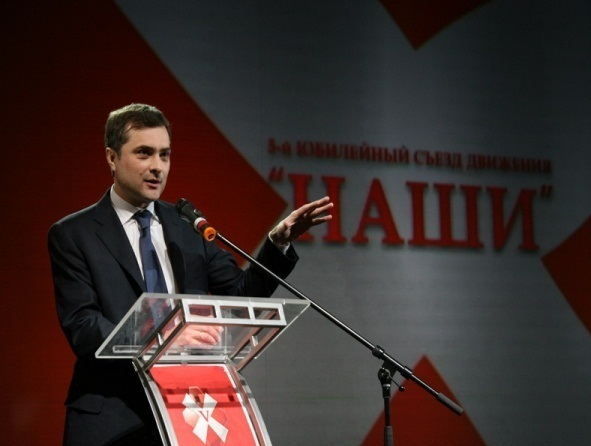
Surkov speaking at the Fifth Congress of the Nashi Youth Movement

During this period, Surkov was involved in supporting pro-government youth movements, including Nashi. He met with movement leaders and participants several times and delivered lectures on the political situation. Nashi has been described by journalist Edward Lucas as the Kremlin's equivalent of the Soviet-era Komsomol.

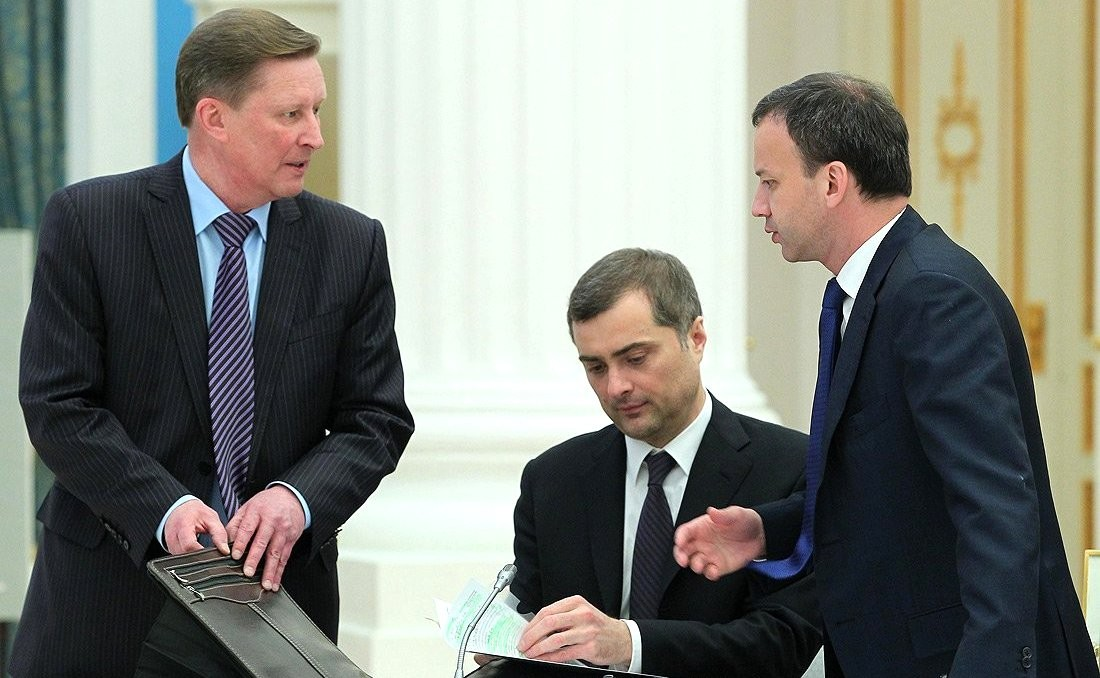
Surkov on his last day as deputy prime minister, with Sergei Ivanov and Arkady Dvorkovich

Following Vladimir Putin's return to the presidency in 2012, commentators noted that Surkov became increasingly marginalized as Putin shifted toward more direct repression rather than the political management associated with Surkov. As deputy prime minister, Surkov criticized the Investigative Committee of Russia for pursuing cases against opposition leaders, arguing such matters should fall under the prosecutor general's office. The Committee announced that he had offered to resign on 7 May 2013, while Surkov himself said he submitted his resignation on 28 April 2013. Putin accepted his resignation on 8 May 2013.

=== Personal adviser to Putin (2013–2020) ===
On 20 September 2013, Putin appointed Surkov as an aide in the Presidential Executive Office, with responsibilities relating to Abkhazia, South Ossetia, and Ukraine. His work immediately centered on developments in Ukraine during the November 2013 Euromaidan protests and the February 2014 Revolution of Dignity.

Surkov had earlier been described as the Kremlin's "Éminence grise" or "Grey Cardinal" for shaping the concept of "sovereign democracy" and overseeing state media propaganda.

On 17 March 2014, one day after the Crimean referendum, Surkov was among the first eleven Russian officials sanctioned by the United States. The measures, enacted through the Specially Designated Nationals List (SDN), froze any US assets and barred entry to the United States. (Note: The individuals listed in March 2014 included Sergey Aksyonov, Sergey Glazyev, Andrei Klishas, Vladimir Konstantinov, Valentina Matviyenko, Victor Medvedchuk, Yelena Mizulina, Dmitry Rogozin, Leonid Slutsky, Vladislav Surkov, and Victor Yanukovich.) Surkov dismissed the sanctions, stating: "The only things that interest me in the US are Tupac Shakur, Allen Ginsberg, and Jackson Pollock. I don't need a visa to access their work."

On 21 March 2014, the European Union also added Surkov to its sanctions list, barring him from entry and freezing his EU-based assets.

In February 2015, Ukraine's security service (SBU) accused Surkov of coordinating snipers responsible for killings during the January 2014 protests. The Russian government rejected these claims as "absurd".

Despite being under EU sanctions, Surkov joined Putin's delegation to Mount Athos in Greece in May 2016.

Academic research has highlighted Surkov's central role in efforts to promote a "Novorossiya" identity in eastern Ukraine, which largely failed to take root.

=== 2016 email leaks ===
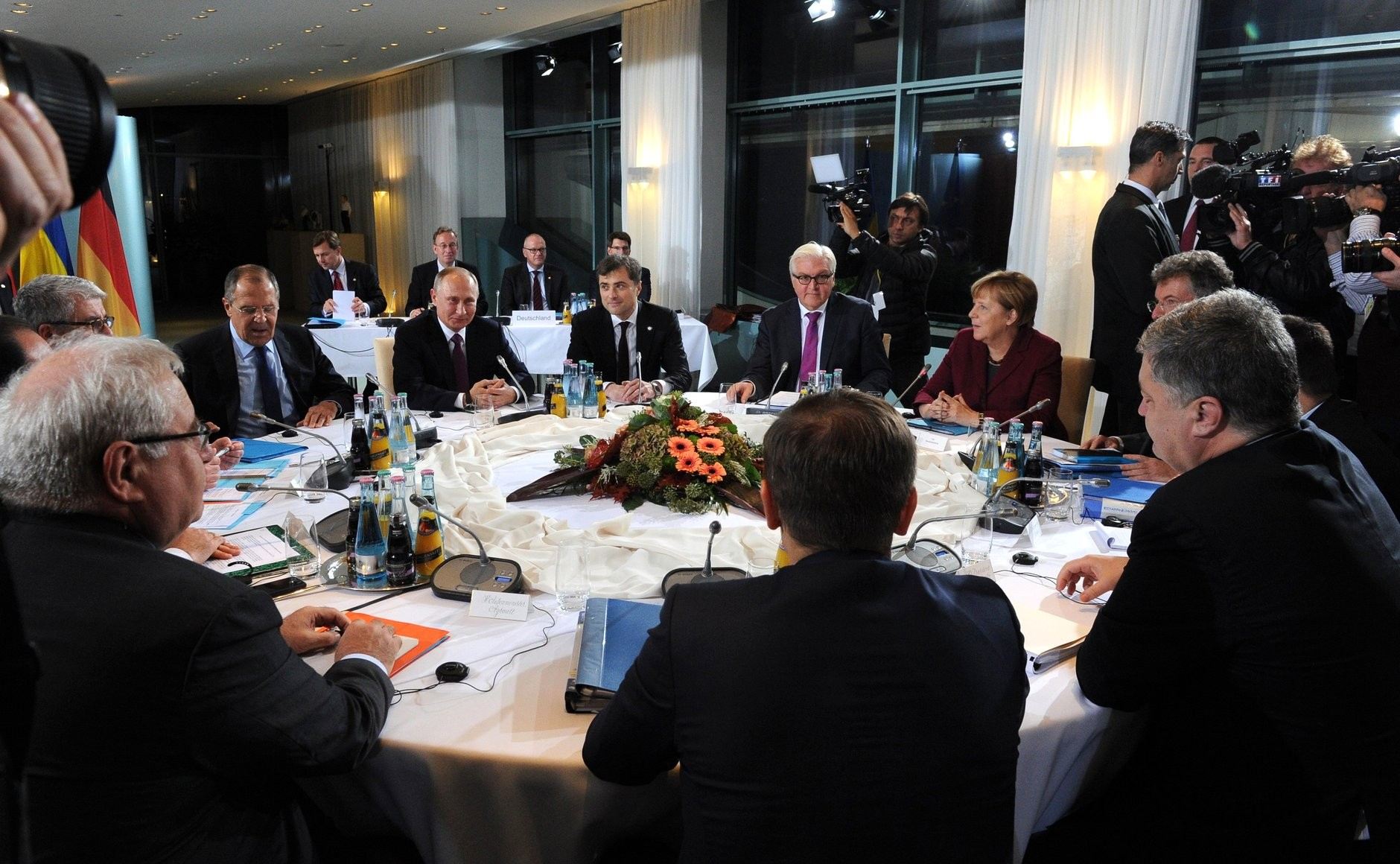
The "Normandy Format" talks in October 2016, with Surkov between Putin and Frank-Walter Steinmeier

In October 2016, the Ukrainian hacker group CyberHunta released over a gigabyte of emails and documents alleged to belong to Surkov. According to the Atlantic Council's Digital Forensic Research Lab, the 2,337 emails came from the official government account "prm_surkova". The Kremlin dismissed the documents as forgeries.

Media outlets reported that the correspondence described Russian efforts to destabilize Ukraine and coordination with opposition leaders in separatist-held areas of eastern Ukraine. Among the leaked material was a document sent by Denis Pushilin, then chairman of the People's Council of the Donetsk People's Republic, listing casualties between 26 May and 6 June 2014. Another file outlined a 22-page plan to support nationalist and separatist politicians and to push for early parliamentary elections in Ukraine, with the stated aim of undermining the government in Kyiv.

=== Removal from office ===
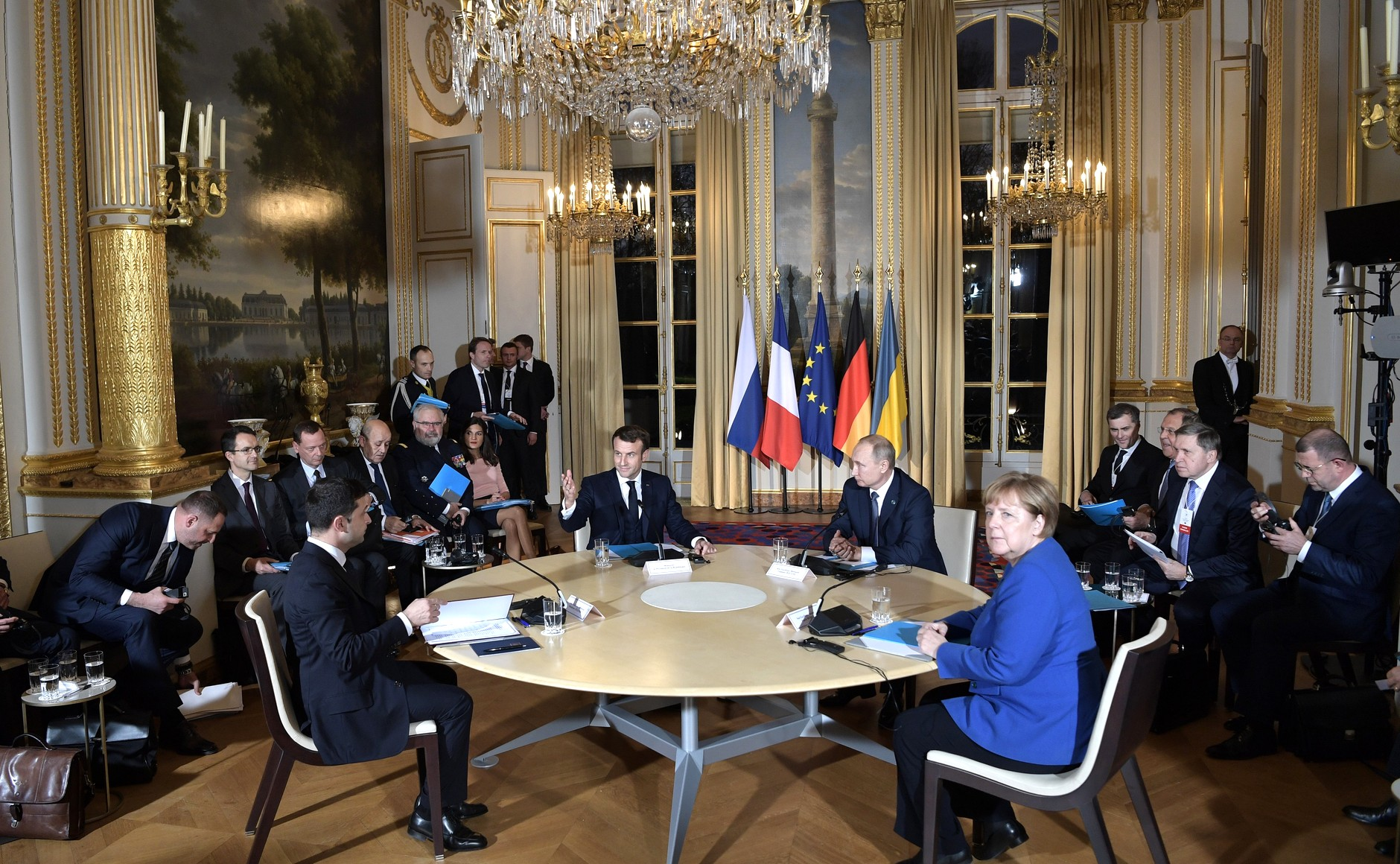
The "Normandy Format" talks in October 2019, with Surkov next to Sergei Lavrov

On 11 February 2019, Surkov published an article in Nezavisimaya Gazeta titled "The Long State of Putin", in which he outlined his concept of "Putinism". The article was widely covered in Russian and international media.

On 18 February 2020, Surkov was dismissed as presidential adviser. A week later, he told Actualnye kommentarii that he had resigned on his own initiative, echoing reasons cited earlier by journalists Vladimir Solovyev and Alexei Venediktov. He said that he had focused mainly on Donbas and Ukraine, but that the "context" had changed. In the same interview, he stated that "There is no Ukraine" and argued that "coercion to fraternal relations by force is the only method that has historically proven its effectiveness in the Ukrainian direction".

== House arrest reports (2022) ==
In April 2022, during the Russian invasion of Ukraine, Surkov was reported to be under house arrest on allegations of embezzling funds intended for the Donbas separatist region.

== Criticism ==
Surkov has been the subject of criticism from politicians, activists, and media throughout his career.

In 2007, a report by the Open Source Center identified the Russian news site ura.ru as reportedly having links to him.

Before the 2010 U.S.–Russia "Civil Society to Civil Society" summit, U.S. Representative Ileana Ros-Lehtinen (R–FL-27) led a petition urging the Obama administration to suspend participation until Surkov was replaced as a Russian delegate. In an interview with Radio Free Europe/Radio Liberty, she described him as "one of the main propagators of limiting freedom of speech in Russia, intimidating Russian journalists and representatives of opposition political parties". The summit nevertheless went ahead.

That same year, inside Russia, human rights activist Lyudmila Alexeyeva appealed to President Dmitry Medvedev to dismiss Surkov. In November, opposition leaders Boris Nemtsov, Vladimir Milov, and Vladimir Ryzhkov also demanded his resignation, citing policies they said threatened press freedom.

After Surkov's dismissal as Deputy Prime Minister in May 2013, The Economist described him as the architect of "a system of make-believe", involving imitation political parties, stage-managed media, and orchestrated social movements. Between 2013 and 2014, writer Peter Pomerantsev published a series of essays in The Atlantic, The New York Times, and the London Review of Books describing Surkov as "Putin's chief ideologue" with "unsurpassed influence over Russian politics". He argued that Surkov had reduced Russian politics to "postmodernist theatre". In an October 2013 lecture at the Legatum Institute, Pomerantsev and Pavel Khodorkovsky went further, calling Russia a "postmodern dictatorship".

In 2014, Igor Strelkov, a leader in the war in the Donbass, referred to Surkov as "notorious", claiming he focused "only on destruction ... in South Ossetia and other regions where he engaged in looting rather than aid".

=== Pseudonym "Natan Dubovitsky" ===
In August 2009, the business newspaper Vedomosti reported that Surkov was widely believed to be the author of the novel Close to Zero (Околоноля), published under the pseudonym Natan Dubovitsky in Russian Pioneer. The pseudonym closely resembles the surname of Surkov's wife, Natalya Dubovitskaya. In a later edition of the book, Surkov contributed a preface under his own name in which he appeared to both distance himself from and praise the work, describing its author as "an unoriginal Hamlet-obsessed hack" while also calling it "the best book I have ever read".

The novel, subtitled "gangsta fiction", satirizes public relations, corruption, and publishing culture in Russia. A stage adaptation directed by Kirill Serebrennikov premiered in January 2011, which Surkov attended. Critics offered divergent views: Peter Pomerantsev described it as "exactly the sort of book Surkov's youth groups burn on Red Square", while The Economist argued that it "exposed the vices of the system [Surkov] himself had created".

Additional works published under the name Natan Dubovitsky in Russian Pioneer include The Little Car and the Bicycle [gaga saga] (2012), Uncle Vanya [cover version] (2014), Without Sky (2014), and Ultranormality (2017).

=== Influence outside Russia ===
Surkov's political style has drawn attention outside Russia. In 2011, Peter Pomerantsev described him in the London Review of Books as central to a system of "ceaseless shape-shifting" designed to confuse and weaken opposition. In the 2016 BBC documentary HyperNormalisation, filmmaker Adam Curtis argued that Surkov's blend of politics and theatre offered a model later mirrored in the rise of Donald Trump. Around the same time, journalist Ned Resnikoff likewise highlighted the "phantasmagoric" nature of Surkov's techniques.

In 2019, Surkov himself declared that "Russia is playing with the West's minds", adding that "they don't know how to deal with their own changed consciousness". The same year, Japanese scholar Sanshiro Hosaka analyzed leaked emails in a study of Surkov's "political technology" and its role in the war in Donbas.

In a 2021 interview with the Financial Times, journalist Henry Foy described Surkov as "a founding father of Putinism", crediting him with stage-managing the 2014 annexation of Crimea and Russia's involvement in eastern Ukraine. Surkov said he was "proud that I was part of the reconquest [of Ukraine]" and compared Putin with Octavian. He also argued that "an overdose of freedom is lethal to a state".

Most people need their heads to be filled with thoughts. You are not going to feed people with some highly intellectual discourse ... Generally most people consume very simple-meaning beliefs. This is normal. There is haute cuisine, and there is McDonald's. Everyone takes advantage of such people all over the world.

Surkov was the inspiration for the fictional character Vadim Baranov in the 2022 French novel The Wizard of the Kremlin by Giuliano da Empoli; the character was played by Paul Dano in the 2025 film adaptation.

== Personal life ==
Surkov has married twice. His first marriage, to Yulia Petrovna Vishnevskaya (Russian: Юлия Петровна Вишневская, née Lukoyanova, Лукоянова) in 1987, ended in divorce in 1996. In his second marriage, Surkov married Natalya Dubovitskaya (Russian: Наталия Дубовицкая), his secretary when he was an executive at the Menatep bank, in a civil ceremony in 2004.

Surkov has four children.

Surkov has composed songs and written texts for the Russian rock-musician Vadim Samoylov, ex-member of the band Agata Kristi (Russian: Агата Кристи). He speaks English and is fond of poets of the Beat Generation such as Allen Ginsberg.

== Honours and awards ==
- Order of Merit for the Fatherland, 3rd class (13 November 2003) – for outstanding contribution to strengthening Russian statehood and many years of diligent work
- Gratitude of the President of the Russian Federation (18 January 2010, 12 June 2004 and 8 July 2003) – for active participation in the preparation of the President's address to the Federal Assembly of the Russian Federation
- Medal of PA Stolypin, 2nd class (21 September 2011)
- Diploma of the Central Election Commission of the Russian Federation (2 April 2008) – for active support and substantial assistance in organizing and conducting the elections of the President of the Russian Federation
- State Councillor of the Russian Federation, 1st class

== See also ==
- Mikhail Lesin
