= Ilsky =

Ilsky Ильский
- Urban-type settlement
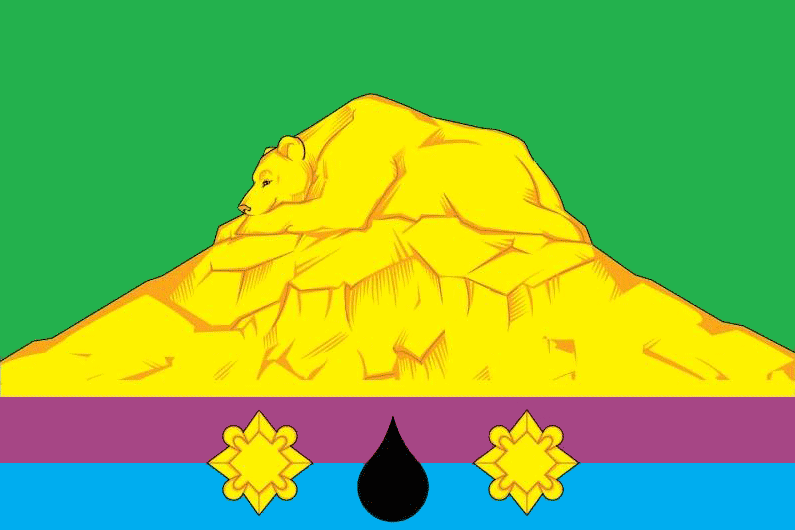
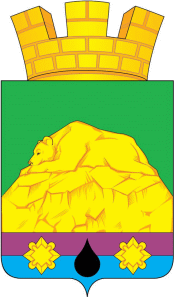
- Flag Coat of arms
- Interactive map of Ilsky
- Location of Ilsky Ilsky (Krasnodar Krai)
- Coordinates: 44.8548°N 38.5705°E
- Country: Russia
- Federal subject: Krasnodar Krai
- Administrative district: Seversky District
- Founded: 1863
- Elevation: 63 m (207 ft)

Population (2010 Census)
  - Total: 23,781
  - Estimate (2025): 25,125 (+5.7%)
- Time zone: UTC+3 (MSK)
- Postal code: 353230–353232
- OKTMO ID: 03643155051

Ilsky (Russian: И́льский) is an urban locality (an urban-type settlement) in Seversky District of Krasnodar Krai, Russia. Population: 26,359 (2020), 23,781 (2010 census); 22,323 (2002 census); 19,077 (1989 Soviet census).

The village of Ilskaya was founded before all other settlements of the Seversky district. On June 16, 1863, by order of the commander of the troops of the Caucasian Army, the combined squadron of the Seversky Dragoon Regiment began to build a village called Ilskaya, the name is given on the Il River. Already on June 27, 1863, the first batch of Cossack settlers appeared. This date was considered the day of the founding of the village.

The Ilsky oil refinery receives crude via the Transneft oil pipeline.
