= The Wizard of the Kremlin =

2022 novel by Giuliano da Empoli

- Book cover in French original, Le mage du Kremlin (2022)
- Author: Giuliano da Empoli
- Original title: Le mage du Kremlin
- Language: French
- Genre: Novel
- Publisher: Éditions Gallimard
- Publication date: April 2022
- Pages: 288
- ISBN: 2072958164

The Wizard of the Kremlin (French: Le mage du Kremlin) is the debut novel by Giuliano da Empoli, published in French in April 2022 by Éditions Gallimard, and in English in 2023 by Pushkin Press then Other Press. It won the 2022 Grand prix du roman de l'Académie française and was a finalist for the Prix Goncourt, which was awarded to Vivre vite by Brigitte Giraud.

== Summary ==
The author recounts his imagined meeting, one night in Moscow, with the enigmatic Vadim Baranov, once an artist, producer of reality TV shows, and éminence grise of Vladimir Putin, nicknamed "the Tsar". Retired from business at the time of the story, Baranov recounts his youth, his life in 1990s Russia, his contribution to the political rise of "the Tsar" from 1999 and his experience of power, the central theme of the book.

== Realist elements ==
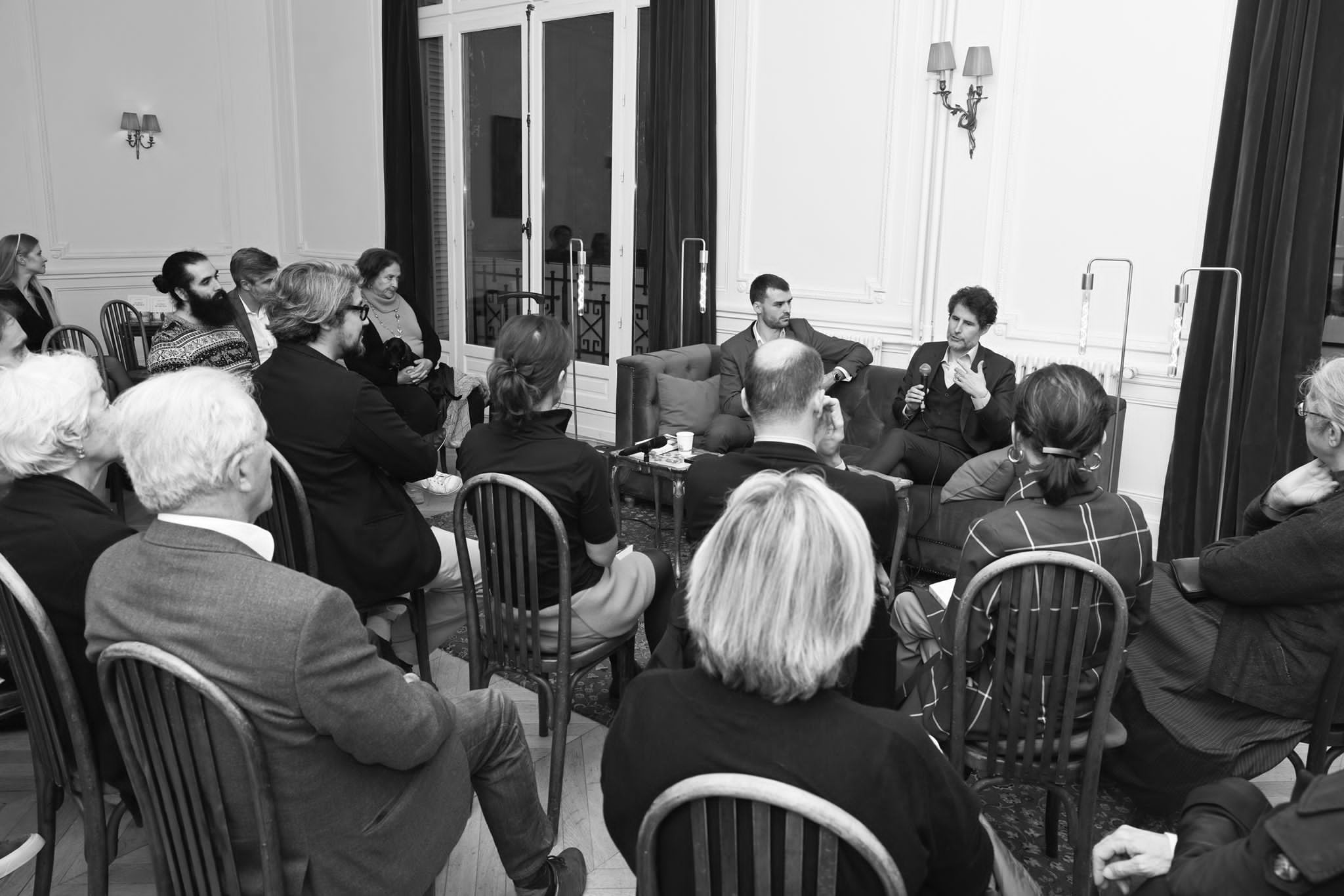
Author Giuliano da Empoli presents The Wizard of the Kremlin as part of the literary salon of the Conservatoire Rachmaninoff hosted by Erwan Barillot in October 2022.

=== Character inspired by Vladislav Surkov ===
The main character of the plot, Vadim Baranov, is fictional, but he shares many common traits with Russian politician Vladislav Surkov, whose atypical profile—rap lover, avant-garde theater director, writer and businessman—prompted The New York Times to call him one of Russia's "most intriguing figures". Like Baranov, Surkov was Vladimir Putin's man in the shadows, "a poet among wolves", according to Marianne.

It was while carrying out research for his previous work, The Engineers of Chaos (French: "Les ingénieurs du chaos"), an essay devoted to the advisers of populist leaders, that da Empoli became familiar with the figure of Vladislav Surkov, to whom he wished to devote a novel. "He is so romantic that he freed me and pushed me to become a novelist", explains the author, who also confides that he has never met him in person.

=== Vladimir Putin ===
The novel draws on many historical facts, many of which feature Vladimir Putin, one of the novel's central characters. His arrival comes amid demands for authority sparked by the chaos of the 1990s in Russia. “[Russians] had grown up in the countryside and suddenly found themselves in a supermarket,” says Giuliano da Empoli through Baranov.

Advised by Baranov, "the Tsar" responds to this demand for authority during historical events such as the Second Chechen War, the presidential election of 2000, the sinking of the Kursk, the hostage-taking of the Moscow theater in 2002 or even the Orange Revolution in 2004. "In The Wizard of the Kremlin, we follow Putin's metamorphosis", summarizes the journalist Laure Adler. For Marc Lambron, da Empoli's novel is "an oral fresco running from the Yeltsin years to the beginnings of the current war in Ukraine".

The character of Vladimir Putin is portrayed through the eyes of Vadim Baranov, the novel's exclusive narrator from chapter 3.

=== Other real characters present in the novel ===
Besides Putin, many characters who really existed are protagonists. Boris Berezovsky, businessman and television mogul, is Baranov's employer. He introduces him for the first time to Putin, then lieutenant-colonel of the FSB (ex-KGB), at the Lubyanka headquarters. Berezovsky's depression and suicide following his disgrace are also depicted. The oligarch Mikhail Khodorkovsky features prominently in the novel: he courts and marries Baranov's concubine before being arrested for fraud in 2003, consistent with historical reality.

Baranov meets other historical personalities during the story: Putin's faithful government official Igor Sechin, chess player and opponent Garry Kasparov, ideologue Eduard Limonov, and American President Bill Clinton, who asks for news of his "friend Boris Yeltsin."

During a meeting with high school students as part of the Goncourt high school students' prize, da Empoli said, "I prepared this book as an essay. Apart from the private life of the main character, all the facts are real. I met a lot of people, I traveled a lot in Russia. It is a very faithful reconstruction of what this country has been for the past twenty years. But at the heart of power, and Russian power in particular, there are elements of paradox, a permanent contradiction, an irrationality that only literature could transcribe."

== Themes ==
Jérôme Garcin said that the book's "certain well-tempered formulas recall the French moralists and memorialists of the 17th century", in particular La Rochefoucauld.

=== Power as artistic expression ===
For Baranov, power is a form of artistic expression, like avant-garde theater. Surkov, by whom the character is inspired, is the founder of key concepts in Kremlin ideology, including sovereign democracy and "the vertical of power."

"Putin's power is built on a mythological basis," says the author, who was himself an adviser to Matteo Renzi, the former president of the Italian council of ministers (equivalent of prime minister in other countries). He clarifies: "From my point of view, the heart of power is the heart of the irrational." "My book is really imbued with a certain French literature, which has had its place at the Academy for a long time, and which dissects power, who observes it," da Empoli told the press during the presentation of the Grand Prix du roman de l'Académie française.

=== The limits of rationality ===
About the stubbornness of Berezovsky, whose intelligence he concedes, the narrator Baranov comments: "But intelligence does not protect against anything, not even stupidity". Likewise, he develops the digital strategy of the Kremlin internationally based on this idea: "There is nothing wiser than to bet on the madness of men."

== Publication ==
Da Empoli submitted his manuscript in January 2021. The novel should have been published the same year, but the COVID-19 pandemic delayed its publication. It was finally published in April 2022, less than two months after the start of the Russian-Ukrainian war. "As soon as it was published, we sold it in the literature section and also on the table devoted to current events", said a bookseller.

The Wizard of the Kremlin depicts relations between Russia and Ukraine since the Orange Revolution and provides several keys to explaining the conflict. For Alexandra Schwartzbrod of Libération, it is "a story of great literary and historical force that must be read if you want to understand what, from here, seems incomprehensible". For Yannick Vely of Paris Match, the book "allows us to understand the causes of the Ukrainian conflict." Da Empoli is regularly invited on television and radio to present his novel in the context of current affairs of the conflict. In this regard, he says, "I would have a harder time identifying with that type of character today. I was able to get inside a Russian's head at a time when the atrocious conclusions of the Putin regime were not yet fully visible and unfolding. I don't know if I would have been able, or wanted, to write this book after the war in Ukraine...".

The book nevertheless goes beyond the topicality of its publication, as Macha Séry points out in Le Monde: "This novel undoubtedly sheds a penetrating light on the current geopolitical situation. But it will continue to be relevant after the situation has changed due to its unrelenting lucidity and sparkling style."

== Critical reception ==
In Le Masque et la Plume on France Inter, Patricia Martin evokes "an absolutely extraordinary novel, very romantic. We have the impression that we are sitting on a sofa next to Putin, that we are in Putin's head through Vadim whose confession we read," while Frédéric Beigbeder says, "It's the best first novel I've read since Les Bienveillantes by Jonathan Littell."

Writing for Les Echos, Paul Vacca sees "a frozen and burning novel at the same time. […] Driven by burning topicality, this modern and visionary book also has the timeless grace of a classic. Giuliano da Empoli's erudition, style and storytelling bring this raw and brutal gesture to a level of metaphysical purity."

For Marc Lambron, the book is a "novel of subtle and boring penetration", while Guillaume Goubert of La Croix calls it "captivating" and that it is imbued with "a disturbing veracity". "We don't let go of this book", confirms Aurélie Marcireau of Lire.

Garcin is full of praise for da Empoli and his novel: "Some will say that this writer is a visionary, others that he knows his subject better than anyone. The two qualities are not incompatible. Add a third, style, and there you have a great book."

According to Antoine Nicolle, researcher in Russian studies, in a column in Le Monde, the novel halfway between fiction and political analysis conveys an exoticized and stereotyped vision of the "real Russia", and "that only a well-informed reader will be able to even distinguish between facts and fictional inventions." According to The Guardian, "the novel serves as a bracing refresher course on the key events of recent Russian history".

== Literary prizes ==
The Wizard of the Kremlin received the Grand prix du roman de l'Académie française, with 9 votes to 5 for Ceux qui restent by Jean Michelin and 3 votes for La petite menteuse by Pascale Robert-Diard. It is also the winner of the 2022 Prix Honoré de Balzac.

Giuliano da Empoli's novel narrowly failed to obtain the Prix Goncourt, which was awarded to Vivre vite by Brigitte Giraud, in the fourteenth round and by 5 votes to 5, with Goncourt President Didier Decoin casting the final decision. This result caused some disappointments, with Paris Match issuing an article arguing why the novel would have "made a formidable Goncourt prize." Tahar Ben Jelloun, a member of the Goncourt jury who voted for the book, said of the winner: "It's a small book, there is no writing."

== Film adaptation ==
At the 82nd Venice International Film Festival, the film adaptation premiered in the competition section, directed by Olivier Assayas. The role of Baranov is played by Paul Dano while his wife is played by Alicia Vikander and Putin by Jude Law. It released theatrically in January 2026.

== See also ==
- The Wizard of the Kremlin (film)
