= Sever Pipeline =

Oil product pipeline in Russia

Sever pipeline

Location
- Country: Russia
- Direction: south-north-west
- Start: Kstovo
- Passes through: Yaroslavl, Kirishi
- To: Primorsk
- Runs alongside: Baltic Pipeline System

General information
- Type: Oil products
- Operator: Transnefteproduct
- Commissioned: 2008

Technical information
- Length: 1,056 km (656 mi)
- Maximum discharge: 24.6 million tons per year

Sever pipeline (also known as Kstovo–Yaroslavl–Kirishi–Primorsk pipeline and Sever project) is an oil product pipeline in North-West Russia. It transports diesel fuel EN-590. The pipeline is owned and operated by Transnefteproduct, a subsidiary of Transneft.

== History ==
The project was approved by Decree of the Russian Federation Government No. 853-p of 24 June 2002. It was officially opened on 14 May 2008 by Russia's Prime minister Vladimir Putin.

== Route ==
The 1,056 kilometres (656 mi) long pipeline runs from Kstovo through Yaroslavl and Kirishi to Primorsk, Leningrad Oblast. It uses the same technical corridor with the Yaroslavl-Kirishi and Kirishi-Primorsk oil pipelines of the Baltic Pipeline System.

The pipeline is supplied from several refineries, including the Yaroslavl refinery, operated by TNK-BP and Gazpromneft, and from Kirishi refinery, operated by Kinef. It is connected with the Surgut-Yaroslavl-Polotsk pipeline.

== Technical features ==
The diameter of the pipeline is 530 millimetres (21 in). The planned capacity of the pipeline and the terminal is 24.6 million tons per year. At the first stage, the capacity is 17 million tons. The pipeline includes main pumping stations in Yaroslavl and Kirishi and four other pumping stations. The tank farm in Yaroslavl has capacity of 40,000 cubic meters. The Primorsk terminal's tank farm consist of 12 vertical reservoirs with total capacity of 240,000 cubic meters (annual capacity 8.4 million tonnes) at the first stage. There are plans to double and later even triple the capacity of terminal storage. The project cost US$1.3 billion.

== See also ==
- Petroleum industry in Russia
