= Transneft pipeline =

Transneft pipeline may refer to any of the oil pipelines owned, operated, built or planned by Transneft.

- Baltic Pipeline System
- Baltic Pipeline System-II
- Druzhba pipeline
- Eastern Siberia–Pacific Ocean oil pipeline
- Baku–Novorossiysk pipeline
- Sever Pipeline
