= L'Heure des prédateurs =

2025 book by Giuliano da Empoli

L'Heure des prédateurs (published in English as The Hour of the Predator) is a 2025 book by Italian-Swiss writer Giuliano da Empoli.

== Critical reception ==
Karlin Lillington of The Irish Times wrote that the book "may be little, but it is fierce," praising it for being "fresh, personal, and as bracing as it is bleak." Kirkus Reviews described the book as "sharply observed." Marcus Colla of the Lowy Institute praised "da Empoli’s unique capacity to adopt the posture of both insider and outsider, participant and observer," saying that his "distinctive style permits him to capture this reality better than most."

Edward Lucas of The Times wrote that the book "may stray into hyperbole, but it is grounded in real life," while warning that "the breathlessly apocalyptic tone of the book, crammed into a slender 160 pages of text, will leave some readers unconvinced." James Ball of The Spectator reviewed the book as "brief, bracing and profoundly alarming," saying that it is "impressionistic and urgent. It is not evidencing, let alone proving, its thesis; it exists to provoke thought. The result is something like The Prince for our times."
