= Brigitte Giraud =

French writer

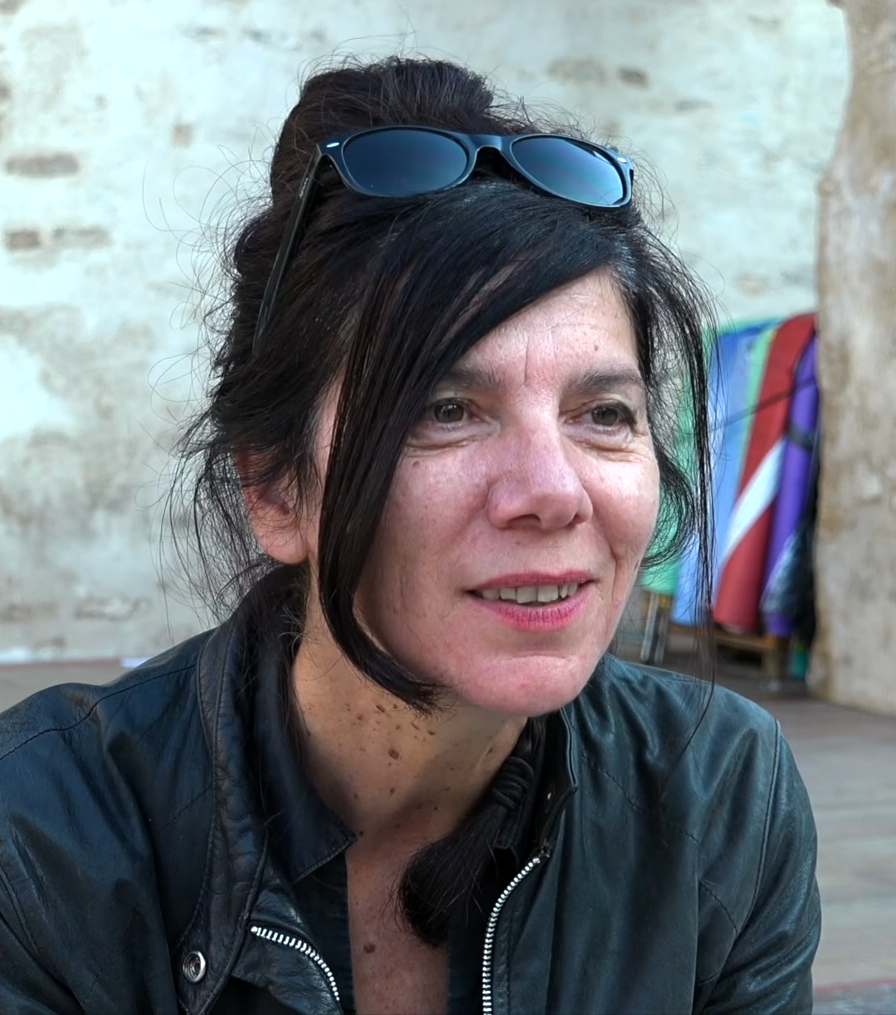
- Giraud in 2017
- Born: 1960 (age 65–66); Sidi-Bel-Abbès, French Algeria
- Occupation: Writer
- Writing career
- Language: French
- Years active: 1997–present
- Notable awards: Prix Goncourt (2022)

Brigitte Giraud (French pronunciation: [bʁiʒit ʒiʁo]; born 1960, Sidi-Bel-Abbès in Algeria) is a French writer, author of novels and short stories. She was awarded the 2022 Prix Goncourt for her autobiographical novel Vivre vite (English: Live Fast).

== Early life ==
Born in 1960, Brigitte Giraud grew up in Rillieux-la-Pape, France, before settling in nearby Lyon. She has studied English, German and Arabic.

== Career ==
Giraud has worked as a bookseller, translator and journalist. For her first book, La chambre des parents (1997), she received the Prix Littéraire des Étudiants and for Nico, her second novel, the Prix Lettres frontière Rhône-Alpes. In 2001, she received a special mention for the Wepler Prize for À présent. She won the Goncourt short story prize in 2007 for her collection L'amour est très surestimé (English: Love Is Very Overrated), then the Grand Prix Jean Giono for Une année étrangère (English: A Year Abroad) in 2009.

On 3 November 2022, she was awarded the 2022 Prix Goncourt for Vivre vite, a récit about the death of her husband, Claude, in a motorbike crash in 1999 at the age of 41. She is the thirteenth woman to receive the Goncourt since the prize's establishment in 1903. Giraud won after the jury underwent fourteen rounds of voting, the maximum amount permitted. The final vote ended in a stalemate and, in accordance with the rules, the president of the Goncourt Academy cast a deciding vote, selecting Giraud's novel over Giuliano da Empoli's The Wizard of the Kremlin (Le mage du Kremlin).

== Personal life ==
Giraud lives in Lyon. Her husband, Claude, died in a motorbike accident in 1999.

== Works ==
=== Novels and narratives (récits) ===
- 1997: La chambre des parents, Fayard
- 1999: Nico, Stock
- 2001: À présent, Stock
- 2004: Marée noire, Stock
- 2005: J'apprends, Stock
- 2009: Une année étrangère, Stock
- 2011: Pas d'inquiétude, Stock
- 2013: Avoir un corps, Stock
- 2015: Nous serons des héros, Stock
- 2017: Un loup pour l'homme, Flammarion
- 2019: Jour de courage, Flammarion
- 2022: Vivre vite, Flammarion (winner of the Prix Goncourt)
- 2022: Porté disparu, l'École des loisirs

=== Short stories ===
==== Collections ====
- 2007: L'amour est très surestimé, Stock ISBN 9782234059252 -Goncourt de la nouvelle 2007 - Bourse Goncourt de la Nouvelle.
- 2010: Avec les garçons, followed by Le Garçon, J'ai lu, ISBN 9782290027325

==== Participation ====
- 2004: "Bowling" in Tout sera comme avant, collectif, Verticales, ISBN 2-84335-198-7 - after eponymous album by Dominique A
- 2004: One short story in Dix ans sous la Bleue, collective, Stock

== Adaptations ==
- 2011: Pas d'inquietude, TV movie directed by Thierry Binisti and starring Isabelle Carré

== Awards and honours ==
- 1997 – Prix Littéraire des Étudiants for La Chambre des parents
- 2000 – Prix Lettres frontière Rhône-Alpes for Nico
- 2007 – Prix Goncourt de la nouvelle for L'amour est très surestimé
- 2009 – Prix du jury Jean-Giono for Une année étrangère
- 2014 – Officier of the Ordre des Arts et des Lettres
- 2022 – Prix Goncourt for Vivre vite

=== Nominations ===
- 2001 – Prix Femina (Selection) for À présent
- 2001 – Prix du Livre Inter (Selection) for À présent
- 2004 – Prix du Livre Inter (Selection) for Marée noire
- 2009 – Prix Fémina (finalist) for Une année étrangère
- 2011 – Prix Medicis (finalist) for Pas d'inquiétude
- 2013 – Prix Femina (Selection) for Avoir un corps
- 2015 – Prix Fémina (finalist) for Nous serons des héros
- 2017 – Prix Goncourt des lycéens (finalist) for Un loup pour l'homme
- 2017 – Prix Goncourt (Selection) for Un loup pour l'homme
- 2017 – Prix Femina (Selection) for Un loup pour l'homme
- 2017 – Prix Médicis (Selection) for Un loup pour l'homme
- 2017 – Prix du style (Selection) for Un loup pour l'homme
- 2017 – Prix des Deux Magots (Selection) for Un loup pour l'homme
