= Transneft =

Russian oil and gas company

Transneft JSC

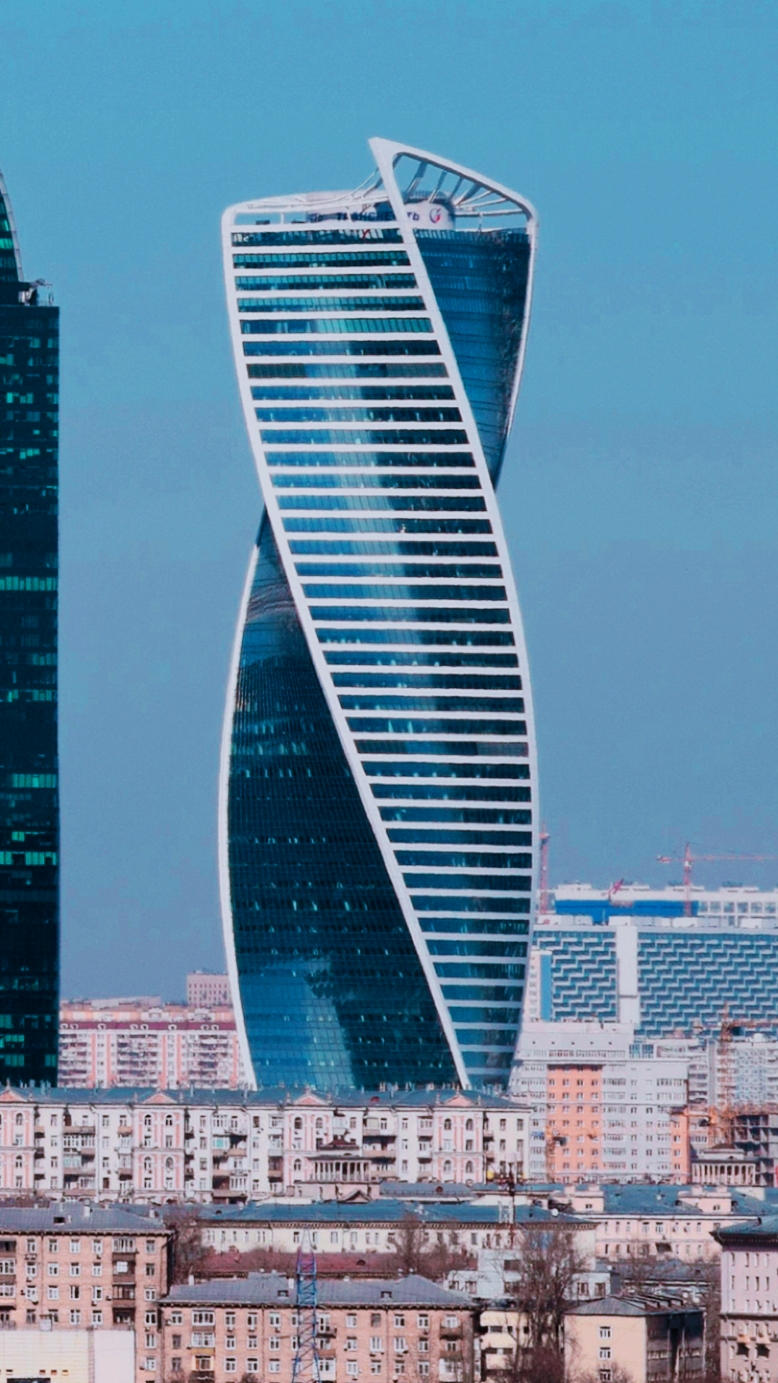
- Transneft's headquarters, the Evolution Tower in Moscow-City
- Native name: Транснефть
- Type: Public (OAO)
- Traded as: MCX: TRNFP
- Industry: transport industry
- Predecessor: Ministry of Oil Industry of the Soviet Union
- Founded: 14 August 1993; 33 years ago
- Headquarters: Moscow, Russia
- Key people: Alexander Novak (chair of the board); Nikolay Tokarev (CEO)
- Services: Pipeline oil transport
- Revenue: 1,440,281,000,000 Russian ruble (2025)
- Operating income: 249,681,000,000 Russian ruble (2025)
- Net income: 226,073,000,000 Russian ruble (2025)
- Total assets: 3,702,383,000,000 Russian ruble (2025)
- Owner: Rosimushchestvo (78.6%)
- Number of employees: 122,800 (2023)
- Subsidiaries: Transnefteproduct; Caspian Pipeline Consortium (31%)
- Website: www.transneft.ru

Transneft (Russian: Транснефть) is a state-controlled oil pipeline company headquartered in Moscow, Russia. It is the world's largest oil pipeline company. As of 2020, it operated over 70,000 kilometres (43,000 mi) of trunk pipelines and transported about 80% of oil and 30% of oil products produced in Russia.

== History ==
The Government of the Russian Federation established Transneft on 14 August 1993, and the Moscow Registration Chamber registered it on 26 August 1993.

Semyon Vainshtok headed Transneft from 13 September 1999 to 11 September 2007. (Note: Through Semyon Vainshtok's Israeli based real estate company Israel Financial Levers Ltd., Vainshtok, who is a very close associate of Vladimir Putin, owns a 35% stake in the Lipstick Building in 2011. Bernie Madoff's brokerage firm's offices were on the 19th floor of the Lipstick Building.) (Note: For Semyon Vainshtok (Russian: Семен Михайлович Вайншток born 5 October, 1947, Climăuți, Dondușeni District, Moldavian SSR), Weinstock is another spelling of his surname. Through his shell companies in Bahamas, Cyprus, and Switzerland, he has investments with Aker Solutions, the largest Norwegian oil company, which was formerly known as Aker Kværner. In the late 1990s, Vainshtok ensured the funding of Baltic Pipeline System OJSC for the building of BTS-1 and in October 1999, he appointed Alexei Miller the general director of Baltic Pipeline System. In November 2007, he was closely associated with the Dutch oil firm Vitol through its joint venture Petrovit. Of the global oil traders in 2006, Glencore led with $116.5 billion, then Vitol had $113.9 billion and third was Gunvor with $30 billion. In Russia in 2008, he and Yuri Lisin (Russian: Юрий Лисин), the former president and first vice president of Transneft respectively, along with Vainshtok's son in law Boris Lokshin (Russian: Борис Локшин), were accused by Alexei Navalny of stealing $2 billion via money laundering from Transneft through 15 billion rubles in contributions to charities from 2005–2008 and a 31.6 billion rubles scheme for the construction of the Eastern Siberia–Pacific Ocean (ESPO) oil pipeline with VNIIST OJSC (Russian: ОАО «ВНИИСТ»), Giprotruboprovod OJSC (Russian: ОАО «Гипротрубопровод»), and Krasnodarstroytransgaz (Russian: «Краснодарстройтрансгаз») which is a shell company that received from Transneft 30 billion rubles of equipment and materials through SDM-Leasing LLC (Russian: ООО «СДМ-Лизинг») with an additional advance of 7 billion rubles. Although Vainshtok had direct access to Putin and was well liked by Putin, Gennady Timchenko of Gunvor did not like Transneft and Vainshtok and went to Igor Sechin of Rosneft who allowed the new president of Transneft Nikolai Tokarev to audit Transneft in late 2007 and found discrepancies involving Vainshtok during the construction of ESPO pipeline. On April 17, 2008, he stepped down from Olimpstroy (Russian: Олимпстрой) which was the Russian state owned corporation that was developing the resort at Sochi for the 2014 Winter Olympics that Vainshtok had headed from September 11, 2007, and moved to London, where he resided until 2010, when he moved to Israel.)

In 2008, Transnefteproduct, a company transporting refined oil products, was merged into Transneft.

In 2018, Transneft took over 31% of shares which belonged to the Russian Federation in Caspian Pipeline Consortium. In 2021, the company's revenue amounted to 998 billion rubles.

=== Sanctions ===
Sanctioned by the United Kingdom from 12 September 2014 in relation to Russia's activities in Crimea.

On 24 February 2022, in response to Russia's military operations in Ukraine, several countries moved to impose more economic sanctions in addition to those in response to the 2021–2022 Russo-Ukrainian crisis. US President Joe Biden announced sanctions against several Russian individuals, companies, and financial institutions, including Transneft. In March 2022, as a result of the 2022 Russian invasion of Ukraine the EU imposed sanctions on Transneft.

== Controversies ==
Documents submitted by Transneft to the Russian Audit Chamber in 2008 were found at the disposal of Alexei Navalny, a minority shareholder of Transneft. The papers, published on 16 November 2010, contain information regarding multiple economic crimes committed by Transeft employees, including Semyon Vainshtok, its daughter structures, and contractors in the construction of the Eastern Siberia–Pacific Ocean oil pipeline. The documents describe how Transneft executives set up a series of shell companies to pose as contractors for Transneft's pipeline project. Navalny posted an audit indicating that the contracting fraud had cost Transneft US$4 billion. Both Transneft and the government auditing office, whose documents Navalny said he leaked on his site, denied the corruption claim. Prime Minister Vladimir Putin called for an investigation into the allegations. The company's management confirmed all facts related to theft and fraud. The officials endorsed the reports that recorded the breaches.

Transneft has been repeatedly criticized for the lack of transparency regarding its expenditures on charity. From 2007 to 2011, the company did not disclose information on recipients of these funds. In 2011, Transneft officially published information about its charity expenditures. It turned out that from January 2011, the company spent 3.21 billion rubles on charity. However, only 52 million rubles were used to support several charity institutions, and 2.55 billion rubles were transferred to the Konstantinovsky charity foundation (its chair was Vladimir Kozhin, a former head of the Directorate of the President of the Russian Federation).

== See also ==
- Energy policy of Russia
- 2007 Russia–Belarus energy dispute
- Petroleum industry in Russia
