= Baltic Pipeline System =

Russian oil transport system

Coordinates: 60.3353°N 28.7150°E

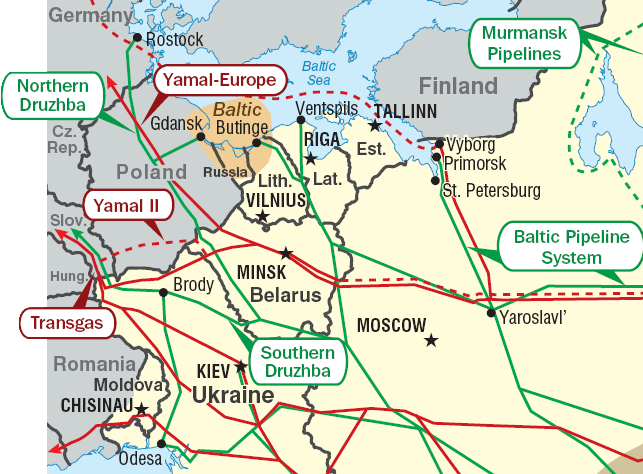
- Location of Baltic Pipeline System

Location
- Country: Russia
- Direction: south-north-west
- Start: Yaroslavl
- Passes through: Kirishi
- To: Primorsk
- Runs alongside: Sever Pipeline

General information
- Type: Oil
- Operator: Transneft
- Commissioned: 2001

Technical information
- Maximum discharge: 76.5 million tons per year

The Baltic Pipeline System (BPS) is a Russian oil transport system operated by the oil pipeline company Transneft. The BPS transports oil from the Timan-Pechora region, West Siberia and Urals-Volga regions to Primorsk oil terminal at the eastern part of the Gulf of Finland.

== History ==
The project started in 1997 and construction was completed in December 2001. In April 2006 the Baltic Pipeline System reached full design capacity.

== Technical features ==
Main elements of the BPS-1 are:

- Yaroslavl-Kirishi pipeline
- Kirishi pumping station
- Kirishi-Primorsk pipeline
- Oil terminal in Primorsk.

The capacity of the BPS-1 is 76.5 million tons of oil per year.

== Controversy ==
During planning and construction stages, the project was criticized by environmentalists, mainly because of the Baltic Sea's status as a particularly sensitive sea area and Primorsk’s proximity to the Beryozovye Islands nature reserve, a major bird sanctuary protected by the Ramsar Convention.

== BPS-2 ==
The Baltic Pipeline System-2 (BPS-2) is a second trunk line of the system running from the Unecha junction of the Druzhba pipeline near the Russia-Belarus border to the Ust-Luga terminal on the Gulf of Finland with a 172 kilometres (107 mi) long branch line to the Kirishi oil refinery. The construction of the BPS-2 started on 10 June 2009 and it entered in function in late March 2012.

== See also ==
- Druzhba pipeline
- Caspian Pipeline Consortium
- Sever Pipeline
- Petroleum industry in Russia
