= Giuliano da Empoli =

Italian and Swiss political essayist and novelist (born 1973)

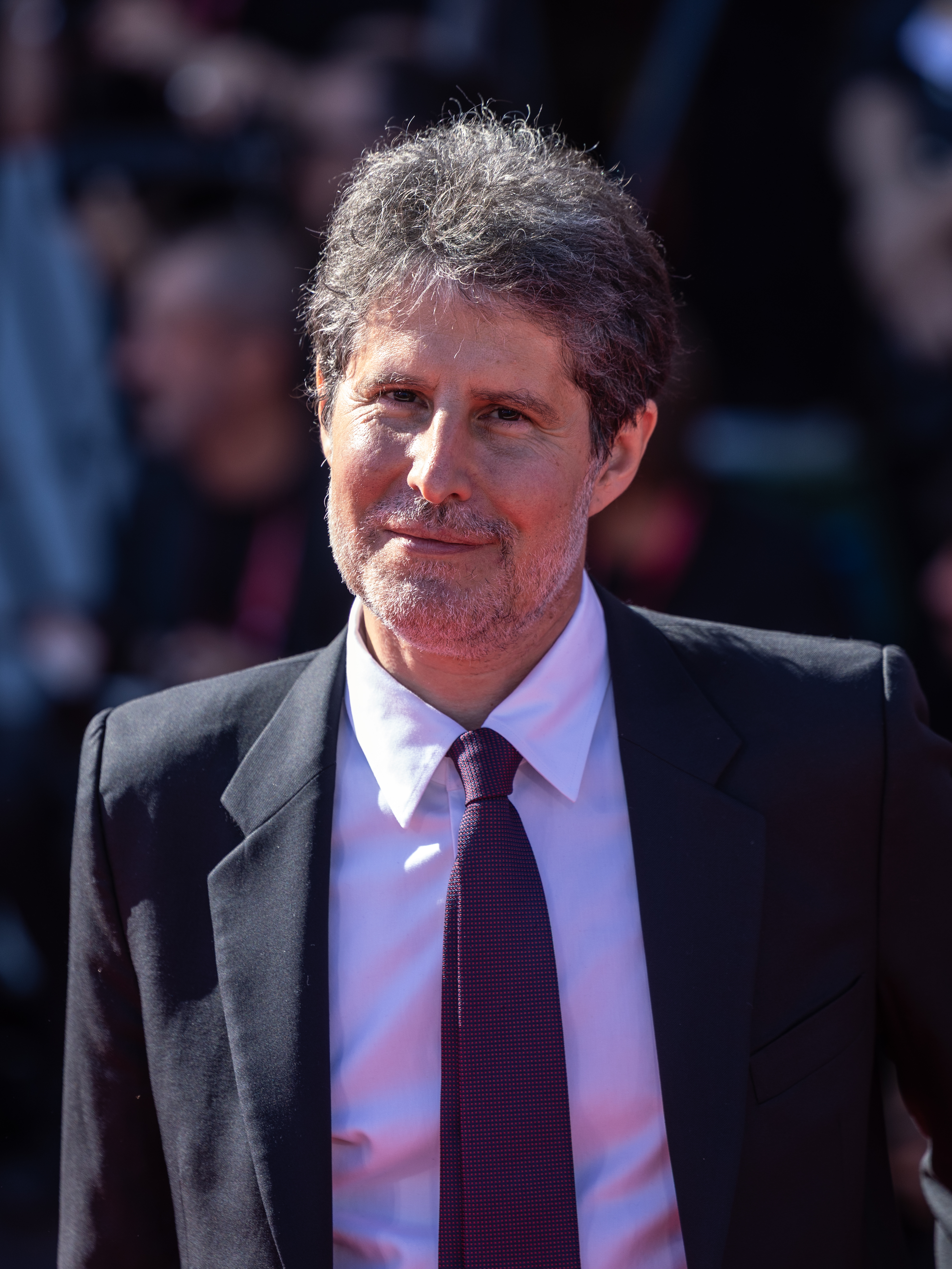
- Empoli at the 2025 Venice Film Festival
- Born: 27 August 1973 (age 53); Neuilly-sur-Seine, France
- Education: Sapienza University of Rome; Sciences Po
- Occupations: Political essayist; novelist
- Writing career
- Language: French; Italian
- Years active: 1996–present
- Notable works: Les ingénieurs du chaos (2019); Le mage du Kremlin (2022); L'Heure des prédateurs (2025)

Giuliano da Empoli (born 27 August 1973) is an Italian and Swiss political essayist and novelist. He is the founding chairman of Volta, a Milan-based think tank self-described as "an accelerator of ideas" with a focus on European affairs, and a professor at Sciences Po. In 2022, he published his debut novel in French Le mage du Kremlin (The Wizard of the Kremlin), for which he received the Grand Prix du roman de l'Académie française.

== Life and career ==
Born in 1973 in Neuilly-sur-Seine, a wealthy suburb of Paris, Giuliano da Empoli grew up in several European countries, graduated in law at Sapienza University of Rome and obtained a master's degree in political science at the Institut d'études politiques de Paris (Sciences Po).

He has been Deputy Mayor for culture in Florence and a senior advisor to Italian Prime Minister Matteo Renzi.

He has also been an executive board member at the Venice Biennale and the chairman of the Gabinetto Vieusseux in Florence.

From 2006 to 2008, he served as Senior Advisor to Italy's Vice-Prime Minister and Minister of Culture, Francesco Rutelli, establishing the first Italian Design Council in Milan.

In 2016, he founded the think tank Volta, a member of the Global Progress network.

He has been a guest speaker at numerous conferences around the world (including São Paulo's ESPM, Geneva's Finance Foundation, Paris' Foundation Ricard and Zürich's Club Baur au Lac) and is a member of The Travellers Club in Paris.

=== Writer and political essayist ===
Since 1996, he has been a regular contributor and columnist for the country's leading printed media, including Il Corriere della Sera, La Repubblica, Il Sole 24 Ore and Il Riformista.

He also hosted a weekly talk radio show on Italy's main financial news radio, Radio 24. As an author and social commentator, he has been regularly appearing on all of the main Italian TV channels.

At the age of twenty-two he published his first book "Un grande futuro dietro di noi" about the problems faced by the Italian youth, which sprung a national debate and led the newspaper La Stampa to designate him "Man of the year".

In 2022, he published his debut novel Le mage du Kremlin (The Wizard of the Kremlin), whose main character is modelled on Vladimir Putin's advisor Vladislav Surkov. The novel was awarded the 2022 Grand Prix du roman de l'Académie française. The novel was a finalist for the 2022 Prix Goncourt. The novel lost to Brigitte Giraud's Vivre vite after fourteen rounds of voting ended in a stalemate, leading the president of the Goncourt Academy to cast the deciding vote, choosing Giraud over Giuliano da Empoli.

== Books ==
- Un grande futuro dietro di noi (Marsilio, 1996) ISBN 88-317-6488-8
- La guerra del talento (2000) about meritocracy and mobility in the digital economy ISBN 88-317-7401-8
- Overdose (2002) about information overload ISBN 88-317-7966-4
- Fuori controllo (2004) about the "brazilification" of contemporary society (translated into French by Grasset and Brazilian Portuguese by Sulina) ISBN 88-317-8659-8
- La sindrome di Meucci (2005) about Italy's creative industries ISBN 88-317-8923-6
- Canton Express (2008), a historical travelogue (translated into Portuguese by Livraria Bertrand) ISBN 978-88-06-19212-9
- Obama, La politica nell'era di Facebook (2008) about Barack Obama's election as an example of auto-biographical politics ISBN 88-317-9608-9.
- Contro gli specialisti (Marsilio, 2013) ISBN 88-317-1516-X.
- La prova del potere (Mondadori, 2015) ISBN 88-046-5069-9.
- Le Florentin (Grasset, 2016) ISBN 2246859875.
- La rabbia e l'algoritmo (Marsilio, 2017) ISBN 978-88-317-2773-0.
- Les Ingénieurs du chaos (Lattès, 2019) ISBN 9782709664066.
- Le mage du Kremlin (Gallimard, 2022) ISBN 9782072958168.
- L'Heure des prédateurs (Gallimard, 2025) ISBN 978-2-07-311320-7.
- Le Fondateur (Gallimard, 2026) ISBN 978-2-07-317065-1.

== Honours ==
- (France) Knight of the Legion of Honour (2023)
