= Transnefteproduct =

Russian oil and gas company

- Native name: АО «Транснефтепродукт»
- Company type: Public (OAO)
- Industry: Oil and gas
- Founded: 1992
- Headquarters: Moscow, Russia
- Key people: Pavel Gorshenkov (CEO)
- Services: Pipeline transport
- Parent: Transneft
- Website: transnefteproduct.transneft.ru

Transnefteproduct (Russian: Транснефтепродукт) is an operator of oil products pipelines headquartered in Moscow, Russia. It operates more than 19,300 kilometres (12,000 mi) oil pipelines. It was established by the Government of the Russian Federation on 30 August 1993. On 16 April 2007, Transnefteproduct became a subsidiary of an oil pipelines operator Transneft.

== Activity ==
The main activity of JSC Transnefteproduct and its subsidiaries pipeline companies is the transportation of light petroleum products — diesel fuel, gasoline, kerosene from 18 refineries to various regions of Russia, the countries of the Customs Union (Republic of Belarus, Kazakhstan), as well as to non-CIS countries (Latvia, Ukraine, Hungary) through the system of main oil product pipelines (MNPP). Currently the length of the Company's oil product pipelines is 19.1 thousand km. Of these, the main oil product pipelines are 15.4 thousand km, the branches are 3.7 thousand km, including: across Russia − 16.4 thousand km.

== See also ==
- Petroleum industry in Russia
