= Sovereign democracy =

Term describing modern Russian politics

Sovereign democracy (Russian: суверенная демократия, transl. suverennaya demokratiya) is a term describing modern Russian politics first used by Vladislav Surkov on 22 February 2006 in a speech before a gathering of the Russian political party United Russia. According to Surkov, sovereign democracy is:

A society's political life where the political powers, their authorities and decisions are decided and controlled by a diverse Russian nation for the purpose of reaching material welfare, freedom and fairness by all citizens, social groups and nationalities, by the people that formed it.

This term was used thereafter by political figures such as Sergei Ivanov, Vladimir Putin, Boris Gryzlov and Vasily Yakemenko. It was the official ideology of the Russian youth movement NASHI, which was created in support of Vladimir Putin.

Sovereign Democracy in Russia was realised in the form of a dominant-party system which was put into place in 2007 when as a result of the Russian legislative election of 2007 the political party United Russia, headed by President Vladimir Putin, without forming a government, formally became the leading and guiding force in Russian society.

Concrete priorities and orientations of Sovereign Democracy were conceptualized in Prime Minister Putin's Plan.

== Criticism ==
According to The Washington Post, the term sovereign democracy conveys that "Russia's regime is democratic and, second, that this claim must be accepted without demanding any proof, period. Any attempt at verification will be regarded as unfriendly and as meddling in Russia's domestic affairs." Yuri Semyonov wrote in 2008:

The concept of sovereignty relates to government as a whole, and not to a certain form of rule or to a political regime. Democracy can be direct or representative, real (which has never actually existed in the human history), formal (as in antiquity, or the modern Western countries), or a fiction (as in the USSR and other so-called socialist countries).

Commenting on the term in an interview for Expert published in 2006, Dmitry Medvedev said that sovereignty and democracy belong in different conceptual categories and that fusing them is impossible. "If you take the word 'democracy' and start attaching qualifiers to it that would seem a little odd. It would lead one to think that we're talking about some other, non-traditional type of democracy."

On 19 July 2006, Mikhail Gorbachev commented on the abolitions of single-member constituencies as well as the raising of the threshold for participation in the Duma to 7%. He stated that "these innovations into legislation cannot be justified by theories of 'sovereign' or 'managed' democracy. Limitations that may be found to be necessary when the very existence of the government and its citizens may be threatened must be looked upon as temporary, and not elevated into principles, like is done by the theorists of 'sovereign' and 'managed' democracy. These kinds of definitions distort the essence of democracy, just like the concepts of 'socialist' and 'people's' democracy before them."

Whilst talking about sovereign democracy in 2006, Mikhail Kasyanov said that "... the aims of this doctrine are quite clear: the concentration and holding of political power and property at any cost. The consequences of this are already evident, including the glorification of populism, the steady destruction of private and public institutions and the departure from the principles of the law, democracy, and the free market."

United States Assistant Secretary of State for European and Eurasian Affairs Daniel Fried (in office 2005–2009) stated in a 2007 interview:

I get nervous when people put labels in front of democracy. Sovereign democracy, managed democracy, people's democracy, socialist democracy, Aryan democracy, Islamic democracy—I am not a big fan of adjectives. Managed democracy doesn't sound like democracy. Sovereign democracy strikes me as meaningless.

== See also ==
- Sovereigntism
- Authoritarianism
- Conservative democracy
- Guided democracy
- Illiberal democracy

== Sources ==
- Project "Russia—Sovereign democracy", analytical portal.
- "Sovereignty is a political synonym for the ability to compete", Vladislav Surkov, public speech, 7 February 2006
- "Nationalisation of the Future", Vladislav Surkov
- "Our Russian model of democracy is called 'Sovereign democracy'", Vladislav Surkov, briefing, 28 June 2006
