= Political abuse of psychiatry in Russia =

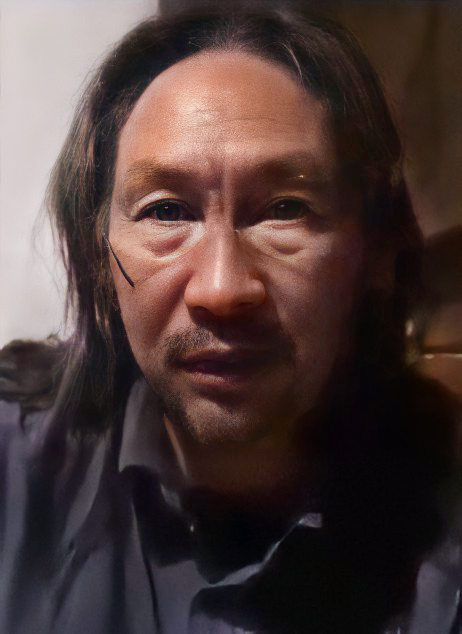
Alexander Gabyshev, a Russian Yakut dissident who was sentenced to compulsory treatment multiple times

Political abuse of psychiatry in Russia (Russian: Карательная психиатрия в Российской Федерации, romanized: Karatel'naya psikhiatriya v Rossiyskoy Federatsii) implies a misuse of psychiatric diagnosis, detention and treatment for the purposes of obstructing the fundamental human rights of certain groups and individuals in a society. In other words, abuse of psychiatry including one for political purposes is the deliberate action of getting citizens certified, who, because of their mental condition, need neither psychiatric restraint nor psychiatric treatment. Psychiatrists have been involved in human rights abuses in states across the world when the definitions of mental disease were expanded to include political disobedience. As scholars have long argued, governmental and medical institutions code menaces to authority as mental diseases during political disturbances. Nowadays, in many countries, political prisoners are sometimes confined and abused in mental institutions. Psychiatric confinement of sane people is uniformly considered a particularly pernicious form of repression.

In the period from the 1960s up to 1986, abuse of psychiatry for political purposes was reported to be occasional in Eastern Bloc countries such as Romania, Hungary, Czechoslovakia, and Yugoslavia. It was reported as systematic in the Soviet Union.

== Background ==
Robert van Voren of the Global Initiative on Psychiatry says the emergence of individual cases of political abuse of psychiatry in Russia is directly related to the deterioration of the human rights situation and to the fact that on-the-spot authorities feel more carefree than they did before, and deal with undesirable elements at their own discretion. The aura of inviolability is returned to the Russian rulers, and the rule of law becomes subject to political machinations. Everything points to the fact that Russia still has the structure to exercise political abuse of psychiatry. Both political and economic nomenklatura is quite powerful and would not stop short of using illegal means, especially now when the political nomenklatura has absorbed economic power from Russian oligarchs, and the country is, in fact, ruled by the circle of people who came directly from the KGB whose capacities to establish control are limitless. According to Eduard Kuznetsov, "More than 50 percent of the key state positions are occupied by former KGB officials. The same occasionally happens in many countries monitored by the Global Initiative on Psychiatry. Psychiatry is regarded as a handy tool to solve disputes, and one can easily buy a diagnosis from a psychiatrist. In most of the countries, forensic psychiatry has changed only slightly. The strong resistance to introducing the modern practices of forensic psychiatry is not due to disparities in schools or views, but the fact that the reform of the system would mean the end of corruption. Criminals pay off their imprisonment of many years by having themselves declared insane. Wealthy husbands declare about the mental illnesses in their wives to get rid of them and yet keep control over their children. Children declare their parents and grandparents legally incapable to sell their apartments. Even medical institutions recognize their patients as insane to take their property. Today, the Russian opposition cannot expect the type of help the West gave in Soviet times. Supporting Soviet dissidents was part of anti-Soviet policy, but now pragmatism and precise calculation rules.

According to psychiatrist Sofia Dorinskaya, the situation always develops in the same way — either in the evening or at night, or in the early morning, when a person sleeps, the police break the door down in his apartment or room, handcuff and escort him directly or through a police office to a mental hospital, where the door is closed behind the person. When the door is closed, and you sit face to face with a psychiatrist, then all written by the psychiatrist will be a proof of your madness for a judge in court. Even if you just sit on a chair, say nothing, or speak reasonably, the psychiatrist can write that you threw yourself against walls and that you tried to scratch his eyes out and so on and so forth.

Discrediting the citizens by instituting far-fetched proceedings to obtain a ground for examination is a favorite tactic of officials whose interests are hurt by the active members of public. The police deliver "the ill" to a psychiatric facility, and the doctor can be sure that his facility will not be reduced, and, in general, the more "patients", the more funding. Even if the criminal case is closed due to its complete failure, it does not regard the dispensary, the person is all the same "ill". According to Doctor of Legal Sciences Vladimir Ovchinsky, regional differences in forensic psychiatric expert reports are striking. For example, in some regions of Russia, 8 or 9 percent of all examinees are pronounced sane; in other regions up to 75 percent of all examinees are pronounced sane. In some regions less than 2 percent of examinees are declared schizophrenics; in other regions up to 80 percent of examinees are declared schizophrenics. According to Vitaly Portnikov, 86 percent of Russians support the policy of their president, who renewed punitive psychiatry, and approve of declaring the healthy people the mentally ill.

== Mass trials ==
From 1994, the nationalization of expert activity started, and people witnessed the same technologies as those practiced on political dissidents. The same gimmicks were applied to religious dissenters to a not lesser extent. In the Serbsky Center, the special group for "study of the negative influence of religious groups" under the leadership of professor Fyodor Kondratyev was created. Kondratyev's group started supervising numerous trials initiated all over the country. It came to legal actions practically for sorcery. The Nezavisimiy Psikhiatricheskiy Zhurnal documented the history of numerous religious trials, demonstrated the total groundlessness of the charges of "gross harm on mental health", and evolved their political and ideological background. The Independent Psychiatric Association of Russia repeatedly caught Fyodor Kondratyev, the author of pseudoscientific theory of sectomania, in his falsifications. His special department "for studying destructive cults," which is located in the Serbsky Center, closely collaborated with Alexander Dvorkin. Known for his intolerance and radicalism, Dvorkin has nothing in common with science and ranks even followers of Nikolai Rerikh and the religious communities of Yakov Krotov and Grigori Kochetkov among "totalitarian sects." In Yuri Savenko's words, "when a psychiatrist-academician (Dmitrieva, Sidorov) or an expert-psychologist of the Institute of Psychology of the Russian Academy of Sciences rely on the works by Dvorkin and Hassan, which do not belong to science, it is a symptom of degradation." In 2014, the experts of the Serbsky Center received the medical documents about the mental health condition of Alexander Dvorkin from a psychoneurological dispensary, studied them and concluded that he needed to be constantly supervised by a psychiatrist and take psychotropic drugs.

The denial by the Serbsky Center of the abuse of psychiatry for political purposes in 1960–1980s and the open rehabilitation of the main director of this infamous campaign academician Georgi Morozov are a direct evidence of the restoration of police psychiatry.

There have been examples of the serious misuse of psychiatry by local authorities reminiscent of the Soviet abuses. A number of human rights organizations including the Independent Psychiatric Association of Russia criticized the use of psychiatry in "deprogramming" members of "totalitarian sects." In such cases, authorities apply spiritual and pseudo-psychological techniques to "treat" individuals who are members of new religious groups. Six Scientologists were arbitrarily detained for psychiatric examination. In January 2000 in St. Petersburg, chief psychiatrist Larisa Rubina charged leader of Sentuar (the local offshoot of the Church of Scientology) Vladimir Tretyak with inflicting psychological damage on his coreligionists. On June 17, six members of Sentuar – Lyudmila Urzhumtseva, Svetlana Pastuchenkova, Svetlana Kruglova, Irina Shamarina, Igor Zakrayev, and Mikhail Dvorkin – were forcibly hospitalized and subjected to 3 weeks of criminal investigation at the behest of Boris Larionov, procurator of the Vyborgsky district of St. Petersburg.

In 2005, Igor Kanterov, a professor of the Moscow State University, wrote that psychiatrists and psychologists were actually being involved in a very unattractive occupation, stigmatizing "alien" religions and their followers, who were about 1 million first-class citizens of the Russian Federation, and putting them "on the basis of a list of them" in the category of "psychic terrorists." While reviewing Sidorov's article "Psychic terrorism is nonlethal weapon of mass destruction" published by the Rossiyskiy Psikhiatricheskiy Zhurnal in its issue 3 of 2005, Kanterov notes that, according to it, religious behavior is regarded as inherently deviant from the "norm", that similar type of behavior is always dependent and imposed by recruiting and manipulative influence and that, thus, the possibility to be initiated into religious organizations due to free choice of religious belief guaranteed by the Constitution of the Russian Federation is outright rejected. In his 2010 article, Kanterov writes about the works by P.I. Sidorov and V.E. Pashkovskiy and points out that inspired by the desire to expose the malicious actions of "totalitarian cults," P.I. Sidorov and V.E. Pashkovskiy at the same time never resort to Russian laws regulating activity of religious associations, and it can hardly be considered accidental, since all the original sets of the authors are in flagrant contravention of current legislation. The Federal Law of the Russian Federation "On Freedom of Conscience and on Religious Associations" contains the following types of associations of believers: religious groups, religious organizations, local and centralized religious associations, and its legislator mentions about no "sects," "cults," especially with the frightening adjectives "destructive" or "totalitarian." However, in Kanterov's words, peer-reviewed publications use the term "totalitarian sects" as a key concept that naturally generates psychiatric disorders and produces horror stories about "psychic terrorism," "non-lethal weapon of mass destruction," "usurpation of belongings and savings of followers," "recruitment," etc. P.I. Sidorov presents a list of "totalitarian cults" with the names of over twenty religious organizations, and many of them have status of registered centralized organizations that successfully passed registration and re-registration provided for by the Law "On Freedom of Conscience and Religious Associations" after the Expert Council for Religious Examination under the Ministry of Justice of the Russian Federation made for each of these organizations expert reports, in which the detailed assessment of the religious doctrine, rituals, attitude of the religious organizations to society, family, and individual were given, but no violations were found.

In 2006, Yuri Savenko stated that a first large relapse of the use of psychiatry for political purposes in post-Soviet Russia during recent decade was struggle against "totalitarian sects." According to Yuri Savenko, the reason for the use of psychiatry against religious minorities, which began from 1995, was Y.I. Polishchuk's report containing conclusion about "gross harm on mental health" inflicted by various religious organizations. This report was distributed to all public prosecutors' offices of the country and to the presidents of the educational institutions despite the fact that its scientific inadequacy was emphasized by not only the Independent Psychiatric Association of Russia (the IPA), but also the Russian Society of Psychiatrists since all imputed cases of illness, suicide, family breakdown, etc. proved to be much more frequent in the general population than in the persecuted religious organizations. As the result of a series of court trials, it is only the vocabulary of the accusations that changed and became less clumsy; "destructive cults" started to be used instead of "totalitarian sects"; "unlawful use of hypnosis", then "inconspicuous use of suggestion", and, finally, "action at a subconscious level" through lectures and printed production with even anti-drug abuse contents started to be used instead of "gross harm on mental health".

In 1999, the IPA expressed its concern about the facts of the use of psychiatry against religious minorities in the IPA Open Letter to the General Assembly of XI Congress of the WPA. When stressing all the responsibility taken by the authors of the letter for the action involved in their statement, they noted in it that they considered it necessary to draw the WPA General Assembly's attention to the recurrent use of psychiatry for non-medical purposes, which was recommenced in Russia from 1994–1995, was subsequently going on a large-scale without slackening and was aimed at suppressing not political dissenters but already religious dissenters. This letter was concluded with the proposal, which was addressed to the WPA, to adopt the text of statement containing words of the WPA's concern about initiating numerous lawsuits against various religious organizations in Russia for allegedly "inflicting by them gross harm on mental health and for unhealthy changes of personality" and to express in the statement the WPA's solidarity with the position of the Independent Psychiatric Association of Russia and the Russian Society of Psychiatrists as to inadmissibility of involving psychiatrists in issues straining their professional competence.

In 2003, a "wrongful confinement" lawsuit, in which Yuri Savenko took part, was filed in the European Court of Human Rights. When writing about this case, Savenko charged the Serbsky Institute with "having pernicious effect on Russian medicine" and warned that the psychiatric leadership "is now completely under the shadow of the state."

Savenko's organization cooperated with a number of other NGOs to compose a highly critical report about rising rates of mental disease and the deteriorating system of mental health care. In the report, authors blamed "chronic underfunding of psychiatric care, corruption, and poverty" and pointed an accusing finger at the psychiatric leadership.

Legal proceedings took place against the organization "F.A.K.E.L.-P.O.R.T.O.S.", a youth commune of the similar type as that of Anton Makarenko. The organization was engaged in self-improvement of its members and re-education of street children and created successful farms under Kharkov and Moscow. In 2000, the commune was smashed up by Luberetskiy RUBOP, with gross violations of law, the members of the organization was wrongly accused of creating "an illegal paramilitary group." In particular, Yuriy Davydov was sentenced to imprisonment and compulsory treatment with a diagnosis of "schizophrenia, delusional ideas of perestroika and reformation of society" made by the Serbsky Center. Evgeni Privalov was declared insane with the diagnosis of "schizophrenia". The defense insisted that Davydov and Privalov had to be acquitted "as mentally healthy people". Yulia Privedyonnaya was eventually recognized as mentally healthy by forensic psychiatric expert examination. The case of Privedyonnaya lasted for a long time. In human rights activists' opinion, her inpatient forensic psychiatric expert examination was a means to intimidate her and psych her out. They saw Privedyonnaya's plight as yet another worrying sign that Russia's authorities were ready to renew Soviet-style psychiatric treatment of dissenters.

== Individual cases ==
=== Ivan Ivannikov ===
In December 2003, Ivan Ivannikov, who lectured at the Saint Petersburg State University of Economics and Finance for 38 years, was committed to the city psychiatric hospital after a long dispute with a contractor over repairs to his apartment. The recommendation for commitment was signed by an influential state psychiatrist, who had not met Ivannikov before it was decided that his multiple legal complaints against the contractor were an "obsession" with "revenge." He was discharged after 60 days.

=== Rafael Usmanov ===
Rafael Usmanov was involved in a failed bid for the governorship of Magadan Oblast. Tsvetkov who won the election brought an action against Usmanov, accusing him of libel. The case lasted for a long time. Law enforcement agencies, aware of the inefficacy of their collected body of evidence (the human rights activist used the documented facts in his agitational campaign), resorted to his sending to a mental hospital. Usmanov passed psychiatric examination five times, with each examination finding him sane and capable. Therefore, he saw nothing special in his being called to appear in a psycho-neurological dispensary. But this time, to his surprise, he was sent to a psychiatric unit from the head doctor's office and hospitalized. The psychiatric examination declared him to be insane. The documents told a murky story that Usmanov found a gas-powered pistol, which he then modified, and used to shoot at the head of the unit of the Magadan psychiatric hospital and injured him in the leg. However, the body of evidence for the accusation was based on the hospital personnel's testimonies alone. The indictment lacked any references to statements of dactyloscopic and other examinations. According to the 2004 report by the International Helsinki Federation for Human Rights, he shot at the head doctor with the hope that a criminal action will be brought against him and that he will be tried for the assassination attempt on the life of the head doctor; it was the last straw he tried to grasp at to escape from the hands of psychiatrists. The plan failed. Usmanov spent nine years in the hospital, from 2003 to 2012.

=== Igor Molyakov ===
In 2004, Igor Molyakov was imprisoned on libel charges for six months. While imprisoned, he was ordered committed for hospitalization to a psychiatric hospital after government lawyers persuaded a judge that Molyakov expressed in his writings about corruption among local authorities a view so "somber" that it might be regarded as a "mental disorder."

=== Albert Imendayev ===
In the fall of 2005, Albert Imendayev was committed to a psychiatric hospital when he collected the signatures to run for the legislature in Cheboksary. Nine days later he was discharged and was out of the race, because by that time the election filing deadline had passed. Imendayev's act of insanity was filing a number of legal complaints against local officials, judges, prosecutors, and police, alleging violation of court procedures, corruption, and cronyism—charges that are typical of modern Russia. The prosecutor, who was a frequent target of Imendayev's criticisms, qualified his behavior as "paranoia."

=== Roman Lukin ===
In 2005, Roman Lukin, a businessman of Cheboksary, held up a sign on a public square calling three judges "creeps" and after that was committed for "unexplainable behavior". He felt he had not received justice from the courts after seeking a compensation for a bad debt that ruined him. Lukin spent two weeks in the local psychiatric hospital, which recommended that he be subjected to further evaluation for possible "paranoid personality disorder" at a specialized hospital in Moscow. The doctors of the Independent Psychiatric Association who examined Lukin found him mentally healthy.

=== Nikolai Skachkov ===
In 2005, Nikolai Skachkov, who protested police brutality and official corruption in the Omsk region of Siberia, spent six months in a closed psychiatric facility, with a diagnosis of paranoia. The association, which carried out a separate examination earlier this year, found him healthy.

=== Marina Trutko ===
In March 2006, a former nuclear scientist and vocal public defender Marina Trutko was subjected to daily injections for six weeks at Psychiatric Hospital No. 14 in Dubna, Russia, to treat her for a "paranoid personality disorder."

=== Svyatoslav Barykin ===
In 2006, a forester of the Muromtsevsky District Svyatoslav Barykin wrote to the District Department of the Interior, the prosecutor and the district head to inform them about constantly plundering timberland in the forest where he worked and lived. In the early morning, two officers of the District Department of the Interior and a nurse knocked on the door of Barykin's house. The group brought the decision to forcibly hospitalize the forester signed by Stepanov, a psychiatrist of the region hospital. He recognized paranoia, schizophrenia and severe syndrome of litigiousness in Barykin. Psychiatrists Antoshkin, Minaeva, Kovalchuk confirmed the diagnosis made by their colleague Stepanov and sent the "patient" to a violent patients ward. However, a fact confusing to the hospital was soon found out: a week before his forced hospitalization, the forester passed the voluntary examination in the hospital to receive a permit of the right to have a hunting weapon. And the hospital gave him a reference that he is absolutely mentally healthy. As a result, the district court of Omsk, after considering the reference on the forester's sanity, decided to let him leave the mental hospital where he spent ten days.

=== Dmitri Shchyokotov ===
Dmitri Shchyokotov, who defended the rights of ordinary inhabitants of the Muromtsevsky District in their conflicts with headmen and local authorities, was accused of slander on the head of local judicial authority and committed in a psychiatric hospital. After he spent two days in its violent unit without having food, water, and medicines, he was recognized as sane by the commission of doctors of the Omsk psychiatric hospital and discharged. However, he lost his eyesight because he could not use his eye drops for these two days in the psychiatric hospital.

=== Vladimir Bukovsky ===
In 2007, an official at the Serbsky Center declared that Vladimir Bukovsky, who was then going to run for the President of the Russian Federation, was undoubtedly "psychopathic". In 2012, Mikhail Vinogradov, one of the leading staff members of the Serbsky Center, said publicly that Bukovsky was "a completely crazy character."

=== Artyom Basyrov ===
In 2007, an activist of the coalition "The Other Russia" Artyom Basyrov was involuntarily placed in a psychiatric hospital on the eve of planned "demonstration of dissent", one of the organizers of which was A. Basyrov. A. Basyrov suffered from slight mental disorder, but there was no real reason for his hospitalization: Artyom was in need of outpatient therapy, not involuntary inpatient treatment. In the reasoned opinion of the medical commission sent to the court, his mental disorders were grossly exaggerated.

=== Andrei Novikov ===
There were also no reasons for the involuntary inpatient treatment of Andrei Novikov, a journalist imprisoned on charges of extremism and sent to involuntary psychiatric treatment, after he publicly criticized Vladimir Putin's policy in Chechnya. Impartial legal proceedings would not have found formal components of a crime in the charges brought against Novikov, but his old psychiatric diagnosis along with the expansive interpretation of the concept of "danger" as the reason for his involuntary hospitalization allowed to solve his case in the way most convenient for authorities.

=== Larisa Arap ===
In July 2007, the activist Larisa Arap was forcibly confined at a psychiatric clinic in Apatity soon after publishing her article about mistreatment of patients in the same hospital where she was committed.

=== Marina Kalashnikova ===
Journalist Marina Kalashnikova was also detained in a mental hospital for 35 days and claims it was done in an attempt to dissuade her from criticizing the authorities.

=== Alexey Manannikov ===
On 23 December 2010, Alexey Manannikov, one of organizers of opposition rallies in Novosibirsk, was sent for psychiatric examination to a mental hospital because of his insulting the judge of the Central Regional Court of Novosibirsk Mariya Shishkina by writing in his blog.

=== Nadezhda Nizovkina ===
In 2012, Nadezhda Nizovkina and Vera Lavreshina were detained during their protest action at the Red Square. After Nizovkina refused to write an application that she is sorry for what she had been doing at the Red Square, she was convicted to "involuntary hospitalization in psychiatric hospital for six months." Nizovkina was hospitalized in Gannushkina Psychiatric Hospital, and her hospitalization was ruled legal by Moscow's Preobrazhensky District Court. On the doctors' request, her mother assumed responsibility for her by signing documents and was permitted to take her from the hospital.

=== Pussy Riot ===
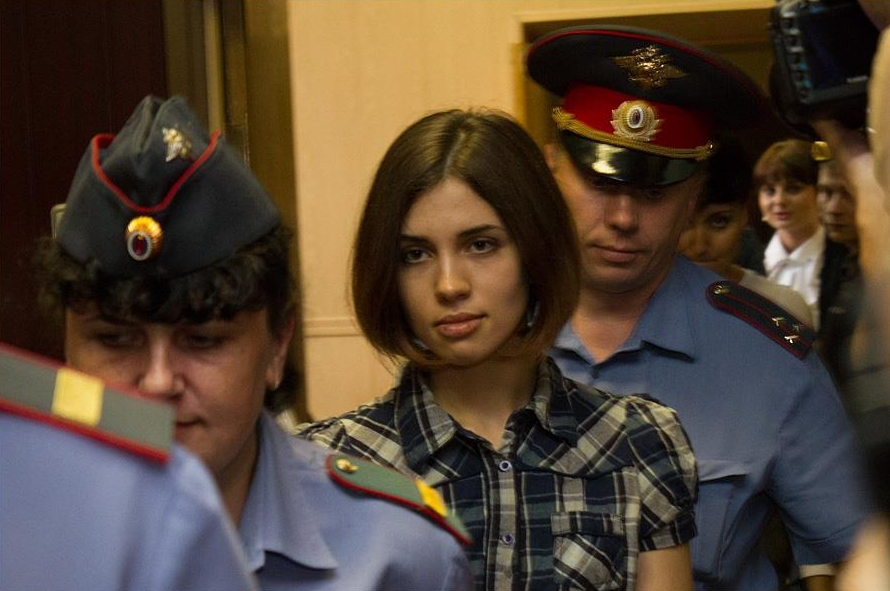
Nadezhda Tolokonnikova

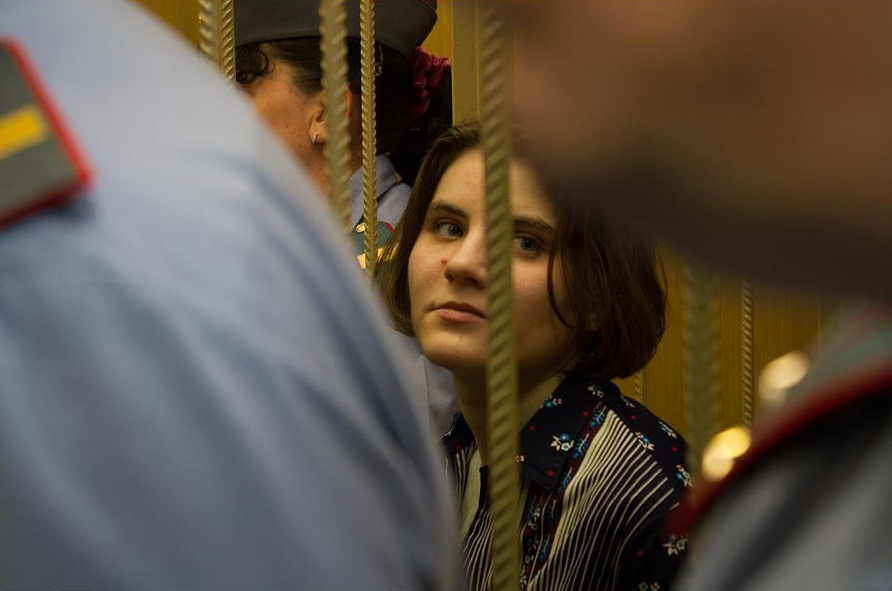
Yekaterina Samutsevich

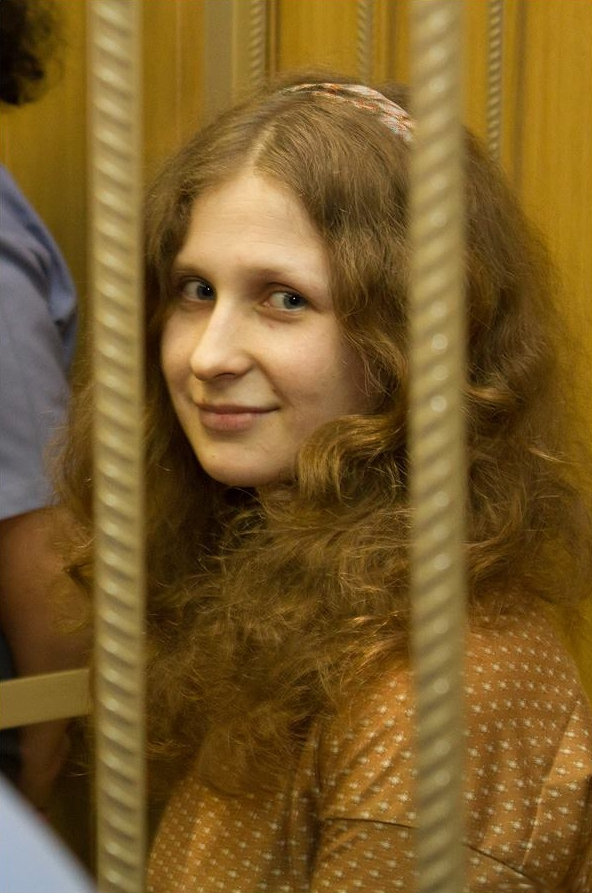
Maria Alyokhina

The three Pussy Riot members at their trial in Tagansky District Court

In August 2012, non-medical use of psychiatry surfaced in the case of "Pussy Riot". The defendants passed through forensic psychiatric examination in the Kashchenko psychiatric hospital outside Moscow, a facility that in Soviet era was heavily involved in political abuse of psychiatry. The psychiatric and psychological report presented by the prosecution alleged that the three women suffered from "personality disorders" and thereby must be isolated from society. However, the defense could not question the experts as they did not come to the court. The report used the language very similar to the qualifications used in Soviet era when diagnosing dissenters. On 25 August 2012, this examination entailed an open letter by Russian psychologist Aleksandr Asmolov who wrote, "In the eyes of the civilized world, our science, psychology in the first place, is turned into an ideological weapon of punishment and repression. First of all, it is a matter of the non-professional use of psychological and psycho-linguistic examination in court practice. The ghost of the insulin Gulag, of punitive science reappears in the country."

=== Mikhail Kosenko ===
On 8 October 2013, a verdict was announced in the case of Mikhail Kosenko. He took part in the protest march at Moscow's Bolotnaya Square on 6 May 2012. Along with other witnesses, Alexander Podrabinek, a former Soviet dissident and currently Radio France Internationale commentator, testified that Kosenko had stood next to him and had not scuffled with police. After just one brief conversation with Kosenko, specialists from the Serbsky Center made a highly questionable diagnosis and the conclusion that Kosenko "presented a danger to himself and others" and "required compulsory treatment." This conclusion ignored his prior diagnosis and the fact that he was not once cited for aggressive or suicidal behavior within 16 months of his pretrial detention in Butyrka prison. A special announcement on the case was issued by the Independent Psychiatric Association of Russia: "On the basis of a conversation that lasted less than one hour, the specialists made the far more serious diagnosis of paranoid schizophrenia instead of the diagnosis of sluggish neurosis-like schizophrenia that Kosenko was treated for over the course of 12 years." The court sent Kosenko for open-ended treatment to a psychiatric hospital. On 19 December 2013, the Commission on Professional Ethics Issues at the Board of the Russian Society of Psychiatrists delivered to the president of the Independent Psychiatric Association of Russia Yuri Savenko, who raised ethical issues concerning Kosenko in publications, a resolution as follows:

Savenko Yu. S. in his public appearances has grossly violated the norms of professional ethics. In numerous declarations, appeals, appearances by Savenko Yu. S. in the media, there are noted impermissible, insulting, offensive statements, which derogate from honour, dignity and goodwill of both individual experts and the expert institution F[ederal] S[tate] B[udgetary] I[nstitution] "the Serbsky S[tate] S[cientific] C[enter for] S[ocial and] F[orensic] P[sychiatry]" and at the same time undermine the authority of the psychiatric community as a whole.

Savenko responded that the strikingly unethical nature of the resolution by the Ethical Commission (of 12 December 2013) showed in the ascription to the IPA open letter to the WPA, hosted on the website, of phrases that were never used there. He adds we see a rather awkward performance of a social role using the old scenario of accusatory campaigns of Soviet times to have the possibility to refer to "the opinion of the professional public" for use abroad.

=== Konstantin Zadoya ===
Konstantin Zadoya was involuntarily admitted to Novosibirsk psychiatric hospital №3 by the request of his father Yuriy Zadoya, the head of the Novosibirsk division of ultra conservative organization "People's Council" supporting Russian Orthodox Church and Vladimir Putin policy, who was frustrated with pro-democracy views of Konstantin. Konstantin was beaten and ill-treated while he was in psychiatric hospital. After leaving the hospital, Konstantin dropped out the medical university and hung himself.

=== Alexander Gabyshev ===
Yakut shaman Alexander Gabyshev, who had envisaged to make a journey on foot from Yakutsk to Moscow and to make a ritual of exorcism of Vladimir Putin's "evil spirit", was detained and sentenced to compulsory treatment in 2020. Numerous public figures demanded the release of Gabyshev.

=== Dmitriy Nadein ===
On 19 July 2021, Dmitry Nadein, Irkutsk political activist and former member of Alexei Navalny staff, was sentenced to compulsory treatment for his reposts on social media.

=== Victoria Petrova ===
In December 2023, Victoria Petrova, arrested in 2022, was sentenced to compulsory treatment for her statements against the Russian invasion of Ukraine on social media. She was tortured and subjected to degrading treatment in the psychiatric hospital. She was freed in August 2024, with obligation of periodic outpatient psychiatric treatment.

=== Maria Ponomarenko ===
Maria Ponomarenko, Siberian journalist and blogger jailed in 2022 for her articles against war in Ukraine, sentenced to 7 years and 10 months for "defamation of Russian army" and then alleged assault on two prison guards. She was subjected to several compulsory treatments following suicide attempts and a hunger strike. In prison and in the psychiatric hospital, she has experienced violence and degrading treatment. In 2025, the court also ordered her to undergo periodic outpatient psychiatric treatment after completing her sentence.

=== Other cases ===
People "complaining to various authorities" are often sent to a psychiatric hospital without indications for the involuntary hospitalization when the only purpose for it is to stop their "paranoiac-litigious activity". When talking about punitive psychiatry, Lyubov Vinogradova of the IPA says, it is now used mostly not in political cases but in those related to family disputes or disputes over apartments.

== Extrajudicial involuntary hospitalizations ==
There are cases when the motive for the unfounded psychiatric hospitalization was the intention of the administration of an orphanage to punish its inmates for their runaways and disobedience. During many involuntary hospitalizations in recent years, the staff of psychiatric hospitals did not follow the mandatory judicial procedure provided by the Law. In 2009, several orphans from the city of Kimovsk in Tula Oblast ran away from their orphanage to a local priest. They told that they were sent to a psychiatric hospital through the explanation of their teachers "for disobedience and the edification of others." The expert report from the Serbsky Center for Forensic Psychiatry showed that they were "mentally healthy."

In 2010, 20 out of 72 orphans from an orphanage in Komsomolsk-on-Amur were placed in a psychiatric hospital and exposed to neuroleptic medication. The city prosecutor found that all the children were placed in the hospital to be treated for "emotional disorders" without having been examined by a commission of psychiatrists or provided for by a court judgment. The children told they had been warned that they would send to a madhouse because of their bad behavior.

In the rurban of Sofino in Moscow Oblast from 2008 to 2011, psychiatric hospitalizations and treatments have been imposed on 23 of 46 inmates who reside in a local orphanage. In March 2011, the Saint Petersburg Commissioner for Child Rights Svetlana Agapitova reported on the hospitalization of four orphans from the orphanage No. 19 as a punishment for their disobedience. The medical records of the children did not contain notes of these hospitalizations.

It is significant that none of the cases has reached a trial and entailed real convictions. All taken measures were limited to the prosecutor's investigation. According to some estimates, a psychiatric diagnosis is given to half of all children who live in state institutions. Infant orphans who came of age and received a diagnosis in a psychiatric hospital are sent to psychoneurological internals without asking their consent. There a new problem arises: quite legally capable people cannot get out of there, work, start their family and live a normal life.

== Reaction ==
The charge that psychiatry is again being abused is not universally accepted within the profession in Russia. In 2006, Vladimir Rotstein, who is the president of Public Initiative on Psychiatry, an advocacy group, stated that the problem of psychiatric persecution or forced treatment existed more than 20 years ago, but it was solved and since then he has not heard of any case of forced psychiatric treatment or examination. However, the Independent Psychiatric Association of Russia states that the number of activists being wrongfully committed to psychiatric institutions totals dozens of cases in recent years. According to its president Yuri Savenko, law enforcement practice, of course, is very far from the letter of the law, forensic psychiatric expert examination has deteriorated because of the lack of competition, and courts implicitly fulfill wishes of the vertical of executive authority affected by corruption. The Russian legislation did not implement Principle 18 of the Principles for the Protection of Persons with Mental Illness and the Improvement of Mental Health Care, approved by the UN General Assembly in 1991, with respect to patient's right to an independent psychiatric report. According to the analysis by psychotherapist Elena Romek, provisions of the Russian Mental Health Law are in conflict with civil rights guaranteed by the Constitution of the Russian Federation, universally recognized norms of international law, professional and ethical norms of medicine, and presumption of innocence. According to representatives of the Moscow Helsinki Group (MHG), the Law does not comply with the European practice of mental health care. The case of Rakevich v. Russia considered in the European Court of Human Rights gave grounds for the following assertion by the head of MHG legal programs Natalia Kravchuk:

… Russian legislation in this area is featureless and vague. It is for this reason that it is so hard for people to assert their rights, and they have to reach the European Court of Human Rights.

In 2006, the Association of American Physicians and Surgeons issued a warning that in the Russian Federation 'psychiatry is used as a tool against dissent.' As mentioned in 2010, reports on particular cases of psychiatric abuse continue to come from Russia where the worsening political climate appears to make an atmosphere in which local authorities feel able to again use psychiatry as a means of frightening. It is the Independent Psychiatric Association of Russia that appears to make very active efforts to communicate their views on the previous and present abuses of psychiatry in Russia to psychiatry in the West.

In October 2014 an artist Petr Pavlensky cut his ear while sitting naked on the roof of the infamous Serbsky Center in protest against punitive psychiatry.

== Sources ==
- "Psychiatry used as a tool against dissent". Association of American Physicians and Surgeons. Archived from the original on 3 October 2006.
- "Activist held in psychiatric hospital". The Washington Times. 29 July 2007.
- Карательная психиатрия в России: Доклад о нарушениях прав человека в Российской Федерации при оказании психиатрической помощи [Punitive psychiatry in Russia: The report on human rights violations in the Russian Federation during providing psychiatric care] (PDF) (in Russian). Moscow: The publishing house of the International Helsinki Federation for Human Rights. 2004. Archived (PDF) from the original on 10 August 2014.
- "Psychiatric abuse claim in Russia". BBC News. 1 August 2007.
- Medicine betrayed: the participation of doctors in human rights abuses. Zed Books. 1992. p. 66. ISBN 1-85649-104-8.
- "Представители ОГФ обратились к Владимиру Лукину по поводу ситуации с Артёмом Басыровым" [The representatives of the United Civil Front applied to Vladimir Lukin in connection with the situation of Artyom Basyrov] (in Russian). 11 December 2007. Archived from the original on 7 April 2012.
- "Открытое письмо НПА Генеральной Ассамблее XI конгресса ВПА" [The open letter by the IPA to the General Assembly of the XI Congress of the WPA]. Nezavisimiy Psikhiatricheskiy Zhurnal [The Independent Psychiatric Journal] (in Russian) (3): 49. 1999. ISSN 1028-8554.
- "Политическое дело аполитичной организации и психиатрия: нестандартное решение Центра им. Сербского" [The political case of an apolitical organization and psychiatry: An unusual decision by the Serbsky Center]. Nezavisimiy Psikhiatricheskiy Zhurnal [The Independent Psychiatric Journal] (in Russian) (3). 2010.
- "Постановление Комиссии правления Российского общества психиатров по вопросам профессиональной этики" [The resolution by the Commission on Professional Ethics Issues at the Board of the Russian Society of Psychiatrists]. The Russian Society of Psychiatrists. 20 December 2013. Archived (PDF) from the original on 16 January 2014.
- Afanasyev, Ivan; Vaganov, Arseniy [Иван Афанасьев, Арсений Ваганов] (30 October 2003). "Европа повязала российских санитаров" [Europe fettered Russian aid-men] (in Russian). Gazeta.ru.
- Agamirov, Karen [Карэн Агамиров] (17 July 2007). "Человек имеет право. Право на защиту от карательной психиатрии" [Man has the right. The right to defence against punitive psychiatry]. Радио Свобода (in Russian). Radio Liberty.
- Argunova, Yuliya [Юлия Аргунова] (2007). Права граждан с психическими расстройствами [The rights of citizens with mental disorders] (in Russian). Moscow: Фолиум [Folium]. p. 9. Archived from the original on 2011-06-27.
- Argunova, Yuliya [Юлия Аргунова] (2011). "Уголовная ответственность за незаконное помещение в психиатрический стационар" [Criminal liability for illegal placement to a psychiatric hospital]. Nezavisimiy Psikhiatricheskiy Zhurnal [The Independent Psychiatric Journal] (in Russian) (4): 36–42. ISSN 1028-8554.
- Asmolov, Alexander [Александр Асмолов] (25 August 2012). "Экспертам профессионального цеха: о психологической экспертизе" [For experts of professional corporation: On psychological examination]. Novaya Gazeta (in Russian).
- Asriyants, Sergei; Chernova, Natalia [Cергей Асриянц, Наталья Чернова] (17 February 2010). "Юрий Савенко и Любовь Виноградова (интервью)" [Yuri Savenko and Lyubov Vinogradova (interview)]. Novaya Gazeta (in Russian). Archived from the original on 24 December 2013.
- Blokhin, Mikhail [Михаил Блохин] (1 March 2012). "Столичные суды начали применять карательную психиатрию" [Courts in the capital started using punitive psychiatry]. Novaya Gazeta (in Russian).
- Blomfield, Adrian (13 August 2007a). "Labelled mad for daring to criticise the Kremlin". The Daily Telegraph.
- Blomfield, Adrian (13 August 2007b). "Asylums used as 'tools of repression'". The Daily Telegraph.
- Bonnie, Richard (2002). "Political Abuse of Psychiatry in the Soviet Union and in China: Complexities and Controversies" (PDF). Journal of the American Academy of Psychiatry and the Law. 1. 30 (1): 136–144. PMID 11931362. Archived from the original (PDF) on 28 September 2011.
- Borodyansky, Georgy [Георгий Бородянский] (18 December 2006). "Охота на души населения" [Hunting for the souls of population]. Novaya Gazeta (in Russian).
- Borodyansky, Georgy [Георгий Бородянский] (27 July 2008). "Омск. С психбольницы, где был поставлен ложный диагноз правозащитнику, решением суда взыскано в его пользу 30 тысяч рублей вместо 2,5 миллионов, заявленных в его иске" [Omsk. The mental hospital that gave a human rights activist a false diagnosis was imposed a penalty of 30 thousand rubles instead of 2.5 million ones demanded in his lawsuit]. Novaya Gazeta (in Russian).
- Brintlinger, Angela; Vinitsky, Ilya (2007). Madness and the mad in Russian culture. University of Toronto Press. ISBN 978-0-8020-9140-6.
- Chernova, Nataliya [Наталья Чернова] (17 February 2014). "Жертвоприношение: К российским детям-сиротам применяются методы карательной психиатрии" [Oblation: Methods of punitive psychiatry are applied to Russian infant orphans]. Novaya Gazeta (in Russian).
- Coalson, Robert (18 April 2013). "Whistle-Blower's Case Revives Concerns Of Punitive Psychiatry In Russia". Radio Free Europe.
- Davidoff, Victor (13 October 2013). "Soviet Psychiatry Returns". The Moscow Times.
- Finn, Peter (30 September 2006). "In Russia, Psychiatry Is Again a Tool Against Dissent". The Washington Post.
- Gee, Alastair (30 July 2007). "Russian dissident 'forcibly detained in mental hospital'". The Independent. Archived from the original on 10 September 2007.
- Gluzman, Semyon [Семён Глузман] (2009). "Этиология психиатрических злоупотреблений: попытка мультидисциплинарного анализа" [The etiology of psychiatric abuses: an attempt at multidisciplinary analysis]. Новости медицины и фармации [Medicine and Pharmacy News] (in Russian). 20 (300): 18–19.
- Gluzman, Semyon [Семён Глузман] (January 2010). "Этиология злоупотреблений в психиатрии: попытка мультидисциплинарного анализа" [The etiology of abuses in psychiatry: an attempt at multidisciplinary analysis]. Нейроnews: Психоневрология и нейропсихиатрия [Neuronews: Psychoneurology and Neuropsychiatry] (in Russian). 1 (20). Archived from the original on 2015-11-17.
- Helmchen, Hanfried; Sartorius, Norman, eds. (2010). Ethics in Psychiatry: European Contributions. Springer. p. 491. ISBN 978-90-481-8720-1.
- Kanterov, Igor [Игорь Кантеров] (2005). "Порочная методология и ее плоды" [Flawed methodology and its fruits]. Nezavisimiy Psikhiatricheskiy Zhurnal [The Independent Psychiatric Journal] (in Russian) (3).
- Kanterov, Igor [Игорь Кантеров] (2010). "На те же грабли" [Been there, done that]. Nezavisimiy Psikhiatricheskiy Zhurnal [The Independent Psychiatric Journal] (in Russian) (3).
- Kotova, Ekaterina [Екатерина Котова] (5 August 2014). "Минздрав поставил диагноз главному сектоведу" [The Ministry of Health gave a diagnosis to the main scholar of sects]. Trud (in Russian). No. 107.
- Krainova, Natalya (28 February 2012). "Jailed Protester Put in Psychiatric Ward". The Moscow Times.
- Larkin, Barbara (2001). International Religious Freedom (2000): Annual Report: Submitted by the U.S. Department of State. DIANE Publishing. p. 369. ISBN 0-7567-1229-7.
- Lavretsky, Helen (1998). "The Russian Concept of Schizophrenia: A Review of the Literature" (PDF). Schizophrenia Bulletin. 24 (4): 537–557. doi:10.1093/oxfordjournals.schbul.a033348. PMID 9853788. Archived from the original (PDF) on 29 July 2014.
- Leonard, Peter (21 January 2010). "Russian poet faces mental ward; some fear return to punitive psychiatry for dissidents". cleveland.com.
- Lipton, Edward (2002). Religious freedom in the Near East, northern Africa and the former Soviet states. Nova Publishers. p. 182. ISBN 1-59033-390-X.
- Metzl, Jonathan (2010). The Protest Psychosis: How Schizophrenia Became a Black Disease. Beacon Press. ISBN 978-0-8070-8592-9.
- Mishina, Irina [Ирина Мишина] (17 December 2012). "Раздвоение личностей: Почему преступников считают здоровыми, а общественных деятелей — законченными психами?" [Dual personalities: Why are criminals considered healthy, while public figures are considered complete madmen?]. Наша версия [Our Version] (in Russian).
- Murphy, Kim (30 May 2006). "Speak Out? Are You Crazy?". Los Angeles Times.
- Mursalieva, Galina [Галина Мурсалиева] (10 December 2007). "Прикладная психиатрия: Оппозиционный журналист наконец выпущен из психбольницы" [Applied psychiatry: The opposition journalist is eventually released from the psychiatric hospital]. Novaya Gazeta (in Russian).
- Nadler, Gerald (15 November 2004). "Ex-Soviet sissidents say Russia is slipping". The Moscow Times.
- Noll, Richard (2007). The encyclopedia of schizophrenia and other psychotic disorders. Infobase Publishing. p. 3. ISBN 978-0-8160-6405-2.
- Nyquist, Jeffrey (17 July 2009). "Marina Kalashnikova's Warning to the West". Global Analysis. Archived from the original on 11 July 2011.
- Ovchinsky, Vladimir [Владимир Овчинский] (29 June 2010). "Российская психиатрия: чего изволите?" [Russian psychiatry: how may I serve you?]. Радио Свобода (in Russian). Radio Liberty.
- Podrabinek, Alexander [Александр Подрабинек] (2 August 2007). "Хотелось бы иметь права" [I would like to have rights]. Novaya Gazeta (in Russian). Archived from the original on 22 May 2011.
- Podrabinek, Alexander [Александр Подрабинек] (27 December 2010). "Не рождественская история" [Not a christmas story]. Ежедневный журнал [Daily Journal] (in Russian).
- Portnikov, Vitaly [Віталій Портников] (27 September 2014). "Путін і Савченко. Діагноз державного ідіотизму" [Putin and Savchenko. The diagnosis for the state idiotism]. Радіо Свобода (in Ukrainian). Radio Liberty.
- Rodriguez, Alex (7 August 2007). "Russian dissidents called mentally ill". Chicago Tribune.
- Romek, Elena [Елена Ромек] (2002). "Психиатрия и права человека" [Psychiatry and human rights]. Психотерапия: теоретическое основание и социальное становление [Psychotherapy: Theoretical foundation and social formation] (in Russian). Rostov-on-Don: Издательство РГУ [The publishing house of the Rostov State University]. pp. 108–131. Archived from the original on 2009-06-01. Archived 2009-06-01 at the Wayback Machine
- Savenko, Yuri [Юрий Савенко] (2004a). "Отчетный доклад о деятельности НПА России за 2000–2003 гг" [The summary report on the activities of the IPA of Russia over 2000–2003]. Nezavisimiy Psikhiatricheskiy Zhurnal [The Independent Psychiatric Journal] (in Russian) (2). ISSN 1028-8554.
- Savenko, Yuri [Юрий Савенко] (2004b). "Тенденции в отношении к правам человека в области психического здоровья" [Trends in the attitude to human rights in the field of mental health]. In Novikova, A. [А. Новикова] (ed.). Права человека и психиатрия в Российской Федерации: Доклад по результатам мониторинга и тематические статьи [Human rights and psychiatry in the Russian Federation: Report on the results of monitoring and subject articles] (in Russian). Moscow: Moscow Helsinki Group. ISBN 5-98440-007-3.
- Savenko, Yuri [Юрий Савенко] (2006). "Технологии использования психиатрии в немедицинских целях снова наготове" [The technologies of using psychiatry for non-medical purposes are again ready]. Nezavisimiy Psikhiatricheskiy Zhurnal [The Independent Psychiatric Journal] (in Russian) (4). ISSN 1028-8554.
- Savenko, Yuri [Юрий Савенко] (2007). "Дело Андрея Новикова. Политическая цензура — не дело психиатров" [The case of Andrey Novikov. Political censorship is not a business for psychiatrists]. Nezavisimiy Psikhiatricheskiy Zhurnal [The Independent Psychiatric Journal] (in Russian). 4.
- Savenko, Yuri [Юрий Савенко] (2009a). "Открытое письмо Президенту Российской Федерации Д.А. Медведеву" [The open letter to the President of the Russian Federation Dmitry Medvedev]. Nezavisimiy Psikhiatricheskiy Zhurnal [The Independent Psychiatric Journal] (in Russian) (2): 5–6. ISSN 1028-8554.
- Savenko, Yuri [Юрий Савенко] (2009b). "20-летие НПА России" [20th anniversary of the IPA of Russia]. Nezavisimiy Psikhiatricheskiy Zhurnal [The Independent Psychiatric Journal] (in Russian) (1): 5–18. ISSN 1028-8554.
- Savenko, Yuri [Юрий Савенко] (2012). "Об антипсихиатрических домыслах" [On antipsychiatric conjectures]. Альманах «Неволя» ["Bondage" Almanac] (in Russian) (28).
- Savenko, Yuri [Юрий Савенко] (1 February 2014). "Президент НПА России Ю.С.Савенко анализирует итоги дела Михаила Косенко" [The President of the IPA of Russia Yu.S. Savenko analyzes the outcomes of the case of Mikhail Kosenko] (in Russian). Independent Psychiatric Association of Russia.
- Savenko, Yuri; Mursalieva, Galina [Юрий Савенко, Галина Мурсалиева] (2007). "Дело Андрея Новикова. Психиатрию в политических целях использует власть, а не психиатры" [The case of Andrei Novikov. Psychiatry for political purposes is used by authority, not psychiatrists]. Nezavisimiy Psikhiatricheskiy Zhurnal [The Independent Psychiatric Journal] (in Russian) (4).
- Semple, David; Smyth, Roger (2013). Oxford handbook of psychiatry. Oxford: Oxford University Press. p. 6. ISBN 978-0-19-969388-7.
- Soloviyova, Galina [Галина Соловьёва] (2008). "Что поддерживает карательную психиатрию" [What supports punitive psychiatry?]. Nezavisimiy Psikhiatricheskiy Zhurnal [The Independent Psychiatric Journal] (2): 50–53. ISSN 1028-8554.
- Trehub, Hanna (22 February 2013). "Political Madness: Dutch Sovietologist Robert van Voren speaks about Soviet repressive psychiatry and its surviving offshoots". The Ukrainian Week.
- Vinogradova, Lubov et al. [Любовь Виноградова и др.] (2008). "Дело в Йошкар-Оле — снова политика в психиатрии" [The case in Yoshkar-Ola: Again politics in psychiatry]. Nezavisimiy Psikhiatricheskiy Zhurnal [The Independent Psychiatric Journal] (in Russian) (1).
- Vladimirov, Alexei [Алексей Владимиров] (2 February 2004). "Острая психическая недостаточность" [Acute mental insufficiency]. Novaya Gazeta, St Peterburg (in Russian).
- Volchek, Dmitry [Дмитрий Волчек] (26 December 2010). "Освободить Алексея Мананникова" [Free Alexey Manannikov]. Радио Свобода (in Russian). Radio Liberty.
- Voltskaya, Tatyana [Татьяна Вольтская] (10 June 2014). "В "психушку" за детские шалости" [Sending to a psikhushka for children mischiefs]. Радио Свобода (in Russian). Radio Liberty.
- Voren, Robert van (January 2010). "Political Abuse of Psychiatry—An Historical Overview". Schizophrenia Bulletin. 36 (1): 33–35. doi:10.1093/schbul/sbp119. PMC 2800147. PMID 19892821.
- Voren, Robert van [Роберт ван Ворен] (2009). "История повторяется и в политической психиатрии" [History repeats itself in political psychiatry too]. Новости медицины и фармации [Medicine and Pharmacy News] (in Russian) (303). Издательский дом «Заславский» ["Zaslavsky" Publishing House].
- Voren, Robert van (2013). Psychiatry as a tool of coercion in post-Soviet countries (PDF). The European Parliament. doi:10.2861/28281. ISBN 978-92-823-4595-5. Russian text: Voren, Robert van [Роберт ван Ворен] (2013). "Психиатрия как средство репрессий в советских и постсоветских странах" [Psychiatry as a tool of coercion in post-Soviet countries]. Вестник Ассоциации психиатров Украины [The Herald of the Ukrainian Psychiatric Association] (in Russian) (5). The Ukrainian Psychiatric Association.
