= Mikhail Kosenko =

Russian activist (born 1975)

Mikhail Aleksandrovich Kosenko (Russian: Михаил Александрович Косенко; born 8 July 1975) is a Russian activist who is a defendant in the Bolotnaya Square case. A participant in a protest against Russian President Vladimir Putin that took place in Bolotnaya Square in Moscow on May 6, 2012, the day before Putin's third-term inauguration, Kosenko was charged with participating in “mass riots” and with “threatening the life or health of a representative of authority.” Although Kosenko and his fellow defendants in the case, Artiom Saviolov and Vladimir Akimenkov, professed their innocence and were backed up by ample video evidence, they were found guilty, with Kosenko sentenced to forced psychiatric treatment.

Kosenko's verdict and sentence were widely condemned as a political abuse of psychiatry, marking a return to the Soviet Union practice of sentencing dissidents to psychiatric hospitals, with one expert describing Kosenko's case as “the first such clear and obvious instance” of “punitive psychiatry” in Russia since Soviet times.

== Early life and education ==
Kosenko was born on July 8, 1975. As a child, he reportedly “loved to read, and always had his head in one history book or another.” “You could say he was a nerd,” his aunt told The New Yorker in 2013, calling him “a real humanist, without any aggression.” He “could have easily enrolled in the history program at Moscow State University,” according to his aunt, but instead went into the Russian Armed Forces, where he “was severely beaten by fellow cadets,” reportedly as part of “a hazing ritual,” and sustained a concussion.

The concussion left Kosenko with mild psychiatric problems. He was diagnosed with mild schizophrenia and declared a mental invalid. For over twelve years after his diagnosis, he received outpatient treatment at a psycho-neurological clinic. During this time, Kosenko, who has been described as “a very shy person, shunning any kind of violence,” who has “a long mustache and droopy eyes,” led “a quiet, normal life, primarily staying inside the Moscow apartment he shared with his sister Ksenia (sometimes transliterated as Kseniya) and her adult son, where he listened to the radio and read books on Communist history. In late 2011 and early 2012, when a large-scale opposition movement broke out into the open in Moscow, it gave Kosenko a chance to take part in something, to be among like-minded people and express his political ideas.” Ksenia told the New Yorker that he viewed this development, which “took him a while to digest,” as “great” and “inspiring.”

== Protest and arrest ==
Kosenko was arrested at the Bolotnaya Square protest on May 6, 2012, released the next day, and fined five hundred rubles, which is approximately equivalent to fifteen or sixteen dollars. “My son and I even laughed,” Ksenia later said, “at how he got off so cheaply.” A month later, on June 8, 2012, a “whole crowd” of men walked into the Kosenko flat “and announced that they had a search warrant. Four of them grabbed Mikhail. He was taken to Petrovka 38, the headquarters of the Moscow police force.”

He was then taken to prison, where the doctors “spent more time asking him about his political affiliations than about his medical background” and refused to give him the medication he had taken regularly for more than a decade, an antipsychotic/antidepressant called thioridazine. Consequently, he “looked terrible.” After his lawyers informed independent journalists about this situation, there was “a small outcry” in the press, and Kosenko began receiving his medicine.

Authorities argued that during a fight that took place between police and protesters during the protest, Kosenko had punched and kicked Alexander Kazmin, an officer of Russia's OMON (Special Purpose Mobile Unit) riot police. Kosenko, who had no police record prior to the Bolotnaya Square clash, was charged under Article 212, Section 2, and Article 318, Section 2, of the Russian Criminal Code.

Ksenia Kosenko later told Amnesty International: “When some people started to fight with a police officer, [Mikhail] just stood there, trying to shield himself. He was taken to the police station and they took a photo of him. When a decision was taken to open a criminal case into mass riots at Bolotnaya Square, they started to compare their photos with the video footage. They had a photo, they found a video, and interpreted them in a certain way. That was it: the charges were ready.” Ksenia was not allowed to see her brother once during the two months following his arrest.

== Diagnosis ==
During the trial investigation, the Serbsky State Scientific Center for Social and Forensic Psychiatry stated that it had diagnosed Kosenko as a paranoid schizophrenic who was “dangerous for himself and others.” The Serbsky doctors made their diagnosis “after just one brief conversation.” The defense asked for a new evaluation, but the request was turned down. Kosenko's case was investigated separately from other cases stemming from the Bolotnaya Square incident because the investigators wanted him to be forcibly subjected to psychiatric treatment.

Kosenko's diagnosis was widely criticized. Russian psychiatrist Andrey Bilzho called it “the death of psychiatry.” Yuri Savenko, a psychiatrist with 50 years of clinical experience who is head of Russia's Independent Psychiatric Association, called the Serbsky diagnosis “outrageous,” telling Kosenko's lawyers that the Serbsky doctors, in evaluating Kosenko, had overlooked 12 years of observations by Kosenko's own doctors, which made it clear that he was not aggressive or violent, that his medications were very mild, and that he had never required hospitalization. “Psychiatry is the most convenient way to save a case when it collapses,” stated Savenko, and called the diagnosis a signal that “the Soviet practice of punitive psychiatry was returning.”

Kosenko's case went to court in October 2012. Kosenko testified that the fight that broke out on Bolotnaya Square had been incited by the riot police and that he had not beaten anyone. Defense witnesses confirmed his testimony. Oleg Orlov of Memorial, a human-rights group, was standing with Kosenko when the fight broke out, and testified that Kosenko had not taken part. Orlov said he was certain that Kosenko didn't commit the crimes of which he was accused. “It's a political trial,” Orlov said, “and Kosenko is a political prisoner who was unfairly convicted.” Alexander Podrabinek, a Soviet-era dissident who was working as a Radio France Internationale commentator at the time of the protest, “testified that Kosenko stood next to him and did not brawl with police.”

The defense presented a video which, according to public defender Dmitriy Borko, clearly showed that Kosenko had not participated in the struggle, and that he was about five meters away from the struggle.

Although Kosenko was accused of causing Kazmin to have a concussion, the charges only indicated that Kosenko had struck Kazmin's body and arm. “The evidence,” according to the New Yorker, “began to look even more flimsy as the process wore on—in another criminal-justice system, it might have looked as if the case were falling apart.” Kazmin himself testified that he didn’t recall being struck by Kosenko, who, he said, had been “simply standing nearby.” Kazmin added: “Even if Kosenko himself inflicted injury, I don’t wish him harm….I don’t want comrade Kosenko to sit in prison.”

Only one witness for the prosecution, a police officer named Sergei Lukyanov, claimed to recognize Kosenko, although his testimony was reportedly “confusing” and he claimed only to have seen Kosenko “moving his arms toward Kazmin,” rather than actually doing anything violent. Lukyanov “was questioned in a closed session, with everyone else in court that day forced into the hallway.”

On November 9, 2012, the Basmanny district court in Moscow ordered the extension of the pre-trial detention and other restrictions placed on Kosenko. The court rejected an appeal of this decision by the defense counsel, arguing that Kosenko's continued imprisonment was justified by the seriousness of the accusation against Kosenko and the danger of flight or continued criminal activity on the part of the defendant.

On December 20, 2012, P.N. Gusev, Editor-in-Chief of the newspaper Moskovsky komsomolets; L.M. Alekseeva, Chair of the Moscow Helsinki Group and of the board of the Foundation for the Defense of Prisoners’ Rights; L.A. Ponomarev, Executive Director of the All-Russian Movement for Human Rights; N.A. Tagankina, Executive Director of the Moscow Helsinki Group; and V.V. Yakov, Editor-in-Chief of the newspaper Novye Izvestiya, sent a letter to Olga Aleksandrovna Egorova, Chair of the Moscow City Court, asking that the court trying Kosenko “be allowed to make rulings strictly in accordance with the law, based on unconditional adherence to the code of criminal procedure, as well as the principles of humanity and fairness, giving priority to the human rights guaranteed by the Constitution of the Russian Federation.”

Kosenko took part in the hearing by video-link from Butyrka prison. A Human Rights Watch representative was in court. The judge denied a petition for a new psychiatric evaluation of Kosenko.

When permitted to speak in court, Kosenko did not address the specifics of his case but chose rather to comment on the larger picture. “Our people have become used to suffering,” he said, and criticized Russia's “Eastern model of society,” in which “a lack of freedom is exchanged for a comfortable life” and the people are subjected to the “eternal tenure of a single regime.” Joshua Yaffa of the New Yorker wrote: “If nothing else—as if it hadn’t been clear long before—these were not the words of an unstable, dangerously clouded mind.”

Kosenko, whose sister's letters to him were returned by the censors, learned of his mother's death through the media and was not allowed to attend her funeral in September 2013.

== Verdict ==
Kosenko's verdict was pronounced on October 8, 2013, in Moscow's Zamoskvoretski District Court. It took Judge Lyudmila Moskalenko almost two hours to read her verdict. She found Kosenko guilty and ordered him sent to a psychiatric clinic. “The court has come to the conclusion that at the time the action was committed by Kosenko...he was in a state of insanity,” Moskalenko told the court. When she finished reading the verdict, the audience shouted “shame.” Outside the court, according to one source, “dozens of people gathered in a peaceful protest” and shouted the word “freedom.” Another source reported that the crowd outside the courtroom “chanted ‘Misha!’ so loudly that Judge Lyudmila Moskalenko could barely be heard in the courtroom.”

Opposition leader Alexei Navalny was in court for the reading of the verdict, and later said that Kosenko had behaved “calmly and courageously” and had set an “example for us all.”

== Reaction to verdict ==
”The most valued thing in the country is freedom,” Kosenko wrote after his verdict was handed down. Both the verdict and the sentence caused widespread outrage.

“It's definitely a revival of punitive medicine,” Olga Romanova, a journalist and human-rights activist, told CBS News. “And that's the most horrible thing of all. I think one can only envy those who will be sentenced to prison terms and not to treatment in a medical institution, a Russian medical institution.” Human-rights activist and Soviet-era dissident Alexander Podrabinek, author of a book about the political abuse of psychiatry in the Soviet Union, agreed: “This is a clear case of a return to punitive psychiatry in Russia," he said. “This is the first such clear and obvious instance in the post-Soviet period.”

The Independent Psychiatric Association of Russia issued a special statement about the case, stating that “On the basis of a conversation that lasted less than one hour, the specialists made the far more serious diagnosis of paranoid schizophrenia instead of the diagnosis of sluggish neurosis-like schizophrenia that Kosenko was treated for over the course of 12 years.” In the Russian periodical Snob, three Russian psychiatrists criticized Kosenko's sentence and rejected the prosecution's claim that he was dangerous. Writing in the Moscow Times under the headline “Soviet Psychiatry Returns,” Victor Davidoff described Kosenko's trial as “right out of the Franz Kafka playbook.” Davidoff noted that the Serbsky diagnosis “not only contradicted the diagnosis of the psychiatrist who has treated Kosenko for many years, but also ignores his behavior in prison.”

“The Russian authorities should end the injustice against Kosenko,” said Tanya Lokshina, Russia program director at Human Rights Watch. “Kosenko should never have been forced to spend 16 months behind bars on grossly disproportionate charges, and now he faces indefinite, forced psychiatric treatment.” Amnesty International, which attended court hearings and determined that Kosenko's innocence had been “overwhelmingly” demonstrated by video footage and eyewitness testimony, declared Kosenko a prisoner of conscience and said that his sentence was “an abhorrent return to the Soviet-era practices used to silence dissent” and that the system's treatment of Kosenko smacked of “the worst excesses of the now defunct Soviet era when dissidents were languishing in mental institutions, treated as mental patients only because they dared to speak their mind.”

In an October 9, 2013, New Yorker article headlined “The Insanity of Protesting against Putin,” Joshua Yaffa reported that the state was presenting the Bolotnaya Square case as a conspiracy that had been planned abroad, and that Kosenko was the first of twenty-eight people charged in the case to receive a verdict. “At the very least,” wrote Yaffa, “his case sends a signal about the Kremlin’s rapaciousness not just in prosecuting the Bolotnaya defendants but in its desire to clamp down on all those in the opposition or sympathetic to it.”

Noting that “Kosenko was certainly not one of the leading figures of last year’s protest,” Raluca Besliu of the International Policy Digest stated that “This means that no one is truly safe from the regime’s increasing ire. If he received such a terrifying sentence, what types of punishments can key opposition members expect from Putin’s Soviet-style crackdown? The less Russia’s general public reacts to these cruel punishments, the more leverage it grants to the Kremlin to intensify its oppression of the opposition. Only a few hundred people gathered to hear the verdict in Kosenko’s case. Have Russians become so indifferent to Putin’s behavior that not even the revival of Soviet punitive psychiatric mechanisms can motivate a revolt against an increasing repressive regime?”

Amnesty reported on December 2, 2013, that Kosenko was “not receiving regularly the medication he needs.”

== Appeal and aftermath ==
On March 25, 2014, the Moscow City Court upheld the verdict on appeal. Kosenko's sister Maria said afterwards that she and her brother had had “a small thread of hope that maybe some sort of mercy and fairness was possible, but it turned out that it wasn't. This was just another charade of Russian justice, which doesn't in fact exist.” Kosenko's lawyers said they would file another appeal but added that they did not have much hope for a favorable verdict.
