= Larisa Arap =

Russian opposition activist

Larisa Ivanovna Arap (Russian: Лариса Ивановна Арап; born 1958) is a Russian opposition activist who became a victim of involuntary commitment in the psychiatric facilities of Murmansk and Apatity, soon after publishing her article about mistreatment of patients in the same hospital where she was committed in July 2007. She was released after 46 days of confinement, on 20 August 2007.

== Publication ==
Arap's story, entitled "Durdom" ("Madhouse"), was prepared by journalist Ilona Novikova and published on 8 June 2007 in the Murmansk edition of the newspaper "Marsh Nesoglasnykh" (named after the "Dissenters' March"). The newspaper is a part of the United Civil Front, an opposition coalition led by former world chess champion Garry Kasparov. Her story described crimes that allegedly took place at the Apatity psychiatric facility, including the following:

- Murder of mental patients in order to harvest their organs for transplantation.
- Forcing children to kiss and massage the legs of staff members at the hospital; children who refused were punished by electroshock 'therapy'.
- Rape and torture of people in the psychiatric wards.
- Keeping sane but 'inconvenient' people in the hospital, such as a woman who complained about the rape of her daughter, or another woman who was imprisoned in the Apatity psikhushka to enable confiscation of her property.

== Involuntary hospitalization ==
On 5 July 2007, Arap went to a clinic in the closed city of Severomorsk for the results of a medical examination, which she had passed a month earlier to renew her driver’s license. Doctor Olga Reshet asked her whether she was the author of the "Madhouse" article. After receiving a confirmation from Arap that she was indeed the author, Dr. Reshet told her to wait outside and called militsiya (Russian police), who detained Arap until the arrival of a psychiatric ambulance.

Arap was injected with drugs that caused her tongue to swell, weakened her, and affected her vision and balance, according to her relatives. The detention was illegal, since a decision of a judge authorizing her detention and treatment was issued subsequently, thirteen days later.

Using her mobile phone, Arap called her husband, Dmitri Tereshin, who came from Murmansk to Severomorsk to help her, but she had already been moved to Murmansk. The personnel of the facility refused to give her husband information regarding the reason for the hospitalization. That same evening, their daughter Taisiya came to the facility with her husband. The duty medic, Yulya Kopyia, told them that publication of the article "Madhouse" proved Arap's insanity. Kopyia also said that Taisiya would be put into the psychiatric hospital, too, if she insisted on obtaining documents relating to Arap's hospitalization. Taisiya was later fired from her job in a local bank for "giving too many interviews about her mother."

Two days later, on 7 July 2007, Arap's husband and daughter were allowed to visit her at the hospital. Arap claimed that she was severely beaten by the medical personnel and had bruises all over her body. She was tied to her bed and treated with unidentified 'sedatives'. To protest, Arap went on a five-day hunger strike, and was eventually fed by force.

== Court decision ==
On 18 July 2007, a court in Murmansk sanctioned hospitalization of Arap. The court ignored requests from Arap's husband and daughter to release her. Relatives insisted that she was not a danger to herself or society. Svetlana Lukicheva, Arap's advocate, submitted the complaint to the Regional Court. Arap's husband forwarded the complaint to the regional court and regional health care institutions.

== Commission ==
On 30 July 2007, Vladimir Lukin chose a commission headed by Yuri Savenko, president of the Independent Psychiatric Association of Russia, to investigate Arap's hospitalization. According to Yuri Savenko, the forceful hospitalization of Arap was completely unwarranted. At the same time he said that Arap "showed signs of mental instability" and that Arap admitted to being briefly hospitalized for stress and insomnia in 2004. Savenko explained his assessment of the situation as follows: "We studied medical documents and materials related to the case, and spent an hour and a half with her. The result was that we came to the conclusion that we're dealing with a person who is in fact ill. There are no 'politics' behind this. However, the politicization of our entire life is such that these patients become the first victims of the situation." He also said that "We're returning to this Soviet scenario when psychiatric institutions are used as punitive instruments," and added that "I call this not even punitive psychiatry but police psychiatry, when the main aim is to protect the state rather than to treat sick people."

== Release ==
Arap was released from the hospital on August 20, but she was forced to sign an agreement to continue medical treatment, and wait for the next decision of the court. According to her, she was severely beaten and suffered spine damage in the hospital. She was told by doctors during her release that "Everything in the court is under our control. Doctors, police, and prosecutors are the same team. You have nowhere to go. ... We are letting you go, but you must think about your family."

The decision of court about the involuntary hospitalization of Arap remains in force.

After her release, Arap, who had previously suffered only from mild depression, described her ordeal:

"I feel very sick... I have no idea what they gave me but I have memory loss. I lost all sense of time and can’t remember much of what they did to me. They tied and beat me. It was torture. I saw other perfectly sane people inside." - Arap

== See also ==
- Human rights in Russian psychiatric facilities
- Psikhushka
- Alexander Podrabinek
