= Yakut nationalism =

Turkic ethnic group ideology

the Flag of the Sakha Republic is often used as the cultural flag of the Yakuts.

Flag of the short-lived Provisional Tungus Central National Government, which aimed to establish an independent nation in Sakha. This flag is no longer used.

Yakut nationalism refers to the belief that the Yakuts (or Sakha) should constitute an independent nation. Some attempts have been made to create an independent state for the Yakut people, such as the Tungus Republic, while others aimed for higher autonomy within Russia, such as the Yakut revolt.

== History of the conquest of Yakutia ==
The formation of the Yakut people (Sakha) and its culture (language, religion, craftsmanship and agricultural practices) took place in territories far removed from the Middle Prileniya. The dominant concept in Yakut historiography is that of the multi-ethnic origin of the Sakha people. The basin of the Middle Lena attracted various tribes of nomadic herders as a place of permanent settlement for many centuries. In the spacious valleys on the left bank of the Lena (Erkeeni, Tuimaada, Ensieli, etc.), an ecosystem was formed that made it possible to live here all year round and graze cattle. It was here that the cultural core of the Yakut ethnos was formed.

At the time when colonizers from the Russian state arrived here in the XVII century, the Yakuts were mainly engaged in cattle breeding (cows, horses), wintering in warm stationary houses and migrating with herds in the warm season. The Sakha people had sufficiently developed metallurgy, which made it possible to equip warriors with iron armor, kylys, long-range bows and spears with metal tips.

The surviving heroic epic of the Sakha people tells about the leader Tygyn, the Toyon (head) of the Khangalas tribe and Khangalas Toyonate who lived on the Tuimaada plain on the left bank of the Lena River (the territory of present-day Yakutsk). Tygyn owned huge herds and commanded an impressive army, thanks to which he gained influence among all Yakut clans. It is believed that due to his efforts to unite Yakut tribes in the XVII century Yakutia was on the verge of creating a unified state, which was prevented by the Moscow invasion.

Cossacks from Muscovy (Pantelei Demidovich Pyanda, Anton Dobrynsky and others) in the XVII century organized numerous campaigns in Siberia for yasak, accompanied by robbery and murder of the local population. In Russian chronicles these actual bandit raids were described as "bringing them under the sovereign's hand and collecting yasak".

The actions of the Cossacks were strongly opposed by the local population. There are many cases when Yakuts besieged and burned Russian ostrogi. For example, in 1631 the Yakuts besieged the Dobrynsky stockaded town at the mouth of the Vilyuy River, and in 1632 a thousand Yakut mounted warriors, led by the sons of Tygyn, wrested the looted yasak from the invaders from the group of the Moscow collector Ivashka Galkin. Nevertheless, the Yakuts' attempts to defend their lands and way of life led the Moscow tsar to increase the number of soldiers to "subdue" the unruly population of Siberia.

The year 1632 is considered to be a conventional date of "voluntary entry of Yakutia into the Russian state". In fact, there was no notion of any goodwill. Armed detachments of Russian Cossacks seized Yakut and Tungus settlements, plundered them, and the adult male population was either killed or taxed. From the texts of Russian documents from that period it can be concluded that the Russian invaders treated the local population with contempt, called them savages and foreigners, while engaging in outright robbery and violence.

There are seven major Yakut anti-colonial uprisings that took place during the period of the so-called "voluntary annexation": 1633-1634, 1636-1637, 1639-1640, 1642, 1675-1676, 1681-1682, and 1683-1684. Moscow was ready to hold Siberia at any price, because in the XVII century more than 60% of the infusions into the Kremlin treasury came from there. All rebellions were brutally suppressed, and local leaders were tortured and defiantly executed.

In 1646, the Nama toyon Mymak, supported by other Yakut clans, destroyed the "servants" who were conducting the yasak census. Yakut detachments started an attack on the Yakutsk ostrog, but for unknown reasons stopped two versts away from it, and soon dispersed to their uluses. In 1654 Yakuts attacked the Ust-Vilyuisk winter camp of Moscow servants. In 1675 the toyon of the Yarkan volost Timirev chased away yasak collectors from his lands. In 1682 toyon Jennik with his warriors made several unsuccessful attempts to seize Yakutsk. On September 27 the Yakuts were defeated by the army of the Moscow kingdom, the captives were subjected to cruel tortures and executions. Jennik himself was wounded, captured and soon killed.

Probably, the overwhelming amount of information about the uprisings, as well as the names of Yakut heroes-fighters for freedom have not been preserved, because at that time Yakuts had only oral transmission of folk history at their disposal. Nevertheless, even based on Russian chronicles, one can conclude that the Yakut people resisted the Moscow colonizers for tens and even hundreds of years. Since the late 1780s, the process of mass Christianization of the Yakut population began. Russian clergy fought against the religion of the Yakut people, shamanic attributes were taken away and destroyed. At baptism children were given Orthodox names, due to which in a few decades traditional Yakut names practically disappeared from use. Any education was also supposed to be exclusively in Russian.

== Period of Soviet power ==
During the mass unrest in the 1905 revolution and the collapse of the Russian Empire during World War I, political leaders in several indigenous national communities declared autonomy or full independence from Russia. These included Sakha-Yakut nationalists and an assortment of political groups who proclaimed Yakutia (the largest entity in Siberia) as an independent state in February 1918.

On July 1, 1918, Soviet power was established in Yakutia. Anti-Soviet uprisings on the territory of Yakut province broke out after repressions and red terror of communists against local peoples, mainly Yakuts, Evenks and Eveny. From September 1921 to June 1923, military actions lasted on the territory of Yakut province, then YASSR and Okhotsk region. The reason for the Yakut rebellion was the dissatisfaction of the local population with the policy of the Bolsheviks, their labor mobilization, prodrazverstka, deprivation of voting rights of the Yakut intelligentsia.

In 1924 in Yakutia began the armed Tunguska uprising (1924-1925), led by representatives of the indigenous peoples of the North in Yakutia and in some areas of the Northeast. One of the reasons for the uprising was the brutal policy of the local authorities: closing ports to foreign trade, restricting domestic trade, interrupting the importation of goods from the mainland, confiscating reindeer from private owners, seizing vast pastures for new industrial buildings.

In 1927, the Mlado-Yakut Party of Confederalists mutinied. The armed coup attempt on the territory of the YASSR was one of the most famous examples of organized resistance against Soviet power and its policies on the territory of Yakutia. The Confederalists sought to achieve independence of the YASSR from the RSFSR.

As a result of their defeat, repression against intellectuals in Yakutia increased significantly; the Yakut nationalist and leader of the anti-Bolshevik movement Pavel Vasilyevich Ksenofontov and other leaders of the uprising (Oyunsky, Ammosov, etc.) were arrested and subsequently killed in the Kommunarka shooting ground of the NKVD in Moscow.

In the middle of 1929, a widespread purge of non-party people disloyal to the new authorities and members of the local Communist Party itself, accused of counter-revolution, began. This provoked a new, Bulun uprising, which was also brutally suppressed.

After the final establishment of Soviet power in the region, any information about the Siberian revolts was actively concealed, and the image of "friendship of peoples" and loyalty of Yakuts to Moscow was maintained.

At the same time, there is information from Russian military historians about the uprisings of Yakuts and Nenets in December 1942. The scale of the uprisings was such that military aviation had to be used against the rebels - and this at a time when most of the military equipment was on the western front. The Soviets even created a special operational leadership body to eliminate the rebels. The press described the rebels as bandits and escaped convicts attacking gold mines.

In addition, the Yakut people were subject to deportation under Stalinism. Forced resettlement in Churapcha ulus resulted in significant losses of the Yakut population (more than 1,700 people), mainly among the elderly, women and children.

In April 1986, thousands of Yakuts marched under the slogan “Yakutia for the Yakuts”.

== Period of the Russian Federation ==
On September 27, 1990, Yakutia proclaimed state sovereignty (the day is a national holiday in the Republic of Sakha). In June 2009, the State Assembly of the Sakha Republic was forced to adopt amendments to its constitution, and all references to the sovereignty of Yakutia were removed. Additionally, in 2014, the title of President of the Sakha Republic was renamed to Head of the Sakha Republic, based on a bill proposed in May 2012, with the position of vice president being abolished.

Since Vladimir Putin came to power, the standard of living in the republic has become critically low. The huge public debt is constantly growing. At the same time, a huge amount of diamonds and oil is mined in Yakutia. The Yakut language has come under threat from Russian federal authorities to be removed from mandatory teaching in schools, which has led to protests. However, it is still mandatory to learn in Yakutia.

In 2017, the Sakha people came out to a rally in defense of Yakutia's subsoil resources. The action, organized by the Somogo Kuus (United Force) NGO, was attended by over 1,500 people.

In the spring of 2019, Yakut shaman Alexander Gabyshev, together with like-minded people, went on a hike to Moscow to conduct a "rite of expulsion of Putin". The hike caused a great resonance in the press. A mass protest action was held in Chita in support of the shaman. Alexander Gabyshev was detained a few weeks later on the border of Buryatia and Irkutsk region. He was sent to a psychoneurological dispensary, and later opened a criminal case allegedly for calls to extremism. The police also detained the shaman's supporters.

n 2022, Yakut activist Aikhal Ammosov was subjected to multiple administrative and criminal proceedings. He was fined for anti-war graffiti under hooliganism statutes, including for the inscription “Yakutia will be free” on a banner commemorating the centenary of the Yakut ASSR. He was later charged under legislation prohibiting the “discrediting” of the Russian Armed Forces for displaying the slogan “No to War” in Russian, Yakut, and English. Following his arrest, Ammosov was held in a detention facility for five days. Ammosov later stated that he was subjected to threats and the use of force while in custody. He subsequently left Russia and relocated to Kazakhstan, where he was later reported missing after being detained by unidentified individuals. Acquaintances stated that he had previously been questioned by Kazakh law enforcement authorities.

During the Russian invasion of Ukraine, at least four convictions have been handed down in Yakutia under the article on "discrediting the Russian Armed Forces". Three residents of Yakutia were convicted for calling for peace on social networks, one - for a solitary picket. The trials were held in closed mode.

Despite threats from the authorities, Yakutian activists do not give up and continue their guerrilla war for an independent Yakutia. Yurt Community is a London-based anti-war movement of indigenous peoples of Russia. Its representative Lidia Grigorieva spoke about the launch of the "Indigenous Languages Navigator" - a unified platform for the preservation and distribution of educational and other materials for learning the languages of various ethnic groups of Russia.

With the outbreak of hostilities in Ukraine, the call for the decolonization of Russia became one of the most prominent political slogans. During wartime, inequality has only increased, manifested in the mass conscription of soldiers from the national republics, in everyday racism, and in the lack of political voice of many peoples, including Yakuts.

Activists from the national republics have named 2023 "The Year of Decolonization of Russia." Their goal is to prove that the Sakha region has never voluntarily become part of Russia and should be autonomous. In addition, they emphasize that Russia is pursuing a violent policy towards indigenous peoples who do not want to participate in the war against Ukraine.

In 2023, the film "Aita", which became the highest-grossing Yakut film, was removed from Russian online cinemas at the request of Roskomnadzor. The agency found in it "destructive information contrary to the principles of unity of the peoples of Russia". The Yakut film "The Candidate" did not receive a distribution license allegedly because of "LGBT propaganda".

Well-known activists openly advocating the secession of the Sakha Republic from the Russian Federation are Nikita Andreev (civil activist, one of the members of the Free Nations of Post-Russia Forum) and Vladislav Ammosov (advocating the creation of the Siberian Legion for the armed struggle for the independence of the Sakha Republic). In 2023, the activists established the Committee for the Independence of the Sakha Republic.
