= Bolotnaya Square case =

Russian criminal case over 2012 protests

The Bolotnaya Square case is a criminal case by the Investigative Committee of the Russian Federation on account of alleged mass riots (article 212 of the Russian Criminal code) and alleged violence against the police (article 318 of the Russian Criminal code) during the "March of the Millions" on May 6, 2012 at the Bolotnaya Square in Moscow. The demonstration was one of the biggest protests in Russia since the 1990s. By the number of accused, 37 persons, it is currently the largest criminal case against participants of public demonstrations in modern Russia.

The Bolotnaya Square case is largely recognized as politically motivated both internationally and in Russia. The Russian Human Rights Ombudsman Vladimir Lukin has repeatedly stated that "there were no riots in Bolotnaya Square". The Memorial Human Rights Centre recognized the case as politically motivated. The European Court of Human Rights issued numerous verdicts wherein it ruled that in the Bolotnaya Square case Russia violated European Convention on Human Rights. The European Parliament issued resolutions 2013/2667(RSP) of June 13, 2013 and resolution 2014/2628(RSP) of March 13, 2014 on the political nature of the Bolotnaya Square case. Amnesty International recognised the defendants in the case as prisoners of conscience.

Overall, 37 people were officially accused, most of them were men and five were women. The majority of them were kept under arrest, several under house arrest, and one escaped abroad.

Fearing persecution, several other people, who had not yet been officially accused, left Russia and have been granted asylum in Estonia, Finland, Germany, Lithuania, Portugal, Spain and Sweden, while Aleksandr Dolmatov committed suicide in the Netherlands detention centre after his political asylum application was turned down.

The case also included a crackdown against the Russian opposition leaders. Houses of Alexei Navalny, Sergey Udaltsov, Kseniya Sobchak, Boris Nemtsov, Ilya Yashin and Pyotr Verzilov were searched. Garry Kasparov and Sergey Guriyev left Russia in 2013.

The supporters of the arrested created the May 6 Committee, an independent organization set up to conduct its own investigation and defend those charged in connection with the rally. Dozens of prominent musicians and artists publicly supported the prisoners of the Bolotnaya Square case, among them Anti-Flag, Ken Loach, Yuri Shevchuk, Noize MC, Boris Akunin, Dmitry Spirin.

On December 19, 2013 a large-scale amnesty was declared in Russia to mark the 20th anniversary of the Russian Constitution. The amnesty was granted to some 13 defendants in the Bolotnaya Square case, alongside the accused in the two other high-profile political cases, the Pussy Riot group and Greenpeace activists who blocked the Prirazlomnaya oil platform in the Pechora Sea. In 2014, the remaining defendants in the Bolotnaya Square case who did not fall under the amnesty received prison sentences varying from 2.5 to 4.5 years. By the end of 2018, all of them were released after having served their sentence.

After the trial was finished, the prosecution attempted new arrests and charges. In December 2016, a new accused, Dmitry Buchenkov, was detained. He was later put under house arrest, fled Russia and was granted asylum in Lithuania in June 2018. In July 2018, the Russian Ministry of Interior filed lawsuit against several defendants in the Bolotnaya case for the loss by the police of rubber sticks and radio stations. The court ruled to refuse to satisfy the claim.

The statute of limitations for the Bolotnaya Square case expired on 6 May 2022.

== The accused ==
The accused include more than thirty participants of the demonstration.

=== Vladimir Akimenkov ===
Born in 1987. An activist with the "Left Front" organization. He was taken into custody on June 10, 2012, and held in pre-detention prison No. 5 in Moscow. He faced charges of participating in mass riots (article 212 of the Russian Criminal Code) which carries a sentence of up to eight years in prison. He was accused of throwing a flag pole at a policeman. The only piece of evidence for the indictment was testimony provided by Special Unit policeman Egorov, the only witness.

Akimenkov suffers from serious inborn eye diseases such as severe myopia, partial atrophy of the eye nerve and coloboma of the iris. In prison his eyesight seriously deteriorated. In September 3,500 people signed a petition demanding his hospitalization. He was transferred to the prison hospital. The doctors described his condition as satisfactory. On October 29 in court Vladimir insisted that his eyesight was getting even weaker.

Different civic activists organized numerous actions in support of Vladimir Akimenkov. In court on November 26, his lawyer Dmitry Agranovsky presented letters, offering to put up bail for Akimenkov, from the Parliament member Ilya Ponomarev, the human rights activist Lev Ponomarev, the writer Ludmila Ulitskaya and the human rights activist Ludmila Alekseeva.

On May 16, 2013, Akimenkov's custody extension was annulled by the Moscow City Court and he was to be freed on June 10. However, on June 6, as preliminary hearings began, all the defendants were remanded again until November 24th. Akimenkov was amnestied in December 2013.

=== Oleg Arhipenkov ===
Born in 1985. A commercial manager of a travel agency. He was detained on May 6, 2012, on the Teatralnaya rather than on the Bolotnaya square which is indicated in the court papers. On June 10 he was arrested for allegedly participating in the mass riots (article 212 of the Russian Criminal Code), facing up to eight years in prison. On August 9 he was released under recognizance not to leave the city, but was not cleared of charges. He was amnestied in December 2013.

=== Fyodor Bakhov ===
Born in 1981. A chemical scientist. Arrested on June 10, 2012. He was accused of participating in mass riots (paragraph 2, article 212 of the Russian Criminal Code), facing up to eight years in prison. By the advice of the court-appointed lawyer he wrote a letter of confession and was immediately arrested for two months. After seeing a lawyer hired by the human rights organizations he rapidly denounced his previous confession. He spent five months in the pretrial detention prison and was released under pledge not to leave the city on November 6. The charges remained in place. He was amnestied in December 2013.

=== Andrey Barabanov ===
Born in 1990, an artist. Arrested on June 28, 2012, he was kept in the pre-trial detention prison No. 2. He was accused of participating in a mass riot (article 212 of the Russian Criminal Code) and using force against a representative of the authorities (article 318 of the Russian Criminal Code). He faced up to thirteen years in prison. He was accused of kicking a Special Unit policeman (Kruglov) with his foot. He pleaded guilty to violating the article 318 but not guilty to violating the article 212, stating that there had not been any mass riots on the Bolotnaya square.

At his court session on December 3, his lawyer Svetlana Sidorkina said that Andrey Barabanov had sent a letter of apology to the injured party (Kruglov), who had accepted his apology and agreed to settle the case by the reconciliation of the parties.

Andrey Barabanov was remanded until November 24, 2013. He was sentenced to 3 years and 7 months in prison.

=== Maria Baronova ===
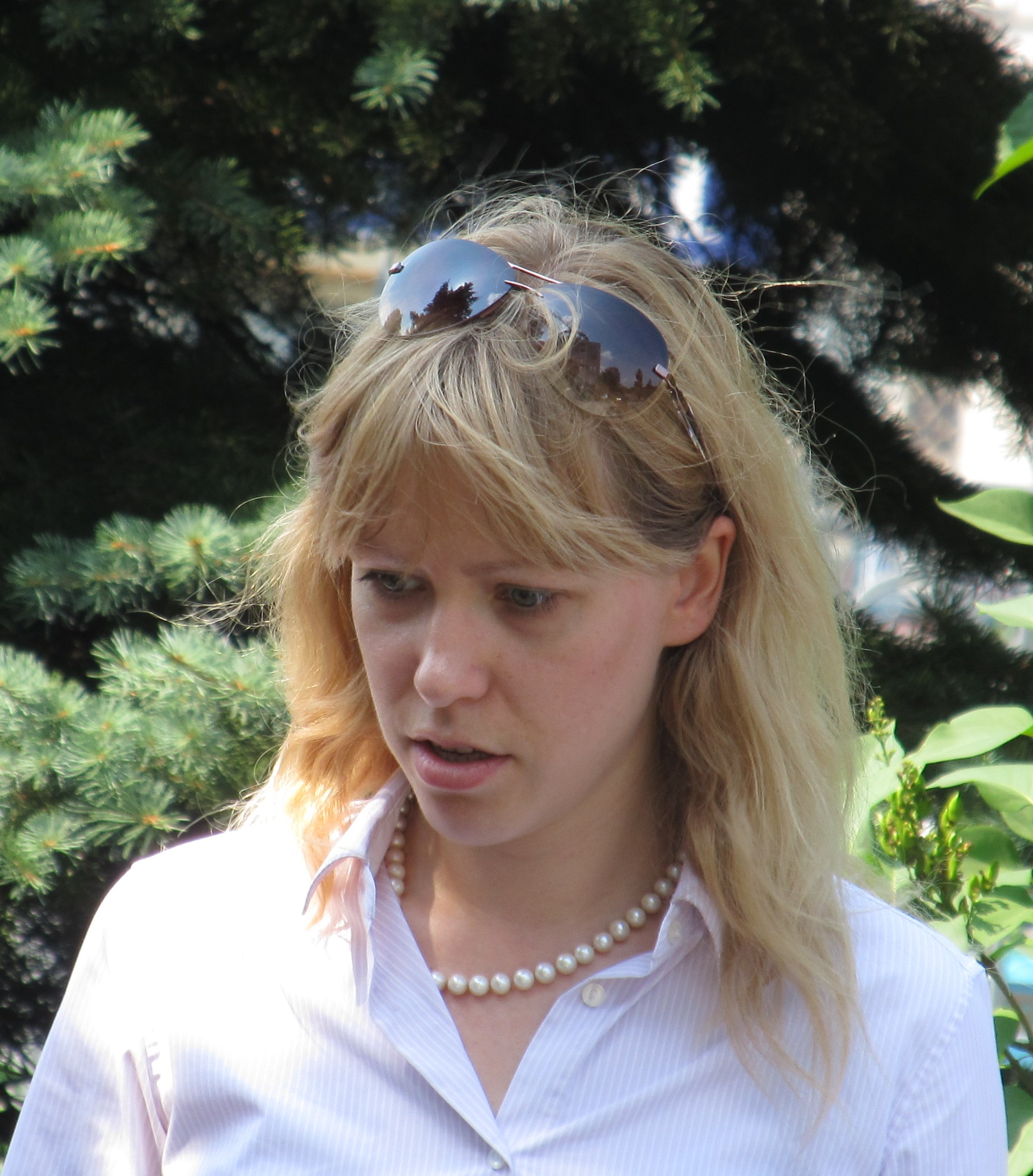
Maria Baronova near Moscow Court 2013-07-04.

Born in 1984. An activist of the "Party of December 5th". On June 21, 2012, she was accused of calling for mass riots (paragraph 3, article 212 of the Russian Criminal Code). The accusation was based on a videotape that showed Maria allegedly quarreling with a policeman. She was later placed under pledge not to leave the city. Baronova was amnestied in December 2013.

=== Yaroslav Belousov ===
Born in 1991. A student of the Moscow State university, married, with a little son. Arrested on June 9, 2012, he was kept in the pretrial detention prison No. 5 in Moscow. He was accused of participating in mass riots (paragraph 2, article 212 of the Russian Criminal Code) and of using force against a representative of the authorities (paragraph 1, article 318 of the Russian Criminal Code). He faced up to thirteen years in prison. He was accused of throwing a billiard ball at a Special Unit policeman. This indictment was founded upon testimony provided by the injured party (Filippov). The State Duma member Tetekhin and around ten municipal deputies in Moscow wrote guarantees for Yaroslav Belousov. Belousov's family offered to put up bail.

Yaroslav Belousov was remanded until November 24, 2013. He was sentenced to 2 years and 6 months in prison.

=== Dmitry Buchenkov ===
On December 2, 2016, Dmitry Buchenkov, who claims he was not in Moscow on the day of the demonstration, was detained. He was released from jail and put under house arrest in 2017. He then secretly fled Russia and was granted asylum in Lithuania in June 2018. In December 2019, the prosecution in Russia demanded an 8-year term in jail for Buchenkov. He was sentenced to 2 years and 5 months in prison. He currently lives in exile.

=== Alexandra Dukhanina ===
Born in 1993. A student at the Moscow State university School of Translation and Interpretation, specializing in German. She was detained on May 27 and was placed under house arrest. She was accused of participating in mass riots (paragraph 2, article 212 of the Russian Criminal Code) and using force against a representative of the authorities (paragraph 1, article 318 of the Russian Criminal Code). She faced up to thirteen years in prison. She was accused of throwing pieces of asphalt at the Special Unit policemen. An injured party suffered skin reddening and physical pain. Alexandra Dukhanina was placed under house arrest until November 24, 2013. She was sentenced to 3 years and 3 months of suspended sentence.

=== Aleksey Gaskarov ===
Born in 1985, a prominent anti-fascist activist. In 2010 he was arrested and charged with assaulting the mayor of the town of Khimki, but cleared of all charges. Arrested on April 28, 2013 following his participation in the demonstrations on May 6, 2012. He was remanded until October 6. He was sentenced to 3 years and 6 months in prison.

=== Ilya Guschin ===
Born in 1988. An activist of the National Democratic Party. Arrested on February 6. The Investigative Committee of Russia claimed Ilya Guschin had grabbed a police officer by his uniform, trying to prevent the arrest of another protester.

In his testimony Ilya, confessed to having offered resistance to the police forces as he stood in a live chain along with other protesters. "They said that the rally had been cancelled, and I could not understand why. The police forces starting beating people, and I attempted to defend one man whom they attacked. I grabbed a police officer by his helmet, wanted to prevent him from hurting that man, I felt like this was my duty to try to do something. I tried to pull the policeman back, I realized that I could possibly hurt him and I did not want this, but the officer turned around and raised his truncheon at me. I disappeared into the crowd. I had done nothing more that could have been illegal or criminal", Ilya is quoted as saying.

According to media reports, Guschin is a Moscow Institute of Psychology and Education graduate who had spent three years working as an analyst for the Moscow Football Club . "Ilya was an ardent football fan, just a regular chap who trusted people. So long as he was part of the club everything was alright, because there were senior members there and they sort of looked after the younger ones. But then the club was closed down, and we lost sight of him. He went to work elsewhere, and our guys lost touch with him. But one thing was always there – he was invariably civic-minded . And that is none of his fault that the authorities had decided to stage a provocation on that day. Nor can he be blamed for his failure to remain just a bystander when he saw that the police were beating people", Motin wrote.

Ilya Guschin was remanded until October 6, 2013. He was sentenced to 2 years and 6 months in prison.

=== Alexandr Kamensky ===
Born in 1977. An activist with "The Other Russia". He was detained on the Teatralnaya square on May 6. He was arrested on June 10, but no charges were brought within 10 following days, so he was released. He was amnestied in December 2013.

=== Nikolay Kavkazsky ===
Born in 1986. A lawyer, a human rights activist and a member of opposition. He was arrested on July 25 and kept in the pre-trial detention prison No. 2. He was accused of participating in mass riots (paragraph 2, article 212 of the Russian Criminal Code) and faced up to eight years in prison. According to the accusation, he hit a policeman. An independent investigation undertaken by a journalist from the "Grani.ru" human rights organization implies that Nikolay was not beating the policeman but was rather dodging the blows.

Nikolay Kavkazsky suffers from multiple diseases such as rheumatoid arthritis, headaches, scoliosis, respiratory failure, heart disease, gastritis, allergy, dermatitis. His lawyers Tamara Romanova and Sergey Minnenkov have repeatedly drawn the attention of the court to Nikolay Kavkazsky's health conditions while presenting his medical records. He also complained about his health condition deteriorating in prison himself.

In prison, Nikolay Kavkazsky wrote the article "What can we do about the prisons?"

Nikolay Kavkazsky's filed an appeal to the Presidium of the Moscow City court and his detention was changed to house arrest on August 2, 2013, more than a year after he was arrested. He was under house arrest until November, 24th, 2013. He was amnestied in December 2013.

=== Elena Kokhtaryeva ===
Born in 1955. She was accused of throwing various objects at policemen and using force against them during the demonstrations. She was interrogated on March 25 and later placed under pledge not to leave the city. She was sentenced to 3 years and 7 months with a suspended sentence.

=== Mikhail Kosenko ===
Mikhail Kosenko was born in 1975. He has a registered 2-degree disability due to a psychiatric disease caused by an injury suffered in the army. He is accused of participating in the mass riots (paragraph 2, article 212 of the Russian Criminal Code) and using force dangerous for life and health against a representative of the authorities (paragraph 2, article 318 of the Russian Criminal Code - the only one accused of committing this crime). He faced up to eighteen years in prison. He was accused of hitting a policeman at least once with his hand and with his foot. He was arrested on June 8 and he kept in the psychiatric ward of the prison hospital in the pre-trial detention prison No. 2.

More than ten years before his arrest, Mikhail Kosenko was recognized as a disabled person. All of his family and friends view him as an adequate person who does not pose any threat to the society. Previously Mikhail used to take special medication on a regular basis. However, in prison access to the necessary medication was limited.

The psychiatric assessment conducted by the specialists with the Serbsky Institute initiated by the investigators concluded that he was of diminished responsibility. Experts with the Independent psychiatric association of Russia analyzed the results and deemed them to be dubious. The May 6th committee asked the International psychiatric association to conduct an independent assessment of Mikhail Kosenko's condition. People signed a petition on the Internet. On November 9, the trial of Mikhail Kosenko began. The prosecution and the court sent him to a psychiatric clinic for mandatory treatment for an indefinite time.

=== Leonid Kovyazin ===
Born in 1986. An actor and a journalist. The only accused who lived in a different city than Moscow (namely in Kirov). He was arrested in Kirov on September 5 and transferred to Moscow. He was kept in the pretrial detention prison No. 4. Leonid Kovyazin was accused of participating in mass riots (paragraph 2, article 212 of the Russian Criminal Code) and faced up to eight years in prison. He was accused of turning six toilet boxes upside down. He admitted to have helped to move them (the photos and the video show only three of them). He explained that he wanted to protect people from the Special Unit policemen. He does not recognize himself a participant of mass riots.

His lawyer Ruslan Chanidze presented the court several letters of guarantee from different Kirov culture figures. The chief editor of the newspaper that Kovyazin worked at repeatedly offered to put up a bail of 750 000 roubles. At the November 28 court session the defense presented numerous letters from journalists and editors from different media.

Leonid Kovyazin was remanded until November 24, 2013. He was amnestied in December 2013.

=== Sergey Krivov ===
Born in 1961, married, he had two underage children and also his disabled mother in his charge. A civic activist, a member of the RPR-Parnas. Before the arrest he repeatedly spoke out in favor of the May 6th prisoners.

He was arrested on October 18 and kept in the pretrial detention prison No. 1. He was accused of participating in mass riots (paragraph 2, article 212 of the Russian Criminal Code) and of using force against a representative of the authorities (paragraph 1, article 318 of the Russian Criminal Code). He faced up to thirteen years in prison. He was also accused that he snatched a club from a policeman and hit the policeman with it. The injury suffered by the policeman was a bruise at the back of his hand. Sergey Krivov viewed himself as innocent.

After the December 14 court session when he was remanded until March 6 Krivov declared a hunger strike demanding to be released.

He was remanded until November, 24th, 2013.

After completing a three-year, nine-month sentence, Krivov was released in July 2016.

=== Konstantin Lebedev ===
Born on June 25, 1979, is active in the Russian Socialist Movement. He was called in for interrogation following the Oct. 5, 2012 projection of the film "The Anatomy of the Protests" and arrested on Oct. 17. He was charged with the organization and preparation of riots, including the May 6 demonstration at Bolotnaya Square, and placed in preventive detention. On April 26, he was found guilty and sentenced to 2 years and 6 months in jail.

=== Denis Lutskevich ===
Born in 1992. A student and a former marine infantryman. On May 6 he was clubbed by the Special Unit policemen which is proven by the photos. He was arrested on June 9 and kept in the pre-trial detention prison No. 5. He was accused of participating in mass riots (paragraph 2, article 212 of the Russian Criminal Code) and using force against a representative of the authorities (paragraph 1, article 318 of the Russian Criminal Code). He faced up to thirteen years in prison. He was accused of snatching a helmet off a Special Unit policeman's head and throwing pieces of asphalt at them. The accusation is founded on the testimony provided by the injured party, Troerin.

The lawyer of Denis Lutskevich, Dmitry Dinze, presented the court with numerous positive references from his work, university and from his neighbors. Denis's mother offered to put up her apartment (worth more than 4 000 000 roubles) as bail.

Denis Lutskevich was remanded until November, 24th, 2013. He was sentenced to 3 years and 6 months in prison.

=== Maxim Luzyanin ===
Born in 1976. A businessman and a bodybuilder. He was arrested on May28th and kept at the pretrial detention prison No. 1. He was accused of participating in mass riots (paragraph 2, article 212 of the Russian Criminal Code) and of using force against a representative of the authorities (paragraph 1, article 318 of the Russian Criminal Code). He was accused of injuring Special Unit policemen, the most severe injury of which appears to be tooth enamel damage. He pleaded guilty to all the counts of the accusation and agreed to a special court procedure that allows not to prove guilt. The verdict was returned the same day, on November 9. He was sentenced to 4.5 years in a general regime prison. He was brutally tortured while in prison.

=== Alexander Margolin ===
Born in 1971. Alexander Margolin is a Moscow State University of Printing Arts graduate, who worked as the deputy director of the Mediacentre-ART Publishers. He was married, with two daughters. He was arrested on February 21. He was accused of violating paragraph 1 of article 318 of the Russian Criminal Code and paragraph 2 of article 212 of the Russian Criminal Code. Alexander had been taking part in protest events since December 2011 when he was arrested after the rally at Chistiye Prudi (Dec 5) and sentenced to spend 10 days in detention. He was not, however, detained after the May 6 rally on Bolotnaya Square. Later the investigators claimed to hold video recordings showing Margolin trying to knock down a police task force officer. No video recordings confirming this were provided. He was remanded until October 6. He was sentenced to 3 years and 6 months in prison.

=== Alexey Polikhovich ===
Born in 1990. A student and an employee of an insurance company, he also used to be a marine. He was arrested on July 26 and kept in the pretrial detention prison No. 2. He was accused of participating in mass riots (paragraph 2, article 212 of the Russian Criminal Code) and of using force against a representative of the authorities (paragraph 1, article 318). He faced up to thirteen years in prison. He was accused of trying to snatch a detained person from the hands of the Special Unit policemen and hitting one of them on a hand in the struggle. He was initially accused only of participating in mass riots. In December, 2012wa the policeman who had not previously provided this information said he had remembered that Aleksey Polikhovich hit him on the hand. Aleksey Polikhovich is remanded until November, 24th, 2013. He was sentenced to 3 years and 6 months in prison.

=== Leonid Razvozzhaev ===
Born in 1973, a businessman, and former president of the Retail and Service Workers' Union. He was married with two children, aged 8 and 16, and supported his elderly mother who lived in Siberia. Politically active since 1998, he was a member of the 'Left Front' and Assistant to Representative I. Ponomarev of the State Duma (Congress). On October 21 he was elected to the Coordinating Committee of the Opposition.

Leonid was called in for interrogation following the October 5, 2012 projection of the film "The Anatomy of the Protests". He left for Ukraine in order to request political asylum at the Kyiv office of the UN Human Rights Commission, but on Oct. 19 he was kidnapped near the UNHCR office and transported back to Russia. After two days of being tortured, he signed the confessions that he was asked to sign and which he formally renounced in court a few days later on October 25. He was charged with the organization and preparation of riots, including the May 6 demonstration at Bolotnaya Square, and placed in preventive detention. He was remanded until October 6, 2013. He was sentenced to 4 years and 6 months in prison.

=== Dmitry Rukavishnikov ===
Born in 1977. Charged pursuant to Part 2 of Article 212 of the Russian Criminal Code. He was kept under arrest. He was amnestied in December 2013.

=== Anastasia Rybachenko ===
Born in 1991, student of political science at the State Academic University for the Humanities in Moscow, an activist with the "Solidarnost" movement.

The home of her parents was searched in July 2012. Rybachenko, who was on a trip to France, the Netherlands and Germany at the time, decided not to return to Russia temporarily. Since Rybachenko’s travel visa was expiring, she planned to apply for asylum in Germany, but then changed her mind. In August 2012, Rybachenko enrolled in Tallinn University of Technology. The leaders of "Solidarnost" Garry Kasparov and Boris Nemtsov provided her with their personal letters of recommendation for her enrollment in the university.

In September 2013, the Investigative Committee of Russia made public that as of September 11, 2012, it accused Rybachenko of participating in mass riots (paragraph 2, article 212 of the Russian Criminal Code) though had kept it unknown for longer than a year. With regard to the situation, Estonian prime minister Andrus Ansip said that Rybachenko "should definitely submit an application to the corresponding institutions in Estonia. The most advisable would be to apply for asylum." In response, Rybachenko published an open letter to PM Ansip and stated that she appreciated the concern but did not need asylum as long as she had a student visa to stay in the EU. In the letter, Rybachenko also noted that her case was recognized as politically motivated in Europe, particularly by the European Parliament (resolutions 2013/2667(RSP) and 2014/2628(RSP)), Amnesty International and the European Court of Human Rights.

On January 9, 2014, before the investigation was completed, the case against Rybachenko was closed due to the amnesty issued by Russian president Vladimir Putin. Rybachenko's lawyer was Vladimir Samokhin.

=== Artem Savelov ===
Born in 1979. On May 6, he went to a demonstration for the very first time and happened to be at the point of cordon break. He was detained, according to the police report, he was shouting out such slogans as "Down with the police state!" and so forth. According to his friends and other people that talked to him, he stutters severely and he can't pronounce a phrase that long.

He was arrested on June 9, he is kept in the pretrial detention prison No. 4. He is accused of participating in mass riots (paragraph 2, article 212 of the Russian Criminal Code) and of allegedly using force against a representative of the authorities (paragraph 1, article 318 of the Russian Criminal Code). He is facing up to thirteen years in prison. He was accused of grasping a policeman by hand and trying to draw him into the aggressive crowd. The lawyer Farid Murtazin claims that Savelov suffers from some heart problems and that he needs a medical consultation which is impossible in prison conditions. Artem Savelov's father offered to put to 540 000 roubles as bail.

Artem Savelov is remanded until November, 24th. He was sentenced to 2 years and 7 months in prison.

=== Rikhard Sobolev ===
Born in 1990. An electrician. He was detained on the Teatralnaya square on May 6, which is proven by the court documents. He was arrested on June 10. He is accused of participating in mass riots (paragraph 2, article 212 of the Russian Criminal Code). He is facing up to eight years in prison. On August 9 he was released under pledge not to leave the city. He was amnestied in December 2013.

=== Stepan Zimin ===
Born in 1992. A student of the Russian State University for the Humanities, an anarchist. Arrested on June 8, he is kept in the pre-trial detention prison No. 5. He is accused of participating in mass riots (paragraph 1, article 212 of the Russian Criminal Code) and of using force against a representative of the authorities (paragraph 1, article 318 of the Russian Criminal Code). He is facing up to thirteen years in prison. He was accused of throwing a piece of asphalt at a Special Unit policeman and broke his finger. Medical experts concluded that the finger could not have been broken in that way since the injury were more likely to be a result twisting.

On November 27 the students of the RGHU organized a picket in support of Stepan Zimin.

He was remanded until November 24, 2013. He was sentenced to 3 years and 6 months in prison.

== Sentences ==
On November 9, Maxim Luzyanin was sentenced to 4.5 years of common regime prison by the Zamoskvoretsky court in Moscow.

On 24 February 2014 the following Bolotnaya case defendants received prison sentences:

- Sergey Krivov - four years;
- Andrey Barabanov - three years and seven months;
- Stepan Zimin - three years and six months;
- Denis Lutskevich - three years and six months;
- Alexey Polikhovich - three years and six months;
- Artem Savelov - two years and seven months;
- Yaroslav Belousov - two years and six months;
- Alexandra Dukhanina - a suspended sentence.

On 18 August 2014 the sentences were announced for:

- Aleksey Gaskarov - three years and six months;
- Ilya Goushchin - two years five months;
- Alexander Margolin - three years and six months;
- Elena Kohtareva - a conditional term of three years and seven months.

On 24 July 2014 the sentences were announced for:

- Sergei Udaltsov - four years and six months;
- Leonid Razvozzhaeva - four years and six months.

Up to 60 activists were accused in delinquency, fined and had a record in secret police file as disloyal.

There were mass protests around the court building when the sentences were announced, followed by arrests of the participants.

== Activists in exile ==
Several Russian activists have left their country for fear of prosecution and have sought refugee status in Ukraine. As of late July 2013 these appeals have all been denied by Ukrainian migration authorities. The activists then were granted asylum in Estonia, Finland, Germany, Lithuania, Portugal, Spain and Sweden.

== See also ==
- 2011–2013 Russian protests
