= Prima (news agency) =

Prima (also: The Moscow Human Rights News Agency) was a news agency in Moscow, Russia which distributed human rights-related news in both English and Russian. It had been in form of newspaper in Moscow since 1987 but was founded as an agency in February 2000 and had a website. Editor-in-chief of Prima information agency was Alexander Podrabinek.
