= Psikhushka =

Russian ironic diminutive for psychiatric hospital

Psikhushka (Russian: психу́шка; [pʲsʲɪˈxuʂkə]) is a Russian ironic diminutive for psychiatric hospital. In Russia, the word entered everyday vocabulary. This word has been occasionally used in English, since the Soviet dissident movement and diaspora community in the West used the term. In the Soviet Union, psychiatric hospitals were often used by the authorities as prisons, in order to isolate political prisoners from the rest of society, discredit their ideas, and break them physically and mentally. As such, psikhushkas were considered a form of torture. The official explanation was that no sane person would be against socialism.

Psikhushkas were already in use by the end of the 1940s (see Alexander Esenin-Volpin), continuing into the Khrushchev Thaw period of the 1960s. On April 29, 1969, the head of the KGB, Yuri Andropov submitted to the Central Committee of CPSU a plan for the creation of a network of specialized "psychiatric hospitals" run by the KGB.

The official Soviet psychiatric science came up with the definition of sluggish schizophrenia, a special form of the illness that supposedly affects only the person's social behavior, with no trace on other traits: "most frequently, ideas about a struggle for truth and justice are formed by personalities with a paranoid structure," according to the Moscow Serbsky Institute professors (a quote from Vladimir Bukovsky's archives). Some of them had high rank in the MVD, such as the infamous Daniil Luntz, who was characterized by Viktor Nekipelov as "no better than the criminal doctors who performed inhuman experiments on the prisoners in Nazi concentration camps".

The sane individuals who were diagnosed as mentally ill were sent either to regular psychiatric hospitals or, if deemed particularly dangerous, to special ones run directly by the MVD. The treatment included various forms of restraint, electric shocks, a range of drugs (such as narcotics, tranquilizers, and insulin) that cause long-lasting side effects, and sometimes involved beatings. Nekipelov describes inhumane uses of medical procedures such as lumbar punctures.

Notable political prisoners of psikhushkas include poet Joseph Brodsky, dissidents Leonid Plyushch, Vladimir Bukovsky, Natalya Gorbanevskaya, Alexander Esenin-Volpin, Pyotr Grigorenko, Zhores Medvedev, Viktor Nekipelov, Valeriya Novodvorskaya, Natan Sharansky, Andrei Sinyavsky, and Anatoly Koryagin, politician Konstantin Päts, and whistle blower Larisa Arap.

== Bibliography ==
- Antébi, Elizabeth (1977). Droit d'asiles en Union Soviétique. Paris: Julliard. ISBN 978-2260000655.
- Applebaum, Anne (2003). Gulag: A History. New York: Doubleday. ISBN 978-0-7679-0056-0.
- Boulet, Marc (2001). Dans la peau d'un... Paris: Seuil. ISBN 978-2-02-038072-0.
- Fireside, Harvey (1979). Soviet Psychoprisons. Norton. ISBN 9780393012668.
