= Nezavisimiy Psikhiatricheskiy Zhurnal =

- Discipline: Psychiatry
- Language: Russian
- Edited by: Yuri Savenko

Publication details
- History: 1991–present
- Publisher: Independent Psychiatric Association of Russia (Russian Federation)
- Frequency: Quarterly

Standard abbreviations
- ISO 4: Nezavis. Psikhiatr. Zh.

Indexing
- ISSN: 1028-8554
- OCLC no.: 224673640

Links
- Journal homepage; Online access; Online archives

Nezavisimiy Psikhiatricheskiy Zhurnal (Russian: Незави́симый психиатри́ческий журна́л, romanized: The Independent Psychiatric Journal) is a Russian peer-reviewed scientific journal which covers clinical practice, issues of modern psychiatry, and results of studies by Russian and foreign psychiatrists. The journal is the official publication of the Independent Psychiatric Association of Russia.

The Higher Attestation Commission of the Ministry of Education and Science of the Russian Federation has included Nezavisimiy Psikhiatricheskiy Zhurnal in the list of leading journals and publications.

The editor-in-chief is Yuri Savenko. Lyubov Vinogradova, a member of the journal's editorial board, works as editorial consultant of the Russian version of the journal World Psychiatry as well.

The journal is intended for doctors, psychologists, and lawyers, but also publishes materials interesting for lay persons and republishes works by Russian and Western doctors and philosophers which turned out to be inaccessible for a number of reasons.

There is open access to most issues of the journal.

In recent years, the journal publishes papers that force restrictions on patients' rights.

== See also ==
- List of psychiatry journals
