= Alexander Gabyshev =

Yakut shaman and activist (1968-)

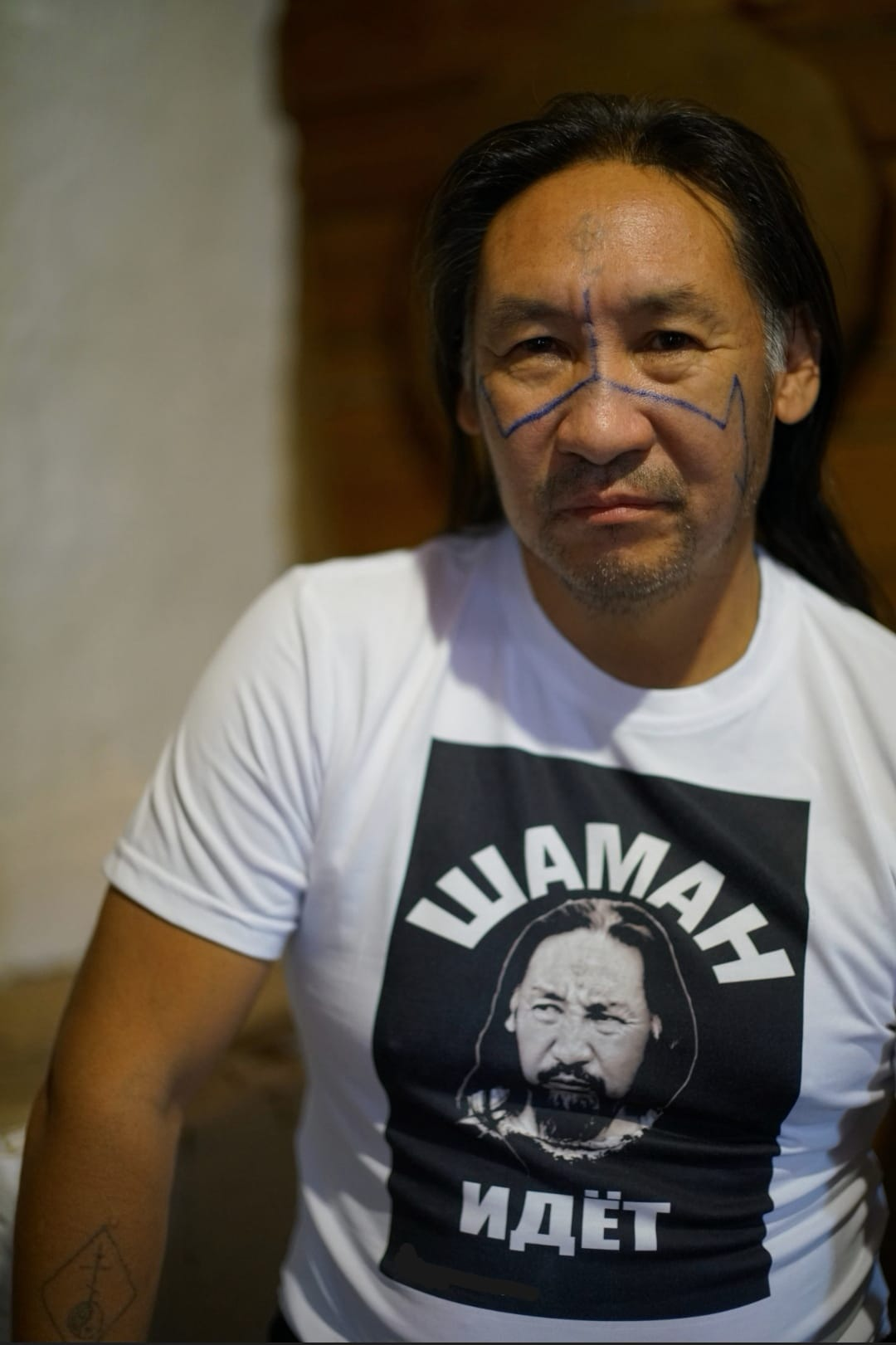
Gabyshev in 2021

Alexander Prokopievich Gabyshev (Russian: Александр Прокопьевич Габышев; Yakut: Ойуун Һааска, romanized: Oyuun Haaska; born 22 November 1968) is a Yakut shaman and anti-Putin political dissident. After being arrested and sentenced to involuntary confinement in a psychiatric hospital multiple times, his case has sparked condemnation of the political abuse of psychiatry in Russia.

== Biography ==
Gabyshev says he graduated from Yakutsk State University with a major in history. After a series of failed short-term jobs, and following the death of his mother, he suffered from poor mental health. It was at this time that Gabyshev decided to move and live in the forest, and later become a shaman.

He first thought of trekking from the republic of Sakha in far-eastern Russia to Moscow in 2018. Although locals claim no political goals at this time, Gabyshev later said that his purpose was to protest against the Russian president, Vladimir Putin. Sakha is roughly 8000 km away from Moscow. However, this event had to be cut short as his dog was hit by a car while they were walking along a road. In March 2019, he started his second march from Sakha to Moscow, where he planned to perform a ritual to cause Putin to resign, stating that he wished to "drive the evil spirit of Putin from the Kremlin". Along the way, he released a number of short video blogs about his march and his conversations with passing drivers.

In July 2019, he held a rally calling for Putin to "Return the Town and Country to the People" in Chita, Zabaykalsky Krai, which attracted between 700 and 1000 supporters and was organised by the local Communist Party.

In September 2019, after having attracted a small group of followers on the march, a group of pro-Putin shamans in the city of Ulan-Ude in Buryatia confronted him, arguing that shamans "do not care about politics. We need harmony. We do not need a bloody war". In September, in the same city, several of his followers were arrested and two cars used by the group were confiscated. A protest against the arrests was violently broken up by police on 9 September. On 19 September, masked police surrounded his camp and arrested him, taking to an unknown location. Russian media reported that he would be deported back to Yakutsk and was potentially facing charges of forming an extremist organisation. Amnesty International condemned the arrest, stating that "his detention is arbitrary and may amount to an enforced disappearance." On 20 September, Gabyshev was sent to a mental hospital by the region's health ministry.

In December 2019, he was arrested again after attempting to restart his march.

In February 2020, he announced that he would be filing a complaint with the European Court of Human Rights over his detention. In July 2020, he released a statement on social media saying that he would stop protesting against Putin, wanting to focus instead on getting his health in order.

On 9 January 2021, he posted a clip on YouTube where he stated he planned to march towards Moscow on horseback in March. Later that month, 50 police officers broke down his front door and arrested him again, placing him back under involuntary confinement in a mental hospital on the pretext that he had missed a monthly check-up meeting. After the arrest, police announced that they would be charging him for violence against police officers, stating that he had torn a riot officer's uniform and wounded the officer with a batas, a traditional Yakut long sword.

In July 2021, the Yakutsk City Court announced a ruling that Gabyshev should be confined indefinitely to a psychiatric hospital for intensive treatment. On 23 September, after losing an appeal, the ruling entered into effect. Amnesty International condemned the ruling, stating that he was "sentenced to indefinite compulsory psychiatric treatment solely for peacefully exercising his right to freedom of expression" and calling for an end to "punitive psychiatry as a method to silence dissent."
