= Transinstitutionalisation =

Inmates moving between institutions

Transinstitutionalisation is the phenomenon where inmates released from one therapeutic community move into other institutions, either as planned move or as an unforeseen consequence. For instance, when the residential mental hospitals in the United States were closed as the result of a political policy change, the prison population increased by an equivalent number.

In the United States patients that would have formerly have been in psychiatric hospitals wound up in general hospitals and private nursing homes which then became a growth industry.

There is an over-representation of the mentally ill in corrective settings. There are 400,000 prison inmates with mental health problems, and 25–40% of the mentally ill will spend some time in prison.

== Background ==
In 1939, Lionel Penrose published a cross-sectional study from 18 European countries which included Scandinavia. He demonstrated that there was an inverse relationship between the number of mental hospital beds and the number of prisoners; and then a relationship between the number of mental hospital beds with the number of murders. He argued that by increasing the number of mental institution beds, a society could reduce serious crimes and imprisonment rates. This became known as Penrose's law.

The Canadian sociologist Erving Goffman is credited with popularising the concept of total institutions in his paper "On the Characteristics of Total Institutions", presented in April 1957 at the Walter Reed Institute's Symposium on Preventive and Social Psychiatry, though it was used earlier by Everett Hughes during the late-1940s seminar, "Work and Occupations".

The downsizing of the large psychiatric hospitals in the US and the UK started in the mid-1950s then occurred in most Western European countries during the 1970s. Whether called 'deinstitutionalisation' 'community-based' care, 'open' mental health services or 'decentralised' mental health services, and the total number of beds in these total psychiatric institutions has fallen dramatically.

== Deinstitutionalisation ==
Deinstitutionalisation, the contraction of traditional institutional settings and especially a decline in the number of beds, is a process that takes several decades. Deinstitutionalisation comprises three processes: firstly a shift away from dependence on psychiatric hospitals; then 'transinstitutionalisation' or an increase in the number of mental health beds in general hospitals and nursing homes and finally the growth of community-based inpatient and outpatient services.

It has been conjectured that patients, who lost their homes during the deinstitutionalisation from the large hospitals failed to make the change to independent community living, and self-transinstitutionalised into the criminal custodial system. Transinstitutionalisation is the process that explains Penrose's law.
