= Alexander Podrabinek =

Soviet-Russian human rights activist and journalist

- Александр Подрабинек
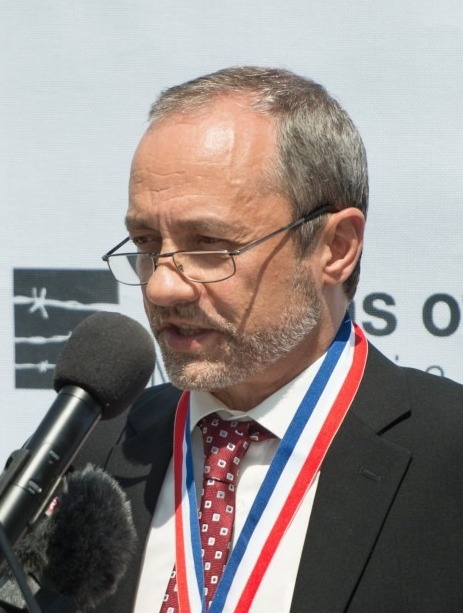
- Podrabinek in 2015
- Born: 8 August 1953 (age 73); Elektrostal, Moscow Region, Soviet Union
- Citizenship: Soviet Union (1953–1991) → Russian Federation (1991–present)
- Education: I.M. Sechenov First Moscow State Medical University
- Occupations: paramedic, human right activist, journalist, writer
- Known for: human rights activism in USSR in the Working Commission to Investigate the Use of Psychiatry for Political Purposes and struggle against political abuse of psychiatry in the Soviet Union; the post-1991 founding of the Independent Psychiatric Association of Russia
- Notable work: Punitive Medicine (1979), Dissidents (2014)
- Movement: dissident movement in the Soviet Union, Solidarnost
- Spouse: Alla
- Children: sons Mark and Daniil, daughter Anna
- Awards: Znamya magazine award 2013, Truman-Reagan Medal of Freedom, 2015

Alexander Pinkhosovich Podrabinek (Russian: Алекса́ндр Пи́нхосович Подраби́нек; born 8 August 1953) is a Soviet dissident, journalist and commentator. During the Soviet period he was a human rights activist, being exiled, then imprisoned in a corrective-labour colony, for publication of his book Punitive Medicine in Russian and in English.

In 1987, while still forced to live outside Moscow in internal banishment, Podrabinek became the founder and editor-in-chief of the Express Chronicle weekly newspaper. In the 1990s he set up and ran the Prima information agency. Over the past ten years he has worked, variously, for the Novaya gazeta newspaper, the Yezhednevny Zhurnal website and the Russian Services of Radio France Internationale and Radio Liberty.

== Biography ==
Alexander Podrabinek was born on 8 August 1953 in Elektrostal, a large provincial town in the Moscow Region to which his parents moved from Moscow in the early 1950s, to avoid the campaign against rootless cosmopolitans, i.e. Jews.

He and his younger brother Kirill were brought up there by their Jewish father Pinkhos after his Russian wife died. At secondary school, aged ten, they joined the Young Pioneers, but later Alexander and Kirill did not apply to join the Komsomol, the only two non-members in their respective classes: the only explanation the school administration could find was that they were either Baptists or open enemies of the regime.

Alexander enrolled in the Department of Pharmacology of a medical institute in 1970 and worked as an assistant in a biology laboratory at Moscow State University of Medicine and Dentistry. From 1971 to 1974 Alexander studied at a college for medical auxiliary staff and received certification as a paramedic. He went on to work in the Moscow ambulance service.

== Dissent under Brezhnev and Gorbachev ==
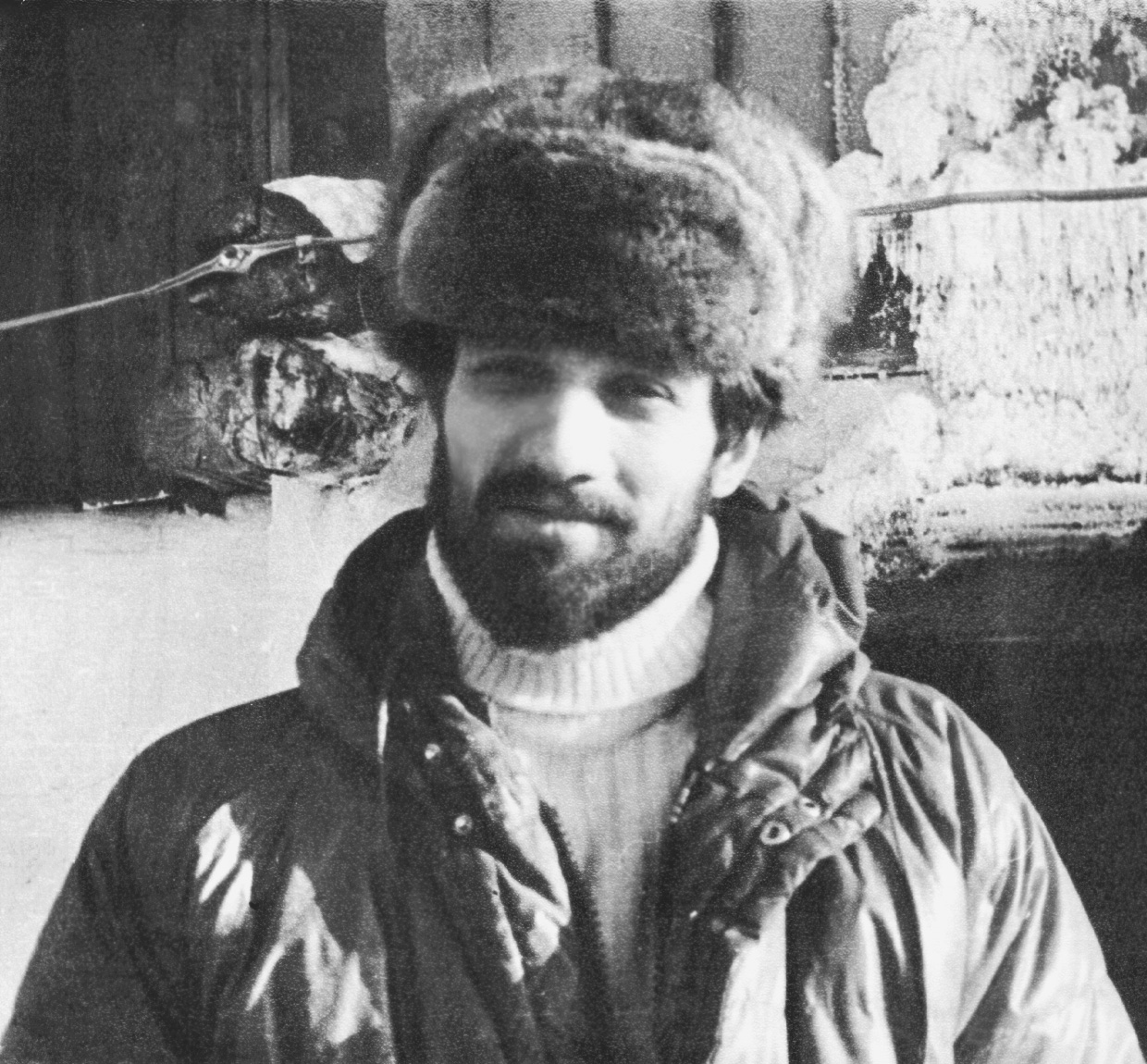
Podrabinek in Ust-Nera, 1980

For political reasons, Podrabinek was denied entrance to medical school, and, at the age of 20, began working for the ambulance service instead. At an early age, Podrabinek became acquainted with dissident circles in Moscow and began to take part in their activities. (His medical father, himself the son of an "Enemy of the People" shot in 1937, did not discourage him.)

After reading the notes that dissident poet Vladimir Gershuni's smuggled out of the Oryol Special Psychiatric hospital, Alexander became interested in the political abuse of psychiatry in the USSR. Soon he was a contributing editor to the Chronicle of Current Events (1968-1982), covering psychiatric issues.

In January 1977, he also travelled to Siberia as a courier for the Relief (Solzhenitsyn) Fund, delivering money to the needy families of political prisoners, held in the camps or forced to live in exile.

=== Punitive Psychiatry ===
On 5 January 1977, Podrabinek launched the Working Commission to Investigate the Use of Psychiatry for Political Purposes. The Commission at first had three other members (Vyacheslav Bakhmin, Irina Kaplun and Felix Serebrov), and its consultant psychiatrist was A.A. Voloshanovich. Around the Commission formed a circle of supporters "without whom we could have done nothing," comments Podrabinek. "The volume of work was too great.". They visited psychiatric hospitals, wrote appeals to hospital doctors, and published information on psychiatric abuse in their own information bulletins, and in other samizdat publications like the Chronicle of Current Events.

In 1977, Podrabinek published Punitive Medicine [Карательная медицина], the Russian edition of his book on the systematic abuse of psychiatry for political purposes in the USSR. In December 1977, the KGB approached Podrabinek's father Pinkhos, and threatened to arrest and imprison both his sons (Kirill was suffering from TB) if the three of them did not agree to emigrate to Israel. (In an essay circulated in samizdat Kirill had criticized the treatment of conscripts in the Soviet army.) They discussed their predicament with other dissidents, notably Tatyana Velikanova, at the apartment of Andrei Sakharov. Sakharov's wife, Yelena Bonner, urged the three to take the opportunity to leave the USSR. Alexander, supported by Velikanova, rejected the proposal and later held a press conference at the home of Andrei Sakharov, publicly asserting his refusal to given in to such blackmail.

On 15 August 1978, Alexander Podrabinek was convicted of "anti-Soviet slander", sentenced to five years' banishment or internal exile, and was first transported to the Irkutsk Region, Siberia. (His brother Kirill, meanwhile, was convicted of possessing an offensive weapon and was sent to a camp for ordinary criminals.) After the English edition of Punitive Medicine appeared, Podrabinek was again charged with political offences — he was by then exiled to Yakutia in the Soviet Far East — and at his trial in Ust-Nera on 6 January 1981, he was sentenced to three years in a local corrective-labour camp.

=== Return from the Far East ===
In autumn 1986, prompted by Anatoly Marchenko's hunger strike in Chistopol Prison, Podrabinek, veteran dissident Larisa Bogoraz, and lawyer Sophia Kalistratova launched a campaign for the release of the Soviet Union's hundreds of political prisoners.

They sent letters requesting a wide amnesty to the presidium of the USSR Supreme Soviet and to Mikhail Gorbachev, the new leader of the Soviet Communist Party. There was no response.

Then they began sending their two letters to prominent members of the artistic and technical intelligentsia: to writers, poets and artists; and to scientists and scholars. The result was disheartening. With notable exceptions, e.g. the world-famous animé artist Yury Norstein, very few would put their name to such a document.

In 1987, Podrabinek founded the weekly samizdat newspaper Express Chronicle, which appeared in Russian and English between 1987 and 2000. As the first uncensored media outlet in the USSR, with the Glasnost journal of Sergei Grigoryants, the Chronicle drew the interest of Western journalists in Moscow . The Chronicle circulated in a hundred major Soviet cities.

In March 1989, Alexander participated in the founding of the Independent Psychiatric Association of Russia.

== Career as a journalist ==
Podrabinek started working as a journalist during the Gorbachev years. From 1987 to 2000 he was editor-in-chief of the weekly human right magazine Express Chronicle («Экспресс Хроника»). In 2000, he became editor-in-chief of the Prima information agency, which specialized in human right issues.

In 2004, Alexander Podrabinek became involved in the distribution of Blowing up Russia: Terror from within, the exposé written by Alexander Litvinenko and Yuri Felshtinsky. Unable to find a publisher in Russia, the authors printed an early draft in Latvia, intending to distribute it in Moscow. On 29 December 2003, however, units of the Russian Interior Ministry and the FSB seized 4,376 copies of the book purchased by Podrabinek's Prima information agency. The books had passed customs and were being driven by truck from Latvia to Moscow to be sold there. Podrabinek was summoned by the FSB for questioning on 28 January 2004, but he refused to answer their questions.

In certain articles for Novaya gazeta, and comments on Radio Liberty, Podrabinek expressed concern that the use of psychiatry for political repression was reviving in Russia, in the enforced hospitalization of Larisa Arap, for instance.

In 2009, Podrabinek was targeted by the nationalist youth movement Nashi after writing on the Yezhednevny Zhurnal website about a Moscow eating place opposite the "Soviet" Hotel which had renamed itself the "Anti-Soviet" Restaurant and put up a sign using its popular nickname. Local officials said the title was offensive to "Soviet veterans and should be removed." (In early 2014 new legislation enabled the Communications Oversight Agency (or Rozkomnadzor) to block the Yezhednevny Zhurnal and Kasparov.ru websites.)

Since 2014, Podrabinek has been host of the "Déjà vu" programme on Radio Liberty and his articles have been published by the Institute of Modern Russia.

== Activism ==
Podrabinek has been interviewed, talking about his past as a Soviet dissident, in two documentaries: They Chose Freedom (2005) and Parallels, Events, People (2013). His contributions, past and present, were acknowledged in 2015 by the award of the Truman-Reagan Medal of Freedom.

Podrabinek remains active and vocal as an opposition figure today.

In March 2006 Podrabinek was briefly arrested in Minsk for involvement in peaceful protests against the re-election of the Belarusian president Alexander Lukashenko for the third term.

In 2008 he supported the campaign to gain the admission of Vladimir Bukovsky to the presidential elections. On 3 June 2008, he became a founding signatory of the Prague Declaration on European Conscience and Communism.

In March 2010 Alexander Podrabinek signed the online anti-Putin manifesto of the Russian opposition "Putin must go".

On 25 September 2013, he held a protest in support of imprisoned Nadezhda Tolokonnikova of Pussy Riot band.

On 4 May 2016, Podrabinek published An Open Letter to the Prosecutor of Crimea.

In October 2017 Podrabinek drafted and launched a petition, calling on Russia's citizens not to support the hypocrisy of the Russian authorities who, on the one hand, unveiled the massive Wall of Sorrow a monument in Moscow to the victims of political repression, and, on the other, were responsible for the re-appearance of prisoners of conscience and political prisoners in post-Soviet Russia. The petition was signed by many former Soviet dissidents from Russia, Ukraine, Estonia, Armenia, Georgia, the USA and France.

== Works ==
=== Books ===
- Nekipelov, Viktor & Podrabinek Alexander (1977). Из жёлтого безмолвия: Сборник воспоминаний и статей политзаключенных психиатрических больниц [From yellow silence: the collection of memoirs and articles by political prisoners of psychiatric hospitals] (in Russian). Moscow.
- Podrabinek, Alexander (1980). Punitive medicine. Ann Arbor: Karoma Publishers. ISBN 978-0-89720-022-6. Russian text: Podrabinek, Alexander [Александр Подрабинек] (1979). Карательная медицина [Punitive medicine] (PDF) (in Russian). New York: Издательство "Хроника" [Khronika Press]. Archived from the original on 22 June 2016.
- Подрабинек, Александр (2014). Диссиденты [Dissidents] (in Russian). Moscow: АСТ. ISBN 978-5-17-082401-4.

=== Articles ===
(in English, French and Russian)

- Podrabinek, Alexandre; Mathon, Tania (June 1981). "Déclaration finale" [Final declaration]. Esprit (in French). 54 (6): 127–145. JSTOR 24268683.
- Podrabinek, Alexander (1990). "Does the Soviet press have a future?". Index on Censorship. 19 (8): 2–3. doi:10.1080/03064229008534912. S2CID 146918831.
- Podrabinek, Alexandre (2009). "Liberté russe et tolérance européenne" [Russian liberty and European tolerance]. Revue Russe (in French). 33 (1): 17–23. doi:10.3406/russe.2009.2381.
- Александр Подрабинек (2014). Клеточников [Kletochnikov]. Zvezda (in Russian) (2).

== Interviews ==
- Строганова, Анна (10 June 2014). "Александр Подрабинек о своей книге "Диссиденты": "Все были готовы к тому, что их посадят"" [Alexander Podrabinek about his book Dissidents: "All were ready to be imprisoned"] (in Russian). Radio France Internationale.
- Подрабинек, Александр (11 February 2015). ""Надежду обрекли на смерть", — Александр Подрабинек о суде над летчицей Савченко" ["Nadezhda is doomed to death," — Alexander Podrabinek about the trial of woman-pilot Savchenko] (in Russian). Radio France Internationale.
- Подрабинек, Александр (17 February 2016). "Путин и судьи" [Putin and judges] (in Russian). Radio France Internationale.
- Александр Подрабинек в программе Александра Гранта "Контакт" (Alexander Podrabinek in Alexander Grant's program "Contact", in Russian, 56 min, 16 July 2015) on YouTube
- Встреча с А. Подрабинеком у Бориса Паланта (Meeting with A. Podrabinek in Boris Palant, in Russian, 99 min, 15 June 2015) on YouTube
- Александр Подрабинек // "В Нью-Йорке с Виктором Топаллером" (Alexander Podrabinek // "In New York with Viktor Topaller", in Russian, 53 min, 28 July 2015) on YouTube

== See also ==
- Working Commission to Investigate the Use of Psychiatry for Political Purposes (1977-1981)
- Political abuse of psychiatry in the Soviet Union
- Serbsky Institute

== External Sources ==
- A Chronicle of Current Events (Moscow), 1968-1982.
- «Вести из СССР» (Vesti iz SSSR, Munich), 1978-1987.
