= Independent Psychiatric Association of Russia =

Russian non-governmental professional organization

The Independent Psychiatric Association of Russia
- Независимая психиатрическая ассоциация России
- Formation: March 1989
- Type: Non-profit; NGO
- Purpose: human rights monitoring, struggle against political abuse of psychiatry in Russia
- Headquarters: Room 5a, doorway 3, building 4, Luchnikov lane, Moscow; Moscow, the Russian Federation
- Fields: psychiatry
- Members: about 600
- 1990–present President: Yuri Savenko, M.D.
- Publication: Nezavisimiy Psikhiatricheskiy Zhurnal
- Website: npar.ru

The Independent Psychiatric Association of Russia (IPA) (Russian: Незави́симая психиатри́ческая ассоциа́ция Росси́и) is the sole Russian non-governmental professional organization that makes non-forensic psychiatric expert examination at the request of citizens whose rights have been violated with the use of psychiatry. The IPA is not a state institution but a public organization, and its medical reports have not a legal but an ethical significance. There is nowhere to refute one's misdiagnosis in Russia. In recent years, the IPA forces restrictions on patients' rights and transinstitutionalization of those with mental illness.

== History ==
The IPA was established in Moscow in March 1989 and became the first psychiatric association in the USSR which was not controlled by the State. The IPA was created as an association publicly opposing itself to official Soviet psychiatry and its offspring, the All-Union Society of Neuropathologists and Psychiatrists, which was completely under the control of the Soviet government and implemented its political principles. The members of the initiative group on establishing the IPA were Alexandr Podrabinek and psychologist Victor Lanovoi who had developed the plan to establish the IPA and had been its first president before he emigrated to Israel. The IPA has been the full member of the World Psychiatric Association since October 17, 1989. In 1992, the IPA joined the Russian Human Rights House Network, a union of 10 well-known human rights organizations. The IPA played a significant part in the demolition of punitive psychiatry. The IPA appears to make very active efforts to communicate their views on the previous and present abuses of psychiatry in Russia to psychiatry in the West.

== Structure ==
In 2010, the IPA has about 600 members in 54 regions of Russia. Most members of the IPA are the members of the Russian Society of Psychiatrists. The charter of the IPA runs as follows: "Independent means self-supporting, no included in the composition and departmental subordination of state medical institutions and other administrative bodies." The IPA cooperates with the Moscow Helsinki Group and has the community liaison office and examination commission where one can receive free legal advice and services. The Society of Clinical Psychotherapists (M.Burno) was created under the auspices of IPA in 1995. Later on Moscow Group for Philosophy and Psychiatry (Elena B. Bezzubova) was organized and began to function together with psychotherapeutic theatre and regular meetings grouped under the title of "Psychiatry and Problems of Spiritual Life" (B.Voskresensky and Z.Krakhmalnikova). IPA takes an active part in the movement "Philosophy and Psychiatry," with Elena Bezzubova (University of California, Irvine) and Yuri Savenko being members of the Steering Committee of International Network for Philosophy and Psychiatry.

== The IPA leadership ==
The President of the IPA is Yuri Savenko, the Executive Director is Lyubov Vinogradova, the Chief of the legal service is Julia Argunova.

== Publication ==
The official publication of the IPA is Nezavisimiy Psikhiatricheskiy Zhurnal (Independent Psychiatric Journal). According to a resolution adopted on the 19 of February 2010 by the presidium of the State Commission for Academic Degrees and Titles of the Ministry of Education and Science of the Russian Federation, Nezavisimiy Psikhiatricheskiy Zhurnal has been included in the list of the leading peer-reviewed journals and publications.

== Estimations ==
Noted public figures and scientists expressed their appreciation for the IPA activities. In 2004, the President of the World Psychiatric Association Professor Ahmed Okasha wrote: "The World Psychiatric Association has strengthened due to the membership of your Society." Three years later, his successor as the WPA President, Professor Juan Mezzich, noted that the WPA representatives highly appreciated the IPA successes in clinical psychiatry as well as ethical and humanitarian aspirations demonstrated by the IPA despite many difficulties it had to face.

According to A.I. Appenyansky, the Chief Academic Secretary of the Russian Society of Psychiatrists (RSP), the RSP appreciates the IPA role in developing psychiatric care in the country. A.I. Appenyansky noted that the IPA became a very reputable professional public organization providing pluralism for professional discussion in psychiatry and that it was promoted due to, in particular, publishing very important and interesting periodical Nezavisimiy Psikhiatricheskiy Zhurnal as well as contributions of noted representatives of the psychiatric community such as Savenko, Vinogradova, Argunova, Gofman, Boukhanovsky, Piven, and others.

== Resisting the use of psychiatry against religious minorities ==
In 2006, Yuri Savenko stated that a first large relapse of the use of psychiatry for political purposes in post-Soviet Russia during recent decade was struggle against 'totalitarian sects.' According to Yuri Savenko, the reason for the use of psychiatry against religious minorities, which began from 1995, was professor Y.I. Polishchuk's report containing conclusion about 'gross harm on mental health' inflicted by different religious organizations. This report was distributed to all public prosecutors' offices of the country and the presidents of the educational institutions despite the fact that its scientific inadequacy was emphasized by not only the IPA, but the Russian Society of Psychiatrists since all imputed cases of illness, suicide, family breakdown, etc. proved to be much more frequent in the general population than in the persecuted religious organizations.

In 1999, the IPA expressed its concern about the facts of the use of psychiatry against religious minorities in the IPA Open Letter to the General Assembly of XI Congress of the WPA. Stressing all the responsibility taken by the authors of the letter for the action involved in their statement, they noted in it that they considered it necessary to draw the WPA General Assembly's attention to the recurrent use of psychiatry for non-medical purposes, which was recommenced in Russia from 1994–1995, was subsequently going on a large-scale without slackening and was aimed at suppressing not political dissenters but already religious dissenters. This letter was concluded with the proposal, which was addressed to the WPA, to adopt the text of statement containing words of the WPA's concern about initiating numerous lawsuits against various religious organizations in Russia for allegedly 'inflicting by them gross harm on mental health and for unhealthy changes of personality' and to express in the statement the WPA's solidarity with the position of the Independent Psychiatric Association of Russia and the Russian Society of Psychiatrists as to the inadmissibility of involving psychiatrists in issues straining their professional competence.

== IPA attitude to homosexuality ==
In 2005, Savenko as the president of the IPA expressed their joint surprise at the proposal by the Executive Committee of the American Psychiatric Association to exclude homosexuality as a mental disorder from manuals on psychiatry, referred the proposal to antipsychiatric actions, and stated that ideological, social and liberal reasoning for the proposal was substituted for scientific one. His statement was put in the following words: "It is surprising for us that the substitution of ideological, social and liberal reasoning for scientific one came not from Russia and that the Executive Committee of the APA unanimously proposed to exclude homosexuality as a mental disorder from manuals on psychiatry. It shows that even the well-developed legal framework for psychiatry and the denationalization of mental health service (by 80% in the USA), ie, the absence of two of the three factors that played a crucial role in Soviet abuses of psychiatry, does not protect against inherently antipsychiatric actions." In 2014, Savenko changed his mind about homosexuality, and he and Perekhov in their joint paper criticized and referred the trend to consider homosexuality as a mental disorder to Soviet mentality that has endured into the present day.

== Advocacy of eugenics ==
The president of the IPA, Yuri Savenko, justifies forced sterilization of women, which is practiced in Moscow psychoneurological nursing homes, and states that "one needs a more strictly adjusted and open control for the practice of preventive eugenics, which, in itself, is, in its turn, justifiable."

== Forcing restrictions on patients' rights ==
In 2012, the Independent Psychiatric Association published a paper by its former legal consultant, who in the paper proposed amendments to the Law on Fundamentals of Protection of Public Health in the Russian Federation to legalize involuntary dispensary supervision over persons with mental disorders without their informed consent and court judgment having been taken. Establishing the dispensary supervision over persons specified in part 1 of Article 27 of the Russian Mental Health Law always leads to legally meaningful consequences for them, such as restrictions on their right to performing specific types of professional occupation and that related to a source of an increased danger. In his other paper, the former legal consultant of the IPA insists that the right to daily walks should be added to the list of patients' rights that may be restricted on the recommendation of the attending doctor or the head doctor in the interests of health or safety of patients and others.

== Forcing transinstitutionalization ==
Lyubov Vinogradova of the IPA states that many regions have a catastrophic shortage of places in psychoneurological internats, her words point out the need to increase the number of places there and to the fact that the Independent Psychiatric Association of Russia is forcing transinstitutionalization—relocating the mentally ill from their homes and psychiatric hospitals to psychoneurological internats.

== Funding ==
In 2013 and 2014, the IPA has been working by using a grant from President of the Russian Federation.

== Reports ==
The organization cooperated with a number of other NGOs to compose a highly critical report about rising rates of mental disease and the deteriorating system of mental health care. In the report, authors blamed 'chronic underfunding of psychiatric care, corruption, and poverty' and pointed an accusing finger at the psychiatric leadership.

== Reference data ==
- Mercer, Ellen; Mesner, Lea (1993). An International psychiatric directory. American Psychiatric Pub. p. 184. ISBN 0-89042-248-6.
