= Yuri Savenko =

Russian psychiatrist

- Юрий Савенко
- Born: Soviet Union
- Citizenship: the Soviet Union (1946–1991); Russia (1991–present)
- Known for: Human rights activism
- Awards: Award of the Moscow Helsinki Group "for historic contribution to the defence of human rights and the human rights movement"
- Scientific career
- Fields: Psychiatry
- Institutions: the Independent Psychiatric Association of Russia

Yuri Sergeevich Savenko (Russian: Юрий Сергеевич Савенко) is a Russian psychiatrist, the president since 1989 of the Independent Psychiatric Association of Russia. He is also a member of the Council of Experts of the Russian Commissioner for Human Rights in the Russian Federation. He holds M.D. qualification and is editor-in-chief of and a regular contributor to the Nezavisimiy Psikhiatricheskiy Zhurnal, which has been published since 1991. He had been working as editorial consultant of the Moskovskiy Psikhoterapevticheskiy Zhurnal ("Moscow Journal for Psychotherapy") for many years before he left this position in 2008.

Before defending his doctoral thesis, Savenko was expelled from the Institute of Psychiatry in 1974.

His main works concern anxious psychotic syndromes, psychotic disorders problems, subject of psychiatry, and the classification of mental disorders.

Yuri Savenko took part in a 'wrongful confinement' lawsuit filed in the European Court of Human Rights in 2003. When writing about this case, Savenko charged the Serbsky Institute with having a "pernicious effect on Russian medicine" and warned that the leadership of the psychiatric community "is now completely under the shadow of the state."

On 28 May 2009, Yuri Savenko wrote to the President of the Russian Federation Dmitry Medvedev an open letter, in which Savenko asked Medvedev to submit to the State Duma a draft law prepared by the Independent Psychiatric Association of Russia to address a sharp drop in the level of forensic psychiatric examinations, which Savenko attributed to a lack of competition within the sector and its increasing nationalization.

In 2009, Yuri Savenko and Valery Krasnov provided the leadership for the Second East European Congress of Psychiatry in Moscow.

== Eugenic views ==
Savenko is a supporter of preventive eugenics, he justifies enforced sterilization of women, which is practiced in Moscow psychoneurological nursing homes, and states that

one needs a more strictly adjusted and open control over the practice of preventive eugenics, which, in itself, is, in its turn, justifiable.

However, Article 7 of Part 1 of the Rome Statute of the International Criminal Court defines enforced sterilization among crimes against humanity. In 2013, he seemed to take the opposite point of view and criticize German eugenics in the documentary Archetype. Neurosis. Libido. T-4 Death Squad produced by the Rossiya K TV channel.

== Attitude to homosexuality ==
In 2005, Savenko as the president of the IPA expressed their joint surprise at the proposal by the Executive Committee of the American Psychiatric Association to exclude homosexuality as a mental disorder from manuals on psychiatry, referred the proposal to antipsychiatric actions, and stated that ideological, social and liberal reasoning for the proposal was substituted for scientific one. His statement was put in the following words: "It is surprising for us that the substitution of ideological, social and liberal reasoning for scientific one came not from Russia and that the Executive Committee of the APA unanimously proposed to exclude homosexuality as a mental disorder from manuals on psychiatry. It shows that even the well-developed legal framework for psychiatry and the denationalization of mental health service (by 80% in the USA), ie, the absence of two of the three factors that played a crucial role in Soviet abuses of psychiatry, does not protect against inherently antipsychiatric actions". In 2014, Savenko changed his mind about homosexuality, and he and Perekhov in their joint paper criticized and referred the trend to consider homosexuality as a mental disorder to Soviet mentality that has endured into the present day.

== The resolution on Savenko ==
On 19 December 2013, the Commission on Professional Ethics Issues at the Board of the Russian Society of Psychiatrists delivered to Savenko when he raised ethical issues concerning the case of Mikhail Kosenko in publications, a resolution as follows:

Savenko Yu. S. in his public appearances has grossly violated the norms of professional ethics. In numerous declarations, appeals, appearances by Savenko Yu. S. in the media, there are noted impermissible, insulting, offensive statements, which derogate from honour, dignity and goodwill of both individual experts and the expert institution F[ederal] S[tate] B[udgetary] I[nstitution] "the Serbsky S[tate] S[cientific] C[enter for] S[ocial and] F[orensic] P[sychiatry]" and at the same time undermine the authority of the psychiatric community as a whole.

Savenko responded that the strikingly unethical nature of the resolution by the Ethical Commission (of 12 December 2013) showed in the ascription to the IPA open letter to the WPA, hosted on the website, of phrases that were never used there. He adds we see a rather awkward performance of a social role using the old scenario of accusatory campaigns of Soviet times to have the possibility to refer to "the opinion of the professional public" for use abroad.

== Awards ==
On 10 December 2013, Savenko received the award of the Moscow Helsinki Group "for historic contribution to the defence of human rights and the human rights movement".
