= Mental health in Russia =

Mental health in Russia is covered by a law, known under its official name—the Law of the Russian Federation "On Psychiatric Care and Guarantees of Citizens' Rights during Its Provision" (Russian: Зако́н Росси́йской Федера́ции «О психиатри́ческой по́мощи и гара́нтиях прав гра́ждан при её оказа́нии», Zakon Possiyskoy Federatsii "O psikhiatricheskoy pomoshchi i garantyakh prav grazhdan pri yeyo okazanii"), which is the basic legal act that regulates psychiatric care in the Russian Federation and applies not only to persons with mental disorders but all citizens. A notable exception of this rule is those vested with parliamentary or judicial immunity. Providing psychiatric care is regulated by a special law regarding guarantees of citizens' rights.

Due to this fact, it is acknowledged that functions of psychiatry are not limited to identifying and removing biological anomalies that cause "mental illnesses", caring for patients and alleviating their sufferings, but they also apply to the scope of their civil rights. The passage of the law was one of the five conditions for the membership of the All-Union Society of Psychiatrists and Neuropathologists in the World Psychiatric Association. The law passed on 2 July 1992 and received the number 3185-1.

== History ==
=== Revolutionary period ===
There was an increasingly decentralised approach to psychiatric care before 1917, with smaller hospitals (10 to 20 beds), more out-patient clinics, and some collaboration with private practice. Psychiatrists were expected to deal with general medical issues and problems relating to epidemic and infectious diseases, witness corporal punishment, and to attend executions. After the 1905 Russian Revolution there was an influx of political prisoners into asylums. Local zemstvos provided two-thirds of the funding for psychiatric services and the central government one third.

The Commissariat of Public Health established the Psychiatry Commission in October 1917. Psychiatrists were given greater control over hospitals. Psychiatric services were funded by central government. Support services for mentally ill soldiers were provided by the Russian Red Cross Society until they were taken over by the Commissariat of Public Health in 1919. They appointed a psychiatrist/neurologist consultant for the Red Army.

=== Soviet Union ===
During the period of the Soviet Union, it was not considered reasonable to pass special legislative acts protecting the material and legal part of the patients' mental health, thus leaving mental health services mainly inconsistent and unregulated. There were only guidelines of the legal and medical departments that stipulated certain rules of handling the mentally sick and imposing different sanctions on them. Two guidelines on the management of mentally ill persons were published in 1961 and 1971, respectively. These were prepared by lawyer Alexander Rudyakov, who was the legal adviser to the chief psychiatrist of the Moscow Oblast, and read that the grounds for urgent hospitalization was when an ill person was of social danger. Up until 1988, psychiatry in the USSR was not regulated by laws, there were only departmental guidelines, especially those of the USSR Ministry of Health, and one article in the Fundamentals of Health Legislation of the USSR. Vague wordings in the guidelines led to their wide and arbitrary application, which was fully in the hands of psychiatrists. In the absence of legal control over the actions of doctors, departmental regulation of mental health care has contributed to psychiatric abuse. Only in the beginning of 1988, the USSR adopted the Statute on Conditions and Procedures for the Provision of Psychiatric Assistance, which has been the first legal act in this field and has certainly played a positive role for Soviet psychiatry. However, the 1988 Statute did not fully protect the rights of citizens falling into the field of activity of psychiatry, did not fully protect the mentally ill, did not contain developed mechanisms for legal control over the actions of psychiatrists and did not conform to the USSR Constitution and international standards.

=== 1992 ===
In 1992, in Russia, the enactment of the law took place under dramatic circumstances, even with the consideration that there was an 80-year delay for any mental health legislation and given the fact that political abuse of psychiatry was unprecedentedly widespread and denied for two decades from 1968 to 1988. When Soviet rule was coming to an end, the decision to develop a law on mental health was made by senior officials and under the threat of economic sanctions from the United States. An initiator of creating a serious, detailed mental health law in the USSR was a deputy of the last convocation of the Supreme Soviet of the USSR, a young engineer from a Uralian town. When asked why he as an engineer needs it, he replied to Semyon Gluzman, "All this democracy will soon run out, guys who will come to power, will start repression, and you, Dr. Gluzman, and I will have a hard time. So let's at least get these guys blocked from this possibility and adopt a civilized law eliminating the possibility of psychiatric repression!" The Law was developed with the participation of psychiatrists involved in political abuse of psychiatry. At a meeting held by the Health Committee of the Supreme Soviet of the USSR in the autumn of 1991, the Law was approved, particularly in the speeches by the four members of the commission of the World Psychiatric Association, but this event was followed by the dissolution of the Soviet Union. As its result, the work on the draft of the Mental Health Law automatically ceased.

In 1992, a new commission was created under the Supreme Soviet of the Russian Federation and used a new concept of developing the Law; a quarter of the commission members were the representatives of the Independent Psychiatric Association of Russia (IPA). The main developer of the Law was Svetlana Polubinskaya of the Institute of State and Law of the Russian Academy of Sciences. Polubinskaya was the sole lawyer in the commission of psychiatrists for developing the Law and lodged a categorical protest against including other lawyers in the commission.

The Supreme Soviet of Russia passed the Law on 2 July 1992. The Law has been in force since 1 January 1993. For the first few years, the Law was defied, seen by the doctors as an undue burden and was not let known to the patients. In 1993, when the IPA printed the Law in 50 thousand copies for the general reader, quite a number of heads of the Moscow psychoneurologic dispensaries refused to circulate the Law. Over time, these difficulties were overcome. It became obligatory to know the Law to pass the certification exam.

== Overview ==
The Law contains 6 sections and 50 articles. Section I of the law describes general provisions of psychiatric care in Russia, covering items such as the right of persons with mental disorders, the voluntariness of seeking care/refusal of treatment, diagnostic and treatment procedures and ensuring that medical confidentiality is maintained in dealing with mentally ill patients. Section II covers the state provision of psychiatric care, including financial provision. Section III describes the rights and duties of mental health workers in Russia, as well as the authorised institutions that provide mental health services. Section IV details further into the types of psychiatric care and procedure of care, including the 'internment' process. Section V describes the role of law enforcement, while Section VI covers appeals against psychiatric care.

== Practical significance ==
Adoption of the Law On Psychiatric Care and Guarantees of Citizens' Rights during Its Provision is regarded as a notable event in the history of domestic psychiatry, as it established the legal basis for psychiatric care and allowed for mediation of involuntary measures through judicial procedure. It is considered to be the foundation of a new approach to the mentally ill as persons with full civil and political rights and freedoms.

The main new democratic innovations for Russian psychiatry were the two ones of the Law:

1. The mandatory judicial procedure during all involuntary measures (examination, hospitalization, treatment). However, during many involuntary hospitalizations in recent years, the staff of psychiatric hospitals did not follow the mandatory judicial procedure provided for by the Law. Moreover, in 2012, the Independent Psychiatric Association published a paper by its former legal consultant, who in the paper proposed amendments to the Law on Fundamentals of Protection of Public Health in the Russian Federation to legalize involuntary dispensary supervision over persons with mental disorders without their informed consent and court judgment having been taken. Establishing the dispensary supervision over persons specified in part 1 of Article 27 of the Law on Psychiatric Care always leads to legally meaningful consequences for them, such as restrictions on their right to performing specific types of professional occupation and that related to a source of an increased danger.
2. The highly publicized claim of the full equality of rights and freedoms for the mentally disordered and those for all remaining citizens; the clear reference that it is impermissible to restrict the rights and freedoms on the basis alone of having a psychiatric diagnosis, being under dispensary supervision, in an inpatient psychiatric ward or in a psychoneurological institution. The claim does not correspond to the law enforcement practice, under which the rights to be in correspondence without censorship, send and receive parcels, printed matters and remittances, use the telephone, receive visitors can be restricted by the attending doctor, the head of the unit or the head doctor in the interests of health or safety of the patients and others. In addition, the IPA former legal consultant in his paper insisted that the right to daily walks should be added to the list of patients' rights that may be restricted on the recommendation of the attending doctor or the head doctor in the interests of health or safety of patients and others.

According to the Russian psychiatrists Valery Krasnov and Isaac Gurovisch, the Law minimizes and prevents the institutionalization of the mentally ill if their behavior does not pose a danger to others. However, article 38, which was once included in the Law as a guarantee of keeping the whole Law for patients of psychiatric hospitals, is still not working, and, as a result, the service independent of health authorities to defend rights of patients in psychiatric hospitals is still not created.

== Involuntary mental hospitalization ==
In 1989, the World Psychiatric Association issued a statement that includes the following phrase: "Involuntary intervention is a great infringement of the human rights and the fundamental freedom of a patient. Therefore, specific and carefully defined criteria and safeguards are needed for such intervention." The Law establishes substantive and procedural criteria for legitimacy of involuntary hospitalization. Russia is among such countries and their parts as Austria, Belgium, Germany, Israel, the Netherlands, Northern Ireland, Taiwan, and the Canadian province of Ontario that emulated the United States in adopting hospitalization criteria based on the presumed danger of the mentally ill. The same was true of the Soviet Union where the two guidelines of 1961 and 1971 read that the ground for urgent hospitalization was social danger of an ill person. There is such a thing carefully cultivated by authorities as the prejudice that the mentally ill allegedly pose a danger to society, though it is not so: the percentage of criminals among the mentally ill is less than that among the so-called "healthy" population. Statistics show those who are ill with schizophrenia commit fewer illegal acts (less than 1%) than those considered mentally healthy. Involuntary hospitalization in a psychiatric hospital under article 29 of the Law is to meet the following three grounds:

A mentally disturbed individual may be hospitalized in a psychiatric hospital against his will or the will of his legal representative and without a court decision having been taken, if the individual's examination or treatment can only be carried out by in-patient care, and the mental disorder is severe enough to give rise to:

a) a direct danger to the person or to others, or
b) the individual's helplessness, i.e. an inability to take care of himself, or
c) a significant impairment in health as a result of a deteriorating mental condition, if the affected person were to be left without psychiatric care.

Neither direct danger nor severe mental disorder is defined in the Law. According to the IPA president Yuri Savenko, loud claims, importunate molestations, shocking texts in a personal computer, participation in protests, hunger strikes, protest reaction against sudden and rude involuntary measures started to be called a direct danger. According to American psychiatrist Thomas Szasz, the psychiatric formula of "dangerousness to self and others" is very susceptible to changes of medical, political and social fashion. Prior to 1973, homosexuality was such a dangerousness, and since then has no longer been. Psychologist-criminalist Nataliya Varskaya says that neuroleptics that are applied to serious patients make them "vegetables", but the ill stop posing a danger to citizens; alas, but there are no other ways to secure surrounding people against them. She adds, dangerous patients are not cured even in psychiatric hospitals, they were previously kept in the wards for life, doctors examined them every six months and prolonged, prolonged, prolonged their custody; the doctors were aware that these patients are very dangerous, it is inadmissible to let them go to the streets.

The citizen may voluntarily come to a psychiatrist who would find a severe mental disorder that requires the mandatory admission to a psychiatric inpatient unit. If the patient refuses the hospitalization offered to him, the doctor gets the right to start the procedure of involuntary hospitalization. As a psychiatrist says, it is only a psychiatrist who is able to inquire into a patient's condition and to decide whether his refusal to be treated is a free man's conscious choice or a symptom of a mental disorder. In psychiatrist's opinion, the mentally ill often do not feel and do not deem they are ill. They actively avoid therapy and resist all efforts to subject them to it. The more the person resists the inpatient psychiatric ward's demands for his hospitalization, the greater are his chances to find himself indoors or, more precisely, to be left there, because his resistance can be presented by the ward representatives as the lack of his due insight into mental status, as an indication of the severity of his disease. In the same vein, the practice was justified by American psychiatrist Benjamin Rush as early as the eighteenth century: "The more they resist our efforts to serve them, the more they have need of our services." The reluctance of patients to undergo neuroleptic treatment, their "spontaneous irritation", protests, etc. are considered as either unremoved symptoms of mental illness (such as depressive neurosis) or, along with tremor, anxiety, dysphoric mood disorder, as "transitory complications". It is profitable for doctors to hospitalize the person in any cases, then bedspace fills up. Remuneration of the labour of physicians in psychiatric hospitals and funding of the entire industry in Russia are carried out on the basis of the number of beds run by the doctor. Russian human rights activist Valery Abramkin says it should be clear for a Russian patient that each medic legally and illegally snatches his large sum from each bed. However, psychiatrists in their usual way counter the remarks that their funding depends on the number of psychiatric beds by ascribing them to antipsychiatrists and stating that the main motto of antipsychiatrists is the idea that psychiatrists are villains who dream of placing as many people as possible to madhouses.

Data obtained as results of analysing the work of the psychiatric inpatient facilities show that two thirds of patients placed in a hospital without their consent actively refuse hospitalization. In the rest of cases, they are unable to express their attitude to the events because of their mental condition.

== Duration and rate of hospitalization ==
Despite the 1992 Russian Mental Health Law, coercive psychiatry in Russia remains generally unregulated and fashioned by the same trends toward hyperdiagnosis and overreliance on institutional care characteristic of the Soviet period. In Russia, mental health care is meant to be provided by inpatient psychiatric facilities rather than by outpatient services. In the Soviet Union, there had been an increase of the bed numbers because psychiatric services had been used to treat dissidents. In 2005, the Russian Federation had one of the highest levels of psychiatric beds per capita in Europe at 113.2 per 100,000 population, or more than 161,000 beds. In 2014, Russia has 104.8 beds per 100,000 population and no actions have been taken to arrange new facilities for outpatient services. The number of outpatient clinics designed for the primary care of the mentally disordered stopped increasing in 2005 and was reduced to 277 in 2012 as against 318 in 2005. An average patient's stay in a day-and-night inpatient psychiatric facility is extremely long, 75.5 days. Nevertheless, the average rehospitalization rate in the Russian Federation amounts to 21.5%, and the portion of people kept in inpatient facilities longer than one year was 21.7% in 2012 and 22.2% in 2013. Psychiatrist Sofia Dorinskaya says she saw former convicts who have been living in a Russian mental hospital for ten years and will have been staying there until their dying day because of having no home. The total number of the mentally ill registered disabled has increased by 20% over a few years, from 826,036 in 1999 to 1,020,002 in 2008 for the population of 141.9 million in the country (2010 figure).

Persons who do not respond well to treatment at dispensaries can be sent to long-term social care institutions (internats) wherein they remain indefinitely. The internats are managed by oblast Social Protection ministries. Russia had 442 psychoneurologic internats by 1999, and their number amounted to 505 by 2013. The internats provided places for approximately 125,000 people in 2007. In 2013, Russian psychoneurologic internats accommodated 146,000 people, according to the consolidated data of the Department of Social Protection of Moscow and the Ministry of Labour and Social Protection of the Russian Federation. It is supposed that the number of beds in internats is increasing at the same rate with which the number of beds is decreasing in psychiatric hospitals.

Lyubov Vinogradova of the Independent Psychiatric Association of Russia provides the different figure of 122,091 or 85.5 places in psychoneurologic institutions of social protection (internats) per 100,000 population in 2013 and says that Russia is high on Europe's list of the number of places in the institutions. Vinogradova states that many regions have the catastrophic shortage of places in psychoneurological internats, her words point out to the need to increase the number of places there and to the fact that the Independent Psychiatric Association of Russia is forcing transinstitutionalization—relocating the mentally ill from their homes and psychiatric hospitals to psychoneurological internats. As Robert van Voren, the chief executive of the Federation Global Initiative on Psychiatry, supposes, the Russians want to have their compatriots with mental disorders locked up outside the city and do not want to have them in community. Persons in internats are brought to sleepy condition by psychotropic drugs and have to pass through the very long and complex procedure to be discharged from an internat, as shown in the film See Me, Hear Me produced by Russia Today in 2014. However, according to law, the staff does not have the right to treat inmates in psychoneurologic internats.

Russia is decades behind the countries of the European Union in mental health reform, which has already been implemented or is being implemented in them. Until Russian society, Russian psychiatrist Emmanuil Gushansky says, is aware of the need for mental health reform, we will live in the atmosphere of animosity, mistrust and violence.

== Involvement of law enforcement ==
According to Yuri Savenko, the IPA president, law enforcement practice is very far from the letter of the Law. Forensic psychiatric expert examination has deteriorated because of the lack of competition, and courts implicitly fulfill wishes of the hierarchy of executive authority affected by corruption.

Discrediting citizens by initiating far-fetched proceedings to establish grounds for a psychiatric examination is a favorite tactic of Russian officials whose interests are threatened by active members of the public. Police deliver these individuals to a psychiatric facility, ensuring the institution is not downsized, Generally, the more "patients" a facility has, the more funding it receives. Even if the criminal case is dropped due to lack of evidence, it does not affect the dispensaries decision; the person is still classified as "ill".In a nutshell, there is no mechanism to challenge or overturn one's misdiagnosis in Russia.

According to Yuliya Argunova, the IPA lawyer, police officers are obliged under part 3 of article 30 of the Law to assist medical workers in implementing involuntary hospitalization and to ensure safe conditions for the access to the hospitalized person and for his examination. While assisting hospital attendants to enter into the homes of citizens whose names are written by psychoneurological dispensaries on their referrals to hospitalization, police officers have little care about the absence of a court order (which can't even be issued at such a stage), the security of the hospitalized persons, the protection of their personality and preservation of their property.

According to psychiatrist Sofia Dorinskaya, the situation always develops in the same way: either in the evening or at night, or in the early morning, when a person sleeps, the police break the door down in his apartment or room, handcuff and escort them directly or through a police office to a mental hospital, where the door is closed behind the person. The suspected person sits face to face with a psychiatrist, then everything written by the psychiatrist will be a proof of the person's mental illness for the judge in court. However, there is no system that verifies the psychiatrist's statements, so the activities of the accused are often falsified, even when the patient says or performs nothing abnormal. One case, described by lawyers Yuri Ershov and Nataliya Kozlova, depicts an ambulance arriving with a rescue service brigade, in order for the person's front door to be broken down after the person refused to open the door. The doctor involved considered that the indignant reaction of the person to such situation was abnormal and sufficient to justify his hospitalization. In her book The Psychiatrist's Notes, Dorinskaya depicts how a person well oriented in place and time was hospitalized because of a 'fit of schizophrenia', as described in the referral to his hospitalization. In addition, the referral reported that "he beat his wife and used bad language". Dorinskaya writes how she and her colleagues forged many signatures of their patients on the forms of consent to hospitalization in medical histories before a prosecutor's investigation. She cites the dialog: "And what if a signature does not match?"—"And who will investigate?"

Although Ershov and Kozlova describe that it is easy for the lawyer to come to places of confinement and meet with his client and the administration of the penal colony after going through the formalities stipulated in law, the lawyers have to litigate for the right to get into a psychiatric hospital.

As St. Petersburg lawyer Fanis Khalikov notes, the information about the time and place of the court session may simply be hidden from the hospitalized person and his representative. The hospitalized person may learn that he is in court at the time when the court session is underway or ready to start presently, when nothing can be done to ensure self-defence. It also happens that the person is not given an opportunity to contact his representative (lawyer), who could defend his interests in court, or with relatives (confidential agents, acquaintances, human rights organizations) so that they find and get a defence attorney to court. Or the defence attorney is not given an opportunity to meet with the hospitalized person; all possible obstacles are placed to prevent it. The hospitalized person is subjected to psychiatric treatment without his consent (and without the consent of the court) as soon as he finds himself in a psychiatric inpatient ward. Psychotropic drugs with effects varying in intensity are compulsorily administered into his body. As a result of having been drugged, the patient sometimes appears before the court in such a state that his look and behavior, caused by the influence of these drugs, can convince the judge that he sees a really inadequate person who is in need of psychiatric care. The patient is often in such an intoxication-induced condition that he is unable to put two words together, not to mention any real defence of his rights.

According to the statement made by the IPA executive director Lyubov Vinogradova in 2005, a court comes to a hospital where it must make a number of judgments as to whether rightly or wrongly the hospital applies for the involuntary treatment of a person. The court makes its judgments for 20 cases within 20 minutes. In practice it means that the judge automatically signs judgments offered to him ready-made by the staff to allow for the involuntary treatments to continue.

According to Doctor of Legal Sciences Vladimir Ovchinsky, regional differences in forensic psychiatric expert reports are striking. For example, in some regions of Russia, 8 or 9 percent of all examinees are pronounced sane; in other regions up to 75 percent of all examinees are pronounced sane. In some regions less than 2 percent of examinees are declared schizophrenics; in other regions up to 80 percent of examinees are declared schizophrenics.

The Russian legislation did not implement Principle 18 of the Principles for the Protection of Persons with Mental Illness and the Improvement of Mental Health Care, approved by the UN General Assembly in 1991, with respect to a patient's right to an independent psychiatric report. According to a report by the European Committee Against Torture, the Law does not reflect a patient's right to obtain the judgment for involuntary hospitalization. In a hospital courtroom, the judge announces the judgment, but the patient does not obtain any motivated judgment. There are sometimes cases where the patient is not informed by the court at all and hears about the judgment from his or her treating doctor or head of the unit. Since the judgment for involuntary hospitalization, as a rule, is not delivered to the hospitalized person, he cannot appeal against the judgment in appeal hearing. In other cases, the documents sent by him are censored and left in his medical record if not erased. The hospitalized person also does not have opportunities to attend the court to obtain a copy of the judgment or come to the post office to send a complaint against the judgment.

=== Exceptions of the use of law enforcement ===
Article 29 of the Law concerning involuntary hospitalization in a mental hospital shall not apply to senior officials and the judiciary on the ground that they are vested with parliamentary or judicial immunity. A psychiatrist who violates this rule can be deprived of his or her diploma and sentenced to imprisonment. Passport data of persons vested with parliamentary or judicial immunity shall be included in the computer database, which is available to every psychiatric institution and shall be used by every psychiatrist before addressing the issue of involuntary hospitalization of a person in a psychiatric hospital. Psychiatrists commented on how to treat the judge vested with judicial immunity as follows: "While knowing that the person in twilight state is dangerous and may kill or maim people nearby, the psychiatrist should provide this information to the regional court so that three judges of the court within 10 days can send to the Supreme Court of the country a petition for the removal of immunity from the judge. It is only a possible victim who should be worried about the fact that aggressive actions are likely to happen now because twilight state is usually short-lived. The victim may suffer or die, but it would happen in strict accordance with the Law on the Status of Judges!" According to the next item of the commentary, the psychiatrist has no right to subject the incumbent President of the Russian Federation to the procedure of involuntary psychiatric examination or involuntary hospitalization.

== Amendments and changes ==
Amendments and changes were included in the Law several times: on 21 July 1998, 25 July 2002, 10 January 2003, 29 June and 22 August 2004, 27 July 2010, 7 February, 6 April, 21 November 2011.

Over five years, from 1998 to 2003, the Serbsky Center made three attempts to submit for the Duma readings of amendments and additions to the Law, but the IPA and general public managed to successfully challenge these amendments, and they were finally tabled. According to the IPA, these amendments to the Law, if adopted, would have impaired patients' rights. In 2004, for instance, proponents of mental health reform could hardly prevent the effort by the doctors of the Serbsky Center to roll back some reforms in the Law.

In November 2012, Mikhail Vinogradov, an expert of the Serbsky Center, said: "We must restore the legal act that was in the Soviet Union;" he noted that the request by a large group of Petersburg and Moscow psychiatrists to restore the old mental health act was submitted to the State Duma. At the same time, Vinogradov expressed the opinion that the Soviet mental health act "has never been used for political persecution." Human rights activists who claim it did, in Vinogradov's words, "are not very mentally healthy." However, Valeriya Novodvorskaya is widely known to have been arrested "for insulting President" in September 1990 and kept in a psychiatric hospital until August 1991. In December 2012, Mikhail Vinogradov repeated his point, "My opinion: we should completely cancel the current Mental Health Law. One cannot give patients the right to decide their fate." He added, "Do you talk about human rights activists? Most of them are just unhealthy people, I talked with them. As for the dissident General Grigorenko, I too saw him, kept him under observation, and noted oddities of his thinking. But he was eventually allowed to go abroad, as you know… Who? Bukovsky? I talked with him, and he is a completely crazy character. But he too was allowed to go abroad! You see, human rights activists are people who, due to their mental pathology, are unable to restrain themselves within the standards of society, and the West encourages their inability to do so."

On the other hand, Leonid Kitaev-Smyk, a doctor and psychologist who specialized in extreme conditions, believes that unscrupulous people may use certain provisions of the Soviet mental health act, if restored, as a tool to settle scores, as was in Soviet times. He says, "In some particular cases, people will simply write complaints against a person, will subject him to involuntary psychiatric examination. And he can be declared crazy after some bribe money have been paid. Creative, nonordinary, talented people have labile (as scientists say) nervous system, movable psychics. And they can be declared not quite normal mentally and, perhaps, even dangerous." Sergei Shishkov, the key lawyer of the Serbsky Center, also disagreed with Vinogradov, "We are unlikely to return to the Soviet mental health act. It would be contrary to the international norms, which Russia has joined, as well as to the Russian Constitution. Article 29 of the Mental Health Law allows placing dangerous patients in a hospital. But when following necessary judicial procedures. If a patient is too socially dangerous, he is placed in a hospital, and a judgment is made through the court post factum. If a patient cannot be left without treatment, but he does not give his consent to the examination, there is such a concept as "deferred examination", or examination postscriptum."

== Criticism ==
=== Problems with enforcement ===
According to St Petersburg psychiatrist Vladimir Pshizov, the current Law is a boon and works out when having the informal human attitude to the patient. However, as Pshizov notes, a disastrous factor for domestic psychiatry is that those involved in political abuse of psychiatry in the Soviet Union were allowed to stay on their positions until they decide to retire. Those who retained their positions and influence turned domestic psychiatry from politically motivated one to criminally motivated one because the sphere of interests of this public has been reduced to making a business of psychopharmacologic drugs and taking possession of the homes of the ill. This view is repeated by Alexander Danilin, who says that the Mental Health Law is certainly a progressive thing but, in reality, nothing changes because real change will only happen when specialists change their viewpoints and methods.

According to Russian psychiatrist Emmanuil Gushansky, the Law "On Psychiatric Care and Guarantees of Citizens' Rights during Its Provision" that has been in force since 1993 is declaratory in nature and does not guarantee any rights. Not only the general and reference items of the Law but also its articles of direct application, which apply to the procedure of involuntary psychiatric examination, involuntary hospitalization, to the procedure of interning and keeping the mentally ill in long-term psychiatric care institutions ("internats" in Russian), are violated in the grossest way.

Legal control over observing the Mental Health Law is not exercised. Psychiatry is the only medical specialty in which the doctor is given the right to violence for the benefit of the patient. The application of violence must be based on the mental health law, must be as much as possible transparent and monitored by representatives of the interests of persons who are in need of involuntary examination and treatment. While being hospitalized in a psychiatric hospital for urgent indications, the patient should be accompanied by his relatives, witnesses, or other persons authorized to control the actions of doctors and law-enforcement agencies. Otherwise, psychiatry becomes an obedient maid for administrative and governmental agencies and is deprived of its medical function. It is the police that must come to the aid of citizens and is responsible for their security. Only later, after the appropriate legal measures for social protection have been taken, the psychiatrist must respond to the queries of law enforcement and judicial authorities by solving the issues of involuntary hospitalization, sanity, etc.

In Russia, the psychiatrist is vested with punitive functions, is involved in involuntary hospitalization and, according to Gushansky, the state machine hides behind his back, actually manipulating the doctor. The police are reluctant to investigate offences committed by the mentally ill. After receiving the information about their disease, the bodies of inquiry very often stop the investigation and do not bring it to the level of investigative actions. Thereby psychiatry becomes a cloak for the course of justice and, by doing so, serves as a source for the rightlessness and stigmatization of both psychiatrists and persons with mental disorders. The negative attitude to psychiatrists is thereby supported by the state machine and is accompanied by the aggression against the doctors, which increases during the periods of social unrest.

=== Problems with legislation ===
According to psychiatrist Sofia Dorinskaya, the law is in conflict with the Constitution of the Russian Federation. In judicial system, there is procedure for collecting evidence. If a person does not sign a transcript of interrogation or if he signed it, he in court can say that he was forced to sign, and the judge will investigate this. Anyway, it is stipulated. In psychiatry, a person's opinion is not considered to be something more or less reasonable at all.

Psychotherapist Elena Romek, after making an analysis of the Law, came to the same conclusion that provisions of the Law are in conflict with civil rights guaranteed by the Constitution of the Russian Federation, universally recognized norms of international law, professional and ethical norms of medicine, and presumption of innocence. If violence (involuntary examination, isolation, etc.), she says, is, in fact, used by doctors in accordance with the Hippocratic Oath to do everything to save the patient's life, the listed criteria should be generally valid, i.e. applied also to somatic diseases.

The 1993 law is outdated, according to lawyer Vladislav Lapinsky, who took part in its passage. The law has been foremost for the Russian Federation within those times but now is already outdated and does not have many issues written in. Lapinsky says a very big issue is that the judges are not experts in psychiatry and cannot evaluate the patient's condition objectively. On this ground, the judges in courts openly declare that if the doctors in a mental hospital said that the person is sick, they will not check whether healthy or not he is, whether he needs to be hospitalized or not. They just do what they are told by psychiatrists, and psychiatrists for various reasons are very often motivated to place the person in a psychiatric hospital.

According to Romek, the restriction of civil rights of a person to the extent of his forced isolation based on the possibility alone of his committing illegal acts, which is defined through the notions about it in psychiatry—a discipline very far not only from jurisprudence but from socio-humanitarian knowledge in general, clearly violates the fundamental principle of the democratic justice—presumption of innocence. Since, on the one hand, psychiatry considers a great number of organic anomalies (any brain damages, hormonal imbalances, infectious diseases, etc.) as potential causes of criminal insanity and, on the other hand, the diagnostics of mental disorders is based on very vague descriptions of abnormal behavior, almost anyone can be subjected to involuntary hospitalization by the criterion of social danger and in strict accordance with the Law.

In addition to the constitution and general international law, the Moscow Helsinki Group (MHG) asserts that current legislation does not comply with the European practice of mental health care. MHG legal programs head, Natalia Kravchuk, commented on the case of Rakevich v. Russia considered in the European Court of Human Rights:

… Russian legislation in this area is featureless and vague. It is for this reason that it is so hard for people to assert their rights, and they have to reach the European Court of Human Rights.

St. Petersburg lawyer Fanis Khalikov believes that the mental health legislation is subject to fundamental and in-depth reforming, because it is the current editions of the Law No. 3185-1 and other regulations (for example, Chapter 35 of the Code of Civil Procedure of the Russian Federation) that do not hold strength.

=== Direct misuse ===
Vladimir Rotstein, a doctrinist of Snezhnevsky's school, states, if the relatives of a "not dangerous" patient with psychosis promise to "reward" the ambulance drivers, then the patient will be hospitalized. The ambulance drivers will ensure that the patient sign a "consent". As well as legislation being unobserved (the patient was hospitalized, though he tried to refuse) there are also more direct abuses of power. Rotstein says, "As for preventing abuses on the part of the state so that Chaadaev and suchlike are not declared mad, it would be at least naive to hope that the Law is able to prevent them." Rotstein sums up his opinion by quoting Alexander Pushkin's aphorism, "In Russia there is no law—There is only a pillar; and on that pillar—a crown."

Nikolay Suatbaev expressed a similar opinion, stating that unlawful behavior should be dealt with by police, a public prosecutor's office, a court, even if an offender is mentally ill; after all, only if he is not deprived of his legal capacity, he has rights and obligations equal to those of the healthy. The refusal to institute criminal proceedings is Illegal if based on the fact alone that the offender is on the psychiatrist's registry and all the more so if accompanied by the delivery of the materials "for taking measures" to the dispensary, which by definition is not a punitive organ. It corrupts the ill and undermines the reputation of psychiatrists, Suatbaev says. New York City, for example, has no dispensaries at all, and if a person broke the law, it is a problem of the police; only later psychiatrists investigate if there is concern of a mental health issue, Vladimir Pshizov writes.

There have been many cases where orphans have been indicted to be sent to psychiatric hospitals, often when the accused are perfectly healthy. In 2010, 20 out of 72 orphans from an orphanage in Komsomolsk-on-Amur were placed in a psychiatric hospital and exposed to neuroleptic medication. The city prosecutor found that all the children were placed in the hospital to be treated for "emotional disorders" without having been examined by a commission of psychiatrists or provided for by a court judgment. The children told they had been warned that they would be sent to a madhouse because of their bad behavior. Infant orphans who came of age and received a diagnosis in a psychiatric hospital are sent to psychoneurological internats without asking their consent. There a new problem arises: quite legally capable people cannot get out of there, work, start their family and live a normal life.

In 2003, lawyer Mikhail Fomin noted that psychiatrists were given preference in order to encroach upon the homes of the elderly and single people. It would seem that the law must counteract such manipulations in psychiatry but, in reality, the law leads to numerous abuses following which single pensioners are sent to internats to live the rest of their life there. In Fomin's words, no one disputes that only a specialist can make a diagnosis but vesting a psychiatrist with the unlimited power to decide the fate of a person is an extreme legislative innovation peculiar at present only to Russia. The very strict control over involuntary internment in a psychiatric institution is exercised in other countries, specifically on the part of the Church, but Russian public organizations are almost powerless.

In 2008, during a scientific and practical conference held by the Advocacy Chamber of the Moscow Oblast, 200 leading legal scholars and human rights defenders noted the same trend when a tool for "relatively honest" encroachment upon property more and more often became the Mental Health Law. In 2014, legal proceedings started against a criminal "black realtors" group that took away apartments from patients of a town narcology dispensary in Novocherkassk. According to the data of law-enforcement agencies alone, the doctors sold seven apartments of patients and tried to do so in six cases more. An ill person who has lost his home often becomes a tramp, and citizens with no fixed abode, as a rule, do not appeal to the police.

According to the 2013 interview of the representatives of the Independent Psychiatric Association of Russia to Radio Free Europe, because of the Russian Mental Health Law, sending people away for a month in a mental hospital is easy for prosecutors—with the help of pliable judges—and becomes an increasingly common tactic in the country's campaigns against political dissidence, extremism, and corruption.

Robert van Voren says, "The law itself is OK but the abuse of it exists." The same occasionally happens in many countries monitored by the Global Initiative on Psychiatry. Psychiatry is regarded as a handy tool to solve disputes, and one can easily buy a diagnosis from a psychiatrist. In most of the countries, forensic psychiatry has changed only slightly, the strong resistance to introducing the modern practices of forensic psychiatry is due to not disparities in schools or views but the fact that the reform of the system would mean the end of corruption. Criminals pay off their imprisonment of many years by having themselves declared insane. Wealthy husbands declare about the mental illnesses in their wives to get rid of them and yet keep control over their children. Children declare their parents and grandparents legally incapable to sell their apartments. Even medical institutions recognize their patients as insane to take their property.

=== Civil rights concerns ===
Russian psychiatrists Valery Krasnov, Isaak Gurovich and Alexey Bobrov suppose the Law works successfully enough, though the results of monitorings show that the violations of the rights of patients in psychiatric hospitals are massive. Most psychiatric institutions deny patients the right to receive information about the condition of their mental health, copies of medical documents. The grounds of placing in a hospital are not only undisclosed and unexplained to patients, but even are concealed from them, their consent to hospitalization and treatment are forged. The patient's right to send uncensored complaints and petitions to authorities, the prosecutor's office, court is ignored. Such correspondence is opened and inspected and, instead of being sent to the recipient, is filed to the medical history. Some hospitals censor not only outgoing correspondence (as doctors say, "not to send claptrap") but also ingoing one ("not to injure the patient").

Because of omissions of the administration of hospitals, patients are, as a rule, deprived of daily walks, the right to use the telephone. They are forbidden to see lawyers and other representatives chosen by them, to receive representatives of human rights organizations. In many hospitals, telephone calls and appointments with relatives are allowed only in the presence of attendant staff (a nurse, social worker or hospital attendant), that violates the privacy of such meetings. Receiving an appointment requires beforehand permission of the administration. The patient's natural right to privacy is not implemented. In all psychiatric hospitals, there are patients who are there not for medical but exclusively for social indications, including conflict relationships with family members who live with them.

According to former Radio Liberty commentator Eugene Novozhilov, human rights of a person registered in a psychiatric dispensary in Russia exist only on paper. In the eyes of "law-enforcement agencies", such a person in any situation is always guilty even if attacked and beaten. Such a person can be deprived of his liberty by being placed in a mental hospital for an indefinite period of time. Then he can be declared legally incapable and stripped of property and all his rights. With the help of psychotropic drugs in a psychiatric hospital, a vegetable can be made out of a person within a week.

Lyubov Vinogradova believes the law is good in theory, but in reality there has been a continuous reduction in patients' rights as independent experts are now excluded from processes, cannot speak in court and can do nothing against the State experts.

=== Disasters ===
A 2006 fire in a drug rehabilitation clinic in Moscow killed forty-five female patients; the windows of the clinic had bars fitted to them. In 2013 a psychiatric hospital north of Moscow, which also housed patients with alcohol and drug addiction, and also had bars fitted to all windows, saw the deaths of thirty-six patients and two doctors. Official sources said that some of the victims were tied to their beds.

== Related international documents ==
In the countries of the former Soviet Union, there is very limited knowledge and understanding of declarations and international documents that guarantee the rights of the mentally ill and include the ethical codes, adopted by the World Psychiatric Association, and the Convention on the Rights of Persons with Disabilities with far-reaching implications for the mental health profession. Individual cases can be solved by litigation at the European Court of Human Rights in Strasbourg, however it does not change the attitudes of both mental health professionals and government officials.

== Reports on failures ==
In December 2013, the Independent Psychiatric Association of Russia wrote to the World Psychiatric Association the open letter "On the failure of the Mental Health Law and alarming trends in domestic forensic psychiatry." The letter reports on the failure of article 38 of the Law and requests to dispatch the audit commission to investigate a number of cases published in the Nezavisimiy Psikhiatricheskiy Zhurnal—the herald of the IPA, and at first to express formal concern about the contents of its letter.

== Sources ==
- "Закон Российской Федерации «О психиатрической помощи и гарантиях прав граждан при ее оказании» от 02.07.1992 г. №3185-I" [The Law of the Russian Federation "On Psychiatric Care and Guarantees of Citizens' Rights during Its Provision"] (in Russian). The State Duma of the Russian Federation, the Department of Law. Archived from the original on 13 December 2013.
- "17 лет неисполнения закона — цена доверия к власти и киргизский опыт" [17 years of the failure to observe the Law is the price of confidence in the government, and Kyrgyz experience]. Nezavisimiy Psikhiatricheskiy Zhurnal [The Independent Psychiatric Journal] (in Russian) (1): 85–86. 2009.
- "Взгляд на реформу психиатрической помощи на XIII съезде НПА России" [The view to the reform of psychiatric care at the XIII Congress of the IPA of Russia]. Nezavisimiy Psikhiatricheskiy Zhurnal [The Independent Psychiatric Journal] (in Russian) (2): 15–19. 2008a.
- "Визит в Россию европейского комитета против пыток" [The visit of the European Committee Against Torture to Russia]. Nezavisimiy Psikhiatricheskiy Zhurnal [The Independent Psychiatric Journal] (in Russian) (4): 88–91. 2008.
- "Врачи предлагают вернуть советский закон о психиатрии" [Doctors offer to restore Soviet mental health act] (in Russian). Russian News Service [Русская служба новостей]. 15 November 2012.
- "История отечественного законодательства о психиатрической помощи" [The history of the domestic mental health legislation] (in Russian). RIA Novosti. 13 May 2012.
- "Лиц со статусом неприкосновенности не надо лечить без их письменного согласия?" [Persons with the status of immunity should not be treated without their consent having been taken?]. Nezavisimiy Psikhiatricheskiy Zhurnal [The Independent Psychiatric Journal] (in Russian) (4): 86. 2007a.
- "О невыполнении закона о психиатрической помощи и о тревожных тенденциях в отечественной судебной психиатрии (Открытое письмо НПА России во Всемирную Психиатрическую ассоциацию)" [On the failure of the Mental Health Law and alarming trends in domestic forensic psychiatry (The open letter by the IPA of Russia to the World Psychiatric Association)] (in Russian). The Independent Psychiatric Association of Russia.
- "Проблема социальной опасности психически больных" [The problem of the social danger of the mentally ill]. Nezavisimiy Psikhiatricheskiy Zhurnal [The Independent Psychiatric Journal] (in Russian) (4): 12–17. 2007b.
- "Психиатры пытаются вернуть закон о психиатрической помощи, который был при Советском Союзе" [Psychiatrists try to return the mental health act that was under the Soviet Union]. Накануне.RU (in Russian). 12 November 2012.
- "Психолог-криминалист: У Дмитрия Виноградова – именно психическая болезнь, а не временное помутнение рассудка" [Psychologist-criminalist: Dmitry Vinogradov has a mental illness, not a temporary distraction]. Vechernyaya Moskva (in Russian). 5 September 2013.
- "Ряд врачей предлагают вернуть советский закон о психиатрии" [A number of doctors offer to restore Soviet mental health act]. Nezavisimaya Gazeta (in Russian). 15 November 2012.
- "WPA Statement and Viewpoints on the Rights and Legal Safeguards of the Mentally III (adopted by the WPA General Assembly in Athens, 17th October, 1989)". WPA Bulletin (1). World Psychiatric Association: 29–33. 1990. Russian text: "Положение и взгляды Всемирной психиатрической ассоциации о правах и юридической защите психических больных" [WPA Statement and Viewpoints on the Rights and Legal Safeguards of the Mentally III] (in Russian). Independent Psychiatric Association of Russia. 17 October 1989. Archived from the original on 27 August 2013.
- Abramkin, Valery [Валерий Абрамкин] (17 November 2005). "Мошенники" [Swindlers] (in Russian). Russian Journal.
- Abramyan, Syuzanna [Сюзанна Абрамян] (2013). "Классификация прав граждан, страдающих психическими расстройствами" [Classification of rights of citizens with mental disorders]. Гуманитарные, социально-экономические и социальные науки [Humanities, Social-economic and Social Sciences] (in Russian) (3).
- Afanasyev, Ivan; Vaganov, Arseniy [Иван Афанасьев, Арсений Ваганов] (30 October 2003). "Европа повязала российских санитаров" [Europe fettered Russian aid-men] (in Russian). Gazeta.ru.
- Agamirov, Karen [Карэн Агамиров] (25 January 2005). "Человек имеет право. Карательная психиатрия: постигнет ли Китай участь Советского Союза, исключенного в 1983 году из членов Всемирной Ассоциации психиатров, и подтягивается ли к ним Россия?" [Man has the right. Punitive psychiatry: will China suffer the same fate as the Soviet Union expelled from members of the World Psychiatric Association in 1983, and is Russia moving closer up to them?]. Радио Свобода (in Russian). Radio Liberty.
- Agamirov, Karen [Карэн Агамиров] (17 July 2007). "Человек имеет право. Право на защиту от карательной психиатрии" [Man has the right. The right to defence against punitive psychiatry]. Радио Свобода (in Russian). Radio Liberty.
- Appelbaum, Paul (1997). "Almost a Revolution: An International Perspective on the Law of Involuntary Commitment" (PDF). The Journal of the American Academy of Psychiatry and the Law. 25 (2): 135–147. PMID 9213286.
- Argunova, Yuliya [Юлия Аргунова] (2011). "Откройте, полиция! О «содействии» сотрудников полиции медицинским работникам" [Open, police! (On "assistance" of police officers to medical workers)]. Nezavisimiy Psikhiatricheskiy Zhurnal [The Independent Psychiatric Journal] (in Russian) (3): 48–51.
- Argunova, Yuliya [Юлия Аргунова] (2012). "Представитель пациента" [Representative of the patient]. Nezavisimiy Psikhiatricheskiy Zhurnal [The Independent Psychiatric Journal] (in Russian) (4): 50–57.
- Argunova, Yuliya [Юлия Аргунова] (2007). Права граждан с психическими расстройствами [The rights of citizens with mental disorders] (in Russian). Moscow: Фолиум [Folium]. p. 9. Archived from the original on 2011-06-27.
- Asriyants, Sergei; Chernova, Natalia [Cергей Асриянц, Наталья Чернова] (17 February 2010). "Юрий Савенко и Любовь Виноградова (интервью)" [Yuri Savenko and Lyubov Vinogradova (interview)]. Novaya Gazeta (in Russian). Archived from the original on 24 December 2013.
- Bloch, Sidney (1 March 1990). "Athens and beyond: Soviet psychiatric abuse and the World Psychiatric Association". Psychiatric Bulletin. 14 (3): 129–133. doi:10.1192/pb.14.3.129.
- Bonnie, Richard (2002). "Political Abuse of Psychiatry in the Soviet Union and in China: Complexities and Controversies" (PDF). The Journal of the American Academy of Psychiatry and the Law. 30 (1): 136–144. PMID 11931362. Archived from the original (PDF) on 28 September 2011.
- Burkov, Leonid [Леонид Бурков] (2006). "Принудительная госпитализация душевнобольных в Российской Федерации в соответствии со ст. 5 Европейской конвенции о защите прав человека и основных свобод" [Involuntary hospitalization of the mentally ill in the Russian Federation in accordance with art. 5 of the European Convention for the Protection of Human Rights and Fundamental Freedoms] (PDF). Правоведение [Science of Law] (in Russian) (2). St Petersburg: Издательство С.-Петербургского университета [The publishing house of the St Petersburg University]: 120–136.
- Chernova, Nataliya [Наталья Чернова] (17 February 2014). "Жертвоприношение: К российским детям-сиротам применяются методы карательной психиатрии" [Oblation: Methods of punitive psychiatry are applied to Russian infant orphans]. Novaya Gazeta (in Russian).
- Clark, Fiona (11 January 2014). "Is psychiatry being used for political repression in Russia?". The Lancet. 383 (9912): 114–115. doi:10.1016/S0140-6736(13)62706-3. PMID 24422214.
- Coalson, Robert (18 April 2013). "Whistle-Blower's Case Revives Concerns Of Punitive Psychiatry In Russia". Radio Free Europe.
- Danilin, Alexander [Александр Данилин] (28 March 2008). "Тупик" [Deadlock]. Russkaya Zhizn (in Russian).
- Dmitrieva, Tatyana; Krasnov, Valery; Neznanov, Nikolai; Semke, Valentin; Tiganov, Alexander [Татьяна Дмитриева, Валерий Краснов, Николай Незнанов, Валентин Семке, Александр Тиганов], eds. (2011). Психиатрия: Национальное руководство [Psychiatry: National manual] (in Russian). Moscow: ГЭОТАР-Медиа [GEOTAR-Media]. p. 83. ISBN 978-5-9704-2030-0.
- Dobrynina, Tatiyana [Татьяна Добрынина] (16 November 2012). "Поножовщина в военном городке" [Knifing in a military townlet]. Южноуралец [Yuzhnouralian] (in Russian).
- Dorinskaya, Sofia [Софья Доринская] (2014). Записки психиатра [The Psychiatrist's Notes] (in Russian). Moscow: Издательство Русского физического общества «Общественная польза» [The publishing house of the Russian Physical Society "Public Benefit"]. ISBN 978-5-85617-122-7.
- Ershov, Yuri; Kozlova, Nataliya [Юрий Ершов, Наталья Козлова] (7 October 2008). "Принудительно безумен" [Forcibly declared mad]. Rossiyskaya Gazeta (in Russian). Archived from the original on 6 January 2014.
- Evtushenko, Valery (2009). Yastrebov, Vasily [Валерий Евтушенко, Василий Ястребов] (ed.). Закон РФ «О психиатрической помощи и гарантиях прав граждан при её оказании» в вопросах и ответах [The Law of the Russian Federation "On Psychiatric Care and Guarantees of Citizens' Rights during Its Provision" in questions and answers] (PDF) (in Russian). Moscow: ЗАО Юстицинформ [Closed joint-stock company Justitsinform]. ISBN 978-5-9977-0001-0.
- Felthous, Alan; Sass, Henning, eds. (2012). "The Law of hospitalization in Russia". International Handbook on Psychopathic Disorders and the Law. John Wiley & Sons. p. 43. ISBN 978-0-470-06644-7.
- Fomin, Mikhail (2003). "Psychiatrists have been given godlike powers". The Current Digest of the Post-Soviet Press. 55 (6). American Association for the Advancement of Slavic Studies: 9. Russian text: Fomin, Mikhail [Михаил Фомин] (19 February 2003). "Психиатрам дали полномочия Бога" [Psychiatrists have been given godlike powers]. Rossiyskaya Gazeta (in Russian). Archived from the original on January 6, 2014.
- Gluzman, Semyon [Семён Глузман] (2013). "История психиатрических репрессий" [The history of psychiatric repression]. Вестник Ассоциации психиатров Украины [The Herald of the Ukrainian Psychiatric Association] (in Russian) (2). The Ukrainian Psychiatric Association.
- Gluzman, Semyon [Семён Глузман] (2012a). "Как я писал закон для СССР" [How I wrote the Law for the USSR]. Вестник Ассоциации психиатров Украины [The Herald of the Ukrainian Psychiatric Association] (in Russian) (1). The Ukrainian Psychiatric Association.
- Gluzman, Semyon [Семён Глузман] (2012b). "Так появился украинский закон" [In that way the Ukrainian Law appeared]. Вестник Ассоциации психиатров Украины [The Herald of the Ukrainian Psychiatric Association] (in Russian) (2). The Ukrainian Psychiatric Association.
- Goble, Paul (13 November 2012). "Russia Considering Restoring Soviet-Era Law on Psychiatry, Opening Door to Political Abuse". Eurasia Daily Monitor. 9 (208). Russian text: Гобл, Пол (15 November 2012). "Россия может восстановить советский закон о психиатрии, удобный для политических преследований" [Russia Considering Restoring Soviet-Era Law on Psychiatry, Opening Door to Political Abuse] (in Russian). inoSMI.
- Gorelik, Kristina [Кристина Горелик] (12 November 2005). "Возвращение карательной психиатрии?" [The return of punitive psychiatry?]. Радио Свобода (in Russian). Radio Liberty.
- Gushansky, Emmanuil [Эммануил Гушанский] (1999). "Нужны ли правозащитники в психиатрии?" [Are human rights activists needed in psychiatry?]. Российский бюллетень по правам человека [Russian Bulletin on Human Rights] (in Russian) (13). Moscow: Изд-во Института прав человека [Publishing House of the Human Rights Institute]. Archived from the original on 19 January 2013.
- Gushansky, Emmanuil [Эммануил Гушанский] (2010a). "Нужны ли правозащитники в психиатрии?" [Are human rights activists needed in psychiatry?] (PDF). Адвокатская палата [Advocatory chamber] (in Russian) (8). Moscow: Адвокатская палата Московской области [The Advocatory chamber of the Moscow oblast]: 23–25.
- Gushansky, Emmanuil [Эммауил Гушанский] (23 November 2010b). "Право на насилие" [The right to violence]. Троицкий вариант — Наука [Troitsky Variant — Science] (in Russian).
- Gushansky, Emmanuil [Эммауил Гушанский] (14 September 2010c). "Язык как лечебное средство" [Language as a remedy]. Троицкий вариант — Наука [Troitsky Variant — Science] (in Russian).
- Gushansky, Emmanuil [Эммауил Гушанский] (2005). "Предисловие к книге Анатолия Прокопенко «Безумная психиатрия»" [Preface to the book by Anatoly Prokopenko Mad Psychiatry]. In Taras, Anatoly [Анатолий Tapac] (ed.). Карательная психиатрия [Punitive psychiatry] (in Russian). Moscow & Minsk: АСТ, Харвест [AST, Harvest]. p. 35. ISBN 5-17-030172-3.
- Ilina, Alexandra [Александра Ильина] (13 May 2014). "Не волнуйся, тебя больше никто никуда не заберет" [Don't worry, nobody won't take you anywhere anymore]. Профиль [Profile] (in Russian). Archived from the original on 14 May 2014.
- Jenkins, Rachel; Lancashire, Stuart; McDaid, David; Samyshkin, Yevgeniy; Green, Samantha; Watkins, Jonathan; Potasheva, Angelina; Nikiforov, Alexey; Bobylova, Zinaida; Gafurov, Valery; Goldberg, David; Huxley, Peter; Lucas, Jo; Purchase, Nick; Atun, Rifat (November 2007). "Mental health reform in the Russian Federation: an integrated approach to achieve social inclusion and recovery". Bulletin of the World Health Organization. 85 (11). the World Health Organization: 858–866. doi:10.2471/blt.06.039156. PMC 2636246. PMID 18038076. Archived from the original on January 9, 2014.
- Khalikov, Fanis [Фанис Халиков] (19 October 2012). "Ну сумасшедший, что возьмешь?" [What can you expect of crazy?]. эж-Юрист [ezh-Jurist] (in Russian).
- Khwaja, Barbara (26 May 2017). "Health Reform in Revolutionary Russia". Socialist Health Association.
- Kondratev, Fedor [Фёдор Кондратьев] (2010). Судьбы больных шизофренией: клинико-социальный и судебно-психиатрический аспекты [The fates of the ill with schizophrenia: clinico-social and forensico-psychiatric aspects] (PDF) (in Russian). Moscow: ЗАО Юстицинформ [Closed joint-stock company Justitsinform].
- Koryagin, Anatoliy (July 1990). "Compulsion in psychiatry: blessing or curse?". The Psychiatrist. 14 (7): 394–398. doi:10.1192/pb.14.7.394.
- Kostyukevich, Marina [Марина Костюкевич] (13 November 2012). "Защищать здоровых людей от социально опасных должен закон" [The Law shall protect healthy people from the socially dangerous] (in Russian). ВестиFM [TheNewsFM].
- Kovalyov, Andrei [Андрей Ковалёв] (2007). "Взгляд очевидца на предысторию принятия закона о психиатрической помощи" [View of the eyewitness to the backstory of the adoption of the Mental Health Law]. Nezavisimiy Psikhiatricheskiy Zhurnal [The Independent Psychiatric Journal] (in Russian) (3): 82–90.
- Krasnov, Valery; Gurovich, Isaak (August 2012). "History and current condition of Russian psychiatry". International Review of Psychiatry. 24 (4): 328–333. doi:10.3109/09540261.2012.694857. PMID 22950772.
- Krasnov, Valery; Gurovich, Isaak; Bobrov, Alexey (April 2010). "Russian Federation: mental healthcare and reform" (PDF). International Psychiatry. 7 (2): 39–41. doi:10.1192/S1749367600005725. PMC 6734957. PMID 31508031.
- Larina, Alyona [Алёна Ларина] (23 January 2014). "В Новочеркасске осудили члена банды "черных риелторов"" [In Novocherkassk, a member of a "black realtors" gang was convicted]. Rossiyskaya Gazeta (in Russian).
- Lewis, Cynthia (1989). "The Soviet Psychiatric Assistance Statute of 1988: An Uncertain Prognosis". American University International Law Review. 4 (3): 617–653.
- Minnikhanov, Damir [Дамир Минниханов] (15 March 2010). "История безумия" [History of madness] (in Russian). МедНовости [MedNews].
- Mishina, Irina [Ирина Мишина] (17 December 2012). "Раздвоение личностей: Почему преступников считают здоровыми, а общественных деятелей — законченными психами?" [Dual personalities: Why are criminals considered healthy, while public figures are considered complete madmen?]. Наша версия [Our Version] (in Russian).
- Mundt, Adrian; Frančišković, Tanja; Gurovich, Isaac; Heinz, Andreas; Ignatyev, Yuriy; Ismayilov, Fouad; Kalapos, Miklós Péter; Krasnov, Valery; Mihai, Adrian; Mir, Jan; Padruchny, Dzianis; Potočan, Matej; Raboch, Jiří; Taube, Māris; Welbel, Marta; Priebe, Stefan (8 June 2012). "Changes in the Provision of Institutionalized Mental Health Care in Post-Communist Countries". PLoS One. 7 (6) e38490. Bibcode:2012PLoSO...738490M. doi:10.1371/journal.pone.0038490. PMC 3371010. PMID 22715387.
- Murphy, Kim (30 May 2006). "Speak Out? Are You Crazy?". Los Angeles Times.
- Nasinnik, Oleg [Олег Насинник] (2009). "Оценка критерия «непосредственная опасность» в законодательствах Украины и других стран" [Evaluating the criterion of "a direct danger" in the legislations of Ukraine and other countries]. Архив психиатрии [Archive of Psychiatry] (in Russian). 15 (2): 31–37.
- Novozhilov, Eugene [Евгений Новожилов] (October 2013). "В России применяют казнь сумасшествием" [In Russia, execution by madness is applied]. Кругозор [Krugozor] (in Russian).
- Ovchinsky, Vladimir [Владимир Овчинский] (29 June 2010). "Российская психиатрия: чего изволите?" [Russian psychiatry: how may I serve you?]. Радио Свобода (in Russian). Radio Liberty.
- Polubinskaya, Svetlana (January 2000). "Reform in psychiatry in post-Soviet countries". Acta Psychiatrica Scandinavica. 101 (399): 106–108. doi:10.1111/j.0902-4441.2000.007s020[dash]24.x. PMID 10794040. Russian text: Polubinskaya, Svetlana [Светлана Полубинская] (2013). "От Союза ССР — к независимым государствам: Какой будет бывшая советская психиатрия?" [From the Union of Soviet Socialist Republics to independent countries: what will be the former Soviet psychiatry?]. Вестник Ассоциации психиатров Украины [The Herald of the Association of Psychiatrists of Ukraine] (in Russian) (2). Ассоциация психиатров Украины [The Association of Psychiatrists of Ukraine].
- Pshizov, Vladimir [Владимир Пшизов] (2006). "Психиатрия тронулась?" [Has psychiatry moved on?]. Альманах «Неволя» ["Bondage" Almanac] (in Russian) (6). Archived from the original on 26 December 2012.
- Reiter, Svetlana [Светлана Рейтер] (29 October 2013). "За чертой беспросветности" [Below the hopelessness line] (in Russian). Lenta.ru.
- Romek, Elena [Елена Ромек] (2002). "Психиатрия и права человека" [Psychiatry and human rights]. Психотерапия: теоретическое основание и социальное становление [Psychotherapy: Theoretical foundation and social formation] (in Russian). Rostov-on-Don: Издательство РГУ [The publishing house of the Rostov State University]. pp. 108–131. Archived 2009-06-01 at the Wayback Machine
- Sakharova, Olga; Gurovich, Isaak; Wahlbeck, Kristian (2007). Mental Health Care Indicators in Russia: A Study of the Availability of European Indicators for the MINDFUL Project (PDF). Helsinki: STAKES. p. 116. ISBN 978-951-33-2025-6.
- Savenko, Yuri [Юрий Савенко] (2009). "20-летие НПА России" [20th anniversary of the IPA of Russia]. Nezavisimiy Psikhiatricheskiy Zhurnal [The Independent Psychiatric Journal] (in Russian) (1): 5–18. ISSN 1028-8554.
- Savenko, Yuri [Юрий Савенко] (2007). "15-летие Закона о психиатрической помощи" [The 15-th anniversary of the Mental Health Law]. Nezavisimiy Psikhiatricheskiy Zhurnal [The Independent Psychiatric Journal] (in Russian) (3): 9–10.
- Savenko, Yuri [Юрий Савенко] (2012a). "20-летие Закона о психиатрической помощи" [The 20-th anniversary of the Mental Health Law]. Nezavisimiy Psikhiatricheskiy Zhurnal [The Independent Psychiatric Journal] (in Russian) (4): 6–7.
- Savenko, Yuri [Юрий Савенко] (2012b). "Об антипсихиатрических домыслах" [On antipsychiatric conjectures]. Альманах «Неволя» ["Bondage" Almanac] (in Russian) (28).
- Savenko, Yuri [Юрий Савенко] (2007b). "Дело Ларисы Арап или как можно поместить любого в психиатрическую лечебницу" [The case of Larisa Arap, or how anyone can be committed to a psychiatric hospital]. Nezavisimiy Psikhiatricheskiy Zhurnal [The Independent Psychiatric Journal] (in Russian) (3): 75–77.
- Savenko, Yuri [Юрий Савенко] (2004). "Тенденции в отношении к правам человека в области психического здоровья" [Trends in the attitude to human rights in the field of mental health]. In Novikova, A. [А. Новикова] (ed.). Права человека и психиатрия в Российской Федерации: Доклад по результатам мониторинга и тематические статьи [Human rights and psychiatry in the Russian Federation: Report on the results of monitoring and subject articles] (in Russian). Moscow: Moscow Helsinki Group. ISBN 5-98440-007-3.
- Savenko, Yuri; Mursalieva, Galina [Юрий Савенко, Галина Мурсалиева] (2007). "Дело Андрея Новикова. Психиатрию в политических целях использует власть, а не психиатры" [The case of Andrei Novikov. Psychiatry for political purposes is used by authority, not psychiatrists]. Nezavisimiy Psikhiatricheskiy Zhurnal [The Independent Psychiatric Journal] (in Russian) (4).
- Savenko, Yuri; Perekhov, Alexei (13 February 2014). "The State of Psychiatry in Russia". Psychiatric Times.
- Stewart, Will (26 April 2013). "Mentally ill patients 'tied to their beds' die in fire horror at Russian hospital". London Evening Standard. p. 31.
- Szasz, Thomas (2002). Liberation by Oppression. New Brunswick & London: Тransaction Publishers. ISBN 0-7658-0145-0.
- Szasz, Thomas [Томас Сас] (2006). "Освобождение посредством притеснения (фрагменты)" [Liberation by Oppression (fragments)]. Альманах «Неволя» ["Bondage" almanac] (in Russian). 6. Archived from the original on 2007-10-30.
- Szasz, Thomas (5 December 1977). "Soviet psychiatry: the historical background". Inquiry: 4–5.
- Szasz, Thomas (4 March 1978). "Psychiatry and dissent". The Spectator. 240 (7809): 12–13. PMID 11665013. Archived from the original on February 23, 2014.
- Soloviyova, Galina [Галина Соловьёва] (2008). "Что поддерживает карательную психиатрию" [What supports punitive psychiatry?]. Nezavisimiy Psikhiatricheskiy Zhurnal (2): 50–53.
- Suatbaev, Nikolay [Николай Суатбаев] (2006). "Психиатрия социальная или манипулятивная?" [Is psychiatry social or manipulative?]. Nezavisimiy Psikhiatricheskiy Zhurnal [The Independent Psychiatric Journal] (in Russian) (2).
- Usov, Grigori (2006). Fyodorova, Marina [Григорий Усов, Марина Фёдорова] (ed.). Правовое регулирование психиатрической помощи: учебное пособие [Legal regulation of psychiatric care: a training manual] (in Russian). Moscow: ЗАО Юстицинформ [Closed joint-stock company Justitsinform]. ISBN 5-7205-0717-5.
- Ustinov, A. [A. Устинов] (2012a). "К вопросу о законности правоприменительной практики в части порядка установления диспансерного наблюдения в отношении лиц, страдающих психическими расстройствами" [Towards the legality of the law enforcement practice as to the order for establishing dispensary supervision over persons with mental disorders]. Nezavisimiy Psikhiatricheskiy Zhurnal [The Independent Psychiatric Journal] (in Russian) (4): 57–61.
- Ustinov, A. [A. Устинов] (2012b). "Может ли быть ограничено право пациентов, находящихся в психиатрических стационарах, на ежедневную прогулку?" [Can the right of patients in psychiatric hospitals to a daily walk be restricted?]. Nezavisimiy Psikhiatricheskiy Zhurnal [The Independent Psychiatric Journal] (in Russian) (3): 48–49.
- Vinogradova, Lyubov [Любовь Виноградова] (2014). "Соблюдение прав человека в психиатрии" [Observing human rights in psychiatry]. In Kostenko, Nikolay [Николай Костенко] (ed.). Права человека в Российской Федерации: Доклад о событиях 2013 года [Human rights in the Russian Federation: Report on events of 2013] (PDF) (in Russian). Moscow: Moscow Helsinki Group. pp. 164–172.
- Vinogradova, Lyubov; Savenko, Yuri [Любовь Виноградова, Юрий Савенко] (2006). "Попытка выхолостить очередной демократический закон" [An attempt to dilute regular democratic law]. Альманах «Неволя» ["Bondage" Almanac] (in Russian) (6).
- Voltskaya, Tatyana [Татьяна Вольтская] (10 June 2014). "В "психушку" за детские шалости" [Sending to a psikhushka for children mischiefs]. Радио Свобода (in Russian). Radio Liberty.
- Voren, Robert van [Роберт ван Ворен] (2009). "История повторяется и в политической психиатрии" [History repeats itself in political psychiatry too]. Новости медицины и фармации [Medicine and Pharmacy News] (in Russian) (303). Издательский дом «Заславский» ["Zaslavsky" Publishing House].
- Voren, Robert van (2013). Psychiatry as a tool of coercion in post-Soviet countries (PDF). The European Parliament. doi:10.2861/28281. ISBN 978-92-823-4595-5. Russian text: Voren, Robert van [Роберт ван Ворен] (2013). "Психиатрия как средство репрессий в советских и постсоветских странах" [Psychiatry as a tool of coercion in post-Soviet countries]. Вестник Ассоциации психиатров Украины [The Herald of the Ukrainian Psychiatric Association] (in Russian) (5). The Ukrainian Psychiatric Association.
- Wilson, Andrew; Bachkatov, Nina (1992). Russia Revised: Alphabetical Key to the Soviet Debacle and the New Republics. Deutsch. ISBN 0-233-98783-5.

== See also ==
- Political abuse of psychiatry in Russia
