= Andreas Umland =

German political scientist (born 1967)

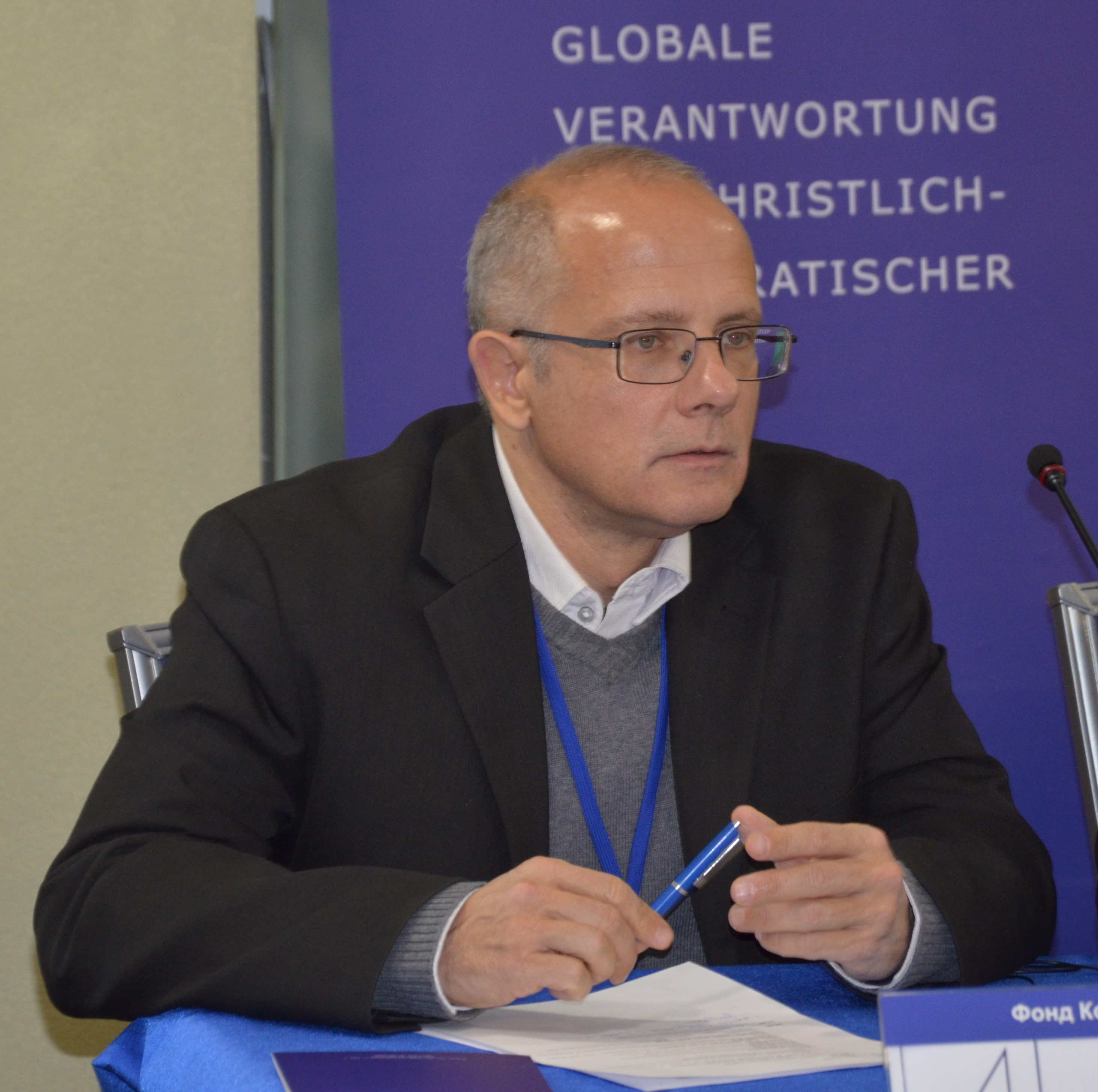
- Born: 1967 (age 58–59); Jena, East Germany
- Education: Leipzig University; Freie Universität Berlin; University of Cambridge
- Scientific career
- Fields: Political science
- Workplaces: National University of Kyiv-Mohyla Academy; Taras Shevchenko National University of Kyiv; Ural State University; Catholic University of Eichstätt-Ingolstadt

Andreas Umland (born 1967) is a German political scientist studying contemporary Russian and Ukrainian history as well as regime transitions. He has published on the post-Soviet extreme right, municipal decentralization, European fascism, post-communist higher education, East European geopolitics, Ukrainian and Russian nationalism, the Donbas and Crimea conflicts, as well as the neighborhood and enlargement policies of the European Union.

He is a Senior Expert at the Ukrainian Institute for the Future in Kyiv as well as a research fellow at the Swedish Institute for International Affairs in Stockholm. He lives in Kyiv, and teaches as an Associate Professor of Politics at the National University of Kyiv-Mohyla Academy. In 2005–2014, he was involved in the creation of a Master's program in German and European Studies administered jointly by the Kyiv-Mohyla Academy and Jena University.

== Career ==
In January–December 2004, he was a Temporary Lecturer in Russian and East European Studies, at the University of Oxford, and a Fellow of St. Antony's College Oxford.

Umland was a German Academic Exchange Service Lecturer at the Institute of International Relations of Kyiv Shevchenko University, in 2005–2008, as well as department of political science of the Kyiv-Mohyla Academy, in 2010–2014. In 2008–2010, Umland was a senior lecturer (Akademischer Rat) in Contemporary East European History at the Faculty of Historical and Social Studies at Catholic University of Eichstätt-Ingolstadt in Bavaria, and, in 2019–2021, an adjunct professor (Lehrbeauftragter) of Post-Soviet Affairs at the Institute of Political Science at the Friedrich Schiller University of Jena.

In 2014, he became a senior fellow at the Institute for Euro-Atlantic Cooperation in Kyiv, in 2019, a Nonresident Fellow at the Center for European Politics of the Institute of International Relations in Prague, and, in 2020, a Senior Expert at the Program for European, Regional and Russian Studies of the Ukrainian Institute for the Future in Kyiv as well as a Research Fellow at the Russia and Eurasia Program of the Swedish Institute of International Affairs in Stockholm.

As of January 2024 Umland is an analyst at the Stockholm Centre for Eastern European Studies, part of the Swedish Institute of International Affairs.

== Membership ==
- Board of Trustees of the Boris Nemtsov Academic Center for the Study of Russia at Prague;
- Board of Directors of COMFAS – The International Association for Comparative Fascist Studies in Budapest;
- Advisory Council of the NGO "Rights in Russia" in Somerset, UK;
- Board of Advisors of the Andrei Sakharov Research Center for Democratic Development in Kaunas;
- Circle of Friends of the German-Ukrainian Platform "Kyiv Dialogue" in Berlin;
- KomRex – The Center for Right-Wing Extremism Studies, Democracy Education and Social Integration in Jena;

== Editor ==
Umland has been the founder and general editor of the scholarly book series Soviet and Post-Soviet Politics and Society (est. in 2004) as well as founder and collector of the book series Ukrainian Voices (est. in 2019) published by ibidem-Verlag at Stuttgart / Hannover and distributed by Columbia University Press.

== Statements ==
Umland was the initiator and author of the text of an open letter of more than a hundred German-speaking experts on Eastern Europe dated 11 December 2014, in which the authors of the open letter of 60 German, mostly former politicians, which from pro-Russian positions called for "to prevent a new large-scale war in Europe". Umland's joint statement by a hundred experts and scholars, entitled "Protect Peace, Not Encourage Expansion," makes it clear that Russia is clearly acting as an aggressor in the Russo-Ukrainian war.

In 2015, Umland was among scholars from around the world who called on Ukrainian President Petro Poroshenko and Verkhovna Rada Speaker Volodymyr Groysman not to sign bills on the legal status and commemoration of Ukraine's independence fighters in the twentieth century (№2538-1) and "On the condemnation of the communist and National Socialist (Nazi) totalitarian regimes in Ukraine and the prohibition of propaganda of their symbols" (№2558).

In June 2018, Umland supported an open letter from cultural figures, politicians and human rights activists calling on world leaders to speak in defense of Ukrainian director Oleg Sentsov, a prisoner in Russia, and other political prisoners.

In September 2023, a year after the 2022 Nord Stream pipeline sabotage, Umland said that the operation was most likely carried out by Russia and that the yacht Andromeda which came under investigation for the sabotage was most likely a false flag by Russia to implicate Ukraine. Umland said that Russia may have attempted "to kill two birds with one stone" and not only avoid that Gazprom should pay compensation for undelivered gas, but also to threaten the support from allies to Ukraine in its defense against the Russian invasion of Ukraine. Having said that Russia had the strongest motives for the sabotage, he conversely said that Ukraine had no interest in sabotaging the already "dead" pipelines, since Ukraine had other priorities with a war in their country. Finally, Umland saw a pattern in Russia's behavior, because also after Russian-controlled forces had shot down Malaysia Airlines Flight 17 did Russia try to frame Ukraine for this crime.
