= Semyon Gluzman =

Ukrainian psychiatrist (1946–2026)

- Семeн Глузман
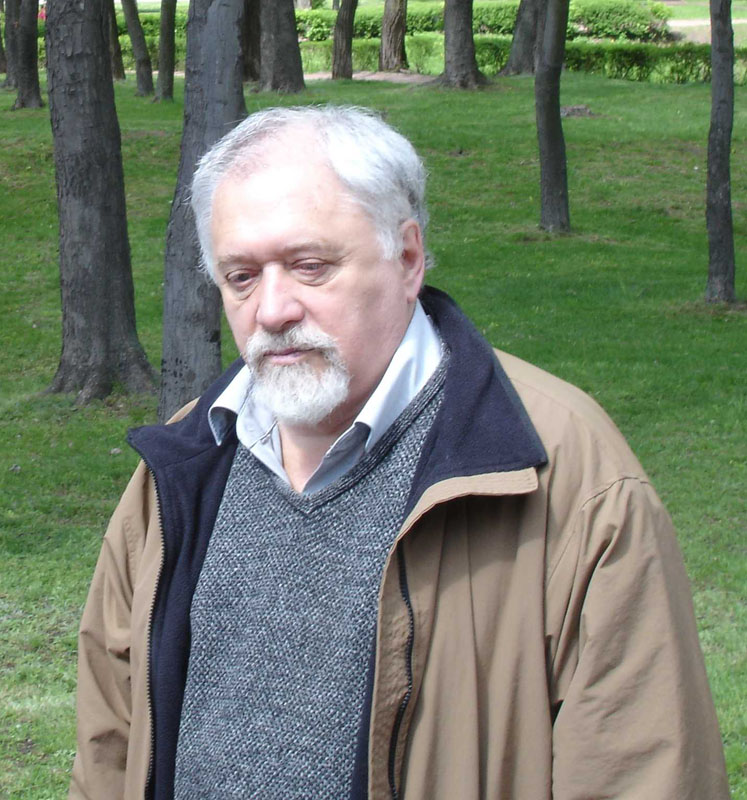
- Gluzman in 2012
- Born: 10 September 1946; Kyiv, Ukrainian SSR, Soviet Union
- Died: 16 February 2026 (aged 79)
- Citizenship: Soviet Union (1946–1991); Ukraine (1991–2026)
- Education: Kyiv Medical Institute
- Known for: Struggle against political abuse of psychiatry in the Soviet Union
- Awards: American Psychiatry Association; Distinguished fellowship; Royal College of Psychiatrists; Honorary membership; Geneva Prize for Human Rights in Psychiatry
- Scientific career
- Fields: Psychiatry
- Workplaces: Ukrainian Psychiatric Association

Semyon Fishelevich Gluzman (Russian: Семён Фишелевич Глузман; Ukrainian: Семен Фішельович Глузман, romanized: Semen Fishelovych Hluzman; 10 September 1946 – 16 February 2026) was a Ukrainian psychiatrist and human rights activist.

Gluzman was also the president and founder of the Ukrainian Psychiatric Association, founder of the American-Ukrainian Bureau for Human Rights, director of the International Medical Rehabilitation Center for the Victims of War and Totalitarian Regimes, and a member of the Council of Experts under the Ukraine's Ministry of Labor and Social Policy. He was co-chairperson of the Babi Yar Committee, and dissident and political prisoner. He held an M.D. qualification.

== Life and career ==
Gluzman was born in Kyiv on 10 September 1946 to a close-knit Jewish family. His father was doctor of medical sciences Fischel Gluzman (1904–1987). In 1968, he graduated from the Kyiv Medical Institute. After graduation, Gluzman started working in Ukrainian psychiatric hospitals and was offered a position at the Dnipropetrovsk Special Psychiatric Hospital in a city not far from the Black Sea.

He was the first psychiatrist in the Soviet Union to openly oppose Soviet abuse of psychiatry against dissenters. In 1971, Gluzman wrote an in-absentia psychiatric report on General Petro Hryhorenko, who spoke against the human rights abuses in the Soviet Union. Gluzman came to the conclusion that Hryhorenko was mentally sane and had been taken to mental hospitals for political reasons. In the late 1970s and early 1980s, Gluzman was forced to serve seven years in a labor camp and three years in Siberian exile for defending Hryhorenko against the charge of insanity. On 28 November 1977, Amnesty International added Gluzman to its list of 92 members of the medical profession who were imprisoned for their political beliefs. While in prison, Gluzman and fellow inmate Vladimir Bukovsky jointly wrote A Manual on Psychiatry for Dissidents, published in Russian, English, French, Italian, German, and Danish.

In the 1980s, Gluzman (who was Jewish) turned down offers to migrate to Israel by "people sent from American synagogues" and even Soviet officials.

In 1991, Gluzman founded the Ukrainian Psychiatric Association (UPA) as an independent mouthpiece and created a commission to address grievances about civil rights violations by mental health administrators.

In recognition of his courage and commitment to ethical psychiatry, Gluzman was given the title of a Distinguished Fellow of the American Psychiatry Association and the title of an Honorary Member of the Royal College of Psychiatrists in 1980.

In 2008, Gluzman was honored with the Geneva Prize for Human Rights in Psychiatry, presented to him at the XIV Congress of the World Psychiatric Association in Prague, for exceptional courage and adherence to ideals of humanism, for renunciation of using psychiatry against political dissidents as well as for dissemination of ethical principles during the reform of mental health service in Ukraine.

Gluzman coauthored many research papers covering psychiatry in Ukraine, the health consequences of the Chernobyl accident, their risk perceptions, suicidal ideation, heavy alcohol use, nicotine dependence, and intimate partner aggression.

Gluzman died on 16 February 2026, at the age of 79.

== Gluzman's publications ==
=== Books on Soviet psychiatry ===
- Gluzman, S. F.; Field, M. G.; Armes, K (1991). Soviet Psychiatry Today. Boston: Boston University, Institute for the Study of Conflict, Ideology and Policy.
- Gluzman, Semyon (1989). On Soviet totalitarian psychiatry. Amsterdam: International Association on the Political Use of Psychiatry. ISBN 90-72657-02-0.

=== Prose and poetry ===
- Gluzman, S. F. [Глузман С.Ф.] (2012). Рисунки по памяти, или воспоминания отсидента [Pictures drawn from memory, or the released dissident's memories]. Киев [Kyiv]: Издательский дом Дмитрия Бураго [Dmitry Burago's publishing house]. ISBN 978-966-489-121-6.
- Gluzman, S. F. [Глузман С.Ф.] (1994). Псалмы и скорби [Psalms and sorrows]. Харьков [Kharkiv]: Фолио [Folio]. ISBN 5-7150-0168-4.
- Маринович, Мирослав; Глузман, Семен; Антонюк, Зиновий (1997). Листи з волі [Letters from freedom] (in Ukrainian). Kyiv: Sfera. ISBN 978-966-7267-63-6.

=== Research papers in English without co-authors ===
- Gluzman, S. F. (May 2011). "The Chernobyl accident—a personal perspective". Clinical Oncology. 23 (4). Royal College of Radiologists, Great Britain: 306–307. doi:10.1016/j.clon.2011.01.504. PMID 21376548.
- Gluzman, S. F. (September 2001). "Law and psychiatry: the totalitarian experience". The Journal of the American Academy of Psychiatry and the Law. 29 (3): 330–335. PMID 11592462.
- Gluzman, S. F. (December 1991). "Abuse of psychiatry: analysis of the guilt of medical personnel". Journal of Medical Ethics. 17 (Supplement): 19–20. doi:10.1136/jme.17.Suppl.19. PMC 1378165. PMID 1795363.
- Gluzman, S. F. (16 September 1989). "World psychiatry and the Soviet Union". The Lancet. 334 (8664): 678–679. doi:10.1016/s0140-6736(89)90923-9. PMID 2570928. S2CID 31524248.
- Gluzman, S. F. (January 1982). "Fear of freedom: psychological decompensation or existentialist phenomenon?". The American Journal of Psychiatry. 139 (1): 57–61. doi:10.1176/ajp.139.1.57. ISSN 1535-7228. PMID 7055278.

=== Research papers in English with co-authors ===
- Adams, R. E.; Guey, L. T.; Gluzman, S. F.; Bromet, E. J. (November 2011). "Psychological well-being and risk perceptions of mothers in Kyiv, Ukraine, 19 years after the Chornobyl disaster". The International Journal of Social Psychiatry. 57 (6): 637–645. doi:10.1177/0020764011415204. PMID 21813484. S2CID 19452535.
- Adler, N.; Gluzman, S. F. (December 1993). "Soviet special psychiatric hospitals. Where the system was criminal and the inmates were sane". The British Journal of Psychiatry. 163 (6): 713–720. doi:10.1192/bjp.163.6.713. PMID 8306112. S2CID 44326786.
- Bromet, E. J.; Gluzman, S. F.; Paniotto, V. I.; Webb, C. P.; Tintle, N. L.; Zakhozha, V.; Havenaar, J. M.; Gutkovich, Z.; Kostyuchenko, S.; Schwartz, J. E. (September 2005). "Epidemiology of psychiatric and alcohol disorders in Ukraine: findings from the Ukraine World Mental Health survey". Social Psychiatry and Psychiatric Epidemiology. 40 (9): 681–690. doi:10.1007/s00127-005-0927-9. PMID 16160752. S2CID 25789445.
- Bromet, E. J.; Gluzman, S. F.; Schwartz, J. E.; Goldgaber, D. (August 2002). "Somatic symptoms in women 11 years after the Chornobyl accident: prevalence and risk factors". Environmental Health Perspectives. 110 (Suppl 4): 625–629. doi:10.1289/ehp.02110s4625. PMC 1241216. PMID 12194897.
- Bromet, E. J.; Goldgaber, D.; Carlson, G.; Panina, N.; Golovakha, E; Gluzman, S. F.; Gilbert, T.; Gluzman, D.; Lyubsky, S.; Schwartz, J. E. (June 2000). "Children's well-being 11 years after the Chornobyl catastrophe". Archives of General Psychiatry. 57 (6): 563–571. doi:10.1001/archpsyc.57.6.563. PMID 10839334.
- Bromet, E. J.; Guey, L. T.; Taormina, D. P.; Carlson, G. A.; Havenaar, J. M.; Kotov, R.; Gluzman, S. F. (May 2011). "Growing up in the shadow of Chornobyl: adolescents' risk perceptions and mental health". Social Psychiatry and Psychiatric Epidemiology. 46 (5): 393–402. doi:10.1007/s00127-010-0203-5. PMID 20221882. S2CID 11705737.
- Bromet, E. J.; Havenaar, J. M.; Gluzman, S. F.; Tintle, N. L. (September 2005). "Psychological aftermath of the Lviv air show disaster: a prospective controlled study". Acta Psychiatrica Scandinavica. 112 (3): 194–200. doi:10.1111/j.1600-0447.2005.00566.x. PMID 16095474. S2CID 42598.
- Bromet, E. J.; Havenaar, J. M.; Tintle, N.; Kostyuchenko, S.; Kotov, R.; Gluzman, S. F. (June 2007). "Suicide ideation, plans and attempts in Ukraine: findings from the Ukraine World Mental Health Survey". Psychological Medicine. 37 (6): 807–819. doi:10.1017/S0033291707009981. PMID 17288636. S2CID 27727664.
- Bromet, E. J.; Taormina, D. P.; Guey, L. T.; Bijlsma, J. A.; Gluzman, S. F.; Havenaar, J. M.; Carlson, H.; Carlson, G. A. (November 2009). "Subjective health legacy of the Chornobyl accident: a comparative study of 19-year-olds in Kyiv". BMC Public Health. 9: 1417. doi:10.1186/1471-2458-9-417. PMC 2784776. PMID 19919706.
- Gluzman, S. F.; Kostyuchenko, S. (April 2006). "Psychiatry in Ukraine". International Psychiatry. 3 (2): 38–40. doi:10.1192/S1749367600001600. ISSN 1749-3684. PMC 6734690. PMID 31507842.
- Guey, L. T.; Bromet, E. J.; Gluzman, S. F.; Zakhozha, V.; Paniotto, V. (May 2008). "Determinants of participation in a longitudinal two-stage study of the health consequences of the Chornobyl nuclear power plant accident". BMC Medical Research Methodology. 8 (1): 27. doi:10.1186/1471-2288-8-27. PMC 2396662. PMID 18466621.
- Litcher, L.; Bromet, E. J.; Carlson, G.; Gilbert, T.; Panina, N.; Golovakha, E; Goldgaber, D.; Gluzman, S. F.; et al. (April 2001). "Ukrainian application of the Children's Somatization Inventory: psychometric properties and associations with internalizing symptoms". Journal of Abnormal Child Psychology. 29 (2): 165–175. doi:10.1023/A:1005240214564. ISSN 1573-2835. PMID 11321631. S2CID 22543983.
- Litcher, L.; Bromet, E. J.; Carlson, G.; Squires, N.; Goldgaber, D.; Panina, N.; Golovakha, E; Gluzman, S. F. (March 2000). "School and neuropsychological performance of evacuated children in Kyiv 11 years after the Chornobyl disaster". Journal of Child Psychology and Psychiatry. 41 (3): 291–299. doi:10.1111/1469-7610.00613. PMID 10784076.
- Nock, M. K.; Borges, G.; Bromet, E. J.; Alonso, J.; Angermeyer, M; Beautrais, A; Bruffaerts, R.; Chiu, W. T.; de Girolamo, G.; Gluzman, S. F.; de Graaf, R.; Gureje, O.; Haro, J. M.; Huang, Y.; Karam, E; Kessler, R. C.; Lepine, J. P.; Levinson, D.; Medina-Mora, M. E.; Ono, Y.; Posada-Villa, J.; Williams, D. (February 2008). "Cross-national prevalence and risk factors for suicidal ideation, plans and attempts". The British Journal of Psychiatry. 192 (2): 98–105. doi:10.1192/bjp.bp.107.040113. PMC 2259024. PMID 18245022.
- O'Leary, K. D.; Tintle, N. L.; Bromet, E. J.; Gluzman, S. F. (August 2008). "Descriptive epidemiology of intimate partner aggression in Ukraine". Social Psychiatry and Psychiatric Epidemiology. 43 (8): 619–626. doi:10.1007/s00127-008-0339-8. PMID 18360731. S2CID 25090550.
- Ougrin, Dennis; Gluzman, Semyon; Dratcu, Luiz (December 2006). "Psychiatry in post-communist Ukraine: dismantling the past, paving the way for the future". The Psychiatrist. 30 (12): 456–459. doi:10.1192/pb.30.12.456.
- Taormina, D. P.; Rozenblatt, S.; Guey, L. T.; Gluzman, S. F.; Carlson, G. A.; Havenaar, J. M.; Zakhozha, V.; Kotov, R.; et al. (April 2008). "The Chornobyl accident and cognitive functioning: a follow-up study of infant evacuees at age 19 years". Psychological Medicine. 38 (4): 489–497. doi:10.1017/S0033291707002462. PMID 18177528. S2CID 23103308.
- Webb, C. P.; Bromet, E. J.; Gluzman, S. F.; Tintle, N. L.; Schwartz, J. E.; Kostyuchenko, S.; Havenaar, J. M. (July–August 2005). "Epidemiology of heavy alcohol use in Ukraine: findings from the world mental health survey". Alcohol and Alcoholism. 40 (4): 327–335. doi:10.1093/alcalc/agh152. PMID 15824065.
- Webb, C. P.; Bromet, E. J.; Tintle, N. L.; Schwartz, J. E.; Gluzman, S. F.; Kostyuchenko, S.; Havenaar, J. M. (September 2007). "Smoking initiation and nicotine dependence symptoms in Ukraine: findings from the Ukraine World Mental Health survey". Public Health. 121 (9): 663–672. doi:10.1016/j.puhe.2006.11.017. PMC 2793595. PMID 17544466.

=== Research papers in Russian without co-authors ===
- Gluzman, Semyon [Семён Глузман] (2013a). История психиатрических репрессий [The history of psychiatric repression]. Вестник Ассоциации психиатров Украины [The Herald of the Ukrainian Psychiatric Association] (in Russian) (2). The Ukrainian Psychiatric Association.
- Gluzman, Semyon [Семён Глузман] (2013b). Психиатрия: Что делать? [Psychiatry: What to do?]. Новости медицины и фармации [Medicine and Pharmacy News] (in Russian). 14 (465). Издательский дом «Заславский» ["Zaslavsky" Publishing House].
- Gluzman, Semyon [Семён Глузман] (2013c). Снежневский [Snezhnevsky]. Вестник Ассоциации психиатров Украины [The Herald of the Ukrainian Psychiatric Association] (in Russian) (6). The Ukrainian Psychiatric Association: 79–80.
- Gluzman, Semyon [Семён Глузман] (2013d). Чья смирительная рубашка? [Whose straitjacket is it?]. Новости медицины и фармации [Medicine and Pharmacy News] (in Russian). 7 (455). Издательский дом «Заславский» ["Zaslavsky" Publishing House].
- Gluzman, Semyon [Семён Глузман] (2012a). Как я писал закон для СССР [How I wrote the Law for the USSR]. Вестник Ассоциации психиатров Украины [The Herald of the Ukrainian Psychiatric Association] (in Russian) (1). The Ukrainian Psychiatric Association.
- Gluzman, Semyon [Семён Глузман] (2012b). Так появился украинский закон [In that way the Ukrainian Law appeared]. Вестник Ассоциации психиатров Украины [The Herald of the Ukrainian Psychiatric Association] (in Russian) (2). The Ukrainian Psychiatric Association.
- Gluzman, Semyon [Семён Глузман] (2011). Это было в Афинах… [It was in Athens…]. Новости медицины и фармации [Medicine and Pharmacy News] (in Russian) (383). Издательский дом «Заславский» ["Zaslavsky" Publishing House].
- Gluzman, Semyon [Семён Глузман] (January 2010). Этиология злоупотреблений в психиатрии: попытка мультидисциплинарного анализа [The etiology of abuses in psychiatry: an attempt at multidisciplinary analysis]. Нейроnews: Психоневрология и нейропсихиатрия [Neuronews: Psychoneurology and Neuropsychiatry] (in Russian). 1 (20). Archived from the original on 17 November 2015. The paper was also published in: Gluzman, Semyon [Семён Глузман] (2009). Этиология психиатрических злоупотреблений: попытка мультидисциплинарного анализа [The etiology of psychiatric abuses: an attempt at multidisciplinary analysis]. Новости медицины и фармации [Medicine and Pharmacy News] (in Russian). 20 (300): 18–19.
- Gluzman, Semyon [Семён Глузман] (2009). Украинское лицо судебной психиатрии [The Ukrainian face of forensic psychiatry]. Новости медицины и фармации [Medicine and Pharmacy News] (in Russian). 15 (289).
- Gluzman, Semyon [Семён Глузман] (1992). Страх свободы: декомпенсация психического состояния или феномен существования? [Fear of freedom: psychological decompensation or existentialist phenomenon?]. Обозрение психиатрии и медицинской психологии имени В.М. Бехтерева (in Russian) (4): 11–18. ISSN 0762-7475.
- Gluzman, Semyon [Семён Глузман] (1990). Злоупотребление психиатрией: социальные и юридические истоки [Abuse of psychiatry: the social and legal origins]. Философская и социологическая мысль [The Philosophical and Sociological Thought] (in Russian) (7). Наукова думка, Інститут філософіï (Академія наук Украïнськоï РСР) [The Scientific Thought, the Institute of Philosophy (the Academy of Sciences of the Ukrainian Soviet Socialist Republic)]: 66. ISSN 0235-3512.

=== Research papers in Russian with co-authors ===
- Adler, N [Адлер Н.]; Gluzman, SF [Глузман С.Ф.] (1992). Пытка психиатрией. Механизм и последствия [Torture by psychiatry. Mechanism and consequences]. Обозрение психиатрии и медицинской психологии имени В.М. Бехтерева (in Russian) (3): 138–152. ISSN 0762-7475. The paper was also published in Adler, N [Адлер Н.]; Gluzman, SF [Глузман С.Ф.] (2001). Пытка психиатрией. Механизм и последствия [Torture by psychiatry. Mechanism and consequences] (PDF). Социально-психологические и медицинские аспекты жестокости [Social, Psychological and Medical Aspects of Cruelty] (in Russian) (1): 118–135.
- Gluzman, SF [Глузман С.Ф.]; Golovakha, EI [Головаха Е.И.]; Panina, NV [Панина Н.В.] (1992). Мнения и оценки врачей-психиатров Украины по актуальным вопросам психиатрической службы [Opinions and estimates by psychiatrists of Ukraine on topical issues of mental health service]. Обозрение психиатрии и медицинской психологии имени В.М. Бехтерева (in Russian) (2): 41–50. ISSN 0762-7475.
- Gluzman, SF [Глузман С.Ф.]; Kuznetsov, VN [Кузнецов В.Н.]; Poltavets, VI [Полтавец В.И.]; Korotenko, AI [Коротенко А.И.]; Nasinnik, OA [Насинник О.А.]; Chernyavsky, VM [Чернявский В.М.]; Polubinskaya, SV [Полубинская С.В.] (1998). Модель системы информирования и планирования лечения для Украины: заключительный отчёт [The model of system of informing and planning the treatment for Ukraine: the final report]. Вісник асоціації психіатрів України [The Herald of the Association of Psychiatrists of Ukraine] (in Russian) (3): 10–25.

=== Research papers in Ukrainian ===
- Moiseenko, RO [Моісеєнко Р.О.]; Tereshchenko, OV [Терещенко О.В.]; Martsenkovsky, IA [Марценковський І.А.]; Gluzman, SF [Глузман С.Ф.]; Pinchuk, IY [Пінчук І.Я.]; Yurchenko, TV [Юрченко Т.В.]; Dolenko, OV [Доленко О.В.] (2012). Напрямки реформування системи охорони психічного здоров'я дітей і підлітків в Україні [Directions of reforming the system of protection of mental health of children and adolescents in Ukraine]. Український вісник психоневрології [The Ukrainian Herald of Psychoneurology] (in Ukrainian). 20 (1 (70) додаток [supplement]).

=== Articles, reports, interviews, chapters in books ===
- Gluzman, Semyon (2012). "A personal testament". In Dudley, Michael; Silove, Derrick; Gale, Fran (eds.). Mental Health and Human Rights: Vision, Praxis, and Courage. Oxford University Press. pp. xxv–xxvii. ISBN 978-0-19-921396-2.
- "Gluzman's cabinet with the list of his essays accessible to the public". LB.ua. Archived from the original on 4 January 2014.
- Gluzman, SF [Глузман С.Ф.] (2010). Расширенная судебно-психиатрическая заочная экспертиза по делу Григоренко Петра Григорьевича, 1907 г.р., украинца, жителя г. Москвы (восстановлено на основании копии Самиздата) [A comprehensive in absentia psychiatric opinion on the case of Grigorenko Pyotr Grigoryevich, b. 1907, a Ukrainian, Moscow resident (restored on the basis of a Samizdat copy)]. Новости медицины и фармации [Medicine and Pharmacy News] (in Russian). No. 329.
- Глузман, Семён (2010). "Мнение по поводу статьи "Отчет целевой группы ВПА по "перекачке" мозгов"". Новости медицины и фармации (329).
- Глузман, Семён (2010). "Об одной коллизии в праве". Новости медицины и фармации (329).
- Gluzman, Semyon. "The smell of hatred". East European Monitor, issue 5.
- "Семен Глузман: "Нам необходима социальная психиатрия"". Журнал «Пенсія» (60). October 2008.
- "В Украине слишком много психбольниц: пресс-конференция С.Глузмана". Украинское информационное агентство Новости. 4 October 2008.
- Шарий, Анатолий. "Беседы с Глузманом, ч.1. Диссидент". from-ua.com.
- Шарий, Анатолий. "Беседы с Глузманом, ч. 2. Срок". from-ua.com.
- Шарий, Анатолий. "Беседы с Глузманом, ч. 3. Предательство". from-ua.com.
- Глузман, Семён (6 December 2012). "Семен Глузман: У мене відчуття, що Янукович, як не дивно, слабка людина". ТВі, Вечір з Миколою Княжицьким. Archived from the original on 10 December 2012.
