= Fredrik Löjdquist =

Swedish diplomat

Björn Fredrik Hugo Löjquist, born 15 March 1967 in Uppsala, Sweden, is a Swedish diplomat and ambassador.

== Biography ==
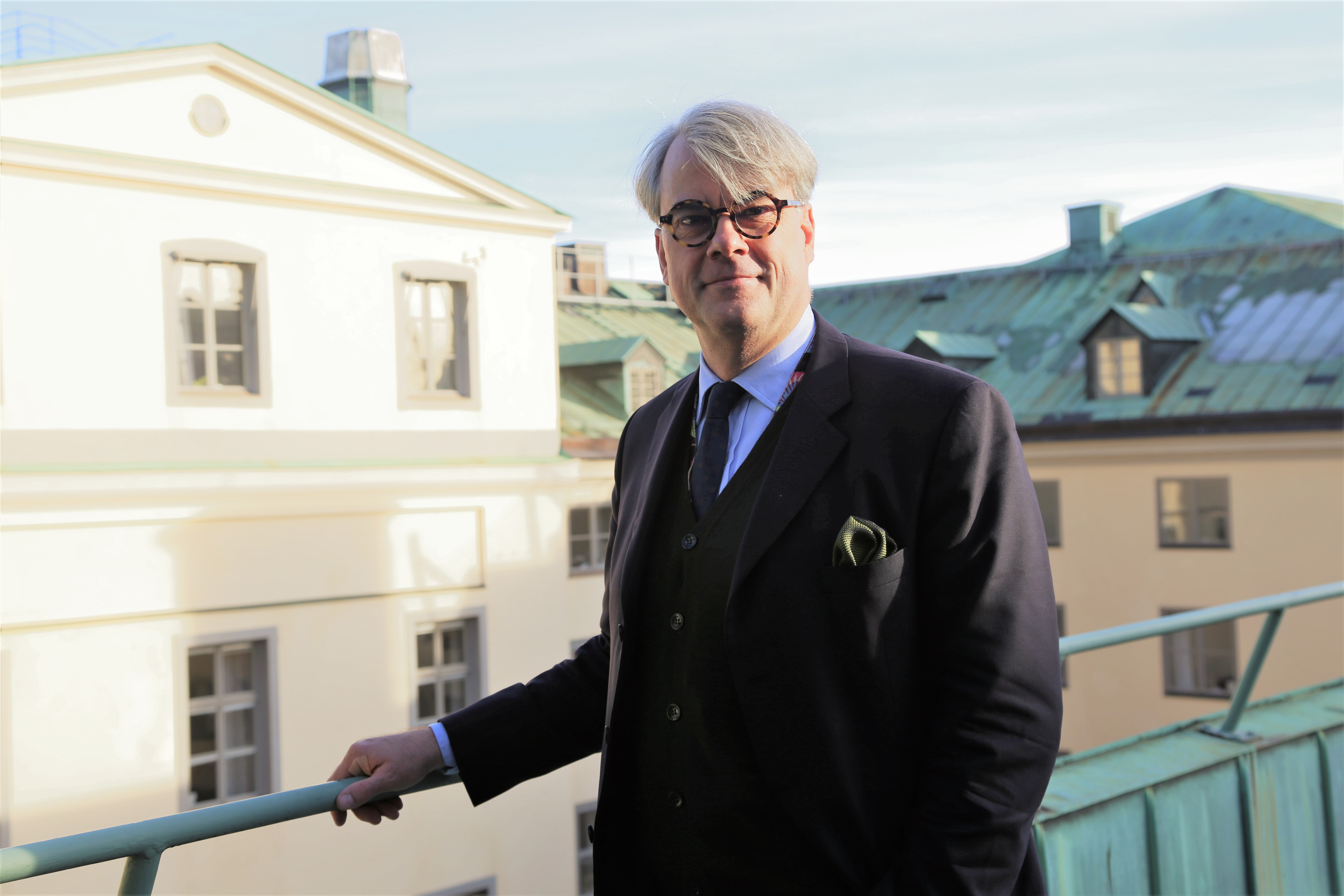
Fredrik Löjdquist

Löjdquist holds a bachelor's degree in political science from Uppsala university and a master's degree in political theory from the London School of Economics and Political Science. He was admitted to the Swedish Ministry of Foreign Affairs' diplomatic training programme in 1994.

Löjdquist has served at the Swedish diplomatic missions to Vilnius, Moscow and Vienna, and as a Special Envoy and Ambassador for the Swedish Presidency of the Council of the European Union in 2009 in Tbilisi, Georgia.

In 2012, Löjdquist was appointed Sweden's ambassador to the Organization for Security and Cooperation in Europe (OSCE), a position he held until August 2017. In September 2018 he was appointed Sweden's first ambassador and special envoy for countering hybrid threats at the Swedish Ministry for Foreign Affairs. In 2021, Löjdquist was appointed director of the newly established Stockholm Centre for Eastern European Studies (SCEEUS), based at the Swedish Institute for Foreign Affairs.

Löjdquist is a member of the Royal Swedish Academy of War Sciences and a member of International Centre for Defence and Security (ICDS) international advisory board. He is also a member of the S. Fischer Stiftung advisory board.

In June 2024, Löjdquist was awarded the H.M The King's Medal (12th size) with the Order of the Seraphim ribbon, for "outstanding contributions in the Swedish foreign service and the European security policy.
