= Utrikespolitiska institutet =

Utrikespolitiska institutet is the Swedish name for two organizations:

- Swedish Institute of International Affairs
- Finnish Institute of International Affairs
