= Robert van Voren =

Dutch activist and political scientist

- Johannes Bax
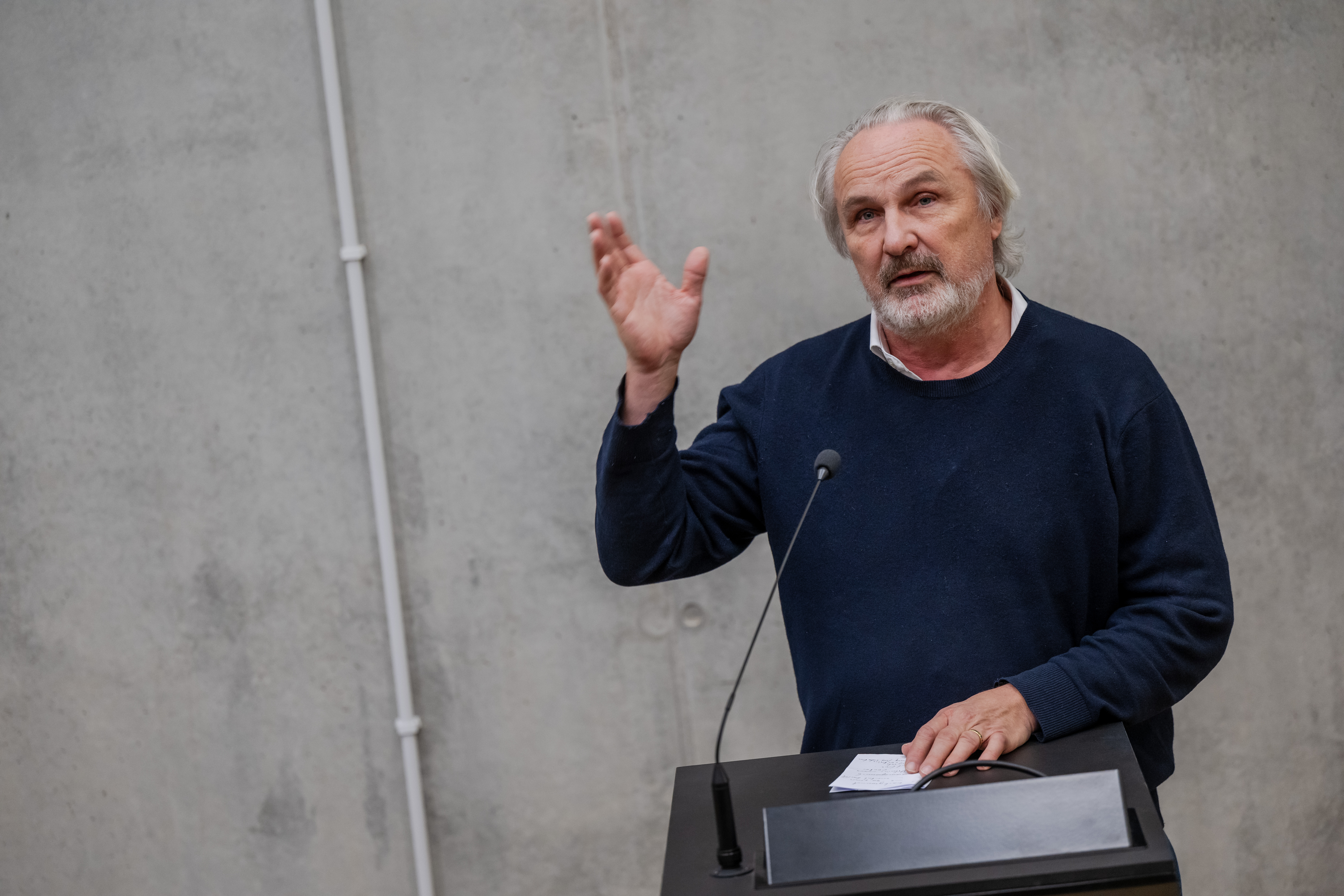
- Robert van Voren in 2024
- Born: July 25, 1959 (age 67); Montreal, Quebec, Canada
- Citizenship: Canada, Netherlands, Lithuania
- Education: Amsterdam University
- Known for: his Russian studies, human rights activism and participation in struggle against political abuse of psychiatry in the Soviet Union
- Awards: from Queen Beatrix of the Netherlands (2005) for his work as a human rights activist; Knight's Cross of the Order of the Lithuanian Grand Duke Gediminas (2025); Pardes Humanitarian Prize in Mental Health, 2022. Officer of the Order Pro Merito Militensi (Maltese Order), 2026
- Scientific career
- Fields: political science, psychiatry
- Workplaces: Global Initiative on Psychiatry, Hilversum, Netherlands; Ilia State University, Tbilisi, Georgia; Vytautas Magnus University, Kaunas, Lithuania; Royal College of Psychiatrists, London, Britain; Ukrainian Psychiatric Association, Kyiv, Ukraine
- Website: robertvanvoren.com

Robert van Voren (publishing pseudonym of Johannes Baks, Dutch: Johannes Bax, Lithuanian: Johannesas Baksas, born 25 July 1959, Montreal, Quebec, Canada) is a Dutch human rights activist, sovietologist and historian.

He is a professor of Soviet and post-Soviet studies in the Ilia State University in Tbilisi (Georgia) and in the Vytautas Magnus University in Kaunas (Lithuania) as well as a visiting professor at University of Silezia, Katowice, Poland. He is also Chief Executive of the international foundation Human Rights in Mental Health-Federation Global Initiative on Psychiatry and Executive Director of the Andrei Sakharov Research Center for Democratic Development at Vytautas Magnus University in Kaunas, Lithuania.

== Education ==
Graduated from the Marnix Gymnasium in Rotterdam in 1979, and in 1986 achieved a master's degree at the University of Amsterdam in Modern and Theoretical History with a specialization in Soviet History with Russian language. Robert van Voren defended his PhD in Political Sciences at Kaunas Vytautas Magnus University in October, 2010.

== Career ==
From 1978 to 1987, Robert van Voren worked as a Secretary of the Podrabniek Fund in The Netherlands. 1978-1989 he was an Associate of the Bukovsky Foundation in Amsterdam, where he also became a Board Member in 1988-1989.

He was a founding member of the International Association on the Political Abuse of Psychiatry (IAPUP) in 1980.

Since 1980, he also travelled frequently to the USSR to meet with dissidents and relatives of political prisoners. On average, he would make four trips per year. The goal was to deliver humanitarian aid, collect evidence on human rights violations and smuggle samizdat out of the country. He was arrested in 1983, but still managed to continue traveling to the USSR until its disintegration.

Since 1986, Robert van Voren has been the Secretary-General of the International Association on the Political Use of Psychiatry (renamed in 1991 into Geneva Initiative on Psychiatry, in 2005 into the Global Initiative on Psychiatry, and to Human Rights in Mental Health-FGIP in 2014).

Between 1991 and 1997, he worked as a Coordinator of Western Aid to Psychiatry of the Ukrainian Ministry of Health, and in during 1994-1997 he was the Permanent Representative of Ukraine in the Benelux for Humanitarian Affairs. Since 1994, Robert van Voren has been the Board Member of the Kyiv Rehabilitation Center for Victims of Totalitarianism and Civil War. In 1994, he also founded the Ukrainian Information Center in the Netherlands, where he also became a Board Member from 1997 to 1998.

1996-1997 he was also a Board Member of the Second World Center. From 1996 to 1999 he was among the members of the Committee on Mental Health of the Netherlands International Health Platform.

Between 1996 and 2010 he also worked as a Secretary/Treasurer of the publishing house "Sphere" in Kyiv, Ukraine.

Since 2010, Robert van Voren is the Patron of the Gladys School for Community Health Work and Development in the Gampaha District, Sri Lanka.

From 2011 to 2013, he was the Chairman of the Board of the Themis Foundation for Prison Reform, and from 2013 to 2017 he was the Director there.

Between 2013 and 2015, he was a Member of the Board of the Netwerk International Mental Health in The Netherlands as well as the Vice-President for Europe at the World Federation for Mental Health.

Robert van Voren has been a Member of the Board of Advisors of the Charity "Rights in Russia" in the United Kingdom since 2013. Since 2014, he has been the Chairman of the Board of the "Foundation to Preserve History of Maidan" in Kyiv, and since 2015 - a Patron of the BEARR Trust, United Kingdom.

From 2015 to 2017, Robert van Voren was the Vice President of the World Federation for Mental Health (WFMH) for constituency development, and the Chairman of the Human Rights and Ethics Committee of the WFMH. From 2017 to 2020, he was in the board of the World Federation for Mental Health, and since 2016, he has been on the board of the Penal Reform International (PRI) in the United Kingdom.

In addition, Robert van Voren has been active in academic field – as a professor, as a publishing scientist, and as a manager of different academic departments in various universities. He is the Executive Director of the Andrei Sakharov Research Center for Democratic Development at Vytautas Magnus University.

In 2022, Robert van Voren was awarded the Pardes Humanitarian Prize in Mental Health.

== Sources ==
- "Is there a resumption of political psychiatry in the former Soviet Union?". Royal College of Psychiatrists. 3 August 2014.
- Boersema, Wendelmoet (18 January 2001). "Johannes Bax heet eindelijk Van Voren" [Johannes Baks is finally called Van Voren]. Trouw (in Dutch).
- Clark, Fiona (11 January 2014). "Is psychiatry being used for political repression in Russia?". The Lancet. 383 (9912): 114–115. doi:10.1016/S0140-6736(13)62706-3. PMID 24422214.
- Dobryanskaya, Mariya [Мария Добрянская] (January 2010). "Роберт ван Ворен: «Финансовые потоки нужно направлять на создание европейской модели психиатрии…»" [Robert van Voren:"Financial flows must be directed at creating European model of psychiatry…"]. НейроNews: Психоневрология и психиатрия [NeuroNews: Psychoneurology and Psychiatry] (in Russian). 1 (20).
- Donskis, Leonidas (2009). A Litmus test case of modernity: examining modern sensibilities and the public domain in the Baltic States at the turn of the century. Peter Lang. p. 314. ISBN 978-3-0343-0335-4.
- "Freedom for another Soviet dissident". The Glasgow Herald. No. 20. 18 February 1987. p. 1.
- Gordon, Harvey (31 July 2006). "Reform of forensic psychiatry in the former Soviet Union". The Psychiatrist. 30 (8): 313. doi:10.1192/pb.30.8.313.
- James, George (19 October 1985). "Soviet dissident told to leave". The New York Times.
- Keukens, Rob; Voren, Robert van (2007). "Coercion in psychiatry: still an instrument of political misuse?". BMC Psychiatry. 7 (Suppl 1): S4. doi:10.1186/1471-244X-7-S1-S4. PMC 3332857.
- Lavrinenko, Inga [Инга Лавриненко] (18 February 2015). "Эта война — только первый шаг, следующая война будет внутри России, которая начнет распадаться — голландский политолог" [This war is only the first step, the next war will be in Russia which will start to disintegrate, says Dutch political scientist] (in Russian). Ракурс [Rakurs]. Archived from the original on 23 February 2015.
- Leygraf, Vrolg (27 June 2010). "Ist die nachträgliche Sicherungsverwahrung am Ende?" [Is compulsory hospitalization unprofitable in the end?]. Der Nervenarzt [The Neurologist] (in German). 81 (7): 867–872. doi:10.1007/s00115-010-3046-0. PMID 20582397.
- Lumans, Valdis (July 2014). "Robert van Voren, Undigested Past: The Holocaust in Lithuania". European History Quarterly. 44 (3): 586–588. doi:10.1177/0265691414537193au.
- Makhashvili, Nino; Voren, Robert van (8 January 2013). "Balancing community and hospital care: a case study of reforming mental health services in Georgia". PLOS Medicine. 10 (1) e1001366. doi:10.1371/journal.pmed.1001366. PMC 3539945. PMID 23319895.
- Moran, Mark (5 November 2010). "Psychiatric abuses once led to Cold War confrontation". Psychiatric News. 45 (21): 6. doi:10.1176/pn.45.21.psychnews_45_21_009.
- Myagkova, N. [Н. Мягкова] (2012). "Украинская психиатрия: уроки прошлого и настоящего" [Ukrainian psychiatry: the lessons of the past and present]. Вестник Ассоциации психиатров Украины [The Herald of the Ukrainian Psychiatric Association] (in Russian) (2). The Ukrainian Psychiatric Association.
- Mykoliuk, Oksana (6 February 2013). "Punitive psychiatry in the USSR. Book by Dutch human rights champion tells about cruel treatment of dissidents in the 1970s-1980s". The Day newspaper. No. 8.
- Rogers, Paul; Keukens, Rob; Voren, Robert van (February 2006). "Reforming the delivery of forensic mental health and prison mental health in the Republic of Georgia". Mental Health Practice. 9 (5): 38–40. doi:10.7748/mhp.9.5.38.s32.
- Skorokhod, Olga [Ольга Скороход] (1 February 2013). "Голландский канадец спасал советских диссидентов из психушки" [Canadian of Dutch origin saved Soviet dissidents from psikhushka]. Gazeta.ua (in Russian).
- Targum, Steven; Chaban, Oleh; Mykhnyak, Serhiy (April 2013). "Psychiatry in the Ukraine". Innovations in Clinical Neuroscience. 10 (4): 41–46. PMC 3659038. PMID 23696959.
- Tomov, Toma; Voren, Robert van; Keukens, Rob; Puras, Dainius (2006). "Mental health policy in former eastern bloc countries". In Knapp, Martin; McDaid, David; Mossialos, Elias (eds.). Mental health policy and practice across Europe. McGraw-Hill Education. pp. 397–425. ISBN 0-335-21467-3.
- Voren, Robert van (1 September 1992). "Appeal to Western psychiatrists". The Psychiatrist. 16 (9): 590. doi:10.1192/pb.16.9.590.
- Voren, Robert van; Whiteford, Henery (Spring 2000). "Reform of mental health in Eastern Europe" (PDF). Eurohealth. 6 (2, special issue): 63–65. Archived (PDF) from the original on 26 April 2013.
- Voren, Robert van (2002a). "Comparing Soviet and Chinese political psychiatry" (PDF). The Journal of the American Academy of Psychiatry and the Law. 30 (1): 131–135. PMID 11931361. Archived from the original (PDF) on 2011-07-26.
- Voren, Robert van (1 December 2002b). "The WPA World Congress in Yokohama and the issue of political abuse of psychiatry in China". The Psychiatrist. 26 (12): 441–442. doi:10.1192/pb.26.12.441.
- Voren, Robert van (31 March 2006). "Reforming forensic psychiatry and prison mental health in the former Soviet Union". The Psychiatrist. 30 (4): 124–126. doi:10.1192/pb.30.4.124.
- Voren, Robert van [Роберт ван Ворен] (2009a). "История повторяется и в политической психиатрии" [History repeats itself in political psychiatry too]. Новости медицины и фармации [Medicine and Pharmacy News] (in Russian) (303). Издательский дом «Заславский» ["Zaslavsky" Publishing House].
- Voren, Robert van (January 2010a). "Political abuse of psychiatry—an historical overview" (PDF). Schizophrenia Bulletin. 36 (1): 33–35. doi:10.1093/schbul/sbp119. PMC 2800147. PMID 19892821. Archived from the original (PDF) on 2011-07-26.
- Voren, Robert van (2010b). "Abuse of psychiatry for political purposes in the USSR: a case-study and personal account of the efforts to bring them to an end". In Helmchen, Hanfried; Sartorius, Norman (eds.). Ethics in psychiatry: European contributions. International library of ethics, law, and the new medicine. Vol. 45. Vol. 45. Springer Netherlands. pp. 489–507. doi:10.1007/978-90-481-8721-8_29. ISBN 978-90-481-8720-1.
- Voren, Robert van [Роберт ван Ворен] (2013a). "От политических злоупотреблений психиатрией к реформе психиатрической службы" [From political abuses of psychiatry to the reform of psychiatric service]. Вестник Ассоциации психиатров Украины [The Herald of the Ukrainian Psychiatric Association] (in Russian) (2). The Ukrainian Psychiatric Association.
- Voren, Robert van (2013b). Psychiatry as a tool of coercion in post-Soviet countries (PDF). The European Parliament. doi:10.2861/28281. ISBN 978-92-823-4595-5.
- Voren, Robert van [Роберт ван Ворен] (2013c). "Психиатрия как средство репрессий в советских и постсоветских странах" [Psychiatry as a tool of coercion in post-Soviet countries]. Вестник Ассоциации психиатров Украины [The Herald of the Ukrainian Psychiatric Association] (in Russian) (5). The Ukrainian Psychiatric Association.
- Voren, Robert van (August 2014). "Is there a resumption of political psychiatry in the former Soviet Union?" (PDF). International Psychiatry. 11 (3): 73–74. doi:10.1192/S1749367600004550. PMC 6735153. PMID 31507769. Archived (PDF) from the original on 5 September 2014.
- Voren, Robert van (January–March 2015a). "Fifty years of political abuse of psychiatry – no end in sight". Ethics, Medicine and Public Health. 1 (1): 44–51. doi:10.1016/j.jemep.2014.12.001.
- Voren, Robert van (30 April 2015b). "Ending political abuse of psychiatry: where we are at and what needs to be done". Psychiatric Bulletin. 40 (1): 30–33. doi:10.1192/pb.bp.114.049494. PMC 4768845. PMID 26958357.
- "Prof. van Voren discussed maidan events". VDU. Vytautas Magnus University. 16 May 2014.
- Voren, Robert van (10 October 2015c). "Путин спровоцировал мировой конфликт" [Putin provoked a world conflict]. Новое Время [New Time] (in Russian). Archived from the original on 12 October 2015.
- Voren, Robert van (12 September 2015d). "Путин - неизлечимый пироман, повышающий ставки" [Putin is an incurable pyromane who rises stakes]. Новое Время [New Time] (in Russian). Archived from the original on 29 September 2015.
- Voren, Robert van (26 June 2015e). "Домашний русский медведь. Москва застала Запад врасплох" [The pet Russian bear. Moscow caught the West unawares]. Новое Время [New Time] (in Russian). Archived from the original on 26 July 2015.
- Wynnyckyj, Andrij (8 December 1996). "Geneva Initiative on Psychiatry promotes reform of mental health institutions in Ukraine". The Ukrainian Weekly. Vol. LXIV, no. 49. p. 3.

== Books ==
- Voren, Robert van (1983). Political psychiatry in the USSR. Amsterdam: Stichting Comité Vladimir Boekovski [Vladimir Bukovsky Foundation Committee].
- Voren, Robert van (1987). Koryagin: a man struggling for human dignity. Second World Press. ISBN 90-71271-07-2.
- Voren, Robert van (1988). Pere-strojka of de-strojka?: de Sovjetunie op weg naar de eenentwintigste eeuw [Pere-strojka of de-strojka?: the Soviet Union by the twenty first century] (in Dutch). Buijten & Schipperheijn. ISBN 90-6064-683-5.
- Voren, Robert van; Bukovskiĭ, Vladimir (1988). Gorbatsjov, tussen hoop en illusie [Gorbachev, between hope and illusion] (in Dutch). Buijten & Schipperheijn. ISBN 90-6064-673-8.
- Voren, Robert van; Bloch, Sidney (1989). Soviet psychiatric abuse in the Gorbachev era. International Association on the Political Use of Psychiatry. ISBN 90-72657-01-2.
- Voren, Robert van; Bon, Alexander (1989). Nationalism in the USSR: problems of nationalities. Second World Center. ISBN 90-71271-10-2.
- Voren, Robert van (2009b). On dissidents and madness: from the Soviet Union of Leonid Brezhnev to the "Soviet Union" of Vladimir Putin. Amsterdam—New York: Rodopi. ISBN 978-90-420-2585-1.
- Voren, Robert van (2010c). Cold War in psychiatry: human factors, secret actors. Amsterdam—New York: Rodopi. ISBN 978-90-420-3048-0.
- Voren, Robert van (2011). Neįsisavinta praeitis: Holokaustas Lietuvoje [Undigested past: the Holocaust in Lithuania] (in Lithuanian). Kaunas: Vytauto Didžiojo universitetas (Vytautas Magnus University). ISBN 978-9955-12-716-1.
- Voren, Robert van (2011). Undigested past: the Holocaust in Lithuania. Amsterdam—New York: Rodopi. ISBN 978-94-012-0070-7.
