= Andrei Sakharov Research Center =

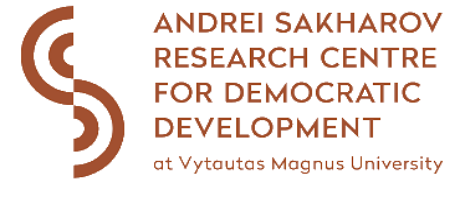
The logo of the Andrei Sakharov Research Center for Democratic Development

The Andrei Sakharov Research Center for Democratic Development or ASRC, ASRCDD (Lithuanian: Andrejaus Sacharovo demokratijos plėtros tyrimų centras)) is a university think tank which encompasses academic events, publications and archival holdings. The Center was founded in December 2017 at the Vytautas Magnus University (VMU).

The Center organizes annual international scientific conferences, historical and educational exhibitions, workshops and a number of other events, as well as conducts relevant research, publishes academic papers and other publications. The Center also functions as an archive of a vast variety of books, documents and other archival material on the Eastern European and post-Soviet space, political science, history (especially since the World War II period), dissident movements, political freedom, resistance, international relations and others.

The Andrei Sakharov Research Center for Democratic Development is headed by the human rights activist, historian, Sovietologist, professor Robert van Voren.

== Archival holdings and library ==
The Center collects archives on issues related to the democratic movement in the Soviet Union and at the moment has:

1. Archival holdings from Sovietologists Martin Dewhirst and Peter Reddaway;
2. A growing archive on the independent press in the Soviet Union;
3. The most extensive archive on the political abuse of psychiatry in the Soviet Union;
4. The photo archive of the Bukovsky Foundation/Second World Center;
5. The archive of the complaints office of the Ukrainian Psychiatric Association covering the period 1991-2001.

The Center has a large number of books donated by Peter Reddaway, Andrew Blane, Edward Kline, and Peter Reddaway, as well as donations from several UK-based scholars and Sovietologists.

The Center collaborates with the Research Center on Eastern Europe at Bremen University, with whom it exchanges holdings and collaborates on digitalization plans.

== Publications ==
- The Legacy of Soviet Psychiatry
- Нам Нужен Сахаров (We need Sakharov)
- Building Bridges – Thoughts about the other Russia
- Guidebook – Andrei Dmitrievich Sakharov, Person of the Era
- Kaleidoscope of Opposition to Communist Rule

== Conferences ==
- The Eleventh International Sakharov Conference was hosted by the New Democracy Fund and the Andrei Sakharov Center for Democratic Development at the Danish Parliament in Copenhagen on December 10, 2021. The conference was an international event that marked the UN International Day of Human Rights and the centenary of Andrei Sakharov (1921-1989), human rights champion and Nobel Peace Prize laureate.
- The Twelfth International Sakharov Conference took place on May 13-14, 2022 at Vytautas the Great War Museum in Kaunas, Lithuania. The topic of the conference was "Forgiving or Forgetting – Dealing with a Painful Past." Hosted in the context of the beginning of the Russian invasion of Ukraine, the conference discussed the aftermath of such events – the time when nations are being rebuilt, economies again prosper, people get on with their lives, but the scars of what happened remain painful, sometimes even open, and continue to affect our lives.
- The Thirteenth International Sakharov Conference took place on May 18-19, 2023 at the Town Hall of Vilnius. The conference was titled "How to Win a Lasting Peace?" and focused on the Russian invasion of Ukraine and the complex issues that Ukraine will face after the guns fell silent and the reconstruction of the country commences.
- On September 21, 2018, the Center organized the conference "The Legacy of Soviet Psychiatry", discussing the heritage of Soviet psychiatry and its abuse for political purposes.
- On September 20, 2019, the Center organized the conference "Building Brides – Thoughts about the other Russia".
- The Third Leonidas Donskis Memorial Conference on September 21, 2020, focused on the mental health consequences of the COVID-19 pandemic. Under the heading "Mind the Gap- Emotional Wellbeing and Social Solidarity during COVID-19", the conference analyzed the consequences of the restrictive measures on the mental health of the general population, but also the serious implications for persons with mental health problems who are usually already more isolated in society and thus suffer double consequences.
- The fourth Leonidas Donskis Memorial Conference took place on September 21, 2021 with the theme "Difficult Dilemmas – the Role of Museums and Public Space in Remembering the Past".
- The Fifth Leonidas Donskis Conference took place in the Palace of the Grand Dukes, Vilnius on September 20-21, 2022 and focused on the influence of collective trauma on society.

== Patrons ==
The Patrons of the Andrei Sakharov Research Center are:

- Mustafa Dzhemilev (UA)
- Semen Gluzman (UA)
- Pavel Litvinov (USA)
- Peter Reddaway (USA)
- Tatyana Yankelevich (USA)
- Marina Sakharov-Liberman (USA)
- Egidius Aleksandravicius (LT)
- Liliya Shevtsova (UK)
- Edward Lucas (UK)
- Elizabeth Teague (UK)
- Francis Greene (UK)
