= Admiralty House (Stockholm) =

Historical building in Stockholm, Sweden

Coordinates: 59°19′32″N 18°04′53″E

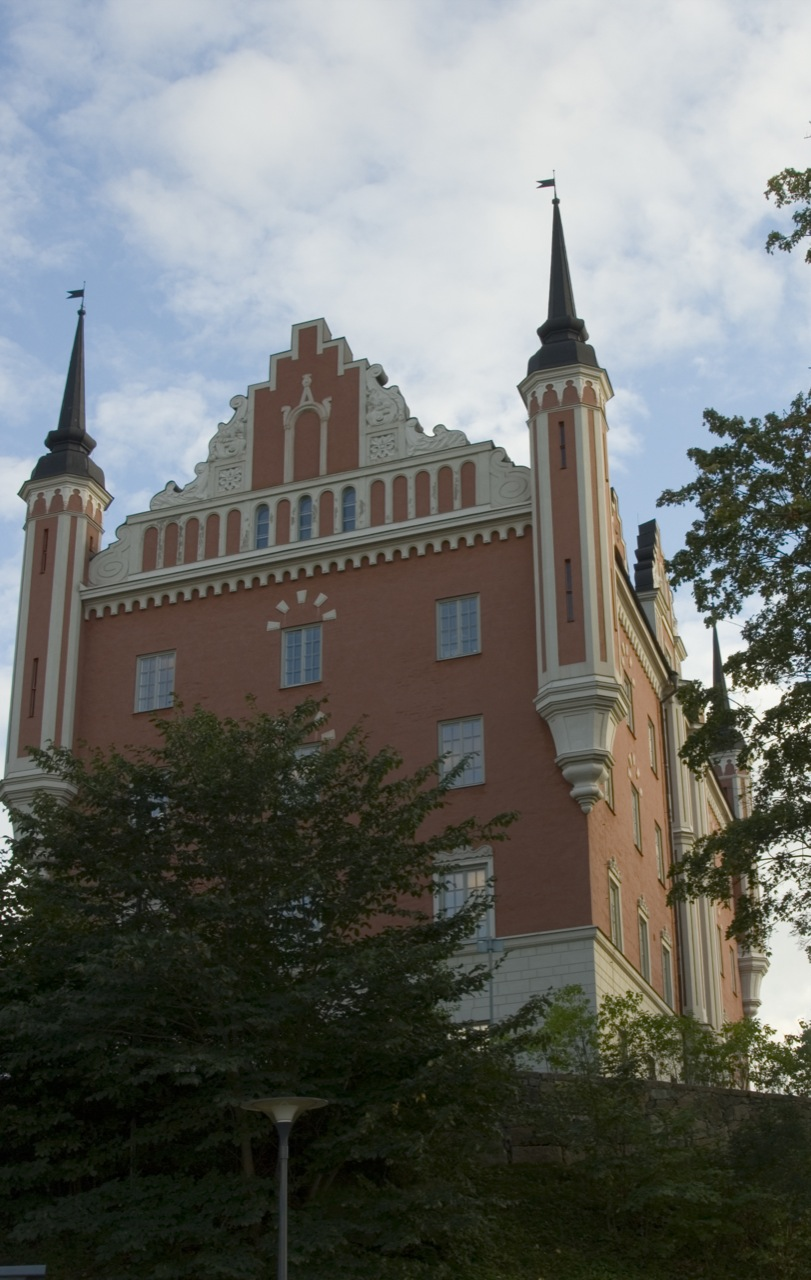
Amiralitetshuset in October 2006.

The Admiralty House (Swedish: Amiralitetshuset) is an admiralty house on the islet Skeppsholmen in central Stockholm, Sweden.

Built in 1647-50 as the Admiralty Board of Sweden moved over to Skeppsholmen, and probably designed by Louis Gillis, a Dutch architect operating in Stockholm since the 1620s, it was built in a Dutch Renaissance style with stepped gables, much like the present building, but the limestone portal is the only part remaining from this period. In 1680-1750 it was used as an archive, and then as a corn stable until 1794 when rebuilt as a barrack.

Still used as the latter, it was redesigned in 1844-46 by the architect Fredrik Blom as a Neo-Renaissance building with turrets added on the corners.

It was rebuilt in 1952 by Rudolf Cronstedt to accommodate the Admiralty again, but today houses the Swedish Institute of International Affairs (Utrikespolitiska institutet, UI).

== See also ==
- Architecture of Stockholm
