= Social Psychiatry and Psychiatric Epidemiology =

- Language: English
- Edited by: Ulrich Reininghaus

Publication details
- Former name: Social Psychiatry
- History: 1966-present
- Publisher: Springer Nature
- Frequency: Monthly
- Impact factor: 3.5 (2025)

Standard abbreviations
- ISO 4: Soc. Psychiatry Psychiatr. Epidemiol.

Indexing
- CODEN: SPPEEM
- ISSN: 0933-7954 (print); 1433-9285 (web)
- OCLC no.: 647424351

Links
- Journal homepage; Online archive

Social Psychiatry and Psychiatric Epidemiology is a monthly peer-reviewed medical journal covering the epidemiology of psychiatric disorders. It was established in 1966 under the name Social Psychiatry, obtaining its current name in 1988. It is published by Springer-Nature.

In 2026, Ulrich Reininghaus (Central Institute of Mental Health; ZI Mannheim) became the sole editor-in-chief, prior to a period (2014-2026) as Joint-EiC with Craig Morgan (King's College London). The current Deputy Editor-in-Chief is James B. Kirkbride (UCL).

According to the Journal Citation Reports, the journal has a 2025 impact factor of 3.5.
