= Global Initiative on Psychiatry =

International non-governmental organisation

- Formation: 20 October 1980; 46 years ago
- Founder: Gérard Bles
- Type: Non-profit; NGO
- Headquarters: Lorentzweg 45 B 1221 EE, Hilversum, Netherlands
- Fields: psychiatry
- 1986–present Chief Executive: Robert van Voren, Ph.D.
- Subsidiaries: Working Group on the Internment of Dissenters in Mental Hospitals; Committee of French Psychiatrists Against the Use of Psychiatry for Political Purposes; German Association Against the Political Abuse of Psychiatry; International Podrabinek Fund; Swiss Association Against Psychiatric Abuse for Political Purposes
- Website: www.gip-global.org

Global Initiative on Psychiatry (GIP) is an international foundation for mental health reform which took part in the campaign against the political abuse of psychiatry in the USSR. The organization is of NGO type.

Headquartered in Hilversum, GIP has regional centers in Tbilisi, Sofia, and Vilnius, and a country office in Dushanbe.

GIP is a main contributor to improving psychiatric care in countries of the former Soviet Union as well as Central and Eastern Europe. It has expanded its focus and as of 2010 is including projects in Asia, Africa, and the Caribbean.

GIP also focuses on the political abuse of psychiatry throughout the world and human rights monitoring.

== History ==
20 December 1980 saw the formation in Paris of the International Association on the Political Use of Psychiatry (IAPUP) whose first secretary was Dr Gérard Bles of France. Since the Congress in Honolulu in 1978, he has inspired the movement against the use of psychiatry for political ends. The organization campaigned against the political abuse of psychiatry in the Soviet Union by leading efforts within national and international psychiatric organizations to eradicate this systematic abuse. The IAPUP had no connection with any political group nor with antipsychiatry. The organization brought together and coordinated independent groups dedicated to the struggle against political abuse of psychiatry and composed of psychiatrists and human rights activists from Canada, France, the United Kingdom, the Netherlands, Switzerland, and West Germany. During its first two decades IAPUP, investigated the accusations of oppressive exploitation in a number of countries such as Argentina, Bulgaria, Chile, Czechoslovakia, Cuba, Eastern Germany, Hungary, Romania, South Africa, the Netherlands, and Yugoslavia. The publication of the IAPUP was Information Bulletin. The IAPUP included the following participating committees:

1. Working Group on the Internment of Dissenters in Mental Hospitals;
2. Committee of French Psychiatrists Against the Use of Psychiatry for Political Purposes;
3. German Association Against the Political Abuse of Psychiatry;
4. International Podrabinek Fund;
5. Swiss Association Against Psychiatric Abuse for Political Purposes.

In 1986, Robert van Voren became General Secretary of the IAPUP. After the dissolution of the Soviet Union, the financing of the IAPUP headed by Robert van Voren ceased until it adopted program of broad compromises and, correspondingly, the opposite name of The International Association for the Abolition and Prevention of Political Psychiatry, or Geneva Initiative on Psychiatry. In 2005, the organization was renamed Global Initiative on Psychiatry (GIP). From 1995 to 2000, Chair of the Geneva Initiative on Psychiatry was James Birley.

== Leadership ==
The board is composed of professionals from some twenty countries. Chief Executive of the Global Initiative on Psychiatry is Robert van Voren, an Honorary Fellow of the British Royal College of Psychiatrists and Honorary Member of the Ukrainian Psychiatric Association. In 2005, he was knighted by Queen Beatrix of the Netherlands for his work as a human rights activist. He is a professor of Soviet and post-Soviet Studies in the Ilia State University in Tbilisi (Georgia) and in the Vytautas Magnus University in Kaunas (Lithuania).

== Approach ==
The Global Initiative on Psychiatry uses a local approach to helping the mentally ill in underprivileged countries around the world. In Robert van Voren's words, their idea is that "mental health services should be locally empowered, locally adapted, community based, user oriented, and focused on keeping people with mental illness in society, instead of taking them out." The organization has been involved in deinstitutionalizing mental health services for children in post-Communist countries. The GIP dedicates itself to promoting the necessary reforms to implement "humane, ethical, and effective mental health care throughout the world." Reports by the Global Initiative on Psychiatry are often comprehensive and consider the treatment options. The organization has campaigned with substantial success against poor mental health practices abroad, especially in China and the former communist states. Robert van Voren's contribution to reform of forensic psychiatry in states of the former Soviet Union is widely recognized.

== Sources ==
- Adler, Nanci; Mueller, Gerard; Ayat, Mohammed (March 1993). "Psychiatry under tyranny: a report on the political abuse of Romanian psychiatry during the Ceausescu years". Current Psychology. 12 (1): 3–17. doi:10.1007/BF02737088. PMID 11652327.
- Banerjee, Anwesha (July 2012). "Cross-cultural variance of schizophrenia in symptoms, diagnosis and treatment". The Georgetown Undergraduate Journal of Health Sciences. 6 (2): 18–24. Archived (PDF) from the original on 11 August 2015.
- Besse, Antoine (2006). "La psychiatrie française et sa représentation internationale" [French psychiatry and its international image]. In Bokobza, Hervé (ed.). La psychiatrie en péril. En dépit des Etats généraux [Psychiatry in peril. Despite its general condition] (in French). ERES. pp. 187–191. ISBN 9782749206738.
- Birley, Jim (January 2000). "Political abuse of psychiatry". Acta Psychiatrica Scandinavica. 101 (399): 13–15. doi:10.1111/j.0902-4441.2000.007s020[dash]3.x. PMID 10794019.
- Birley, Jim (1 March 2004). "Political abuse of psychiatry". Psychiatry. 3 (3): 22–25. doi:10.1383/psyt.3.3.22.30675.
- Bloch, Sidney; Reddaway, Peter (1985). Soviet psychiatric abuse: the shadow over world psychiatry. Westview Press. p. 273. ISBN 0-8133-0209-9.
- Buckingham, Elizabeth; Schrage, Ezra; Cournos, Francine (17 January 2013). "Why the treatment of mental disorders is an important component of HIV prevention among people who inject drugs". Advances in Preventive Medicine: 1–9. doi:10.1155/2013/690386. PMC 3562640. PMID 23401785.
- Clark, Fiona (11 January 2014). "Is psychiatry being used for political repression in Russia?". The Lancet. 383 (9912): 114–115. doi:10.1016/S0140-6736(13)62706-3. PMID 24422214.
- Donskis, Leonidas (2009). A Litmus test case of modernity: examining modern sensibilities and the public domain in the Baltic States at the turn of the century. Peter Lang. p. 314. ISBN 978-3-0343-0335-4.
- Gordon, Harvey (31 July 2006). "Reform of forensic psychiatry in the former Soviet Union". Psychiatric Bulletin. 30 (8): 313. doi:10.1192/pb.30.8.313.
- Levin, Aaron (1 February 2013). "Global Initiative on Psychiatry". Psychiatric News. 48 (3). American Psychiatric Association: 12. doi:10.1176/appi.pn.2013.2a17.
- Leygraf, Vrolg (27 June 2010). "Ist die nachträgliche Sicherungsverwahrung am Ende?" [Is compulsory hospitalization unprofitable in the end?]. Der Nervenarzt [The Neurologist] (in German). 81 (7): 867–872. doi:10.1007/s00115-010-3046-0.
- Matas, Manuel (December 1989). "The ethics of involuntary hospitalization and treatment of mentally ill persons". The Canadian Journal of Psychiatry. 34 (9): 945–947. doi:10.1177/070674378903400924. PMID 2611761.
- McLeigh, Jill; Sianko, Natallia (January 2011). "What should be done to promote mental health around the world?". American Journal of Orthopsychiatry. 81 (1): 83–89. doi:10.1111/j.1939-0025.2010.01074.x. PMID 21219278.
- Mossialos, Elias; Murthy, Anant; McDaid, David (March 2003). "European Union enlargement: will mental health be forgotten again?" (PDF). European Journal of Public Health. 13 (1): 2–3. doi:10.1093/eurpub/13.1.2. PMID 12678306. Archived from the original (PDF) on 2016-03-06.
- Narayan, Choudhary (January 2013). "Political abuse of psychiatry". Indian Journal of Psychiatry. 55 (1): 96. doi:10.4103/0019-5545.105529. PMC 3574467. PMID 23436943.
- Pallot, Judith; Piacentini, Laura; Moran, Dominique (2012). Gender, geography, and punishment: the experience of women in carceral Russia. OUP Oxford. p. 234. ISBN 978-0199658619.
- Richmond, Caroline (24 October 2013). "Jim Birley obituary. Leading social psychiatrist who transformed the understanding of schizophrenia". The Guardian.
- Savenko, Yuri [Юрий Савенко] (2009). "20-летие НПА России" [20th anniversary of the IPA of Russia]. Nezavisimiy Psikhiatricheskiy Zhurnal the Independent Psychiatric Journal (in Russian) (1): 5–18. ISSN 1028-8554.
- Targum, Steven; Chaban, Oleh; Mykhnyak, Serhiy (April 2013). "Psychiatry in the Ukraine". Innovations in Clinical Neuroscience. 10 (4): 41–46. PMC 3659038. PMID 23696959.
- Tobin, John (June 2013). "Editorial: political abuse of psychiatry in authoritarian systems". Irish Journal of Psychological Medicine. 30 (2). College of Psychiatrists of Ireland: 97–102. doi:10.1017/ipm.2013.23.
- Voren, Robert van (31 March 2006). "Reforming forensic psychiatry and prison mental health in the former Soviet Union". Psychiatric Bulletin. 30 (4): 124–126. doi:10.1192/pb.30.4.124.
- Voren, Robert van (2009). On dissidents and madness: from the Soviet Union of Leonid Brezhnev to the "Soviet Union" of Vladimir Putin. Amsterdam—New York: Rodopi. pp. xii. ISBN 978-90-420-2585-1.
- Voren, Robert van (2010a). Cold war in psychiatry: human factors, secret actors. Amsterdam—New York: Rodopi. p. 111. ISBN 978-90-420-3048-0.
- Voren, Robert van (2010b). "Political abuse of psychiatry—an historical overview" (PDF). Schizophrenia Bulletin. 36 (1): 33–35. doi:10.1093/schbul/sbp119. PMC 2800147. PMID 19892821. Archived from the original (PDF) on 2011-07-26.
- Voren, Robert van (2013). "Психиатрия как средство репрессий в советских и постсоветских странах [Psychiatry as a tool of coercion in post-Soviet countries]". Вестник Ассоциации психиатров Украины [The Herald of the Ukrainian Psychiatric Association] (in Russian) (5). The Ukrainian Psychiatric Association.
- Wiseberg, Laurie; Sirett, Hazel (1982). Human rights directory, Western Europe: a directory of organizations in Western Europe concerned with issues of human rights and social justice. Human Rights Internet. p. 119. ISBN 0939338017.
- "What GIP does". Global Initiative on Psychiatry. Archived from the original on 20 November 2020.
