= Stockholm Centre for Eastern European Studies =

Swedish research institute

The Stockholm Centre for Eastern European Studies (Swedish: Centrum för Östeuropastudier, SCEEUS) is a non-profit organization based in Stockholm, Sweden, opened in 2020 by the Swedish Institute of International Affairs. At its foundation it was managed by Fredrik Löjdquist.

SCEEUS provides politically relevant analyses regarding Armenia, Azerbaijan, Belarus, Georgia, Moldova, Russia and Ukraine.

SCEEUS received guidance from an advisory board that also assesses the quality and relevance of its work. This advisory board has a chairman from the Swedish Ministry for Foreign Affairs and representatives from its parent organization the Swedish Institute of International Affairs, Stockholm Institute of Transition Economics (SITE), Swedish Defence Research Agency (FOI), Institute for Russian and Eurasian Studies at University of Uppsala (IRES) and a representative of the Swedish business community.
