= Acta Psychiatrica Scandinavica =

- Discipline: Psychiatry
- Language: English
- Edited by: Ida Hageman

Publication details
- History: 1926-present
- Publisher: Wiley-Blackwell
- Frequency: Monthly
- Open access: Hybrid
- Impact factor: 7.734 (2021)

Standard abbreviations
- ISO 4: Acta Psychiatr. Scand.

Indexing
- CODEN: APYSA9
- ISSN: 0001-690X (print); 1600-0447 (web)
- OCLC no.: 00825431

Links
- Journal homepage; Online access; Online archive

The Acta Psychiatrica Scandinavica is a Scandinavian peer-reviewed medical journal containing original research, systematic reviews etc. relating to clinical and experimental psychiatry. According to the Journal Citation Reports, the journal has a 2021 impact factor of 7.734. Its editor-in-chief is Ida Hageman (Region Hovedstadens Psykiatri).

== See also ==
- List of psychiatry journals
