= Journal of the American Academy of Psychiatry and the Law =

- Discipline: American law, Psychiatry
- Language: English

Publication details
- Former names: Bulletin of the American Academy of Psychiatry and the Law
- History: 1969–present
- Publisher: American Academy of Psychiatry and the Law
- Frequency: Quarterly

Standard abbreviations
- ISO 4: J. Am. Acad. Psychiatry Law

Indexing
- CODEN: JAPLF
- ISSN: 1093-6793 (print); 1943-3662 (web)
- LCCN: 98641915

Links
- Journal homepage

The Journal of the American Academy of Psychiatry and the Law is a quarterly academic journal published by the American Academy of Psychiatry and the Law. It was established in 1969 and until 1997 was titled Bulletin of the American Academy of Psychiatry and the Law.

== Abstracting and indexing ==
The journal is indexed and abstracted in the following bibliographic databases:

- Criminal Justice Abstracts
- MEDLINE
- Psycinfo
- Public Affairs Index
- Scopus
- Social Sciences Citation Index
- Sociology Source Ultimate

According to Scopus the journal as a 2024 CiteScore of 1.8, placing 130th out of 204 in the category "Pathology and Forensic Medicine" and 384th out of 580 in the category "Psychiatry and Mental Health".
