= Struggle against political abuse of psychiatry in the Soviet Union =

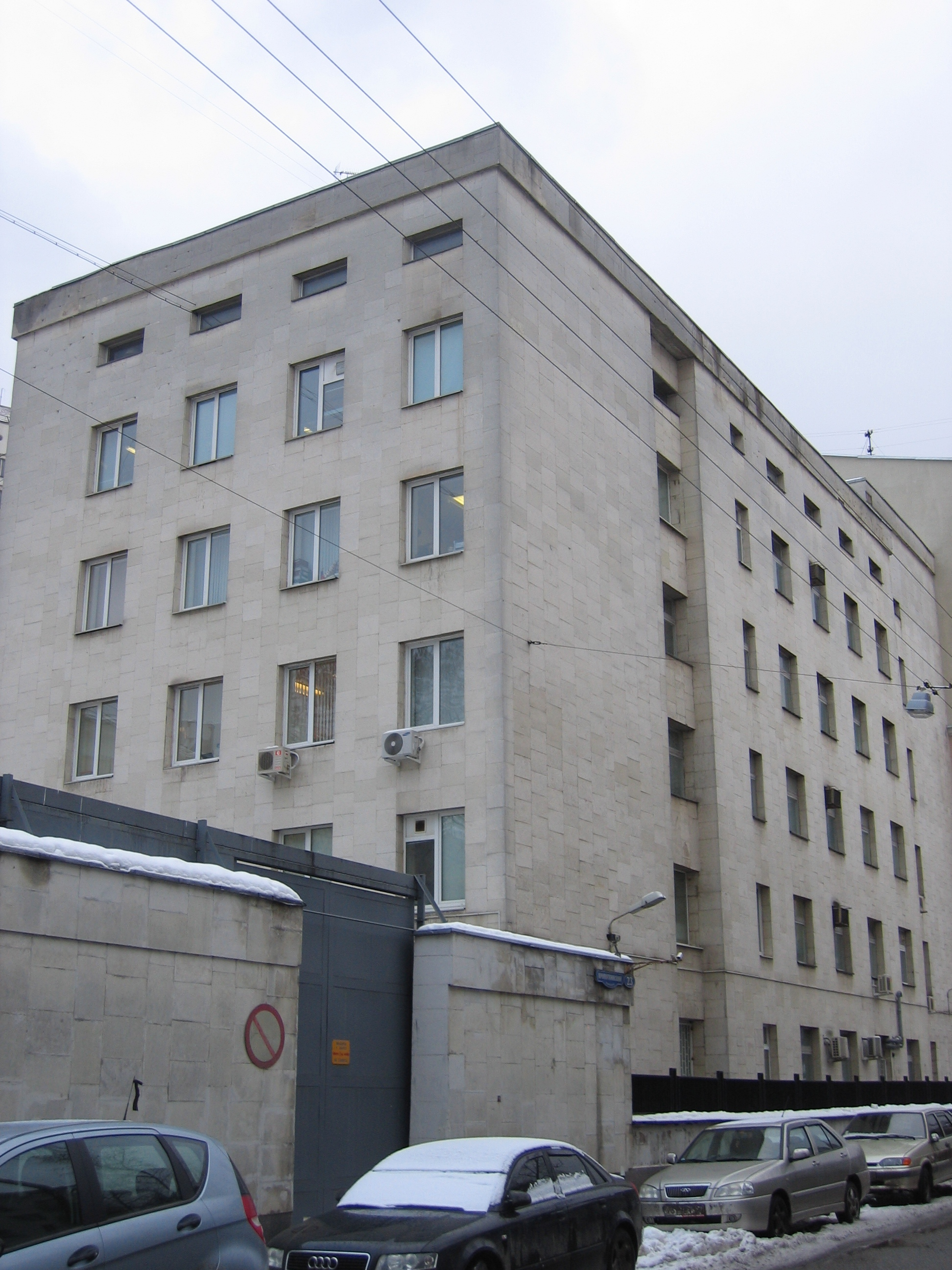
The Serbsky Central Research Institute for Forensic Psychiatry, also briefly called the Serbsky Institute (the part of its building in Moscow)

In the Soviet Union, systematic political abuse of psychiatry took place and was based on the interpretation of political dissent as a psychiatric problem. It was called "psychopathological mechanisms" of dissent.

During the leadership of General Secretary Leonid Brezhnev, psychiatry was used as a tool to eliminate political opponents ("dissidents") who openly expressed beliefs that contradicted official dogma. The term "philosophical intoxication" was widely used to diagnose mental disorders in cases where people disagreed with leaders and made them the target of criticism that used the writings by Karl Marx, Friedrich Engels, and Vladimir Lenin. Article 58-10 of the Stalin Criminal Code—which as Article 70 had been shifted into the RSFSR Criminal Code of 1962—and Article 190-1 of the RSFSR Criminal Code along with the system of diagnosing mental illness, developed by academician Andrei Snezhnevsky, created the very preconditions under which non-standard beliefs could easily be transformed into a criminal case, and it, in its turn, into a psychiatric diagnosis. Anti-Soviet political behavior, in particular, being outspoken in opposition to the authorities, demonstrating for reform, writing books were defined in some persons as being simultaneously a criminal act (e.g., violation of Articles 70 or 190-1), a symptom (e.g., "delusion of reformism"), and a diagnosis (e.g., "sluggish schizophrenia"). Within the boundaries of the diagnostic category, the symptoms of pessimism, poor social adaptation and conflict with authorities were themselves sufficient for a formal diagnosis of "sluggish schizophrenia."

The psychiatric incarceration was conducted to suppress emigration, distribution of prohibited documents or books, participation in civil rights actions and demonstrations, and involvement in forbidden religious activity. The religious faith of prisoners, including well-educated former atheists who adopted a religion, was determined to be a form of mental illness that needed to be cured. The KGB routinely sent dissenters to psychiatrists for diagnosing to avoid embarrassing public trials and to discredit dissidence as the product of ill minds. Formerly highly classified extant documents from "Special file" of the Central Committee of the Communist Party of the Soviet Union published after the dissolution of the Soviet Union demonstrate that the authorities of the country quite consciously used psychiatry as a tool to suppress dissent.

In the 1960s, a vigorous movement grew up protesting against abuse of psychiatry in the USSR. Political abuse of psychiatry in the Soviet Union was denounced in the course of the Congresses of the World Psychiatric Association in Mexico City (1971), Hawaii (1977), Vienna (1983) and Athens (1989). The campaign to terminate political abuse of psychiatry in the USSR was a key episode in the Cold War, inflicting irretrievable damage on the prestige of Soviet medicine. In 1971, Vladimir Bukovsky smuggled to the West a file of 150 pages documenting the political abuse of psychiatry, which he sent to The Times. The documents were photocopies of forensic reports on prominent Soviet dissidents. In January 1972, Bukovsky was convicted of spreading anti-Soviet propaganda under Criminal Code, mainly on the ground that he had, with anti-Soviet intention, circulated false reports about political dissenters. Action Group for the Defense of Human Rights in the USSR stated that Bukosky was arrested as a direct result of his appeal to world's psychiatrists, thereby suggesting that now they held his destiny in their hands. In 1974, Bukovsky and the incarcerated psychiatrist Semyon Gluzman wrote A Manual on Psychiatry for Dissidents, which provided potential future victims of political psychiatry with instructions on how to behave during inquest in order to avoid being diagnosed as mentally sick.

Political abuse of psychiatry in Russia continues after the fall of the Soviet Union and threatens human rights activists with a psychiatric diagnosis.

== Background ==
Political abuse of psychiatry is the misuse of psychiatric diagnosis, detention and treatment for the purposes of obstructing the fundamental human rights of certain groups and individuals in a society. It entails the exculpation and committal of citizens to psychiatric facilities based upon political rather than mental health-based criteria. Many authors, including psychiatrists, also use the terms "Soviet political psychiatry" or "punitive psychiatry" to refer to this phenomenon.

In the book Punitive Medicine by Alexander Podrabinek, the term "punitive medicine", which is identified with "punitive psychiatry," is defined as "a tool in the struggle against dissidents who cannot be punished by legal means." Punitive psychiatry is neither a discrete subject nor a psychiatric specialty but, rather, it is an emergency arising within many applied sciences in totalitarian countries where members of a profession may feel themselves compelled to service the diktats of power. Psychiatric confinement of sane people is uniformly considered a particularly pernicious form of repression and Soviet punitive psychiatry was one of the key weapons of both illegal and legal repression.

In the Soviet Union dissidents were often confined in the so-called psikhushka, or psychiatric wards. Psikhushka is the Russian ironic diminutive for "mental hospital". One of the first psikhushkas was the Psychiatric Prison Hospital in the city of Kazan. In 1939 it was transferred to the control of the NKVD, the secret police and the precursor organization to the KGB, under the order of Lavrentiy Beria, who was the head of the NKVD. International human rights defenders such as Walter Reich have long recorded the methods by which Soviet psychiatrists in Psikhushka hospitals diagnosed schizophrenia in political dissenters. Western scholars examined no aspect of Soviet psychiatry as thoroughly as its involvement in the social control of political dissenters.

As early as 1948, the Soviet secret service took an interest in this area of medicine. It was one of the superiors of the Soviet secret police, Andrey Vyshinsky, who first ordered the use of psychiatry as a tool of repression. Russian psychiatrist Pyotr Gannushkin also believed that in a class society, especially during the most severe class struggle, psychiatry was incapable of not being repressive. A system of political abuse of psychiatry was developed at the end of Joseph Stalin's regime. However, according to Alexander Etkind, punitive psychiatry was not simply an inheritance from the Stalin era as the GULAG (the acronym for Chief Administration for Corrective Labor Camps, the penitentiary system in the Stalin years) was an effective instrument of political repression and there was no compelling requirement to develop an alternative and expensive psychiatric substitute. The abuse of psychiatry was a natural product of the later Soviet era. From the mid-1970s to the 1990s, the structure of mental health service conformed to the double standard in society, that of two separate systems which peacefully co-existed despite conflicts between them:

1. the first system was punitive psychiatry that straight served the institute of power and was led by the Moscow Institute for Forensic Psychiatry named after Vladimir Serbsky;
2. the second system was composed of elite, psychotherapeutically oriented clinics and was led by the Leningrad Psychoneurological Institute named after Vladimir Bekhterev.

The hundreds of hospitals in the provinces combined components of both systems.

== Soviet psychiatric abuse exposed ==
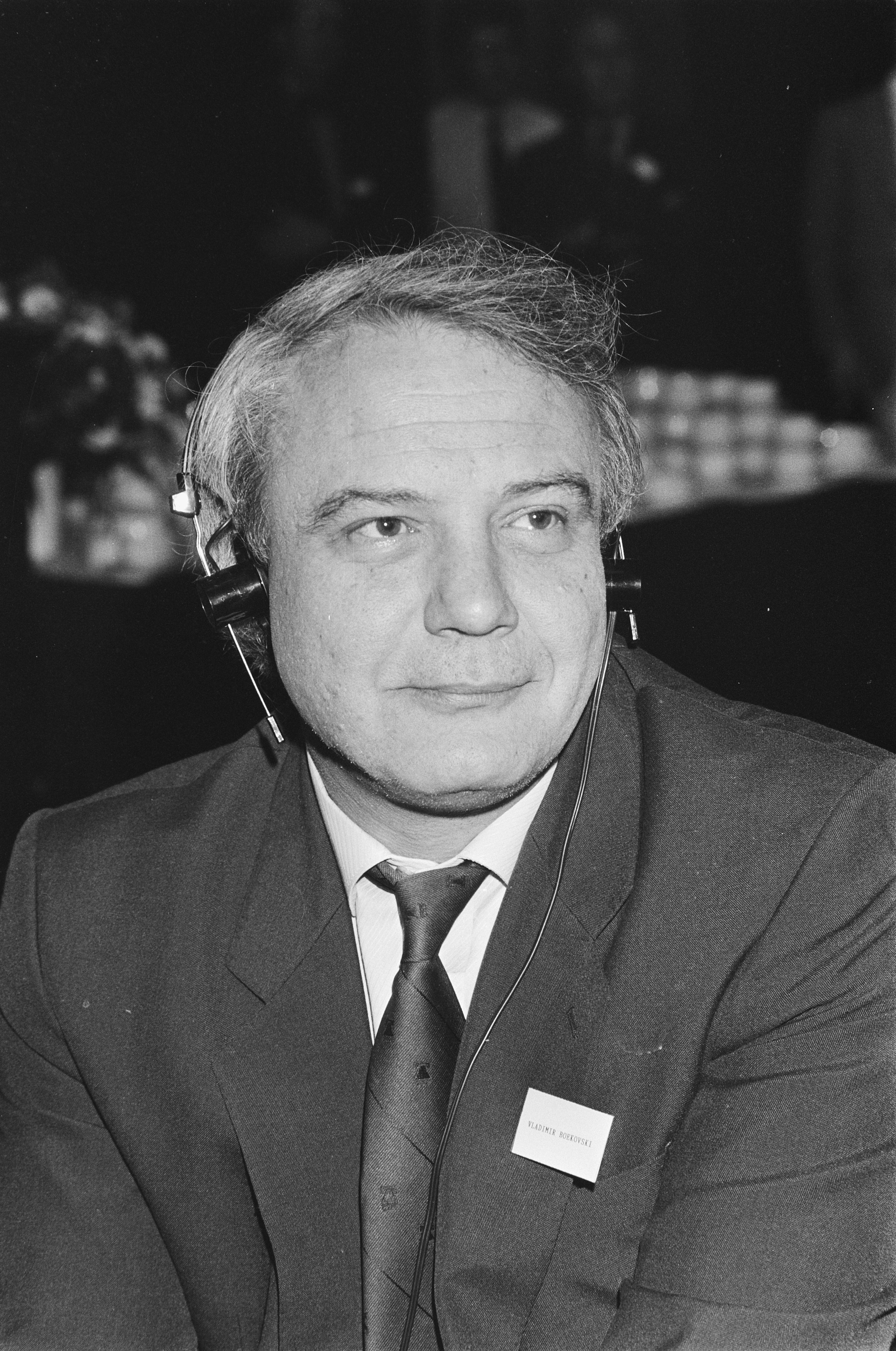
Vladimir Bukovsky (b. 1942), a British neurophysiologist, Soviet human rights activist, political prisoner at the Sakharov Congress in Amsterdam on 21 May 1987

"In recent years in our country a number of court orders have been made involving the placing in psychiatric hospitals ("of special type" and otherwise) of people who in the opinion of their relatives and close friends are mentally healthy. These people are: Grigorenko, Rips, Gorbanevskaya, Novodvorskaya, Yakhimovich, Gershuni, Fainberg, Victor Kuznetsov, Iofe, V. Borisov and others – people well known for their initiative in defence of civil rights in the U.S.S.R.

This phenomenon arouses justified anxiety, especially in view of the widely publicized placing of the biologist Zhores Medvedev in a psychiatric hospital by extrajudicial means.

The diagnoses of the psychiatrists who have served as expert witnesses in court, and on whose diagnoses the court orders are based, provoke many doubts as regards their content. However, only specialists in psychiatry can express authoritative opinions about the degree of legitimacy of these diagnoses.

Taking advantage of the fact that I have managed to obtain exact copies of the diagnostic reports made by the forensic-psychiatric groups who examined Grigorenko, Fainberg, Gorbanevskaya, Borisov and Yakhimovich, and also extracts from the diagnosis on V. Kuznetsov, I am sending you these documents, and also various letters and other material which reveal the character of these people. I will be very grateful to you if you can study this material and express your opinion on it.

I realize that at a distance and without the essential clinical information it is very difficult to determine the mental condition of a person and either to diagnose an illness or assert the absence of any illness. Therefore I ask you to express your opinion on only this point: do the above-mentioned diagnoses contain enough scientifically-based evidence not only to indicate the mental illnesses described in the diagnoses, but also to indicate the necessity of isolating these people completely from society?

I will be very happy if you can interest your colleagues in this matter and if you consider it possible to place it on the agenda for discussion at the next International Congress of Psychiatrists.

For a healthy person there is no fate more terrible than indefinite internment in a mental hospital. I believe that you will not remain indifferent to this problem and will devote a portion of your time to it – just as physicists find time to combat the use of the achievements of their science in ways harmful to mankind.

Thanking you in advance,

V. Bukovsky"

— Bukovsky's 1971 letter addressed to Western psychiatrists

In the 1960s, a vigorous movement grew up protesting against abuse of psychiatry in the USSR. Since 1968, A Chronicle of Current Events, the main organ of Soviet human rights movement, has started publishing systematic information on how dissidents were being committed to psychiatric hospitals and forcibly, and often very painfully, treated with drugs. President of the Independent Psychiatric Association of Russia Yuri Savenko says psychiatric repression was obvious to his circle as early as 1968, and president of the Ukrainian Psychiatric Association Semyon Gluzman states no one of Soviet psychiatrists was going to reveal psychiatric repression until Gluzman revealed it in his report. He was the author of An In Absentia Psychiatric Opinion on the Case of P.G. Grigorenko otherwise known as An In Absentia Forensic-psychiatric Report on P.G. Grigorenko; this document started circulating in samizdat form in 1971 and was based on the medical record of Pyotr Grigorenko who spoke against the human rights abuses in the Soviet Union. Gluzman came to the conclusion that Grigorenko was mentally sane and had been taken to mental hospitals for political reasons. In the late 1970s and early 1980s, Gluzman was forced to serve seven years in labor camps and three years in Siberian exile for refusing to diagnose Grigorenko as having the mental illness.

In 1971, Vladimir Bukovsky smuggled to the West a file of 150 pages documenting the political abuse of psychiatry. The documents were photocopies of forensic reports on prominent Soviet dissidents. These documents were attended with a letter by Bukovsky requesting Western psychiatrists to explore the six cases documented in the file and tell whether these persons should be hospitalized or not. The documents were sent by Bukovsky to The Times and, when translated by The Working Group on the Internment of Dissenters in Medical Hospitals, were examined by forty-four psychiatrists from the Department of Psychiatry, Sheffield University. The psychiatrists described the documents in British Journal of Psychiatry of August 1971 and wrote a letter to The Times. In this letter published on 16 September 1971, they reported that four of the six dissidents manifested no signs or history of mental disease, and the other two had minor psychiatric problems many years ago, quite removed from the events related to their internment. The group of British psychiatrists concluded: "It seems to us that the diagnoses on the six people were made purely in consequence of actions in which they were exercising fundamental freedoms...". They recommended discussing the issue in the course of the forthcoming World Psychiatric Association (WPA) World Congress in Mexico in November 1971.

== Congress in Mexico City ==
The Congress in Mexico City was held on 28 November — 4 December 1971. The statement of the forty-four British psychiatrists was circulated to the 7000 delegates in English, Spanish, and French. There were statements from the Soviet Human Rights Committee describing the part played by Snezhnevsky, a head of the Soviet delegation, in the Medvedev case. When speakers demanded that the Congress go on record against the confinement of dissidents in psychiatric hospitals, the Soviet delegation and Snezhnevsky instantly walked out. They said that they could not talk about the issue since the Congress lacked official interpretation into Russian. At this Congress, Western psychiatrists tried to censure their Soviet colleagues for the first time. But the charges of psychiatric abuse were new, the campaign was disorganized, and Snezhnevsky, who headed the Soviet delegation, remained unscathed. He said in rebuttal that the accusations were a "cold-war maneuver carried out at the hands of experts." The WPA General Secretary Denis Leigh said that the WPA was under no obligation to accept complaints from one member society directed against another member society, and he informed Snezhnevsky of the complaints and sent him the "Bukovsky Papers." Leigh proposed to constitute a committee for considering the ethical aspects of psychiatric practice, but also in this instance the issue of political abuse of psychiatry in the USSR was not mentioned.

One of the key apologists of Soviet psychiatric abuse, Soviet psychiatrist Marat Vartanyan, was chosen as associate secretary of the Executive Committee. A day after the Mexico Congress Vartanyan announced publicly that the nature of Soviet system was such that this could not possibly happen. As Robert van Voren wrote, the Armenian Vartanyan was as slick as one could be, and had no problem lying in the twinkling of an eye. He was masterful in his dealings with the WPA and continued to represent the Soviet Union at symposiums and congresses of the WPA. Being in grain hospitable, flamboyant, full of humor and with a Western style, Vartanyan managed to fool one after another. In the end, no action was taken by the Congress. As Psychiatric News reported, it became apparent that the WPA leaders had no desire to take an action which would have alienated the USSR delegation and would quite probably make them "walk out" and sever communications for some time to come.

== First responses ==
The failure to debate the issue opened the door for Soviet authorities to adjudge Bukovsky to 12 years of camp and exile, and to enlarge the use of psychiatry as a tool of repression. In January 1972, Bukovsky was convicted of spreading anti-Soviet propaganda under Article 70 of the RSFSR Criminal Code, mainly on the ground that he had, with anti-Soviet intention, circulated false reports that mentally healthy political dissenters were incarcerated in mental hospitals and were subjected to abuse there. Action Group for the Defence of Human Rights stated that Bukosky was arrested as a direct result of his appeal to world's psychiatrists, thereby suggesting that now they held his destiny in their hands. In one of his books, Bukovsky attributed his punishment to the timorousness of the WPA Congress in Mexico City in 1972: "… as a result of the timorousness of the Congress, I was given 12 years of punishment "for slandering Soviet psychiatry"."

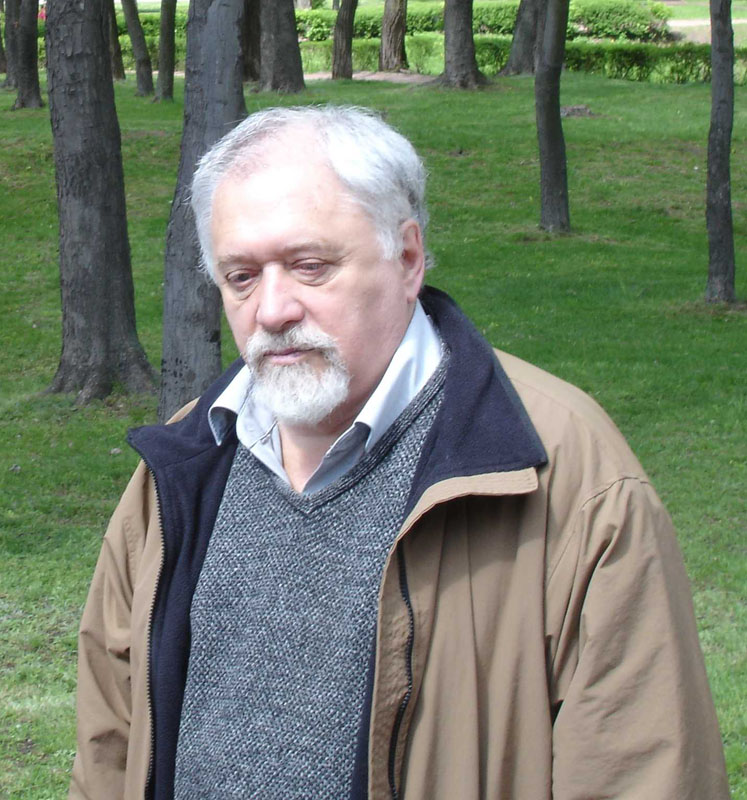
Semyon Gluzman (b. 1946), a Ukrainian psychiatrist, human rights activist and political prisoner

In 1973, the council of the Royal College of Psychiatrists passed the following resolution:

The Royal College of Psychiatrists firmly opposes the use of psychiatric facilities for the detention of persons solely on the basis of their political dissent no matter where it occurs.

In the same year, the Representative Body of the British Medical Association at its annual meeting at Folkestone passed the following motion:

The British Medical Association condemns the practice of using medical men to certify political and religious dissenters as insane and to submit them to unnecessary investigation and treatment.

In 1973, Ruben Nadzharov, the Deputy Director of the Institute of Psychiatry of the USSR Academy of Medical Sciences, stated that talk in the West of the forced commitment of certain dissident representatives of the intelligentsia to psychiatric hospitals was "a component part of the anti-Soviet propaganda campaign that certain circles are trying to stir up in pursuit of highly improper political aims." In 2013, Robert van Voren, who participated in the struggle against abuse of Soviet psychiatry, confirmed that supporting Soviet dissidents was part of anti-Soviet policy.

In 1974, Bukovsky and the incarcerated psychiatrist Semyon Gluzman wrote A Manual on Psychiatry for Dissidents, in which they provided potential future victims of political psychiatry with instructions on how to behave during inquest in order to avoid being diagnosed as mentally sick. The Manual focuses on how "the Soviet use of psychiatry as a punitive means is based upon the deliberate interpretation of heterodoxy (in one sense of the world) as a psychiatric problem." This work was published in Russian, English, French, Italian, German, Danish.

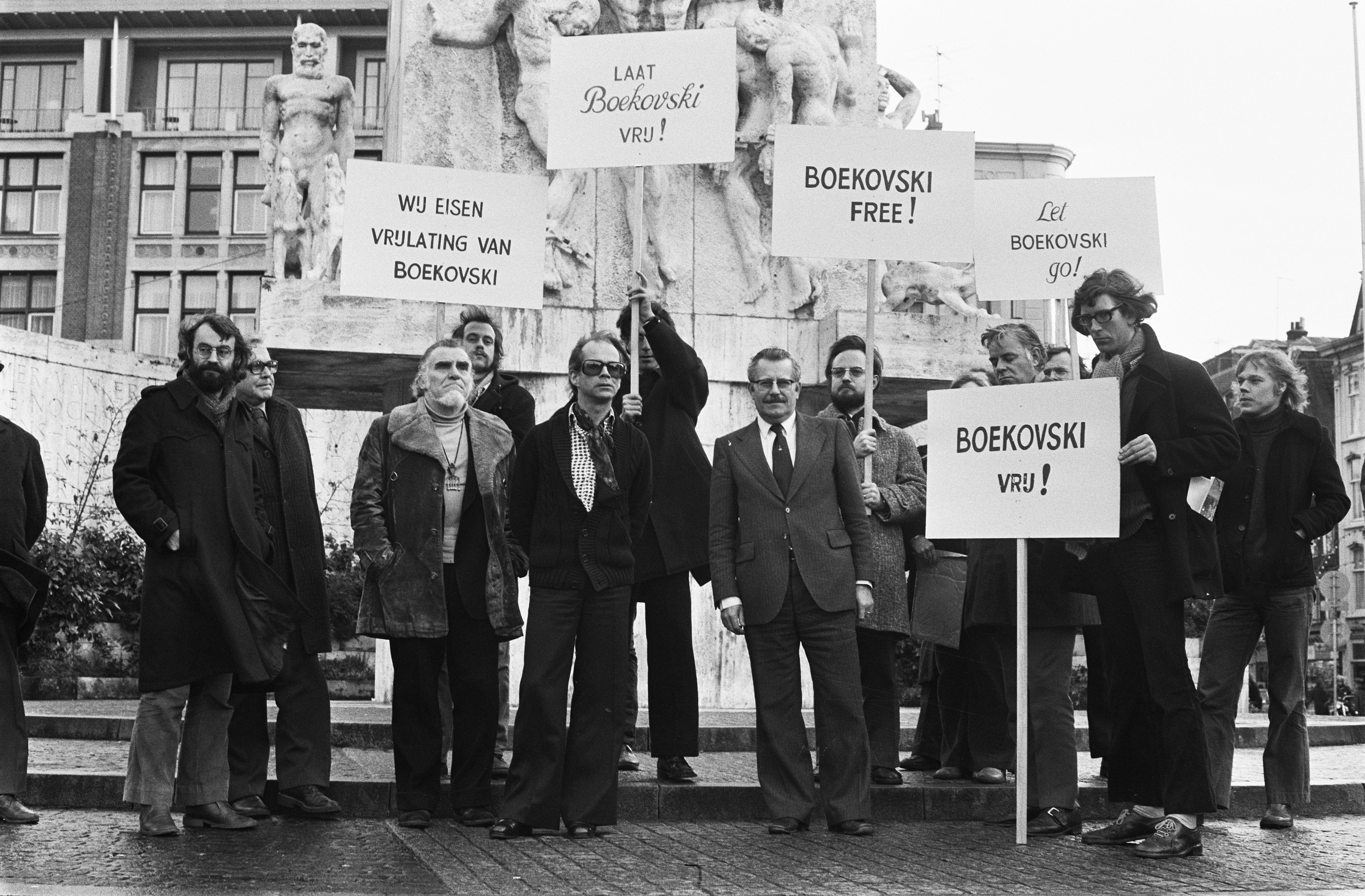
Protest demonstration of January 1975 in Dam, Amsterdam for Vladimir Bukovsky's release from prison

In December 1976, in his eleventh year of psychiatric hospitals and prison camps, Bukovsky was exchanged by the Soviet government for the imprisoned Chilean Communist leader Luis Corvalán at Zürich airport and, after a short stay in the Netherlands, took up refuge in Great Britain where later moved from London to Cambridge for his studies in biology. Voluntary and involuntary emigration allowed the authorities to rid themselves of many political active intellectuals including writers Valentin Turchin, Georgi Vladimov, Vladimir Voinovich, Lev Kopelev, Vladimir Maximov, Naum Korzhavin, Vasily Aksyonov and others.

The appeal made by Bukovsky in 1971 caused the formation of the first groups to campaign against the political abuse of psychiatry in the Soviet Union. In France, a group of doctors constituted the "Committee against the Special Psychiatric Hospitals in the USSR," while in Great Britain a "Working Commission on the Internment of Dissenters in Mental Hospitals" was created. Among its founding members were Peter Reddaway, a Sovietologist and lecturer at the London School of Economics and Political Science, and Sidney Bloch, a South-African born psychiatrist. In September 1975, there was formed the Campaign Against Psychiatric Abuse (CAPA), an organization constituted as the British section of the Initiating Committee Against Abuses of Psychiatry for Political Purposes and composed of psychiatrists, other doctors, and laymen. In July 1976 in Trafalgar Square, CAPA held a rally against the abuse of psychiatry in the USSR. In 1978, Royal College of Psychiatrists established the Special Committee on abuse of psychiatry. 20 December 1980 saw the formation in Paris of the International Association on the Political Use of Psychiatry (IAPUP) whose first secretary was Gérard Bles of France. Since the Congress in Honolulu in 1978, he has inspired the movement against the use of psychiatry for political ends.

== Honolulu Congress ==
In 1975, the American Psychiatric Association agreed to host the WPA's sixth World Congress of Psychiatry during 28 August – 3 September 1977, in Honolulu. The request to discuss the Soviet issue during the World Congress of the World Psychiatric Association in Honolulu was made by Americans and the British and was supported by other societies.

On 10 September 1976, Chairman of the KGB Yuri Andropov submitted to the Central Committee of the Communist Party of the Soviet Union his report informing of "anti-Soviet campaign with nasty fabrications regarding the alleged use psychiatry in the USSR as an instrument in the political struggle with 'dissidents'." The report alleged that the campaign was a carefully planned anti-Soviet action in which a noticeable part was played by the British Royal College of Psychiatrists under the influence of pro-Zionist elements and that the KGB was undertaking measures through operational channels to counter hostile attacks. In October 1976, the Ministry of Health constituted a special working group to develop a plan of action for a counter campaign. The working group had among its members leading Soviet psychiatrists Andrei Snezhnevsky, Georgi Morozov, Marat Vartanyan, and Eduard Babayan under the chairmanship of Deputy Minister of Health Dmitri Venediktov. The plans they worked out consisted in, inter alia, compiling documents with counterarguments for being spread before and during the World Congress; actively lobbying the media for explaining the human nature of Soviet medicine; actively lobbying inside the World Psychiatric Association for preventing the issue from being put on the agenda; lobbying the World Health Organization for exerting pressure on the WPA not to allow this unacceptable anti-Soviet campaign; and establishing closer working relations with positively inclined colleagues in the West. In February 1977, representatives of the secret services of the USSR, the German Democratic Republic (GDR), Poland, Hungary, Czechoslovakia, Bulgaria, and Cuba met in Moscow to talk about a common approach to the issue of political abuse psychiatry and the upcoming World Congress in Honolulu. This meeting was mainly chaired by Major General Ivan Pavlovich Abramov, deputy head of the Fifth Directorate of the KGB (which dealt, inter alia, with dissenters), with the support of deputy head of the First Division of the Fifth Directorate Colonel Romanov who, according to the report, would travel with the Soviet delegation to Honolulu as "political advisor". The minutes of the meeting demonstrate that Western preparations for the Honolulu World Congress were under the Soviet concern in which the leading part was played by the KGB of the Soviet Union. Not long before the World Congress, a high-level conference was held in East Berlin, and the Soviet psychiatric leaders met with colleagues from Czechoslovakia, Poland, the GDR, Hungary, and Bulgaria to coordinate their positions. Much to the vexation of Georgi Morozov, the Romanians did not come to this meeting, while both the Hungarians and the Poles openly criticized the Soviet stance.

However, all this activity of the Soviets could not prevent the issue from dominating the Congress from the very outset. At the first plenary session of the Congress, the introduction of the Declaration of Hawaii took place. This statement of ethical principles of psychiatry had been drafted by the Ethical Sub-Committee of the Executive Committee established in 1973 in response to the increasing number of protests against using psychiatry for non-medical reasons. One of the principles stated in the Declaration was that a psychiatrist must not take part in compulsory psychiatric treatment in the absence of mental disease, and the Declaration also included other clauses which could be considered as heaving a bearing on the political abuse psychiatry. The General Assembly accepted the Declaration of Hawaii without difficulty, and without opposition by the Delegation of the Soviets. However, the Declaration was later criticized by Hanfried Helmchen, who found its ethical guideline No 1 to be misleading and stated that when health, personal autonomy and growth—without referring to mental illness—were formulated as the direct aim of psychiatry, the menace of vast expansion of psychiatry would increase and that the renunciation of an illness concept appeared to be an essential source for the 'total psychiatrisation of everybody and everything' which was also deplored by Blomquist in his commentary. At the plenary session, an Ethics Committee was also established under the chairmanship of Costas Stephanis from Greece; among the members was Marat Vartanyan from the USSR.

The Soviet issue passed the General Assembly less easily. The Soviets did all possible to prove their point, and according to the report of the Soviet delegation, Marat Vartanyan had successfully prevented former Soviet political prisoner Leonid Plyushch from being registered as a delegate at the Congress and "anti-Soviet materials" from being spread in the main congress hall. In 1977 at the World Congress in Honolulu, Snezhnevsky again defended psychiatric practices used in his country. Two motions were put to the vote, a British one condemning the systematic political abuse of psychiatry in the USSR and an American one calling on the World Psychiatric Association to constitute a review committee to investigate the allegations of political abuse of psychiatry. The British resolution passed with 90 to 88 votes and only because the Poles did not come and the Russians, having been tardy in their dues payments, were not allowed to cast all votes allocated to them. Some regarded the resolution as a Pyrrhic victory.

On 31 August 1977, the General Assembly of the World Psychiatric Association during its meeting in Honolulu for the VI World Congress of Psychiatry adopted the following resolution:

That the WPA take note of the abuse of psychiatry for political purposes and that it condemn those practices in all countries where they occur and call upon the professional organisations of psychiatrists in those countries to renounce and expunge those practices from their country, and that the WPA implement this Resolution in the first instance in reference to the extensive evidence of the systematic abuse of psychiatry for political purposes in the USSR.

This resolution of the WPA is unprecedented in that it was the first time that an international professional association specifically condemned a great power. This resolution was the climax of a lengthy campaign in the West to expose the Soviet practice of committing some of its political and other dissenters to mental hospitals. The allegations, confirmed by some Soviet psychiatrists who had fled or emigrated to the West, induced the World Psychiatric Association to condemn the USSR for the "systematic abuse of psychiatry for political purposes." Kremlin spokesmen ignored the action as a provocation "by a handful of antipsychiatric and antisocial elements" and began a propaganda campaign to contradict the accusations. The American resolution requesting to set up a Review Committee received a larger majority of votes, 121 votes against 66. Snezhnevsky returned to Moscow wounded, with members of his delegation putting the blame for their defeat on the "Zionists."

1978 saw a public statement made by Soviet psychiatrist Yuri Novikov, who was the head of a section of the Serbsky Institute for six years and first secretary of the Association of Soviet Psychiatrists until he left the Soviet Union in June 1977. In his statement, he said that political abuses of psychiatry took place in the Soviet Union and that it was not the scale of this that mattered, but the fact that it existed.

== UN Principles for the Protection of Persons with Mental Illness ==
Political abuse of psychiatry in the Soviet Union catalyzed a more general investigation into international psychiatric practices by the UN Commission on Human Rights. In 1977, the Commission created a "Sub-Commission to study, with a view to formulating guidelines, if possible, the question of the protection of those detained on the grounds of mental ill-health against treatment that might adversely affect the human personality and its physical and intellectual integrity." The Sub-Commission subsequently appointed its two Special Rapporteurs the primary task to "determine whether adequate grounds existed for detaining persons on the grounds of mental ill-health."

The UN Principles for the Protection of Persons with Mental Illness and for the Improvement of Mental Health Care was published more than a decade later. The final version of the Principles had been so repeatedly massaged and rewritten by numerous committees dominated by psychiatrists that cross-referencing and other priorities extensively buried the primary tasks of attending to the risks of treatment and involuntary detention. In 1991, the United Nations General Assembly adopted the final document. In the view of Richard Gosden, it is principally designed to protect the rights of voluntary patients, not involuntary patients. The problems of involuntary patients are addressed by the document in a way that tends to undermine their rights rather than protect them. However, Michael Perlin believes the divulgation of the Principles has the potential to be a barrier against the type of governmental malfeasance that is epitomized by the Soviet experience. According to George Alexander, the Principles are far better than other work of the United Nations on the issue but it is unclear what effect they will have. Brendan Kelly says the Principles is a non-binding declaration.

== Review Committee ==
In August 1978, Americans donated $50,000 for the establishment of the Review Committee and, by doing so, showed their commitment to the project. The President Jules Masserman, when submitting the donation, asked that the Review Committee be established without delay "for the sake of many political dissidents at risk." In December 1978, the Review Committee was set up under the chairmanship of Canadian psychiatrist Jean-Yves Gosselin and, in August 1979, received the first complaints submitted by the British Royal College of Psychiatrists.

The proposed statute read, "The Committee to Review the Abuse of Psychiatry will be appointed by the Executive Committee and shall have the responsibility to review individual complaints. Its activities will not be limited in time."

From the very first day, the Soviets refused to recognize its existence. Originally they attempted to prevent its establishment, maintaining that it would divert the WPA from its major function, namely the exchange of scientific ideas. When the Review Committee was constituted, the Soviet society asserted overtly that they would not collaborate with the Review Committee, and they confirmed their stance in three letters, in which they claimed that the Review Committee was an "illegal formation," that they would continue not to acknowledge its existence and that no cooperation could be expected. That stance would remain unaltered over the years to come. Finally, the Review Committee was largely made powerless when the President and General Secretary of the WPA decided to bypass it and began to communicate with the Soviets directly.

However, later, at the General Assembly during the World Congress in Vienna in 1983, the status and work of the Review Committee were discussed and it was resolved to allow the committee to become statutory. The General Assembly resolved further to change the Committee scope towards complaints about not only political but any abuse of psychiatry. As it was emphasized, the WPA is not a human rights organization and the Review Committee should only examine complaints about specific acts of abuse carried out by specific psychiatrists against specific persons. The 1999 General Assembly modified the mandate of the Review Committee as follows: "The Review Committee shall review complaints and other issues and initiate investigations on the violations of the ethical guidelines for the practice of psychiatry as stated in the Declaration of Madrid and its additional guidelines in order to make recommendations to the Executive Committee as to any possible action."

== Working Commission to Investigate the Use of Psychiatry for Political Purposes ==
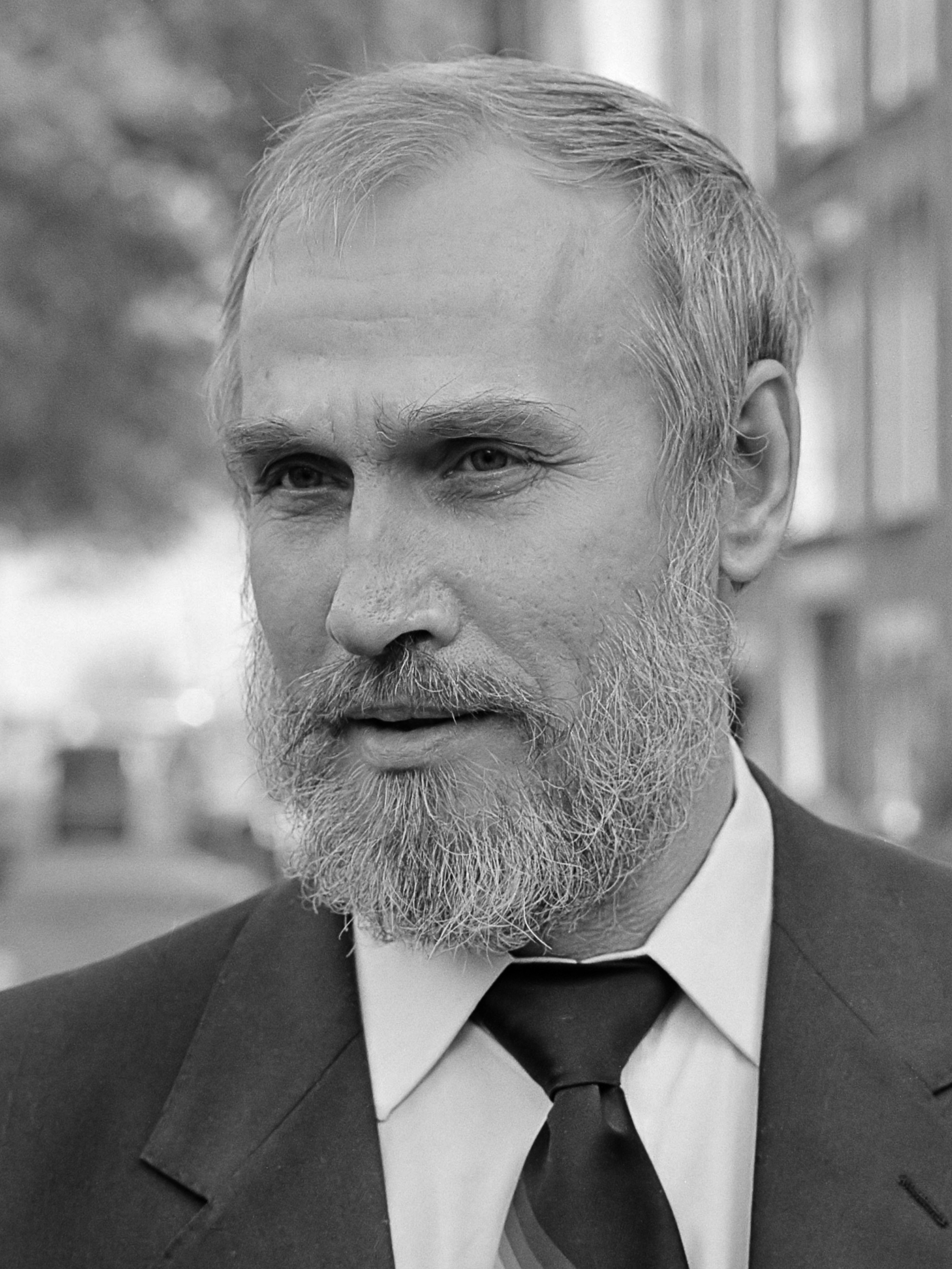
Anatoly Koryagin (b. 1938), a Russian psychiatrist, former Soviet human rights activist, political prisoner, at the Sakharov Congress in Amsterdam on 22 May 1987

In January 1977, Alexandr Podrabinek along with a 47-year-old self-educated worker Feliks Serebrov, a 30-year-old computer programmer Vyacheslav Bakhmin and Irina Kuplun established the Working Commission to Investigate the Use of Psychiatry for Political Purposes. The commission was formally linked to the Moscow Helsinki Group founded by Yuri Orlov along with ten others including Elena Bonner and Anatoly Shcharansky in 1976 to monitor Soviet compliance with the human rights provisions of the Helsinki Accords. The commission was composed of five open members and several anonymous ones, including a few psychiatrists who, at great danger to themselves, conducted their own independent examinations of cases of alleged psychiatric abuse. The leader of the commission was Alexandr Podrabinek. In 1977, he completed a book titled Punitive Medicine, a 265-page monograph covering political abuses of psychiatry in the Soviet Union and containing photographs of hospitals and former inmates, many quotations from ex-inmates, a "white list" of two hundred of prisoners of conscience in Soviet mental hospitals and a "black list" of over one hundred medical staff and doctors who took part in committing people to psychiatric facilities for political reasons.

The psychiatric consultants to the commission were Alexander Voloshanovich and Anatoly Koryagin. The task stated by the commission was not primarily to diagnose persons or to declare people who sought help mentally ill or mentally healthy. However, in some instances individuals who came for help to the commission were examined by a psychiatrist who provided help to the commission and made a precise diagnosis of their mental condition. At first it was psychiatrist Alexander Voloshanovich from the Moscow suburb of Dolgoprudny, who made these diagnoses. But when he had been compelled to emigrate on 7 February 1980, his work was continued by the Kharkov psychiatrist Anatoly Koryagin. Koryagin's contribution was to examine former and potential victims of political abuse of psychiatry by writing psychiatric diagnoses in which he deduced that the individual was not suffering from any mental disease. Those reports were employed as a means of defense: if the individual was picked up again and committed to mental hospital, the commission had vindication that the hospitalization served non-medical purposes. Also some foreign psychiatrists including the Swedish psychiatrist Harald Blomberg and British psychiatrist Gery Low-Beer helped in examining former or potential victims of psychiatric abuse. The Commission used those reports in its work and publicly referred to them when it was essential.

The commission gathered as much information as possible of victims of psychiatric terror in the Soviet Union and published this information in their Information Bulletins. For the four years of its existence, the Commission published more than 1,500 pages of documentation including 22 Information Bulletins in which over 400 cases of the political abuse of psychiatry were documented in great detail. Summaries of the Information Bulletins were published in the key samizdat publication, A Chronicle of Current Events. The Information Bulletins were sent to the Soviet officials, with request to verify the data and notify the Commission if mistakes were found, and to the West, where human rights defenders used them in the course of their campaigns. The Information Bulletins were also used to provide the dissident movement with information about Western protests against the political abuse. Peter Reddaway said that after he had studied official documents in the Soviet archives, including minutes from meetings of the Politburo of the Central Committee of the Communist Party of the Soviet Union, it became evident to him that Soviet officials at high levels paid close attention to foreign responses to these cases, and if someone was discharged, all dissidents felt the pressure had played a significant part and the more foreign pressure the better. Over fifty victims examined by psychiatrists of the Moscow Working Commission between 1977 and 1981 and the files smuggled to the West by Vladimir Bukovsky in 1971 were the material that convinced most psychiatric associations that there was distinctly something wrong in the USSR.

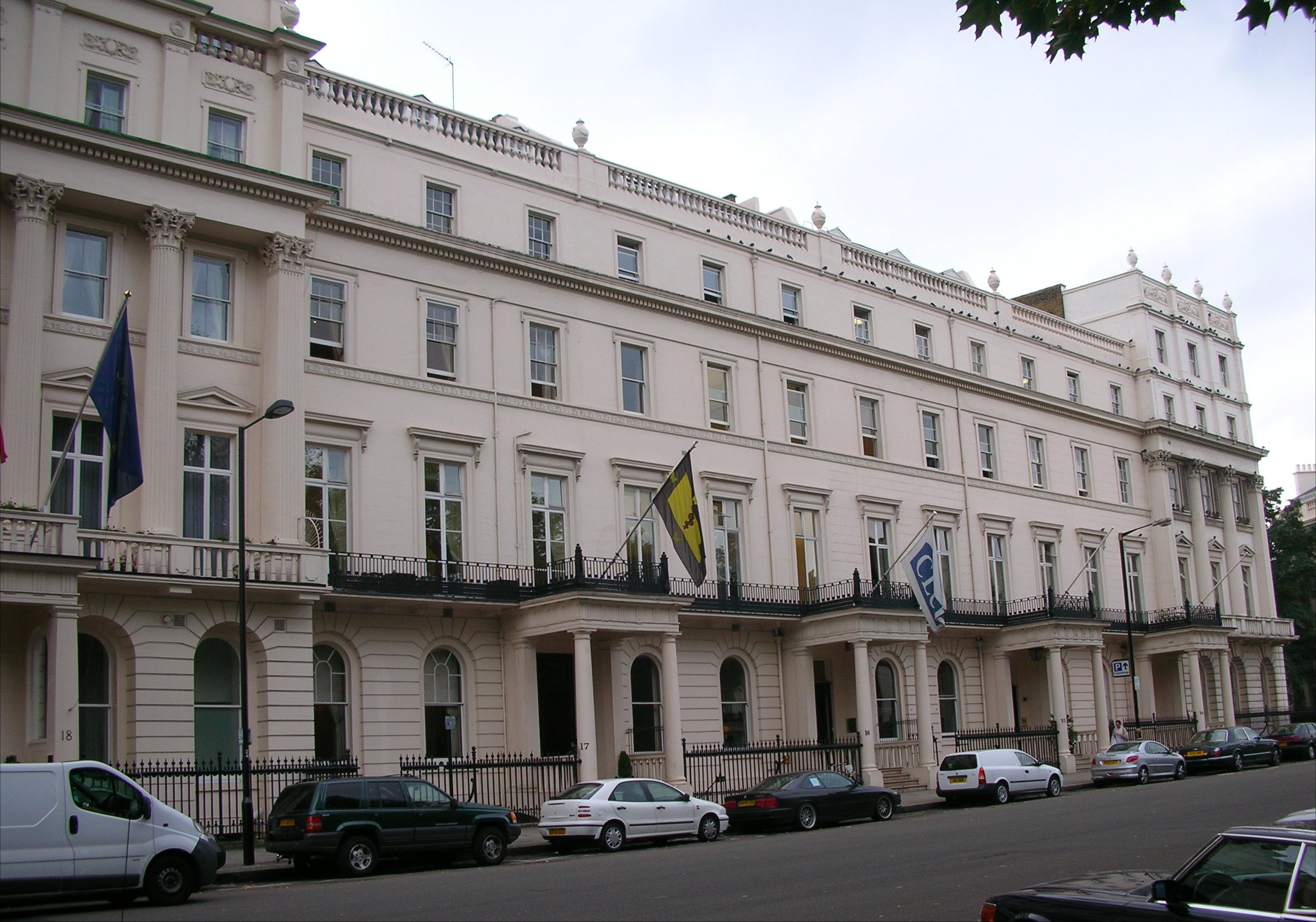
Royal College of Psychiatrists (building with yellow flag) in Belgrave Square, London

The Soviet authorities responded aggressively. Members of the group were being threatened, followed, subjected to house searches and interrogations. In the end, the members of the commission were subjected to various terms and types of punishments: Alexander Podrabinek was sentenced to 5 years' internal exile, Irina Grivnina to 5 years' internal exile, Vyacheslav Bakhmin to 3 years in a labor camp, Leonard Ternovsky to 3 years' labor camp, Anatoly Koryagin to 8 years' imprisonment and labor camp and 4 years' internal exile, Alexander Voloshanovich was sent to voluntary exile.

In the autumn of 1978, the British Royal College of Psychiatrists carried a resolution in which it reiterated its concern over the abuse of psychiatry for the suppression of dissent in the USSR and applauded the Soviet citizens, who had taken an open stance against such abuse, by expressing its admiration and support especially for Semyon Gluzman, Alexander Podrabinek, Alexander Voloshanovich, and Vladimir Moskalkov. In 1980, the Special Committee on the Political Abuse of Psychiatry, established by the Royal College of Psychiatrists in 1978, charged Snezhnevsky with involvement in the abuse and recommended that Snezhnevsky, who had been honoured as a Corresponding Fellow of the Royal College of Psychiatrists, be invited to attend the college's Court of Electors to answer criticisms because he was responsible for the compulsory detention of this celebrated dissident, Leonid Plyushch. Instead Snezhnevsky chose to resign his Fellowship.

== Resolutions for expulsion or suspension ==
On 12 August 1982, in preparation for the World Congress in Vienna, the American Psychiatric Association sent out to all member societies of the World Psychiatric Association a memorandum announcing their intention to organize a forum for discussing the issue of Soviet psychiatric abuse prior to the General Assembly in Vienna. On 18 January 1983, the Ambassador of the Soviet Union to the German Democratic Republic (GDR), Gorald Gorinovich, delivered a message from the Central Committee of the Communist Party of the Soviet Union to the Central Committee of the Socialist Unity Party of Germany in which it said that the abnormal situation which had developed within the World Psychiatric Association put in effect its whole activity in question and that for this reason, All-Union Society took the decision to withdraw from the WPA. On 22 January 1983, the British Medical Journal published a letter by Allan Wynn, the chairman of the Working Group on the Internment of Dissenters in Mental Hospitals, reporting that in consequence of the continued abuse of psychiatry in the Soviet Union the American, British, French, Danish, Norwegian, Swiss, and Australasian member societies of the World Psychiatric Association with the support indicated by many of its other members proposed resolutions for the expulsion or suspension of membership of the Soviet Society of Neurologists and Psychiatrists, which would be considered at the World Congress of the World Psychiatric Association in Vienna in July 1983. On 31 January 1983, the All-Union Society officially resigned from the World Psychiatric Association under threat of expulsion. In their letter of resignation, the Soviets complained about a "slanderous campaign, blatantly political in nature... directed against Soviet psychiatry in the spirit of the 'cold war' against the Soviet Union" and, being especially angry about the memorandum of the American Psychiatric Association of August 1982, charged the WPA leadership with complicity by not having spoken out against this mailing.

According to the reports on hearing before the Subcommittee on Human Rights and International Organizations of the Committee on Foreign Affairs and the Commission on Security and Cooperation in Europe on 20 September 1983, the national associations justly held the opinion that 10 years of mild public protests, quiet diplomacy, and private conversations with Soviet official psychiatrists had produced no significant change in the level of Soviet abuses, and that this approach had, thereby, failed. In January 1983, the number of member associations of the World Psychiatry Association, voting for the suspension or expulsion of the Soviet Union, rose to nine. Inasmuch as these associations would have half the votes in the WPA governing body, the Soviets was now, in January, almost sure to be voted out in July.

According to the statement made by the chairman of the APA Committee on International Abuse of Psychiatry and Psychiatrists Harold Visotsky at the hearing, the committee on behalf of certain persons had written hundreds of letters to the USSR, including those to authorities of the Soviet Government, to patients themselves, the families of patients, the psychiatrists who were treating these patients, but only indirectly heard from the families of patients and had never received a response from the authorities. In the statement, he mentioned that 20 cases were referred over to the World Psychiatric Association for further investigation by their committee to review alleged abuses of psychiatry for political purposes and a number of these cases were sent to the All Union Society of Neuropathologists and Psychiatrists of the USSR for clarification and response, but when months and months went by and the World Psychiatric Association had received no response from Soviet colleagues, the American Psychiatric Association and a number of other psychiatric associations across the world carried a resolution which stated:

If the All-Union Society of Psychiatrists and Neuropathologists of the USSR does not adequately respond to all enquiries from the World Psychiatric Association regarding the issue of psychiatric abuse in that country by 1 April 1983, that the All-Union Society should be suspended from membership in the World Psychiatric Association until such time that these abuses cease to exist.

== Vienna Congress ==
The Seventh World Congress of the WPA was scheduled to meet on 10 – 16 July 1983, at Vienna where heated discussion and a close vote on the resolutions were anticipated. The General Assembly of the World Psychiatric Association in Vienna was likely one of the most tense and disorganized meetings in its existence. Some delegates, especially those from Israel, Mexico, Egypt, Cuba, and the GDR angrily appealed to the WPA Executive Committee not to accept the resignation of the Soviets, whereas others voiced the view that it was a fact of life one had to live with, an opinion supported by the WPA President Pierre Pichot. The debate was preceded by a discussion of various resolutions which had been submitted, but the state of affairs was so perplexing that some delegates did not even know which resolution they were asked to vote upon. Finally a resolution drafted by the British delegate Kenneth Rawnsley, who served as the fourth president of the Royal College of Psychiatrists from 1981 to 1984, was carried by 174 votes to 18, with 27 abstentions. The resolution was strikingly conciliatory in tone:

The World Psychiatric Association would welcome the return of the All-Union Society of Neuropathologists and Psychiatrists of the USSR to membership of the Association, but would expect sincere co-operation and concrete evidence beforehand of amelioration of the political abuse psychiatry in the Soviet Union.

== Releases ==
The freedoms of the Gorbachev period diminished the human rights movement because many of their decades-long concerns such as suppression of free expression, imprisonment of dissidents, and psychiatric abuse were no longer the main problems facing Soviet society. 1986 saw the discharge of nineteen political prisoners from mental hospitals. In 1987, sixty-four political prisoners were discharged from mental hospitals.

In 1987, the Italian Radical Party organized a conference against political abuse of psychiatry, and Robert van Voren along with Leonid Plyushch were speakers at the event. The large room in a rather posh hotel in Rome was completely empty. "When will people come?" the speakers asked and were given the answer, "They will not come. It is all arranged for radio broadcasts, and we will imagine that there are people here." The speakers alone were in the empty room, after their every speech the sound of applause was added and, as a result, listeners were under the impression that the party held a large successful congress in Rome.

In 1988, hundreds of thousands of persons with mental disorders were removed from the psychiatric register at psychoneurological dispensaries and discharged from psychiatric hospitals to the satisfaction of world public and the World Psychiatric Association.

In early 1988, Chief Psychiatrist Aleksandr Churkin stated in an interview with Corriere della Sera issued on 5 April 1988 that 5.5 million Soviet citizens were on the psychiatric register and that within two years 30% would be removed from this list. However, a year later the journal Ogoniok published a figure of 10.2 million provided by the state statistics committee. In 1990, Zhurnal Nevropatologii i Psikhiatrii Imeni S S Korsakova published almost the same figure of 10 million people registered at psychoneurological dispensaries and 335,200 hospital beds used in the Soviet Union by 1987. At a press conference held in Moscow on 27 October 1989, Gennady Milyokhin claimed that of the three hundred patients named by international human rights organizations, "practically all had left hospital."

== Visit of the US delegation ==
In 1989, the stonewalling of Soviet psychiatry was overcome by perestroika and glasnost (meaning "policy of transparency" in Russian). Over the objection of the psychiatric establishment, the Soviet government permitted a delegation of psychiatrists from the US, representing the United States government, to carry out extensive interviews of suspected victims of abuse. They traveled to the Soviet Union on 25 February 1989. The group consisted of about 25 people among whom were William Farrand of the State Department; Loren H. Roth as head of the psychiatric team; psychiatrists of the National Institute of Mental Health, including Scientific Director of the US Delegation Darrel A. Regier, Harold Visotsky from Chicago as head of the hospital visit team, and four émigré Soviet psychiatrists living in the United States. There also were State Department interpreters, two attorneys, Ellen Mercer of the American Psychiatric Association and Peter Reddaway.

The visit was initiated by Soviet government officials, including Andrei Kovalyov, on domestic political grounds. A powerful external impact was needed to have reasons to give a new spurt to restructuring psychiatry. The main thing was to make the decision to develop an effective law that would strictly regulate all aspects of the provision of psychiatric care and prevent new political abuses of the keepers of ideological purity in Soviet community who wore white gowns. No less important task was to release the maximum number of political and religious prisoners from psychiatric hospitals. Something that seemed to Soviet psychiatric leaders to be impossible had to be promised to them so that they agree to conduct such an event. To that end, the government officials played up the need for the visit in every possible way by using the argument that its success, if any, would enable to resume Soviet membership in the World Psychiatric Association. The psychiatric leaders swallowed the bait. Later on, Andrei Kovalyov wrote about the attempts to intimidate him by psychiatric measures during the preparation of the event.

The American psychiatrists were primarily interested in patients who had passed through psychiatric examinations at the Serbsky Institute. Their clinical charts were classified secrets. The psychiatric examinations were conducted by academicians and eminent professors. In the clinical charts, there were monstrous things: for example, one of the patients was refused to be discharged from the hospital until he had renounced his religious convictions, for which he was hospitalized. During their visit to the USSR, the American psychiatrists acquainted themselves with cases that included such "crimes": human rights activism, the Ukrainian Helsinki Group (an outburst of emotion while being inside a social security agency; a visit to the apartment of Andrei Sakharov that was formerly human rights activism; having written a book about poet Vladimir Vysotsky and other anti-Soviet essays; distributing books by Alexander Solzhenitsyn, Alexander Zinoviev, Zhores Medvedev; defending the rights of persons with disabilities, signing appeals, etc.). Of course, among patients surveyed by Americans were also terrorists and murderers.

The delegation was able systematically to interview and assess present and past involuntarily admitted mental patients chosen by the visiting team, as well as to talk over procedures and methods of treatment with some of the patients, their friends, relatives and, sometimes, their treating psychiatrists. Whereas the delegation originally sought interviews with 48 persons, it eventually saw 15 hospitalized and 12 discharged patients. About half of the hospitalized patients were released in the two months between the submission of the initial list of names to the Soviets authorities and the departure from the Soviet Union of the US delegation. The delegation came to the conclusion that nine of the 15 hospitalized patients had disorders which would be classified in the United States as serious psychoses, diagnoses corresponding broadly with those used by the Soviet psychiatrists. One of the hospitalized patients had been diagnosed as having schizophrenia although the US team saw no evidence of mental disorder. Among the 12 discharged patients examined, the US delegation found that nine had no evidence of any current or past mental disorder; the remaining three had comparatively slight symptoms which would not usually warrant involuntary commitment in Western countries. According to medical record, all these patients had diagnoses of psychopathology or schizophrenia.

When returned home after a visit of more than two weeks, the delegation wrote its report which was pretty damaging to the Soviet authorities. The delegation established not only that there had taken place systematic political abuse of psychiatry but also that the abuse had not come to an end, that victims of the abuse still remained in mental hospitals, and that the Soviet authorities and particularly the Soviet Society of Psychiatrists and Neuropathologists still denied that psychiatry had been employed as a method of repression. On 17 July 1989, William Farrand, Peter Reddaway, and Darrel Regier expounded the findings of their report in the TV interview Psychiatric Practices in the Soviet Union broadcast by C-SPAN. The report was published in Schizophrenia Bulletin, Supplement to Vol. 15, No. 4, 1989. The report by the American psychiatrists, who inspected a number of Soviet psychiatric hospitals in March 1989, remained secret for all ordinary psychiatrists of the country. It reached the point of absurdity when the administration of the special hospitals visited by the American doctors sent the WPA a request to send them the report from the USA. The American part has translated the obtained Soviet reply into Russian but even the action has not made the USSR Health Ministry declassify the documents. As far as Robert van Voren could establish, the report was never published in the USSR. Only after twenty years, in 2009, the report was translated into Russian, and its Russian version was published not in Russia but in the Netherlands, on the website of the Global Initiative on Psychiatry.

== Establishing the IPA ==
In 1989, the Independent Psychiatric Association of Russia (IPA) was created as an association publicly opposing itself to official Soviet psychiatry and its offspring, the All-Union Society of Neuropathologists and Psychiatrists, which was completely under the control of the Soviet government and implemented its political principles. From the very beginning, the IPA and its President Yuri Savenko had to take on human rights functions in addition to educational ones: first, it was necessary to uncover the ideological basis on which the Soviet psychiatry carried out its punitive activities; second, it was necessary to develop legal norms which would forever prevent such abuses; third, it was necessary to show that it is not society that needs to be protected from the mentally ill, but the ill need to be protected from society as a whole, not only from the authorities; fourth, it was necessary to overcome rigidity and inhumane nature of modern domestic psychiatry detached from its old roots and, at the same time, artificially isolated from Western humanistic trends.

In Russia, the IPA is the sole non-governmental professional organization that makes non-forensic psychiatric expert examination at the request of citizens whose rights have been violated with the use of psychiatry.

== Athens Congress ==
In the months prior to the Eighth World Psychiatric Assembly in Athens, there was substantial dispute about the possible readmittance of the All-Union Society to the WPA. The Eighth World Congress of the World Psychiatric Association was held between 12 and 19 October 1989 in Athens. The Congress was reminiscent of the previous World Congress in 1983 in Vienna, and the one before that in 1977 in Honolulu. The issue of the Soviet political abuse of psychiatry raised its ugly head, and dominated the WPA proceedings.

On 16 October, the Soviet delegation convened a press conference. The panel was uniformly evasive and defensive. After a detailed and lengthy account by Karpov of Soviet psychiatric reforms in which he emphasized the specialities of the new mental health legislation and in particular the legal safeguards for patients, other panellists worked out on what they considered as positive aspects of the new developments. However then, abruptly, this sense of optimism was disrupted by the bluntest of questions posed by Anatoly Koryagin: Had political psychiatric abuse occurred or not? Alexander Tiganov, who played a prominent part in the press conference, answered hesitatingly that "such cases" could have taken place during the period of stagnation "but there was a need to distinguish between psychiatric, legal and political aspects." Koryagin persevered with his challenge and countered that these answers failed to clarify whether an acknowledgment was being made that Soviet psychiatry had been misused for political reasons.

Koryagin stated that the readmission would offer carte blanche to the KGB to continue its repressive practices, that there would be further abuse of psychiatry, and that the plight of prisoners would be hopeless. He proposed the four conditions for the readmission:

1. Soviet psychiatrists must acknowledge previous political abuses and reject them;
2. all detainees must be released;
3. participation in monitoring of future practice must be obligatory;
4. and representatives of the World Psychiatric Association must be permitted to function freely on Soviet territory.

Several national associations, including the Royal College of Psychiatrists, the Australasian College, the Swiss Psychiatric Association, and the West German Psychiatric Association insisted that the Soviet Society should not be admitted until specific conditions had been satisfied; these included the release of all dissidents unjustifiably detained in psychiatric hospitals, and the dissociation by the authorities from the past abuse and their obligation to prevent its repetition.

The WPA Executive Committee decided to organize the Extraordinary General Assembly for the debate between the Soviet dissident psychiatrist Dr. Semyon Gluzman and the representatives of the Soviet delegation. After that, it was said, by the lips of the President of the Congress, a Greek psychiatrist Costas Stefanis, that the debate could not take place because Gluzman represented nobody, did not officially work as a psychiatrist and was not a member of the Independent Psychiatric Association in Moscow. A few hours later, Gluzman managed to have himself presented by Yuri Savenko. The meeting of the General Assembly turned out to be secret, even the press that was officially accredited under the WPA General Assembly was removed from the room. It was followed by something of the trial against the official Soviet psychiatry. The situation was quite unbalanced, to put it mildly. The six or seven members of the Russian delegation were seated in a row on the stage. As a result, there were no more available seats on the stage, and, thus, Gluzman and his interpreter had to stand at the foot of the stage, at least a meter below. It looked like seven against one and gave the visual impression of a lost battle. However, many members of the Congress sympathized with Gluzman, who agreed to participate in the debate with the Soviet delegation. In addition, the Soviet representatives made a very bad impression, repeating the standard Soviet propaganda that was completely opposing what had already been published in the Soviet press. Gluzman, on his part, was in his best shape. His story was not only sharp and clear but also he even showed compassion to the Soviet representatives who sat on the stage high above him. Perhaps, the WPA hoped that the debate would make opinions change in favour of the Soviets but the opposite happened. It has strengthened the view of their opponents that too few changes occurred in Soviet psychiatry to allow the return of the Soviet Society and that their statements were still dominated by lies.

When it came to the climax, almost all Soviet psychiatrists, including Marat Vartanyan, were ignored by the Congress, and the leading role in the Soviet delegation has been now openly taken by not a psychiatrist but the diplomat Yuri Reshetov, the Deputy Foreign Affairs Minister of the Soviet Union. It is clear that the game is now being played at the highest level with the direct participation of the political elite in Moscow. On the other part, there has been formed the small group of negotiators composed of a British delegate and the President of the Royal College James Birley, a Dutch delegate Roelof ten Doesschate, an American delegate Harold Visotsky, and a German delegate Johannes Meyer-Lindenberg. The situation was unique: the World Congress is continuing, the press is agog, the WPA Executive Committee has been moved to the side, and the four delegates are carrying on negotiations with Yuri Reshetov, who is in constant contact with Moscow, receiving instructions. In this way, the "full independence" of Soviet psychiatry from the state apparatus has once again been demonstrated.

The WPA Executive Committee moved the Soviet issue to the end of the agenda. At first, they conducted long debates about the whole range of procedural problems, small amendments to statutes and other issues, then they went on to the elections of the WPA Executive Committee that led to a stir. Fini Schulzinger, the incumbent General Secretary, decided to run for the presidency. Candidates were asked to submit their nominations and accompany them by a short speech and explanation why they would be the best choice. Schulzinger went first. His speech began quietly, but soon he got excited, especially when it came to the issue of the membership of the Soviets. To the surprise of delegates, he accused his contestants of being funded by the CIA and led by the Church of Scientology. The audience totally went silent, they have never seen anything like this before. To the contestant of Schulzinger, the race has been won: Jorge Alberto Costa e Silva has been elected as the WPA President by the overwhelming majority.

The negotiations with the Soviets continued even during the General Assembly. They were offered the last chance: if they want to return, they have to read out the message that they plead guilty; otherwise, they will not have been admitted. The intensive communication with Moscow did not stop, the negotiations of the statement started, and each word was discussed.

The Soviet delegation to the 1989 World Congress of the WPA in Athens eventually agreed to admit that the systematic abuse of psychiatry for political purposes had indeed taken place in their country. At the Congress, the Soviet Society's International Secretary Pyotr Morozov on behalf of his delegation made a statement containing the following five points, which are quoted in full:

1. The All-Union Society of Psychiatrists and Narcologists publicly acknowledges that previous political conditions created an environment in which psychiatric abuse occurred for non-medical, including political, reasons.
2. Victims of abuse shall have their cases reviewed within the USSR and also in cooperation with the WPA, and the registry shall not be used against psychiatric patients.
3. The All-Union Society unconditionally accepts the WPA review instrument.
4. The All-Union Society supports the changes in the Soviet law with full implementation relevant to the practice of psychiatry and the treatment and protection of the rights of the mentally ill.
5. The All-Union Society encourages an enlightened leadership in the psychiatric professional community.

Felice Lieh Mak, just chosen as President-Elect, proposed a resolution which included the statement read by Morozov, and then adding that within one year the Review Committee should visit the Soviet Union and that if evidence of continued political abuse of psychiatry were to be found, a special meeting of the General Assembly should be convoked to give consideration to suspension of membership of the Soviets. In the end, 291 votes were cast for the resolution, 45 against, with 19 abstentions. The Soviets were readmitted to the WPA under conditions and on the ground of having made a public confession of the existence of previous psychiatric abuse and having given a commitment to review any present or subsequent cases and to sustain and introduce reforms to the psychiatric system and new mental health legislation.

There is no question of the morality of the WPA position. The hand of friendship was extended to not thousands of ordinary Soviet psychiatrists but all the same "leading specialists" who had doomed healthy people to the torments of forced treatment. They have been charitably offered to voluntarily reeducate themselves and to lead a new, perestroika-oriented psychiatry; however, what morality can be spoken of when among the members of the WPA were left Romania and the Republic of South Africa, which abused psychiatry for political purposes? On the other hand, they voted not for Vartanyan and Zharikov, not for the sad memory of Lunts but for Gorbachev and rather wanted to help the processes of humanization in the USSR. They hoped that the membership Soviet psychiatrists in the WPA would help to keep them under control.

Deeply shocked, Anatoly Koryagin, who had considered the statement by the Soviets as completely hypocritical and insincere and had not thought that the Soviets would be permitted to return, officially renounced his Honorary Membership of the WPA by submitting on 8 November 1989 to the WPA General Secretary a short letter:

On 17th October 1989 the All Union Society of Psychiatrists and Narcologists of the USSR, which counts among its members criminal psychiatrists, guilty of psychiatric abuses for political purposes, was readmitted to the World Psychiatric Association. As I do not wish to be a member of an organization together with that kind of persons, I renounce the honorary membership of the World Psychiatric Association, which I held since 1983.

The Soviet delegates returned to Moscow jubilantly. At the Moscow airport, they told the press that there have not been and are no abuses of psychiatry in the Soviet Union and that the USSR has been admitted to the WPA firmly and unconditionally. In an interview with a Soviet television crew, Marat Vartanyan replied to the question whether any conditions had been set to a Soviet return:

No, that is wrong information, which you received from somewhere. There were no conditions. We set the conditions. That is, we proposed… eh… the Executive Committee of the WPA to come to us on an official visit to the Soviet Union within a year.

The next day, the government newspaper Izvestiya carried a report on 19 October which did not mention any of the conditions while asserting that the All Union Society had been granted full membership. The dissemination of disinformation on the part of the Soviets had distinctly not yet come to an end. Only on 27 October 1989, Meditsinskaya Gazeta reported the conditions set by the WPA General Assembly. When more than a year and a half has passed since the decision of the Athens Congress to re-admit the Soviets to the WPA, leading psychiatrists in the USSR continued to deny that abuse took place.

The 1983–1989 years with perfect clearness confirmed the fact that psychiatry is politics regardless of whether someone likes the fact or not. The WPA leadership expanded that they tried not to admit politics to psychiatry, but for all that the result of their actions and their secret negotiations with the Moscow psychiatric leadership was exactly opposing: it has given the green light to carefully organized interventions from the Moscow political leadership supported by the active participation of the Stasi and the KGB.

== Visit of the WPA delegation ==
The WPA team spent three weeks in the Soviet Union, from 9 to 29 June 1991,and saw ten cases, all of which had been diagnosed by Soviet psychiatrists as having schizophrenia. When reviewed case notes and the results of their own interviews, the WPA team confirmed the diagnosis of schizophrenia only in one case and reported that there was still a wide gap between Soviet criteria for the diagnosis of schizophrenia and those used internationally in other countries. Of the six individuals committed to a Special Psychiatric Hospital, four of the cases were distinctly of a political nature and of these four, three had never been mentally sick.

In a letter sent in 1991 to Aleksandr Tiganov, the new chairman of the All Union Society (or, the now called themselves, the Federation of Societies of Psychiatrists and Narcologists of the Commonwealth of Independent States), the WPA General Secretary Juan José Lopez Ibor wrote that the All Union Society made in the General Assembly a Statement that included five items, several of which was not yet fulfilled, and that thereby, the Executive Committee unanimously agreed that it would not recommend continuing membership of the society in June 1993. Less than two months after the visit of the team to the Soviet Union, a coup against Mikhail Gorbachev was carried out. The coup failed and was followed by the dissolution of the USSR. As a consequence, the All Union Society remained without a country to represent. The USSR Federation of Psychiatrists and Narcologists officially resigned from the World Psychiatric Association in October 1992.

== Russian Mental Health Law ==
In Russia, the enactment of its Mental Health Law took place under dramatic circumstances despite the need for the Law because of an 80-year delay, after which the Law passed by Russia as against all developed countries, and despite dimensions of political abuse of psychiatry which were unprecedented in history and were being persistently denied for two decades from 1968 to 1988. When Soviet rule was coming to an end, the decision to develop the Mental Health Law was taken from above and under the threat of economic sanctions from the United States. An initiator of creating a serious, detailed mental health law in the USSR was a deputy of the last convocation of the Supreme Soviet of the USSR, a young engineer from a Uralian town. When asked why he as an engineer needs it, he replied to Semyon Gluzman, "All this democracy will soon run out, guys who will come to power, will start repression, and you, Dr. Gluzman, and I will have a hard time. So let's at least get these guys blocked from this possibility and adopt a civilized law eliminating the possibility of psychiatric repression!" At a meeting held by the Health Committee of the Supreme Soviet of the USSR in the autumn of 1991, the Law was approved, particularly in the speeches by the four members of the WPA commission, but this event was followed by the dissolution of the Soviet Union.

In 1992, a new commission was created under the Supreme Soviet of the Russian Federation and used a new concept of developing the Law; a quarter of the commission members were the representatives of the IPA. The Law has been put in force since 1 January 1993. Adoption of the Law On Psychiatric Care and Guarantees of Citizens' Rights during Its Provision is regarded as an epoch-making event in the history of domestic psychiatry, as establishing the legal basis for psychiatric care, and, first of all, mediating all involuntary measures through judicial procedure. That is a major post-Soviet achievement of Russian psychiatry and the foundation for a basically new attitude to the mentally ill as persons reserving all their civil and political rights and freedoms. In 1993, when the IPA printed the Law in 50 thousand copies for the general reader, quite a number of heads of the Moscow psychoneurologic dispensaries refused to circulate the Law. Over time, these difficulties were overcome. It became obligatory to know the Law to pass the certification exam.

However, article 38, which was once included in the Law as a guarantee of keeping the whole Law for patients of psychiatric hospitals, is still not working, and, as a result, the service independent of health authorities to defend rights of patients in psychiatric hospitals is still not created.

Over five years, from 1998 to 2003, the Serbsky Center made three attempts to submit for the Duma readings of amendments and additions to the Law, but the IPA and general public managed to successfully challenge these amendments, and they were finally tabled. In 2004, proponents of mental health reform could hardly prevent the effort by the doctors of the Serbsky Institute for Social and Forensic Psychiatry to roll back some reforms in Russia's landmark 1992 law on mental health. In 2004, Pavel Tishchenko said that government, with fright in a sense, copied many provisions of Western standards concerning the patients' rights into Russian legislation and included the right to get information, the right to choose a doctor in Fundamentals of Health Legislation. After the embarrassment of the 1990s, when Russian Constitution and many laws have been invested—mainly from abroad—with very good principles that protect the rights of individual citizens, including patients, now a reversal is underway.

In Andrei Kovalyov's words, the main thing is that sufficient success was achieved in stopping the psychiatric oprichnina by political and legislative means during perestroika. Can it be reborn? Certainly. Those who consider themselves "statists" (that is those for whom the state is everything and a person is nothing), at least, would not surely object to this. It took years of intense struggle to eliminate punitive psychiatry. For its rebirth, it is enough to have not even evil will (which though cannot be ruled out, especially on the part of those who would improve their positions in society and get more power in that way) but a simple thoughtlessness, error, blunder.

== See also ==
- Political abuse of psychiatry in the Soviet Union
- The Protest Psychosis: How Schizophrenia Became a Black Disease

== Sources ==
=== Archival sources ===
- "Выписка из протокола № 151 заседания Политбюро ЦК КПСС от 22 января 1970 года" [The extract from the minutes No. 151 of the meeting of the Politburo of the Central Committee of the Communist Party of the Soviet Union of 22 January 1970] (PDF) (in Russian). Soviet Archives, collected by Vladimir Bukovsky. 22 January 1970. Archived (PDF) from the original on 14 May 2012.
- "Documents on the Political Abuse of Psychiatry in the USSR". Human Rights Watch Records, Record Group 7: Helsinki Watch, 1952-2003 (Bulk, 1978-1994) HR# 0002. Series VII: Chris Panico Files, 1979-1992. Columbia University Libraries, Archival Collection:Rare Book and Manuscript Library Collections. Archived from the original on 12 March 2012.

=== Government publications and official reports ===
- Abuse of psychiatry for political repression in the Soviet Union: Hearing, Ninety-second Congress, second session, Part 1. Washington, D.C.: U.S. Government Printing Office. 1972.
- Abuse of psychiatry for political repression in the Soviet Union: Hearing, Ninety-second Congress, second session, Volume 2. Washington, D.C.: U.S. Government Printing Office. 1975.
- Abuse of psychiatry in the Soviet Union: hearing before the Subcommittee on Human Rights and International Organizations of the Committee on Foreign Affairs and the Commission on Security and Cooperation in Europe, House of Representatives, Ninety-eighth Congress, first session, September 20, 1983. Washington, D.C.: U.S. Government Printing Office. 1984.
- Americas Watch (1984). Human Rights Watch. Americas Watch. p. 67.
- Amnesty International (1983). Political abuse of psychiatry in the USSR. Amnesty International. p. 1.
- Amnesty International French Medical Commission and Valérie Marange (1991). Doctors and torture: resistance or collaboration?. Bellew Pub. ISBN 0947792562.
- British Medical Association (1992). Medicine betrayed: the participation of doctors in human rights abuses. Zed Books. ISBN 1-85649-104-8.
- Fitzpatrick, Catherine (1988). Soviet abuse of psychiatry for political purposes: A Helsinki Watch report. U.S. Helsinki Watch Committee. p. 3.
- International Association on the Political Use of Psychiatry, Working Group on the Internment of Dissenters in Mental Hospitals (1983). Soviet Political Psychiatry: The Story of the Opposition. London: International Association on the Political Use of Psychiatry, Working Group on the Internment of Dissenters in Mental Hospitals.
- Psychiatric abuse of political prisoners in the Soviet Union: testimony by Leonid Plyushch: hearing before the Subcommittee on International Organizations of the Committee on International Relations, House of Representatives, Ninety-fourth Congress, second session, March 30, 1976. Washington, D.C.: U.S. Government Printing Office. 1976.
- Reform and human rights: the Gorbachev record. Washington, D.C.: U.S. Government Printing Office. 1988.
- Review of the 37th session and upcoming 38th session of the U.N. Commission on Human Rights: hearing before the Subcommittee on Human Rights and International Organizations of the Committee on Foreign Affairs, House of Representatives, ninety-seventh congress, first session, November 16, 1981. Washington, D.C.: U.S. Government Printing Office. 1982.
- Royal College of Psychiatrists, World Psychiatric Association (1991). Report by the World Psychiatric Association Team of the Visit to the Soviet Union (9–29 June 1991). London: Royal College of Psychiatrists.
- Society for International Development (1984). Development: Seeds of change, village through global order. Society for International Development. p. 19.
- U.S. Department of State, Commission on Security and Cooperation in Europe (1989). "Report of the U.S. Delegation to Assess Recent Changes in Soviet Psychiatry" (PDF). Schizophrenia Bulletin. 15 (4 Suppl): 1–79. doi:10.1093/schbul/15.suppl_1.1. PMID 2638045. Archived from the original (PDF) on 29 November 2015.
- "Report of the U.S. Delegation to Assess Recent Changes in Soviet Psychiatry (Russian translation)" (PDF) (in Russian). Global Initiative on Psychiatry. 2009 [1989]. Archived (PDF) from the original on 7 April 2014.

=== Books ===
- Artyomova, A.; Slavinsky, M.; Rar, L. [А. Артёмова, М. Славинский, Л. Рар] (1971). Казнимые сумасшествием: Сборник документальных материалов о психиатрических преследованиях инакомыслящих в СССР [The executed by madness: a collection of documentary materials about psychiatric persecutions of dissenters in the USSR] (PDF) (in Russian). Frankfurt am Main: Посев [Seeding].
- Ball, Terence; Farr, James (1984). After Marx. CUP Archive. ISBN 0-521-27661-6.
- Berman, Harold (1972). Soviet Criminal Law and Procedure: The RSFSR Codes. Harvard University Press. ISBN 0-674-82636-1.
- Besse, Antoine (2006). "La psychiatrie française et sa représentation internationale" [French psychiatry and its international image]. In Bokobza, Hervé (ed.). La psychiatrie en péril. En dépit des Etats généraux [Psychiatry in peril. Despite its general condition] (in French). ERES. pp. 187–191. ISBN 9782749206738.
- Birstein, Vadim (2004). The perversion of knowledge: the true story of the Soviet science. Westview Press. ISBN 0-8133-4280-5.
- Bloch, Sidney; Reddaway, Peter (1977). Russia's political hospitals: The abuse of psychiatry in the Soviet Union. Victor Gollancz Ltd. ISBN 0-575-02318-X.
- Bloch, Sidney; Reddaway, Peter (1985). Soviet psychiatric abuse: the shadow over world psychiatry. Westview Press. ISBN 0-8133-0209-9.
- Bonnie, Richard (2002). "Political Abuse of Psychiatry in the Soviet Union and in China: Complexities and Controversies" (PDF). Journal of the American Academy of Psychiatry and the Law. 30 (1): 136–44. PMID 11931362. Archived from the original (PDF) on 28 September 2011.
- Brintlinger, Angela; Vinitsky, Ilya (2007). Madness and the mad in Russian culture. University of Toronto Press. ISBN 978-0-8020-9140-6.
- Bukovsky, Vladimir [Владимир Буковский] (2008). Письма русского путешественника [Letters of a Russian traveler] (in Russian). Moscow & St Petersburg: Нестор-История [Nestor-History]. p. 35.
- Bukovsky, Vladimir [Владимир Буковский] (1981). Письма русского путешественника [Letters of a Russian traveler] (in Russian). New York: Chalidze publications. p. 32.
- Bukovsky, Vladimir; Gluzman, Semyon (1975a). A manual of psychiatry for political dissidents. London: Amnesty International. OCLC 872337790.
- Bukovskiĭ, Vladimir; Gluzman, Semyon (1975b). Håndbog i psykiatri for afvigere [A manual on psychiatry for dissidents] (in Danish). Göteborg: Samarbetsdynamik AB. ISBN 9185396001. OCLC 7551381.
- Bukovskij, Vladimir; Gluzman, Semen; Leva, Marco (1979). Guida psichiatrica per dissidenti. Con esempi pratici e una lettera dal Gulag [Psychiatric guide for dissidents. With practical examples and a letter from the Gulag] (in Italian). Milan: L'erba voglio. ASIN B00E3B4JK4.
- Calloway, Paul (1993). Russian/Soviet and Western psychiatry: a contemporary comparative study. Wiley. ISBN 0-471-59574-8.
- Chernosvitov, Evgeny [Евгений Черносвитов] (2002). Социальная медицина: Учебное пособие для вузов [Social medicine: a manual for higher schools] (in Russian). Moscow: Юнити-Дана [Unity-Dana]. ISBN 5238003447.
- De Boer, S.P.; Driessen, E.J.; Verhaar, H.L. (1982). Biographical dictionary of dissidents in the Soviet Union, 1956–1975. BRILL. ISBN 90-247-2538-0.
- Dmitrieva, Tatyana [Татьяна Дмитриева] (2001). Альянс права и милосердия: о проблеме защиты прав человека в психиатрии [The alliance of law and mercy: on the issue of human rights protection in psychiatry] (in Russian). Mоscow: Nauka. ISBN 5020226645.
- Fedor, Julie (2011). Russia and the Cult of State Security: The Chekist Tradition, From Lenin to Putin. Routledge. ISBN 978-1136671869.
- Fernando, Suman (2003). Cultural diversity, mental health and psychiatry: The struggle against racism. Psychology Press. ISBN 1583912533.
- Finckenauer, James (1995). Russian youth: law, deviance, and the pursuit of freedom. Transaction Publishers. ISBN 1-56000-206-9.
- Ghodse, Hamid (2011). International Perspectives on Mental Health. RC Psych Publications. p. 422. ISBN 978-1908020000.
- Gosden, Richard (2001). Punishing the Patient: How Psychiatrists Misunderstand and Mistreat Schizophrenia. Melbourne: Scribe Publications. ISBN 0-908011-52-0.
- Grigorenko, Elena; Ruzgis, Patricia; Sternberg, Robert (1997). Psychology of Russia: past, present, future. Nova Publishers. ISBN 1-56072-389-0.
- Helmchen, Hanfried; Sartorius, Norman (2010). Ethics in Psychiatry: European Contributions. Springer. ISBN 978-90-481-8720-1.
- Hunt, Kathleen (1998). Abandoned to the state: cruelty and neglect in Russian orphanages. Human Rights Watch. ISBN 1-56432-191-6.
- Johnston, Michael (2005). Civil society and corruption: mobilizing for reform. University Press of America. ISBN 0-7618-3125-8.
- Kadarkay, Árpád (1982). Human rights in American and Russian political thought. University Press of America. ISBN 978-0-8191-2481-4.
- Knapp, Martin (2007). Mental health policy and practice across Europe: the future direction of mental health care. McGraw-Hill International. ISBN 978-0-335-21467-9.
- Kondratev, Fedor [Фёдор Кондратьев] (2010). Судьбы больных шизофренией: клинико-социальный и судебно-психиатрический аспекты [The fates of the ill with schizophrenia: clinico-social and forensico-psychiatric aspects] (PDF) (in Russian). Moscow: ЗАО Юстицинформ [Closed joint-stock company Justitsinform]. Archived (PDF) from the original on 1 February 2014. The ISBN printed in the document (978-5-9977-0014-9) is invalid, causing a checksum error.
- Korolenko, Caesar; Dmitrieva, Nina [Цезарь Короленко, Нина Дмитриева] (2000). Социодинамическая психиатрия [Sociodynamic Psychiatry] (in Russian). Moscow: Академический проект [Academic Project]. ISBN 5829100150.
- Korotenko, Ada; Alikina, Natalia [Ада Коротенко, Наталия Аликина] (2002). Советская психиатрия: Заблуждения и умысел [Soviet psychiatry: fallacies and wilfulness] (in Russian). Kiev: Издательство «Сфера» [Publishing house "Sphere"]. ISBN 966-7841-36-7.
- Kutchins, Herb; Kirk, Stuart (1997). Making us crazy. DSM: the psychiatric bible and the creation of mental disorders. Free Press. ISBN 0-684-82280-6.
- Laird, Robbin; Hoffmann, Erik (1986). Soviet foreign policy in a changing world. Transaction Publishers. ISBN 0-202-24166-1.
- Laqueur, Walter (1980). The Political Psychology of Appeasement: Finlandization and Other Unpopular Essays. Transaction Publishers. ISBN 1412838320.
- Lisle, Angela (2010). Reflexive Practice. Xlibris Corporation. ISBN 978-1-4500-9197-8.
- Matvejević, Predrag (2004). Between exile and asylum: an eastern epistolary. Central European University Press. ISBN 963-9241-85-7.
- Metzl, Jonathan (2010). The Protest Psychosis: How Schizophrenia Became a Black Disease. Beacon Press. ISBN 978-0-8070-8592-9.
- Munro, Robin (2002). Dangerous minds: political psychiatry in China today and its origins in the Mao era. Human Rights Watch. ISBN 1-56432-278-5.
- Pietikäinen, Petteri (2015). Madness: A History. Routledge. ISBN 978-1317484448.
- Podrabinek, Alexandr (1980). Punitive medicine. Karoma Publishers. ISBN 0-89720-022-5.
- Pospielovsky, Dimitry (1988). Soviet Anti-Religious Campaigns and Persecutions: Vol. 2 of A History of Soviet Atheism in Theory and Practice, and the Believer. New York: St Martin's Press. ISBN 0312009054.
- Pukhovsky, Nikolai [Николай Пуховский] (2001). Очерки общей психопатологии шизофрении [Essays on the general psychopathology of schizophrenia] (in Russian). Moscow: Академический проект [Academic Project]. ISBN 5-8291-0154-8.
- Rejali, Darius (2009). Torture and Democracy. Princeton: Princeton University Press. ISBN 978-0-691-14333-0.
- Sabshin, Melvin (2008). Changing American psychiatry: a personal perspective. American Psychiatric Pub. ISBN 978-1-58562-307-5.
- Schroeter, Leonard (1979). The last exodus. University of Washington Press. ISBN 0-295-95685-2.
- Shlapentokh, Vladimir (1990). Soviet intellectuals and political power: the post-Stalin era. I.B.Tauris. ISBN 1-85043-284-8.
- Szasz, Thomas (1984). The therapeutic state: Psychiatry in the mirror of current events. Prometheus Books. ISBN 0-87975-239-4.
- Spector, Malcolm; Kitsuse, John (2001). Constructing social problems. Transaction Publishers. ISBN 0-7658-0716-5.
- Voren, Robert van (2013a). Psychiatry as a tool of coercion in post-Soviet countries (PDF). The European Parliament. doi:10.2861/28281. ISBN 978-92-823-4595-5. Russian text: Voren, Robert van [Роберт ван Ворен] (2013). "Психиатрия как средство репрессий в советских и постсоветских странах" [Psychiatry as a tool of coercion in post-Soviet countries]. Вестник Ассоциации психиатров Украины [The Herald of the Ukrainian Psychiatric Association] (in Russian) (5). The Ukrainian Psychiatric Association.
- Voren, Robert van (2010b). Cold war in psychiatry: human factors, secret actors. Amsterdam & New York: Rodopi Publishers. ISBN 978-90-420-3048-0.
- Voren, Robert van (2009). On dissidents and madness: From the Soviet Union of Leonid Brezhnev to the "Soviet Union" of Vladimir Putin. Amsterdam & New York: Rodopi Publishers. ISBN 978-90-420-2585-1.
- Voren, Robert van; Bloch, Sidney (1989). Soviet psychiatric abuse in the Gorbachev era. International Association on the Political Use of Psychiatry. ISBN 90-72657-01-2.
- Vasilenko, N.Y. [Н.Ю. Василенко] (2004). Основы социальной медицины [Fundamentals of social medicine] (in Russian). Vladivostok: Издательство Дальневосточного университета [Publishing house of Far Eastern Federal University].
- Vitaliev, Vitali (1991). Dateline freedom. Hutchinson. ISBN 0-09-174677-9.
- West, Donald; Green, Richard (1997). Sociolegal control of homosexuality: a multi-nation comparison. Springer. ISBN 0-306-45532-3.

=== Journal articles and book chapters ===
- "15 лет Независимому психиатрическому журналу" [15th anniversary of the Independent Psychiatric Journal]. Nezavisimiy Psikhiatricheskiy Zhurnal [The Independent Psychiatric Journal] (in Russian) (4). 2005. ISSN 1028-8554.
- "17 лет неисполнения закона — цена доверия к власти и киргизский опыт" [17 years of failure of the law — the price of trust in the government and the Kyrgyz experience]. Nezavisimiy Psikhiatricheskiy Zhurnal [The Independent Psychiatric Journal] (1): 85–86. 2009. ISSN 1028-8554.
- A Chronicle of Human Rights in the USSR. Khronika Press. 1982. p. 62.
- "A new campaign against the political mind-benders". New Scientist. 71 (1007): 4. 1 July 1976.
- "Abuse of Psychiatry". British Medical Journal. 3 (5879): 509–510. 8 September 1973. doi:10.1136/bmj.3.5879.509. PMC 1586989. PMID 4741600.
- "Autumn Quarterly Meeting 1978". The Psychiatrist. 3 (1): 5–7. January 1979. doi:10.1192/pb.3.1.5.
- "Declaration of Hawaii: Declaration adopted unanimously by the General Assembly of the World Psychiatric Association at the Sixth World Congress of Psychiatry, 1977". British Medical Journal. 2 (6096): 1204–1205. 5 November 1977. doi:10.1136/bmj.2.6096.1204. PMC 1632165. PMID 589089.
- "Declaration of Hawaii". Journal of Medical Ethics. 4 (2): 71–73. June 1978a. doi:10.1136/jme.4.2.71. PMC 1154636. PMID 671474.
- "Dr Alexander Voloshanovich: A Critic of the Political Misuse of Psychiatry in the USSR". The Psychiatrist. 4 (5): 70–71. May 1980. doi:10.1192/pb.4.5.70.
- "News Items: Dr Semyon Gluzman". The Psychiatrist. 5 (2): 36. February 1981. doi:10.1192/pb.5.2.36.
- "Psychiatric Official Denies Forcible Commitment of Dissidents". The Current Digest of the Soviet Press. 25 (32). American Association for the Advancement of Slavic Studies. 1973.
- "Цитатник номера" [Quote set of the issue]. Вестник Ассоциации психиатров Украины [The Herald of the Ukrainian Psychiatric Association] (in Russian) (5). The Ukrainian Psychiatric Association. 2013.
- "Soviets finally condemned for psychiatric malpractices… will South Africa be next?". New Scientist. 75 (1068): 571. 8 September 1977. PMID 11663782.
- "Soviets Left WPA Under Expulsion Threat". Psychiatric News. 45 (22): 11. 19 November 2010. doi:10.1176/pn.45.22.psychnews_45_22_024.
- "Soviet psychiatry". The Yale Journal of International Law. 11 (1): 354. Fall 1985.
- "Swiss and American Psychiatric Associations vote to suspend USSR". Human Rights Internet Reporter. 8: 381. 1982. ISSN 0275-049X.
- "Выступления П.Д. Тищенко, Б.Г. Юдина, А.И. Антонова, А.Г. Гофмана, В.Н. Краснова, Б.А. Воскресенского" [Speeches by P.D. Tishchenko, B.G. Yudin, A.I. Antonov, A.G. Gofman, V.N. Krasnov, B.A. Voskresensky]. Nezavisimiy Psikhiatricheskiy Zhurnal [The Independent Psychiatric Journal] (in Russian) (2). 2004. ISSN 1028-8554.
- "Независимая психиатрическая ассоциация России" [The Independent Psychiatric Association of Russia]. Неприкосновенный запас [Emergency Ration] (in Russian). 5 (19). 2001. Archived from the original on 21 March 2012.
- "The spread of Soviet suppression". New Scientist. 78 (1104): 493. 25 May 1978.
- "World Psychiatric Association: The Declaration of Hawaii". The Psychiatrist. 2 (1): 12–13. January 1978b. doi:10.1192/pb.2.1.12.
- Abouelleil, Mohammed; Bingham, Rachel (September 2014). "Can psychiatry distinguish social deviance from mental disorder?". Philosophy, Psychiatry, & Psychology. 21 (3): 243–255. doi:10.1353/ppp.2014.0043.
- Adler, Nancy; Gluzman, Semyon (December 1993). "Soviet special psychiatric hospitals. Where the system was criminal and the inmates were sane". The British Journal of Psychiatry. 163 (6): 713–720. doi:10.1192/bjp.163.6.713. PMID 8306112.
- Alexander, George (1997). "International Human Rights Protection Against Psychiatric Political Abuses". Santa Clara Law Review. 37 (2): 387–426. Archived from the original on 2 February 2014.
- Alexéyeff, Sergei (31 January 1976). "Abuse of psychiatry as a tool for political repression in the Soviet Union". The Medical Journal of Australia. 1 (5): 122–123. doi:10.5694/j.1326-5377.1976.tb109281.x. PMID 1263959.
- Appleby, Louis (7 November 1987). "Anatoly Koryagin: what next on Soviet psychiatric abuse?". British Medical Journal. 295 (6607): 1164. doi:10.1136/bmj.295.6607.1164. PMC 1248242. PMID 3120927.
- Bebtschuk, Marina; Smirnova, Daria; Khayretdinov, Oleg (April 2012). "Family and family therapy in Russia". International Review of Psychiatry. 24 (2): 121–127. doi:10.3109/09540261.2012.656305. PMID 22515460.
- Bernstein, Norman (21 November 1980). "Punitive Medicine". The Journal of the American Medical Association. 244 (20): 2354. doi:10.1001/jama.1980.03310200078038.
- Bloch, Sidney (June 1980). "The political misuse of Soviet psychiatry: Honolulu and beyond" (PDF). Australian and New Zealand Journal of Psychiatry. 14 (2): 109–114. doi:10.3109/00048678009159364. PMID 6107077.
- Bloch, Sidney (March 1990). "Athens and beyond: Soviet psychiatric abuse and the World Psychiatric Association". The Psychiatrist. 14 (3): 129–133. doi:10.1192/pb.14.3.129.
- Bukovsky, Vladimir (1971). "Bukovsky appeals to Western psychiatrists". Intercontinental Press. 9: 392.
- Bukovsky, Vladimir; Gluzman, Semyon [Владимир Буковский, Семён Глузман] (January–February 1975c). "Пособие по психиатрии для инакомыслящих" [A manual on psychiatry for dissidents] (PDF). Хроника защиты прав в СССР [Chronicle of defense of rights in the USSR] (in Russian) (13): 36–61.
- Bukovsky, Vladimir; Gluzman, Semyon (Winter–Spring 1975d). "A manual on psychiatry for dissidents". Survey: A Journal of East and West Studies. 21 (1): 180–199.
- Bukovsky, Vladimir; Gluzman, Semyon (1975e). "A dissident's guide to psychiatry". A Chronicle of Human Rights in the USSR (13). New York: Kronika Press: 31–57.
- Boukovsky, Vladimir; Glouzmann, Semion (September 1975). "Guide de psychiatrie pour les dissidents soviétiques: dédié à Lonia Pliouchtch, victime de la terreur psychiatrique" [Guide on psychiatry for Soviet dissidents: dedicated to Lyonya Plyushch, a victim of psychiatric terror]. Esprit (in French). 449 (9): 307–332. JSTOR 24263203.
- Bukowski, Wladimir; Gluzman, Semen (1976). "Psychiatrie-handbuch für dissidenten" [A manual on psychiatry for dissidents]. Samisdat. Stimmen aus dem "anderen Rußland" (in German) (8). Bern: 29–48.
- Bukovsky, Vladimir; Reddaway, Peter (9 March 1972). "A Letter from Vladimir Bukovsky". The New York Review of Books.
- Chodoff, Paul (September 1985). "Ethical conflicts in psychiatry: the Soviet Union vs. the U.S.". Hospital and Community Psychiatry. 36 (9): 925–928. doi:10.1176/ps.36.9.925. PMID 4065851.
- Faraone, Stephen (October 1982). "Psychiatry and political repression in the Soviet Union". American Psychologist. 37 (10): 1105–1112. doi:10.1037/0003-066x.37.10.1105. PMID 7149424.
- Freedman, Alfred; Halpern, Abraham (21 December 1989). "Soviet Psychiatry: An Exchange". The New York Review of Books.
- Gershman, Carl (1984). "Psychiatric abuse in the Soviet Union". Society. 21 (5): 54–59. doi:10.1007/BF02695434. PMID 11615169.
- Gluzman, Semyon [Семён Глузман] (2011). "Это было в Афинах…" [It was in Athens…]. Новости медицины и фармации [Medicine and Pharmacy News] (in Russian) (383). Издательский дом «Заславский» ["Zaslavsky" Publishing House].
- Gluzman, Semyon [Семён Глузман] (2012). "Как я писал закон для СССР" [How I wrote the Law for the USSR]. Вестник Ассоциации психиатров Украины [The Herald of the Ukrainian Psychiatric Association] (in Russian) (1). The Ukrainian Psychiatric Association.
- Gluzman, Semyon [Семён Глузман] (2013). "История психиатрических репрессий" [The history of psychiatric repression]. Вестник Ассоциации психиатров Украины [The Herald of the Ukrainian Psychiatric Association] (in Russian) (2). The Ukrainian Psychiatric Association.
- Gluzman, Semyon [Семён Глузман] (2009a). "Украинское лицо судебной психиатрии" [The Ukrainian face of forensic psychiatry]. Новости медицины и фармации [Medicine and Pharmacy News] (in Russian). 15 (289). Издательский дом «Заславский» ["Zaslavsky" Publishing House].
- Gluzman, Semyon [Семён Глузман] (2009b). "Этиология психиатрических злоупотреблений: попытка мультидисциплинарного анализа" [The etiology of psychiatric abuses: an attempt at multidisciplinary analysis]. Новости медицины и фармации [Medicine and Pharmacy News] (in Russian). 20 (300): 18–19.
- Gluzman, Semyon [Семён Глузман] (January 2010a). "Этиология злоупотреблений в психиатрии: попытка мультидисциплинарного анализа" [The etiology of abuses in psychiatry: an attempt at multidisciplinary analysis]. Нейроnews: Психоневрология и нейропсихиатрия [Neuronews: Psychoneurology and Neuropsychiatry] (in Russian). 1 (20). Archived from the original on 17 November 2015.
- Gluzman, Semyon [Семён Глузман] (2010b). "Расширенная судебно-психиатрическая заочная экспертиза по делу Григоренко Петра Григорьевича, 1907 г.р., украинца, жителя г. Москвы (восстановлено на основании копии Самиздата)" [A comprehensive in absentia psychiatric opinion on the case of Grigorenko Pyotr Grigoryevich, b. 1907, a Ukrainian, Moscow resident (restored on the basis of a Samizdat copy)]. Новости медицины и фармации [Medicine and Pharmacy News] (in Russian). No. 329.
- Gosden, Richard (February 1997). "Shrinking the Freedom of Thought: How Involuntary Psychiatric Treatment Violates Basic Human Rights". Monitors: Journal of Human Rights and Technology. 1 (1).
- Gushansky, Emmanuil [Эммауил Гушанский] (2005). "Предисловие к книге Анатолия Прокопенко «Безумная психиатрия»" [Preface to the book by Anatoly Prokopenko Mad Psychiatry]. In Taras, Anatoly [Анатолий Tapac] (ed.). Карательная психиатрия [Punitive psychiatry] (in Russian). Moscow & Minsk: АСТ, Харвест [AST, Harvest]. p. 35. ISBN 5170301723.
- Healey, Dan (June 2011). "Book Review: Robert van Voren, Cold War in Psychiatry". History of Psychiatry. 22 (2): 246–247. doi:10.1177/0957154X110220020802.
- Helmchen, Hanfried (December 1978). "Declaration of Hawaii". Journal of Medical Ethics. 4 (4): 217–218. doi:10.1136/jme.4.4.217-b. PMC 1154691. PMID 33270.
- Horvath, Robert (February 2014). "Breaking the Totalitarian Ice: The Initiative Group for the Defense of Human Rights in the USSR". Human Rights Quarterly. 36 (1): 147–175. doi:10.1353/hrq.2014.0013.
- Joffe, Olimpiad (July 1984). "Perspectives on Soviet Law for the 1980s". American Journal of International Law. 78 (3): 728–732.
- Kastrup, Marianne (June 2002). "The work of the WPA Committee to Review the Abuse of Psychiatry". World Psychiatry. 1 (2): 126–127. PMC 1489863. PMID 16946875.
- Kelly, Brendan (January 2015). "Human rights in psychiatric practice: an overview for clinicians". Advances in Psychiatric Treatment. 21 (1): 54–62. doi:10.1192/apt.bp.114.013409.
- Keukens, Rob; Voren, Robert van (2007). "Coercion in psychiatry: still an instrument of political misuse?". BMC Psychiatry. 7 (Suppl 1): S4. doi:10.1186/1471-244X-7-S1-S4. PMC 3332857.
- Khvorostianov, Natalia; Elias, Nelly (2015). "'Leave us alone!': Representation of social work in the Russian immigrant media in Israel". International Social Work. 60 (2): 409–422. doi:10.1177/0020872815574131.
- Koryagin, Anatoly (30 June 1988). "World psychiatry: readmitting the Soviet Union". The Lancet. 2 (8605): 268–269. doi:10.1016/S0140-6736(88)92549-4. PMID 11644351.
- Koryagin, Anatoly (March 1989). "The involvement of Soviet psychiatry in the persecution of dissenters". The British Journal of Psychiatry. 154 (3): 336–340. doi:10.1192/bjp.154.3.336. PMID 2597834.
- Kovalyov, Andrei [Андрей Ковалёв] (2007). "Взгляд очевидца на предысторию принятия закона о психиатрической помощи" [View of the eyewitness to the backstory of the adoption of the Mental Health Law]. Nezavisimiy Psikhiatricheskiy Zhurnal [The Independent Psychiatric Journal] (in Russian) (3): 82–90.
- Leontev, Dmitry [Дмитрий Леонтьев] (16 April 2010). "Расширить границы нормального" [Broadening the boundaries of normality]. Psychologies (in Russian) (47).
- Levine, Sidney (May 1981). "The Special Committee on the Political Abuse of Psychiatry". The Psychiatrist. 5 (5): 94–95. doi:10.1192/pb.5.5.94.
- Luty, Jason (January 2014). "Psychiatry and the dark side: eugenics, Nazi and Soviet psychiatry". Advances in Psychiatric Treatment. 20 (1): 52–60. doi:10.1192/apt.bp.112.010330.
- Magalif, Alexandr [Александр Магалиф] (2010). "Коготок увяз — всей птичке пропасть" [Chickens come home to roost]. Nezavisimiy Psikhiatricheskiy Zhurnal [The Independent Psychiatric Journal] (in Russian) (1): 69–71. ISSN 1028-8554.
- Merskey, Harold (June 1978). "Political neutrality and international cooperation in medicine". Journal of Medical Ethics. 4 (2): 74–77. doi:10.1136/jme.4.2.74. PMC 1154638. PMID 671475.
- Moran, Mark (19 November 2010). "Former Soviet Dissidents Believed APA Pressure Forced Change". Psychiatric News. 45 (22): 11–26. doi:10.1176/pn.45.22.psychnews_45_22_023.
- Munro, Robin (2000). "The Soviet Case: Prelude to a Global Consensus on Psychiatry and Human Rights". Columbia Journal of Asian Law. 14 (1).
- Murray, Thomas (June 1983). "Genetic screening in the workplace: ethical issues". Journal of Occupational and Environmental Medicine. 25 (6): 451–454. doi:10.1097/00043764-198306000-00009. PMID 6886846.
- Ougrin, Dennis; Gluzman, Semyon; Dratcu, Luiz (November 2006). "Psychiatry in post-communist Ukraine: dismantling the past, paving the way for the future". The Psychiatrist. 30 (12): 456–459. doi:10.1192/pb.30.12.456.
- Perlin, Michael (2006). "International Human Rights and Comparative Mental Health Law: The Role of Institutional Psychiatry and the Suppression of Political Dissent". Israel Law Review. 39: 71–97. doi:10.1017/S0021223700013145. SSRN 982217.
- Reddaway, Peter (1971a). "Plea to West on Soviet 'mad-house' jails". Mental Health. 30 (Summer): 28. PMC 5085582. PMID 28908747.
- Reddaway, Peter (12 October 1978). "KGB Psychiatry". The New York Review of Books. 25 (15): 70–71. PMID 11662655.
- Richter, Derek (August 1971). "Political Dissenters in Mental Hospitals". The British Journal of Psychiatry. 119 (549): 225–226. doi:10.1192/bjp.119.549.225.
- Roth, Martin (September 1992). "Kenneth Rawnsley: Obituary". The Psychiatrist. 16 (9): 587–589. doi:10.1192/pb.16.9.587.
- Savenko, Yuri [Юрий Савенко] (2005a). "Карательная психиатрия в России (рецензия)" [Punitive psychiatry in Russia (review)]. Nezavisimiy Psikhiatricheskiy Zhurnal [The Independent Psychiatric Journal] (in Russian) (1). ISSN 1028-8554.
- Savenko, Yuri [Юрий Савенко] (2005b). ""Институт дураков" Виктора Некипелова" [Institute of fools by Viktor Nekipelov]. Nezavisimiy Psikhiatricheskiy Zhurnal [The Independent Psychiatric Journal] (in Russian) (4). ISSN 1028-8554.
- Savenko, Yuri [Юрий Савенко] (2007a). "15-летие Закона о психиатрической помощи" [15th anniversary of the Law on Mental Health Care]. Nezavisimiy Psikhiatricheskiy Zhurnal [The Independent Psychiatric Journal] (in Russian) (3): 9–10. ISSN 1028-8554.
- Savenko, Yuri [Юрий Савенко] (2007b). "Дело Ларисы Арап или как можно поместить любого в психиатрическую лечебницу" [The case of Larisa Arap, or how one can place any person in a psychiatric hospital]. Nezavisimiy Psikhiatricheskiy Zhurnal [The Independent Psychiatric Journal] (in Russian) (3): 75–77. ISSN 1028-8554.
- Savenko, Yuri [Юрий Савенко] (2010). "Латентные формы антипсихиатрии как главная опасность" [Latent forms of anti-psychiatry as a major threat]. Nezavisimiy Psikhiatricheskiy Zhurnal [The Independent Psychiatric Journal] (in Russian) (4): 13–17. ISSN 1028-8554.
- Scarnati, Rick (1980). "The prostitution of forensic psychiatry in the Soviet Union" (PDF). Bulletin of the American Academy of Psychiatry and the Law. 8 (1): 111–113. PMID 7225584.
- Schmidt, Victoria; Shchurko, Tatsiana (September 2014). "Children's rights in post-Soviet countries: The case of Russia and Belarus". International Social Work. 57 (5): 447–458. doi:10.1177/0020872814537852.
- Smythies, John (August 1973). "Psychiatry and the neurosciences". Psychological Medicine. 3 (3): 267–269. doi:10.1017/S0033291700049576. PMID 4125732.
- Szasz, Thomas (July–August 2004). "Pharmacracy in America". Society. 41 (5): 54–58. doi:10.1007/BF02688218.
- Szasz, Thomas (25 April 2006). "Secular humanism and "scientific psychiatry"". Philosophy, Ethics, and Humanities in Medicine. 1 (1): E5. doi:10.1186/1747-5341-1-5. PMC 1483825. PMID 16759353.
- Szasz, Thomas (2 January 1978). "Soviet psychiatry: its supporters in the West". Inquiry: 4–5.
- Voevoda, Vladimir; Chugunova, Nina; Krivtsov, Pavel [Владимир Воевода, Нина Чугунова, Павел Кривцов] (15–22 April 1989). "Не боюсь тебя, психиатр!" [I do not fear you, psychiatrist!]. Ogoniok [Little Flame] (in Russian) (16): 24–27.
- Voren, Robert van [Роберт ван Ворен] (2013b). "От политических злоупотреблений психиатрией к реформе психиатрической службы" [From political abuses of psychiatry to the reform of psychiatric service]. Вестник Ассоциации психиатров Украины [The Herald of the Ukrainian Psychiatric Association] (in Russian) (2). The Ukrainian Psychiatric Association.
- Voren, Robert van (2002). "Comparing Soviet and Chinese Political Psychiatry" (PDF). The Journal of the American Academy of Psychiatry and the Law. 30 (1): 131–135. PMID 11931361. Archived from the original (PDF) on 26 July 2011.
- Voren, Robert van (January 2010a). "Political Abuse of Psychiatry—An Historical Overview". Schizophrenia Bulletin. 36 (1): 33–35. doi:10.1093/schbul/sbp119. PMC 2800147. PMID 19892821.
- Voren, Robert van (5 July 2015). "Памяти Леонида Плюща. Человек против карательной психиатрии СССР" [In commemoration of Leonid Plyushch. The man is against punitive psychiatry of the USSR]. Новое Время [New Time] (in Russian). Archived from the original on 22 July 2015.
- Vinogradova, Lyubov; Savenko, Yuri [Любовь Виноградова, Юрий Савенко] (2006). "Попытка выхолостить очередной демократический закон" [An attempt to emasculate another democratic law]. Альманах «Неволя» ["Bondage" Almanac] (in Russian) (6).
- Weich, Scott (June 1991). "Soviet psychiatry". The Psychiatrist. 15 (6): 369–370. doi:10.1192/pb.15.6.369-a.
- Wynn, Allan (22 January 1983). "Imprisonment of Dr Anatoly Koryagin". BMJ. 286 (6361): 309. doi:10.1136/bmj.286.6361.309-a. PMC 1546518. PMID 6402080.
- Zharikov, N.M.; Kiselev, A.S. [Н.М. Жариков, А.С. Киселёв] (1990). "Психиатрическая помощь в СССР и некоторые её показатели" [Mental health care in the Soviety Union and some of its indicators]. Журнал невропатологии и психиатрии им. С.С. Корсакова [The Korsakov Journal of Neuropathology and Psychiatry] (in Russian) (90): 70–74.
- Zile, Zigurds (March–April 1985). "Embarrassing in form, promising in substance. Soviet law in theory and practice". Wisconsin Law Review: 349.

=== Newspapers ===
- Burns, John (26 July 1981). "Moscow silencing psychiatry critics". The New York Times.
- Murphy, Kim (30 May 2006). "Speak Out? Are You Crazy?". Los Angeles Times.
- Reddaway, Peter (12 March 1971b). "Plea to West on Soviet 'mad-house' jails". The Times. p. 8.
- Reich, Walter (30 January 1983). "The world of Soviet psychiatry". The New York Times. Russian text: Reich, Walter [Уолтер Рейч] (15 May 2008). "Мир советской психиатрии" [The world of Soviet psychiatry]. The New York Times (in Russian). Archived from the original on 19 January 2012.
- Trehub, Hanna (22 February 2013). "Political Madness: Dutch Sovietologist Robert van Voren speaks about Soviet repressive psychiatry and its surviving offshoots". The Ukrainian Week.

=== Audio-visual material ===
- "Psychiatric Practices in the Soviet Union. Guests were members of the delegation which visited Soviet psychiatric facilities and patients in February of 1989" (TV interview). C-SPAN, USA. p. duration 01.01.05.
- Boltyanskaya, Natella [Нателла Болтянская] (25 April 2014). "Параллели, события, люди: Карательная психиатрия" [Parallels, Events, People: Punitive Psychiatry] (in Russian). Voice of America. duration 00.15.21 (part 1).

=== Websites ===
- Fedenko, Pavel [Павел Феденко] (9 October 2009). "Был бы человек, а диагноз найдется" [A diagnosis is quickly found to attribute a person with]. The BBC Russian Service.
- "glasnost, n." Merriam-Webster.
- Kekelidze, Zurab [Зураб Кекелидзе] (22 October 2013). "Кому выгоден миф о карательной психиатрии? (Пресс-конференция проф. З.И. Кекелидзе в связи с направлением на принудительное лечение оппозиционера Михаила Косенко)" [For whom is the myth of punitive psychiatry profitable? (Press conference of prof. Z.I. Kekelidze in connection with sending oppositionist Mikhail Kosenko to compulsory treatment)] (in Russian). Independent Psychiatric Association of Russia.
