= Koryagin =

Koryagin (Russian: Корягин) is a Russian masculine surname. It originates from the verb koryachitsya, which means either being stubborn or to place legs widely while walking. The feminine counterpart is Koryagina. The surname may refer to the following notable people:

- Anatoly Koryagin (born 1938), Soviet psychiatrist and dissident
- Gleb Koryagin (born 1994), Russian ice hockey player
