= James Birley =

James Birley may refer to:

- James Leatham Tennant Birley (1928–2013), British psychiatrist
- James Leatham Birley (1884–1934), his father, British physician and neurologist
