= Anatoly Koryagin =

Soviet psychiatrist and dissident (born 1938)

Anatoly Ivanovich Koryagin
- Анатолий Иванович Корягин
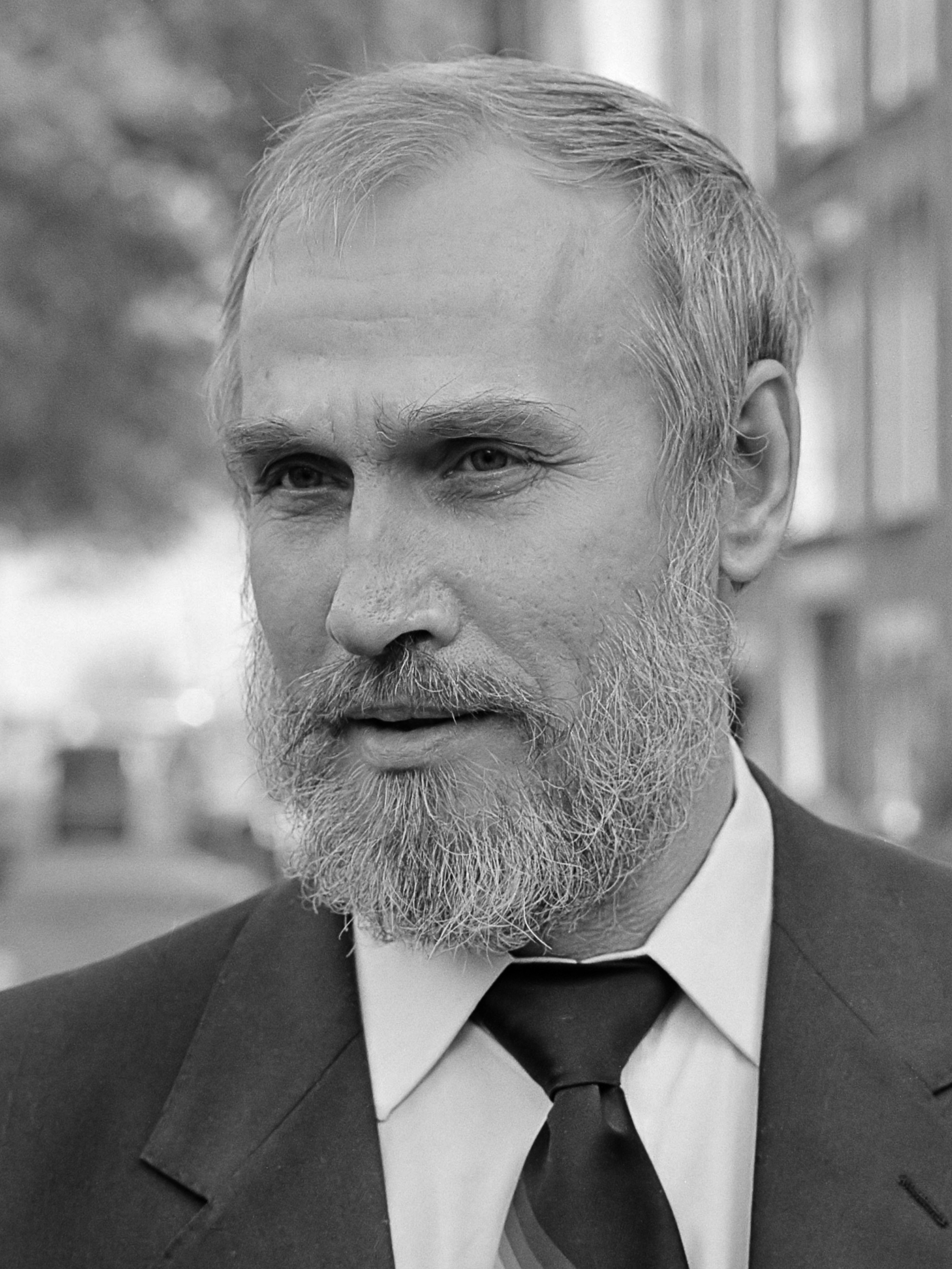
- Koryagin at the Sakharov Congress in Amsterdam on 22 May 1987
- Born: 15 September 1938 (age 87); Kansk, Krasnoyarsk Krai, Soviet Union
- Citizenship: Soviet Union (1938–1991)→Russia (1991–present)
- Education: the Krasnoyarsk Medical Institute
- Occupations: psychiatrist, human rights activist
- Known for: his participation in the Working Commission to Investigate the Use of Psychiatry for Political Purposes and struggle against political abuse of psychiatry in the Soviet Union
- Awards: honorary membership of the World Psychiatric Association and the American Psychiatric Association, fellowship of the Royal College of Psychiatrists, the Scientific Freedom and Responsibility Award of the American Association for the Advancement of Science
- Scientific career
- Workplaces: the Kyzyl regional psychiatric hospital, the Kharkiv regional psychiatric hospital, the Working Commission to Investigate the Use of Psychiatry for Political Purposes

Anatoly Ivanovich Koryagin (Russian: Анато́лий Ива́нович Коря́гин, born 15 September 1938, Kansk, Krasnoyarsk Krai) is a psychiatrist and Soviet dissident. He holds a Candidate of Science degree (equivalent to PhD in the West). Along with others, he exposed political abuse of psychiatry in the Soviet Union. He pointed out Russia constructed psychiatric prisons to punish dissidents.

== Early career ==
Koryagin was born on 15 September 1938 in Kansk (Krasnoyarsk Krai, Russia). After graduating from the Krasnoyarsk Medical Institute in 1963, Koryagin worked for 4 years as a psychiatrist in Abakan. In 1972 he successfully defended his doctoral thesis on apathetic aspects of schizophrenia, and in the same year he became deputy head doctor of the regional psychiatric hospital in Kyzyl. In 1978 he became a consultant at the Kharkiv regional psychiatric clinic.

== Struggle against political abuse of psychiatry and trial ==
Koryagin served as chief psychiatrist to the underground Commission to Investigate the Use of Psychiatry for Political Purposes, which was formed in 1977. He and another psychiatrist examined 55 dissidents who had been released or were going to be involuntarily confined. They concluded that there was no medical justification for the confinement of these people, and then campaigned for the release of dissidents held in psychiatric facilities.

Koryagin was arrested in February 1981. In June that year he was sentenced to 7 years of hard labor, to be followed by 5 years of internal exile. The charge was anti-Soviet activities for having corresponded with the British medical journal The Lancet, which published an article by Koryagin critical of the Soviet government's use of involuntary psychiatric confinement for political reasons. Koryagin was stripped of Soviet citizenship after publishing his article in which he accused the Soviets of interning sane people to psychiatric hospitals. Koryagin documented the existence of 16 special hospitals for dissidents and 183 political prisoners that were confined in them. The transcripts of his trial, which were published by Amnesty International in 1982, record the following statement he made:

My investigation and trial do not constitute an act of justice, but a means of suppressing me for my views. I know that the sentence will be harsh. I do not ask anything of this court. Regardless of the sentence imposed on me, I state that I will never accept the situation which exists in our country, where mentally healthy people are imprisoned in psychiatric hospitals for trying to think independently. I know that long years of physical imprisonment, humiliation, and mockery await me. Fully aware of this, I embark on it in the hope that it will increase the chances for others to live in freedom.

On 5 April 1981, the Moscow Helsinki Group members Yelena Bonner, Sofiya Kalistratova, Ivan Kovalyov, Naum Meiman issued document No. 162 "The Arrest of Anatoly Koryagin" which stated,

The arrest of Koryagin puts a definite end to the humane and legal activity of the Working Commission to Investigate the Use of Psychiatry for Political Purposes, and gives rise to the fear that the authorities intend to increase their use of psychiatric persecution for political reasons.

== Detention, recognition and later life ==
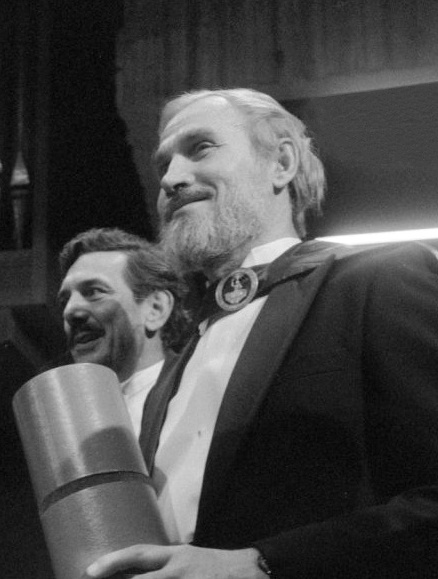
Koryagin is awarded an honorary doctorate on 20 October 1988

While held in the Chistopol prison, Koryagin often went on hunger strike, and as a result he was forcibly fed and also drugged with antipsychotic medications. He was beaten in a punishment cell. He made notes that contained the description of his imprisonment and were translated into English by Freedom House in New York City. According to Koryagin, Khasanov, head of the section where he was imprisoned, told him, "You'll die like a dog here." Koryagin managed to smuggle a letter to the West documenting his ordeal. The General Assembly of the World Psychiatric Association passed a resolution making Dr. Anatoly Koryagin an honorary individual member of the World Psychiatric Association for "demonstrating in the struggle against the perversion of psychiatry for nonmedical purposes, professional conscience, courage and devotion to duty, all in exceptional measure". The American Psychiatric Association elected him an honorary member while he was still imprisoned, and the Royal College of Psychiatry, which elected him a Fellow, addressed a letter to Yuri Andropov requesting his release. In 1983, the American Association for the Advancement of Science bestowed him with the Scientific Freedom and Responsibility Award.

Koryagin was eventually released on 19 February 1987 and emigrated to Switzerland on 24 April 1987. Although he had been offered asylum in Switzerland, he initially refused because one of his sons had just been arrested, but finally emigrated to Switzerland with his entire family later that year after his son's release.

During the Glasnost period, he remained a vocal critic of the Soviet psychiatric system, and a harsh critic of torture.

In 1987, Koryagin and his participation in struggle against political abuse of psychiatry in the Soviet Union became the subject of Robert van Voren's book Koryagin: A Man Struggling for Human Dignity.

In 1988, Koryagin sent the letter of appreciation for having been honoured with Fellowship in the Royal College of Psychiatrists to its President James Birley.

In 1990, Psychiatric Bulletin of the Royal College of Psychiatrists published the article Compulsion in psychiatry: blessing or curse? by Anatoly Koryagin. It contains eight arguments by which the existence of a system of political abuse of psychiatry in the U.S.S.R. can easily be demonstrated and analysis of the abuse of psychiatry.

In 1995 Koryagin returned to Russia and lived in Pereyaslavl-Zalessky. Now he lives in Switzerland.

== Some papers and interviews ==
- Koryagin, Anatoly (11 April 1981). "Unwilling patients". The Lancet. 317 (8224): 821–824. doi:10.1016/S0140-6736(81)92691-X. PMID 6111681. S2CID 29557161.
- Koryagin, Anatoly (30 July 1988). "World psychiatry: readmitting the Soviet Union". The Lancet. 332 (8605): 268–269. doi:10.1016/S0140-6736(88)92549-4. PMID 11644351. S2CID 12818215.
- Koryagin, Anatoly (9 September 1988). "Toward truly outlawing torture". Science. 241 (4871): 1277–1278. Bibcode:1988Sci...241.1277K. doi:10.1126/science.241.4871.1277.a. JSTOR 1702074. PMID 3137659.
- Koryagin, Anatoly (March 1989). "The involvement of Soviet psychiatry in the persecution of dissenters". The British Journal of Psychiatry. 154 (3): 336–340. doi:10.1192/bjp.154.3.336. PMID 2597834. S2CID 26148412.
- Koryagin, Anatoliy (1 July 1990). "Compulsion in psychiatry: blessing or curse?". Psychiatric Bulletin. 14 (7): 394–398. doi:10.1192/pb.14.7.394.
- Urban, George (1988). "Doctor for all seasons: a conversation with Dr Anatoly Koryagin soon after his release from detention; Bern, May 1987". Social and economic rights in the Soviet bloc: a documentary review seventy years after the Bolshevik Revolution. Transaction Publishers. pp. 43–46. ISBN 1412834198.

== Video ==
- Koryagin in video "Václav Havel and Soviet Dissidents", 8 min on YouTube
