= Working Commission to Investigate the Use of Psychiatry for Political Purposes =

Investigator of Soviet psychiatric terror

The Working Commission to Investigate the Use of Psychiatry for Political Purposes
- Рабочая комиссия по расследованию использования психиатрии в политических целях
- Formation: 5 January 1977
- Founder: Alexandr Podrabinek
- Dissolved: 21 July 1981; 45 years ago
- Type: Non-profit; NGO
- Headquarters: Moscow, Russia
- Fields: Psychiatry
- Leader: Alexandr Podrabinek
- Publication: Information Bulletin; A Chronicle of Current Events
- Parent organization: Moscow Helsinki Group

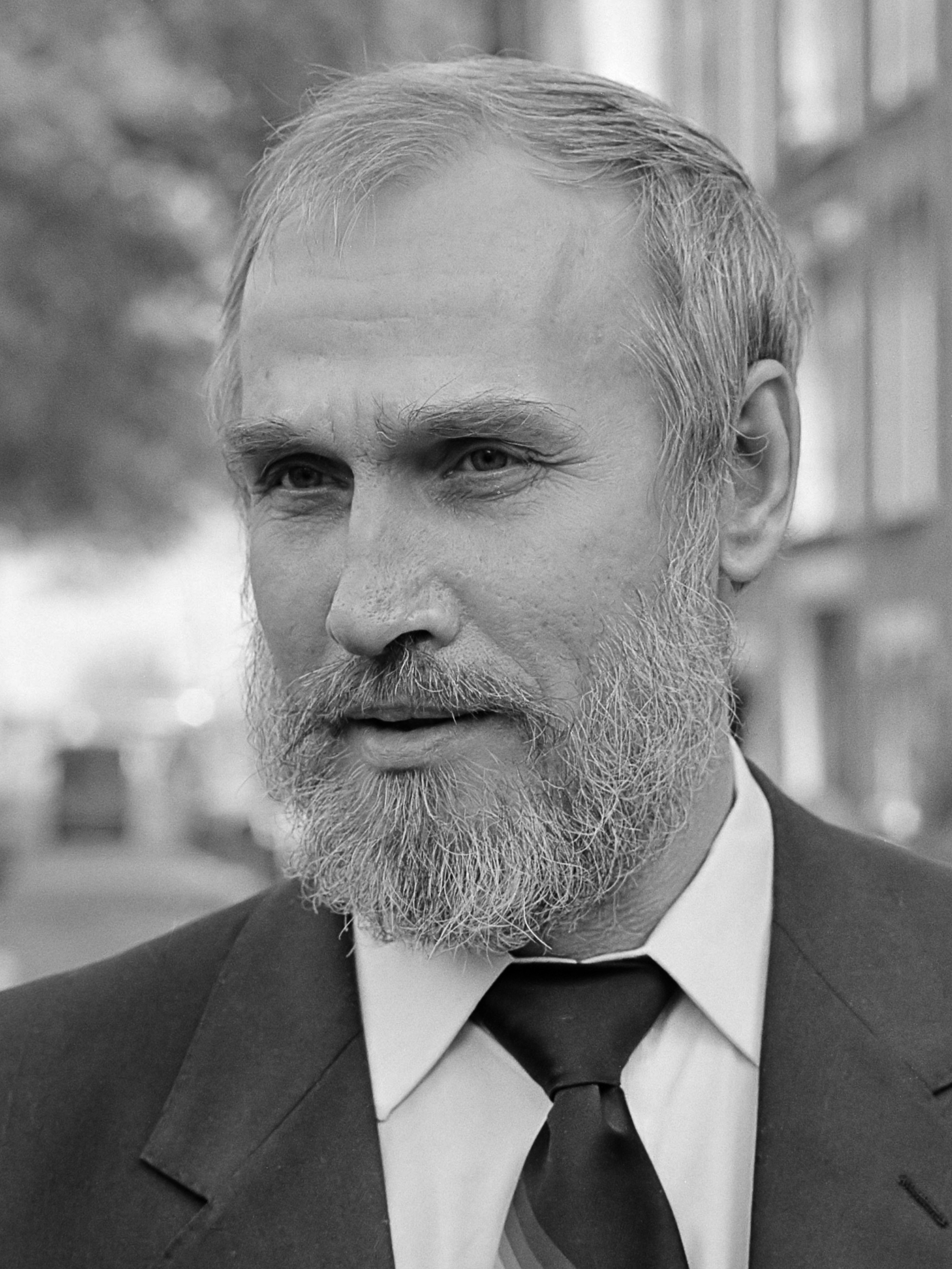
Anatoly Koryagin (b. 1938), a psychiatrist, expert of the Working Commission

The Working Commission to Investigate the Use of Psychiatry for Political Purposes (Russian: Рабо́чая коми́ссия по рассле́дованию испо́льзования психиатри́и в полити́ческих це́лях) was an offshoot of the Moscow Helsinki Group and a key source of information on psychiatric repression in the Soviet Union.

== Private staff ==
The commission was established on 5 January 1977 on the initiative of Alexandr Podrabinek along with a 47-year-old self-educated worker Feliks Serebrov, a 30-year-old computer programmer Vyacheslav Bakhmin and Irina Kuplun and was composed of five open members and several anonymous ones, including a few psychiatrists who, at great danger to themselves, conducted their own independent examinations of cases of alleged psychiatric abuse. The leader of the commission was Alexandr Podrabinek who published a book Punitive Medicine containing a ‘white list’ of two hundred of prisoners of conscience in Soviet mental hospitals and a ‘black list’ of over one hundred medical staff and doctors who took part in committing people to psychiatric facilities for political reasons. The psychiatric consultants to the Commission were Dr Alexander Voloshanovich and Dr Anatoly Koryagin.

== Investigating activities ==
The task stated by the Commission was not primarily to diagnose persons or to declare people who sought help mentally ill or mentally healthy. However, in some instances individuals who came for help to the Commission were examined by a psychiatrist who provided help to the Commission and made a precise diagnosis of their mental condition. At first it was psychiatrist Aleksandr Voloshanovich from the Moscow suburb of Dolgoprudny, who made these diagnoses. But when he had been compelled to emigrate on 7 February 1980, his work was continued by the Kharkov psychiatrist Anatoly Koryagin. Koryagin's contribution was to examine former and potential victims of political abuse of psychiatry by writing psychiatric diagnoses in which he deduced that the individual was not suffering from any mental disease. Those reports were employed as a means of defense: if the individual was picked up again and committed to mental hospital, the Commission had vindication that the hospitalization served non-medical purposes. Also some foreign psychiatrists including the Swedish psychiatrist Harald Blomberg and British psychiatrist Gery Low-Beer helped in examining former or potential victims of psychiatric abuse. The Commission used those reports in its work and publicly referred to them when it was essential.

The commission gathered as much information as possible of victims of psychiatric terror in the Soviet Union and published this information in their Information Bulletins. For the four years of its existence, the Commission published more than 1,500 pages of documentation including 22 Information Bulletins in which over 400 cases of the political abuse of psychiatry were documented in great detail. Summaries of the Information Bulletins were published in the key samizdat publication, A Chronicle of Current Events. The Information Bulletins were sent to the Soviet officials, with request to verify the data and notify the Commission if mistakes were found, and to the West, where human rights defenders used them in the course of their campaigns. The Information Bulletins were also used to provide the dissident movement with information about Western protests against the political abuse. The Working Commission also gathered information about relevant international events and published reports on the Honolulu Congress of the World Psychiatric Association, including the texts of the key resolutions, and printed translations of long letters by Professor Peter Berner about the course of establishing the Review Committee on abuse.

== Foreign reactions ==
Over fifty victims examined by psychiatrists of the Moscow Working Commission between 1977 and 1981 and the files smuggled to the West by Vladimir Bukovsky in 1971 were the material which convinced most psychiatric associations that there was distinctly something wrong in the USSR. Peter Reddaway said that after he had studied official documents in the Soviet archives, including minutes from meetings of the Politburo of the Central Committee of the Communist Party of the Soviet Union, it became evident to him that Soviet officials at high levels paid close attention to foreign responses to these cases, and if someone was discharged, all dissidents felt the pressure had played a significant part and the more foreign pressure the better. In the autumn of 1978, the British Royal College of Psychiatrists carried a resolution in which it reiterated its concern over the abuse of psychiatry for the suppression of dissent in the USSR and applauded the Soviet citizens who had taken an open stance against such abuse, by expressing its admiration and support especially for Semyon Gluzman, Alexander Podrabinek, Alexander Voloshanovich, and Vladimir Moskalkov.

== Forcing shutdown ==
Members of the Working Commission have been stifled through exile and imprisonment. All of its members were arrested or forced to emigrate. The Working Commission ceased to exist on 21 July 1981 when its last member Feliks Serebrov was sentenced to 5 years of camps and 5 years of exile. Prior to that, members of the Working Commission were arrested and sentenced to various terms of imprisonment and exile: Alexander Podrabinek was sentenced to 3 years of imprisonment (convicted for the second time), Vyacheslav Bakhmin was sentenced to 3 years of imprisonment, Leonard Ternovsky was sentenced to 3 years of imprisonment, Irina Grivnina was sentenced to 5 years of exile, and Anatoly Koryagin was sentenced to particularly severe punishment under Part 1 of Article of 70 the RSFSR Criminal Code, 7 years in prison camps and 5 years of subsequent exile. The charge was anti-Soviet activities for having corresponded with the British medical journal The Lancet, which published an article by Koryagin critical of the Soviet government's use of involuntary psychiatric confinement for political reasons. On 5 April 1981, the Moscow Helsinki Group members Yelena Bonner, Sofiya Kalistratova, Ivan Kovalyov, Naum Meiman issued document No. 162 "The Arrest of Anatoly Koryagin" which stated,

The arrest of Koryagin puts a definite end to the humane and legal activity of the Working Commission to Investigate the Use of Psychiatry for Political Purposes, and gives rise to the fear that the authorities intend to increase their use of psychiatric persecution for political reasons.
