= Gleb Koryagin =

Russian ice hockey player

- Born: August 6, 1994 (age 31) Moscow, Russia
- Height: 6 ft 0 in (183 cm)
- Weight: 198 lb (90 kg; 14 st 2 lb)
- Position: Defence
- KHL team Former teams: Free agent Dynamo Moscow; Lada Togliatti; Amur Khabarovsk; HC Sochi
- NHL draft: Undrafted
- Playing career: 2013–present

Gleb Koryagin (born August 6, 1994) is a Russian professional ice hockey player. He is currently an unrestricted free agent who most recently played for HC Sochi of the Kontinental Hockey League (KHL).

== Playing career ==
He first made his professional debut with Dynamo Moscow in the 2013–14 season. Koryagin returned to Dynamo for a second stint on July 19, 2017, after spending the duration of the 2016–17 season with HC Lada Togliatti.

Koryagin registered 4 assists in 46 regular season games with Dynamo in the 2017–18 season, before leaving as a free agent and signing a one-year deal with Amur Khabarovsk on September 1, 2018.
