= James Leatham Birley =

British physician and neurologist

- Born: 12 July 1884; Lingfield, Surrey
- Died: 6 March 1934 (aged 49); Ugley
- Education: Winchester College; University College, Oxford; St Thomas's Hospital Medical School
- Occupations: Physician and neurologist
- Known for: Work on fatigue and stress in WWI pilots
- Spouse(s): Margaret Edith Mercer, née Tennant (m. 1922)
- Children: 2 sons, 1 daughter, including James Leatham Tennant Birley

James Leatham Birley CBE FRCP (1884–1934) was a British physician and neurologist, known for his work on fatigue and stress in WWI pilots.

== Biography ==
After education at Winchester College, James Birley matriculated at University College, Oxford, where he graduated in 1908 with a first-class degree in natural science. He then studied medicine at St Thomas's Hospital Medical School. In 1911 he qualified from the University of Oxford BM Pathology and BM Forensic Medicine and Public Health. He graduated BM BCh (Oxon.)in 1912 and qualified MRCP in 1913. He held house appointments at St Thomas's Hospital and at the National Hospital for Diseases of the Nervous System, Queen Square. In 1915 he joined the Royal Army Medical Corps. During WWI he was stationed in France with the Royal Flying Corps from 1916 to 1919.

... from the first great battle of the Somme until the end of the fighting he was largely concerned with the development of the medical service of the Royal Air Force. His valuable work in that sphere was quickly recognized, and he rose to the position of its chief medical officer in France, with the rank of lieutenant-colonel, and, after his return to civil life, became its consulting physician, a post he retained until his death.

In 1920, he became a member of the War Office Committee of Enquiry into 'Shell-Shock', publishing their final report in 1920.

By 1921, Birley had graduated MD (Oxon.) and had published an article, co-authored by Leonard S. Dudgeon, in the journal Brain. At St Thomas's Hospital Birley was appointed assistant physician in 1919 and in 1928 full physician and director of the neurological department (as successor to Sir Farquhar Buzzard). Birley worked at St Thomas's Hospital until his death in 1934. He was simultaneously an assistant physician at the National Hospital, Queen Square for a few years.

On 11 August 1922, he married Margaret Edith Mercer, née Tennant. She was born in 1890 and was the widow, married in 1913, of Major Archibald Ariel Mercer (1884?–1914) and daughter of William Augustus Tennant of Ugley, Essex. There were two sons and a daughter from the marriage. The younger son was James Leatham Tennant Birley.

== Awards and honours ==
- 1919 — FRCP
- 1919 — CBE
- 1920 — Goulstonian Lecturer

== Selected publications ==
- Medical aspects of high flying. 1918.
- Temperament and service flying. 1918.
- Report on the medical aspects of high flying. 1920.
- Traumatic aneurysm of the intracranial portion of the internal carotid artery. 1928.
