= James Leatham Tennant Birley =

Psychiatrist

- Born: 31 May 1928; London, England, UK
- Died: 6 October 2013 (aged 85)
- Occupation: Psychiatrist

James Leatham Tennant Birley (31 May 1928 – 6 October 2013) of the Maudsley Hospital, London, was a psychiatrist and president of the Royal College of Psychiatrists from 1987 to 1990.

== Early life ==
After education at Winchester College, Birley studied medicine at University College, Oxford and St Thomas's Hospital Medical School, London. He qualified in 1952 BM BCh and then from 1952 to 1954 held junior appointments. From 1954 to 1956 he was a junior specialist in the RAMC. In 1957 he was a demonstrator in pathology at St Thomas's Hospital, where he worked under William Sargant. Birley was from 1958 to 1959 a medical registrar at North Middlesex Hospital and from 1959 to 1960 a psychiatry/neurology registrar at St Thomas's Hospital. At the Maudsley Hospital he joined the staff in 1960, and became a consultant in 1968, and retired in 1990. He qualified MRCP in 1958, graduated Doctor of Psychiatric Medicine in 1962, and qualified MRCPsych in 1971. In 1976 he was elected FRCP and FRCPsych.

In 1968 Birley and his colleague George Brown published a paper Crises and life changes and the onset of schizophrenia suggesting that "patients who were suffering from psychotic episodes were likely to have experienced some sort of recent life crisis." The paper was rejected by the British Journal of Psychiatry, but was published by the American Sociological Association's Journal of Health and Social Behavior and became a classic.

In the latter part of his career, Birley was involved with psychiatric reforms in the Soviet Union and the Eastern bloc. He represented the Royal College of Psychiatrists at the World Psychiatric Association meeting in 1989, when the Soviet Union was readmitted under strict conditions.

He was appointed CBE in the 1990 Birthday Honours. He was president of the British Medical Association from 1993 to 1994.

Upon his death in 2013 Birley was survived by his widow, four children, and ten grandchildren. His father was the neurologist James Leatham Birley (1884–1934).
