= British Journal of Psychiatry =

- Discipline: Psychiatry
- Language: English
- Edited by: Gin S. Malhi

Publication details
- Former names: The Asylum Journal, The Asylum Journal of Mental Science, Journal of Mental Science
- History: 1853–present
- Publisher: Royal College of Psychiatrists (United Kingdom)
- Frequency: Monthly
- Open access: After 12 months
- Impact factor: 8.5 (2025)

Standard abbreviations
- ISO 4: Br. J. Psychiatry

Indexing
- CODEN: BJPYAJ
- ISSN: 0007-1250 (print); 1472-1465 (web)
- LCCN: 89649366
- OCLC no.: 1537306

Links
- Journal homepage; Online access; Online archives

The British Journal of Psychiatry is a peer-reviewed medical journal covering all branches of psychiatry with a particular emphasis on the clinical aspects of each topic.

The journal is owned by the Royal College of Psychiatrists and published monthly by Cambridge University Press on behalf of the college. The journal publishes original research papers from around the world as well as editorials, review articles, commentaries on contentious articles, short reports, a comprehensive book review section and correspondence column. The editor-in-chief is Professor Gin S. Malhi. The complete archive of contents from 1855 to the present is available online. All content from January 2000 on is made freely available 1 year after publication.

== History ==
The journal was established in 1853 as the Asylum Journal, changing title in 1855 to the Asylum Journal of Mental Science and changing title again to Journal of Mental Science from 1858 to 1963, when it obtained its present name.

== See also ==
- List of psychiatry journals
