= Russian Journal of Psychiatry =

- Discipline: Psychiatry
- Language: Russian, English (abstracts)
- Edited by: Zurab Kekelidze

Publication details
- History: 1997–present
- Publisher: Serbsky Center (Russia)
- Frequency: Bimonthly
- Impact factor: 0,771

Standard abbreviations
- ISO 4: Russ. J. Psychiatry

Indexing
- ISSN: 1560-957X
- OCLC no.: 750496084

Links
- Journal homepage

The Russian Journal of Psychiatry (Russian: Российский психиатрический журнал, romanized: Rossiyskiy psikhiatricheskiy zhurnal) is a Russian peer-reviewed medical journal covering the fields of clinical, social, and forensic psychiatry. It was established in 1997 by the Serbsky Center with Tatyana Dmitrieva as editor-in-chief. It was included by the Higher Attestation Commission of the Ministry of Education and Science of the Russian Federation in the list of leading journals and publications and having an article published in this journal is considered to be very prestigious among Russian psychiatrists.

== See also ==
- List of psychiatry journals
