= Political abuse of psychiatry in the Soviet Union =

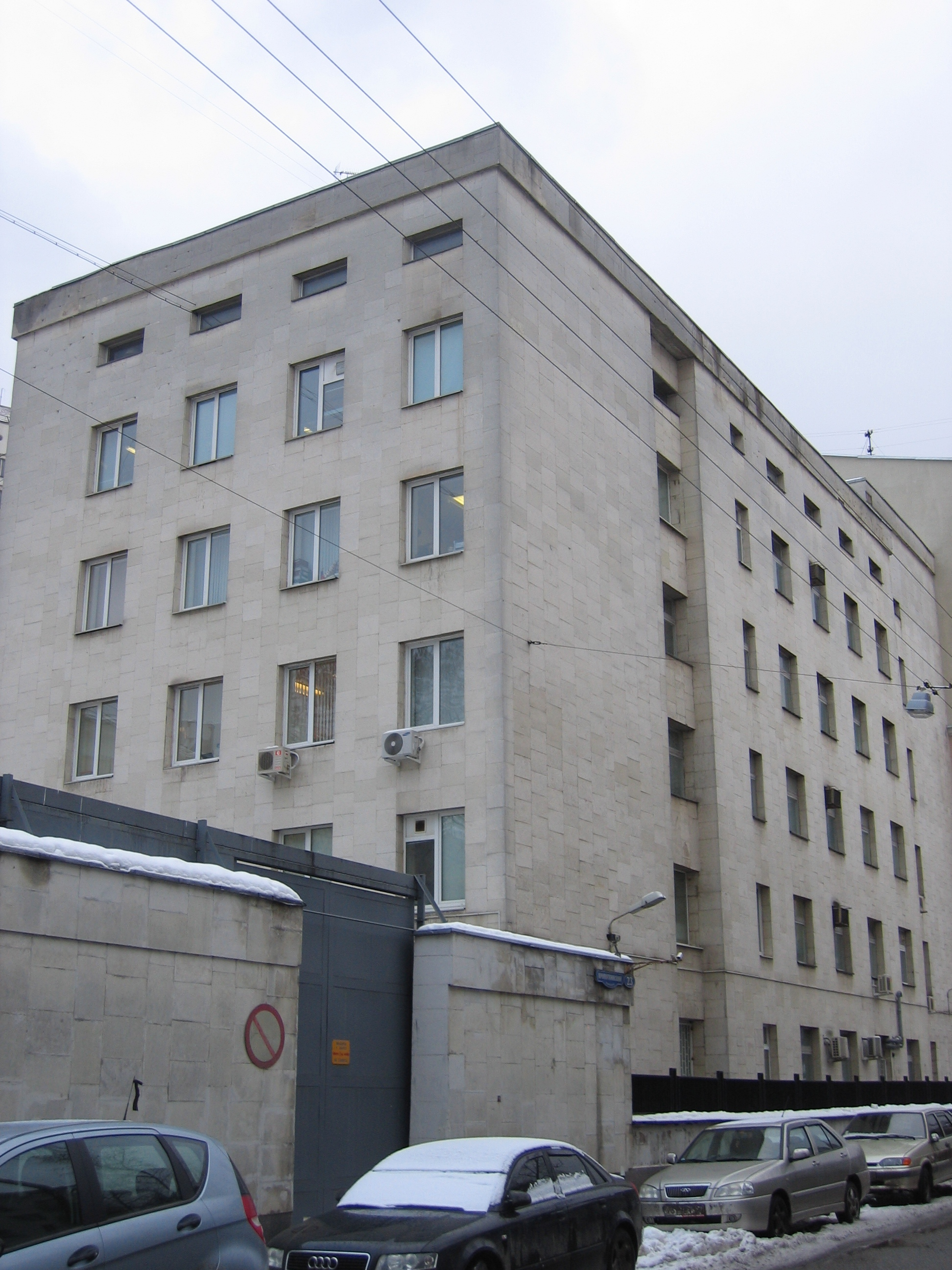
The Serbsky Central Research Institute for Forensic Psychiatry, also briefly called the Serbsky Institute (the part of its building in Moscow)

There was systematic political abuse of psychiatry in the Soviet Union, based on the interpretation of political opposition or dissent as a psychiatric problem, rather than a social, political, or material one.

The extent of this abuse depended on the time period. It started in the late 1940s and was systemic in the 1960s to the mid-1980s.

The Criminal Code was applied in conjunction with the system of diagnosis for mental illness developed by Andrei Snezhnevsky to establish a framework within which non-standard beliefs could easily be defined as criminal offences and subsequently be the basis for a psychiatric diagnosis. Diagnoses such as "sluggish schizophrenia" or "political intoxication" were applied to dissenters, who were then incarcerated in psychiatric wards with poor living conditions.

Psychiatry allowed Soviet authorities to bypass standard legal procedures and avoid the odium attached to political trials. Dissidence was also thus discredited as the result of unhealthy minds.

At least 20,000 dissenters were put in psychiatric hospitals for political crimes. Russia is still impacted by Soviet political abuse of psychiatry.

== Definition ==
Political abuse of psychiatry (Note: Many authors also use the terms "Soviet political psychiatry" or "punitive psychiatry") is the misuse of psychiatric diagnosis, detention and treatment for the purposes of obstructing the fundamental human rights of certain groups and individuals in a society.

Punitive psychiatry is based upon "the deliberate interpretation of dissent [...] as a psychiatric problem". It entails the exculpation and committal of citizens to psychiatric facilities based upon political rather than mental health-based criteria.

Punitive psychiatry is neither a distinct subject nor a psychiatric specialty. It is the result of members of the psychiatric profession serving the state's will in matters of repression – a phenomenon that happens in the applied sciences of many totalitarian countries.

== Mechanisms ==
=== Motives ===
The diagnosis of mental disease can give the state license to detain persons against their will and insist upon therapy both in the interest of the detainee and in the broader interests of society. In addition, receiving a psychiatric diagnosis is itself oppressive.

Punitive medicine (punitive psychiatry) is used to repress dissidents that cannot be punished by legal means. Psychiatry can be used to bypass standard legal procedures for establishing guilt or innocence and allow political incarceration without the ordinary odium attached to such political trials.

Psychiatric power in practically all societies expands on the grounds of public safety, which, in the USSR, was best maintained by the repression of dissidence. The definition of danger was radically extended by the Soviet criminal system to cover "political" as well as customary physical types of "danger".

Sending dissenters to psychiatrists also discredited dissidence as the product of unhealthy minds.

=== Diagnosis ===
Forensic psychiatrists were asked to examine offenders whose mental state was considered abnormal by the investigating officers. People could also be hospitalized on the request of their headman, their relatives or a district psychiatrist.

Dissidents were almost always examined at the Serbsky Central Research Institute for Forensic Psychiatry in Moscow, where they were subjected to a forensic-psychiatric expert evaluation. Patients could also be examined by prison doctors or at clinics.

The "anti-Soviet" political behavior of some individuals was defined simultaneously as criminal acts (e.g., a violation of Articles 70 (Note: Agitation and propaganda against the Soviet state) or 190–1 (Note: Dissemination of false fabrications defaming the Soviet state and social system)), symptoms of mental illness (e.g., "delusion of reformism"), and susceptible to a ready-made diagnosis (e.g., "sluggish schizophrenia", "political intoxication" or "philosophical intoxication"). The explanation of dissent as a psychiatric problem was called "psychopathological mechanisms" of dissent.

The accused had no right of appeal. The right was given to their relatives or other interested persons, who were not allowed to nominate psychiatrists to evaluate the patient. All psychiatrists were considered equally credible before the law and fully independent.

The political abuse of psychiatry in the USSR arose from the conception that opponents of the Soviet regime were sick since there was no other logical reason to oppose the best sociopolitical system.

==== Types of persecuted dissidence ====
The psychiatric incarceration of certain individuals was prompted by their attempts to emigrate, to distribute or possess prohibited documents or books, to participate in civil rights protests and demonstrations, to be involved in forbidden religious activities and to write critical books.

Victims of soviet psychiatric abuse, by group, per share of dissidents repressed by psychiatry
Group	Share (%)
Advocates of human rights or democratization	~50%
Nationalists	~10%
Would-be emigrants	~20%
Religious believers	~15%
Citizens inconvenient to the authorities (Note: Due to their complaints about bureaucratic excesses and abuses)	~5%

==== Classification of mental disorders ====
Political abuse of psychiatry in the Soviet Union was facilitated by the fact that the national classification included categories that could be employed to label dissenters, who could then be forcibly incarcerated and medicated.

Andrei Snezhnevsky developed a novel classification of mental disorders with an original set of diagnostic criteria. Despite a number of its controversial premises, Snezhnevsky's hypothesis immediately acquired the status of dogma, in line with the traditions of then Soviet science. This dogma was later overcome in other disciplines but firmly stuck in psychiatry.

"Philosophical intoxication", for instance, was widely applied when people disagreed with nomenklatura or party leadership, or criticized sanctioned political philosophies, theory or the theoreticians who conceived them. When the dissidents were themselves communists, they were also accused of "revisionism".

Andrei Snezhnevsky was essentially responsible for the Soviet concept of schizophrenia with a "sluggish type" manifestation by "reformerism" including other symptoms. It was the most prominently diagnosis used in cases of dissidents. It could be applied to nearly any behavior deemed abnormal or asocial. Pessimism, poor social adaptation and conflict with authorities were themselves sufficient for a formal diagnosis of "sluggish schizophrenia".

According to most scholars, psychiatrists involved in the development of sluggish schizophrenia were following directives from the Communist Party and the secret service, and were well aware of its eventual political uses. Nevertheless, for many Soviet psychiatrists, "sluggish schizophrenia" was a logical explanation for the behavior of critics who seemed willing to jeopardize their happiness, family, and career for a reformist conviction that was so divergent from the prevailing social and political orthodoxy.

=== Incarceration ===
The incarceration of free thinking healthy people in madhouses is spiritual murder, it is a variation of the gas chamber, even more cruel; the torture of the people being killed is more malicious and more prolonged. Like the gas chambers, these crimes will never be forgotten and those involved in them will be condemned for all time during their life and after their death. (Alexander Solzhenitsyn)

In the Soviet Union, dissidents were often confined in psychiatric wards commonly called psikhushkas. One of the first penal psikhushkas was the Psychiatric Prison Hospital in Kazan, which in 1939 was transferred to the NKVD's control on the orders of Lavrentiy Beria.

Many dissidents were sent to regular psychiatric hospitals, which were unhygienic, overcrowded and often run by drunks and sadists. Dissidents who were considered more dangerous were sent to "special psychiatric hospitals", which were run by the MVD and were alike to prisons.

There, they would be subjected to forced administration of drugs, (Note: Including insulin to non-diabetics and other drugs with severe side effects.) beatings electric shocks, lumbar punctures and other forms of treatment or punishment. Many went crazy and some died during treatment. Patients had no rights and were entirely dependent on the psychiatrists' wills. They were only protected by rules put in place by legal and medical departments.

Hospitalization did not have an end date, and, as a result, there were cases when dissidents were kept in psychiatric prison hospitals for 10 or even 15 years. The duration of the treatment was chosen entirely by the psychiatrist. Dissidents would be freed once they recanted their previous convictions and admitted that mental illness had caused them to criticize the Soviet system.

== History ==
=== During Stalin's regime (1948–1953) ===
As early as 1948, the Soviet secret service took an interest in psychiatry. A system of political abuse of psychiatry was developed at the end of Joseph Stalin's regime. The use of psychiatry as a political weapon was ordered by Andrey Vyshinsky, a chief of the secret police.

Punitive psychiatry was not simply an inheritance from the Stalin era, however. The Gulag was already an effective instrument of political repression. There was no compelling reason to develop a more expensive substitute such as punitive psychiatry.

The USSR did not have legislative acts regulating psychiatry until 1988 as the patient was seen as a burden to society.

==== The Joint Session (October 1951) ====
A precursor to later abuses in psychiatry in the Soviet Union, the "Joint Session" of the USSR Academy of Medical Sciences and the Board of the All-Union Neurological and Psychiatric Association took place from 10 to 15 October 1951. The event was dedicated to the Russian physiologist Ivan Pavlov.

During the session, it was alleged that several of the USSR's leading neuroscientists and psychiatrists of the time were guilty of practicing "anti-Pavlovian, anti-Marxist, idealistic [and] reactionary" science, much to Soviet psychiatry's detriment. These eminent psychiatrists had to publicly recant their scientific positions and promise to conform to "Pavlovian" doctrines.

Several leading Soviet academic neuroscientists were labeled as anti-Pavlovians, anti-materialists and reactionaries and were subsequently dismissed from their positions. Some of these scientists were also imprisoned and tortured. The Joint Session ravaged research in neuroscience and psychiatry for years to come, which came to be dominated by pseudo-science.

Following the Pavlovian session and the Joint Session, Snezhnevky's school became predominant. It was given monopoly over psychiatry in 1950 – an important factor in the rise of political psychiatry. Motivated by Snezhnevky, Soviet doctors devised a "Pavlovian theory of schizophrenia" and increasingly applied this diagnostic category to political dissidents.

=== During Khrushchev's regime (1953–1964) ===
The campaign to declare political opponents mentally sick and commit dissenters to mental hospitals began in the late 1950s and early 1960s. Nikita Khrushchev asserted that it was impossible for members of a socialist society to be anti-socialist. Whenever dissidence could not be justified as a provocation of imperialism or a legacy of the past, they were labelled as the product of mental illness.

A crime is a deviation from generally recognized standards of behavior frequently caused by mental disorder. Can there be diseases, nervous disorders among certain people in a Communist society? Evidently yes. If that is so, then there will also be offences, which are characteristic of people with abnormal minds. Of those who might start calling for opposition to Communism on this basis, we can say that clearly their mental state is not normal.

— Nikita Khrushchev, Speech published in Pravda, 24 May 1959

By the end of the 1950s, confinement to psychiatric institutions had become the most common method to punish leaders of the political opposition.

The atmosphere at the Serbsky Institute in Moscow altered almost overnight when Daniil Lunts took over as head of the Fourth Department (otherwise known as the Political Department). Psychiatric departments had previously been regarded as a 'refuge' against being dispatched to the Gulag. The first reports of dissenters being hospitalized on non-medical grounds date from the early 1960s, not long after Georgy Morozov was appointed director of the Serbsky Institute.

==== Struggle against abuse ====
In the 1960s and 1970s, the trials of dissenters and their referral for "treatment" to the Special Psychiatric Hospitals under MVD control and oversight became known to the world. This wave of "psychiatric terror" was flatly denied by the leaders of the Serbsky Institute. The Soviet practice of incarcerating political dissidents in mental hospitals entailed strong condemnation from the international community and damaged the credibility of psychiatry in the Soviet Union.

In the 1960s, a vigorous movement grew protesting the abuse of psychiatry in the USSR. Political abuse of psychiatry in the Soviet Union was denounced in the course of the Congresses of the World Psychiatric Association in Mexico City (1971), Hawaii (1977), Vienna (1983) and Athens (1989). The campaign to terminate political abuse of psychiatry in the USSR was a key episode in the Cold War, inflicting irretrievable damage on the prestige of medicine in the Soviet Union.

=== During Brezhnev's regime (1964–1982) ===
From the 1960s to 1986, psychiatry was systematically abused for political purposes in the Soviet Union. Dissidents came to be prosecuted under the principle of socialist legality. It became apparent that putting people who gave anti-Soviet speeches on trial was detrimental to the regime. Such individuals were instead given a psychiatric examination and declared insane.

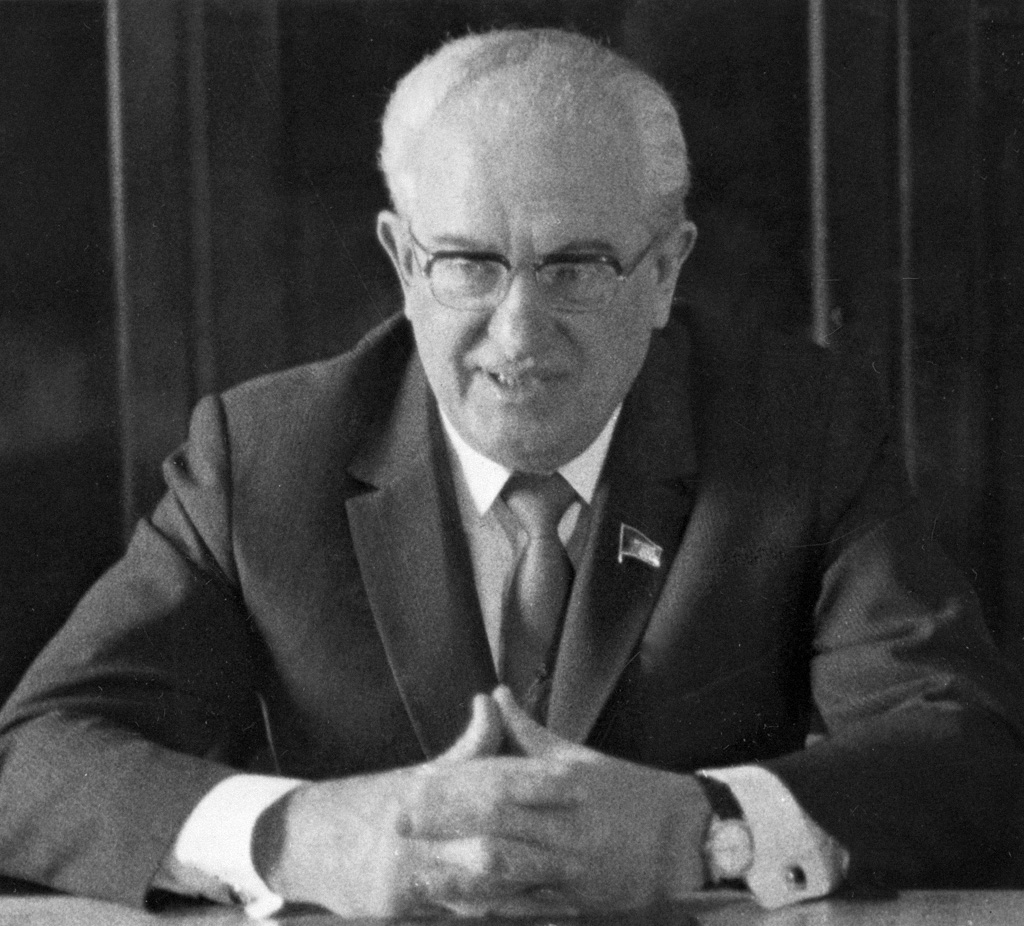
Yuri Andropov (1914–1984), a KGB Chairman and General Secretary of the CPSU

Political abuse of psychiatry as a systematic method of repression was developed by Yuri Andropov with a group of associates, in the KGB. Andropov was responsible for a wide-range of psychiatric repression as soon as he was appointed as head the KGB on 18 May 1967. On 29 April 1969, Andropov submitted a plan to the Central Committee of the Communist Party of the Soviet Union to set up a network of mental hospitals to repress dissenters. Andropov's proposal was adopted and implemented.

On 15 May 1969, a Soviet Government decree (No. 345–209) was issued, confirming the practice of psychiatrists confining undesirables in detention. Soviet psychiatrists given individuals to examine could either have the police detain them or entrap them into coming to the hospital. Court decisions were not required to confine an individual indefinitely in a psychiatric institution.

From the mid-1970s to the 1990s, the structure of the USSR mental health service was split in two distinct systems which for the most part co-existed peacefully. The first system was that of punitive psychiatry. It directly served the authorities, and was headed by the Moscow Institute for Forensic Psychiatry. The second system was made up of elite, psychotherapeutically oriented clinics. It was headed by the Leningrad Psychoneurological Institute. Hospitals of the Soviet Union combined elements of both systems.

If dissidents were mentally ill, they were sent to psychiatric hospitals and confined there until they died. If the state of their mental health was uncertain but they were not constantly unwell, they and their kharakteristika [testimonial from employers, the Party and other Soviet institutions] were sent to a labour camp or shot.

=== Under Andropov's regime (1982–1984) ===
As General Secretary, Yuri Andropov continued the Brezhnev era policy of confining dissenters in mental hospitals.

=== Until the fall of the Soviet Union (1984–1991) ===
In 1988 and 1989, between one million and two million people were removed from the psychiatric registry in the Soviet Union at the request of Western psychiatrists. It was a condition for the re-admission of Soviet psychiatrists to the World Psychiatric Association.

=== After the fall of the Soviet Union (from 1991) ===
According to the "Commentary" to the post-Soviet Russian Federation Law on Psychiatric Care, individuals forced to undergo treatment in Soviet psychiatric medical institutions were entitled to rehabilitation and could claim compensation. The Russian Federation acknowledged that psychiatry had been used for political purposes and took responsibility for the victims of "political psychiatry".

From 1993 to 1995, a presidential decree on measures to prevent future abuse of psychiatry was being drafted at the Commission for Rehabilitation of the Victims of Political Repression. When the material for discussion was ready, work came to a standstill. The documents failed to reach the head of the Commission Alexander Yakovlev.

Since the fall of the Soviet Union, political abuse of psychiatry has continued in Russia. Human rights activists face the threat of psychiatric diagnosis for their civic and political activities.

== Residual problems ==
=== Stigmas ===
Psychiatric labels, or stigmas, have spread so widely that the media commonly calls disliked persons schizo and apply generalized psychiatric assessments to phenomena of public life. The word psikhushka entered everyday vocabulary. Deviants to usual standards of thought and behavior are declared mentally ill. Because of this stigmatization, people with actual mental disorders avoid publicity at all cost.

Russian patients are defensive toward medical psychologists and psychiatrists, preventing attempts to understand them and assess their condition. The psychiatrist is feared, not confided in, not told secrets and asked only to provide medication. This disposition is related to a constant, subconscious fear of psychiatrists and psychiatry caused by the abuse of psychiatry and the constant violence in the totalitarian and post-totalitarian society.

=== Integrity of psychiatry ===
Psychiatry lost its credibility and professional basis entirely when it was abused to stifle dissidence in the USSR. According to St Petersburg psychiatrist Vladimir Pshizov, a disastrous factor for domestic psychiatry is that those who had committed crimes against humanity were allowed to stay on their positions until their death.

Psychiatry is vulnerable because many of its notions have been questioned, and the sustainable pattern of mental life, of boundaries of mental norm and abnormality has been lost, director of the Moscow Research Institute for Psychiatry Valery Krasnov says, adding that psychiatrists have to seek new reference points to make clinical assessments and new reference points to justify old therapeutical interventions.

Modern Russian psychiatry and the structure of mental health care are aimed not at protecting the patient's right to an own place in life, but at discrediting such a right, revealing symptoms and isolating the patient.

=== Modern political abuse of psychiatry ===
Critics allege that practically nothing has changed at the Serbky institute, as the people who worked there in Soviet times are still working there. The Serbsky Institute is claimed to still be subservient to the State.

In 2007, Alexander Dugin, a professor at the Moscow State University and adviser to State Duma speaker Sergei Naryshkin, presented opponents of Vladimir Putin's policy as mentally ill by saying, "There are no longer opponents of Putin's policy, and if there are, they are mentally ill and should be sent to prophylactic health examination." In 2012, psychiatrist Dilya Enikeyeva gave and publicized the diagnosis in absentia of histrionic personality disorder to Kseniya Sobchak, a Russian TV anchor and member of the political opposition, in violation of medical privacy and medical ethics. She also stated that Sobchak was harmful to society.

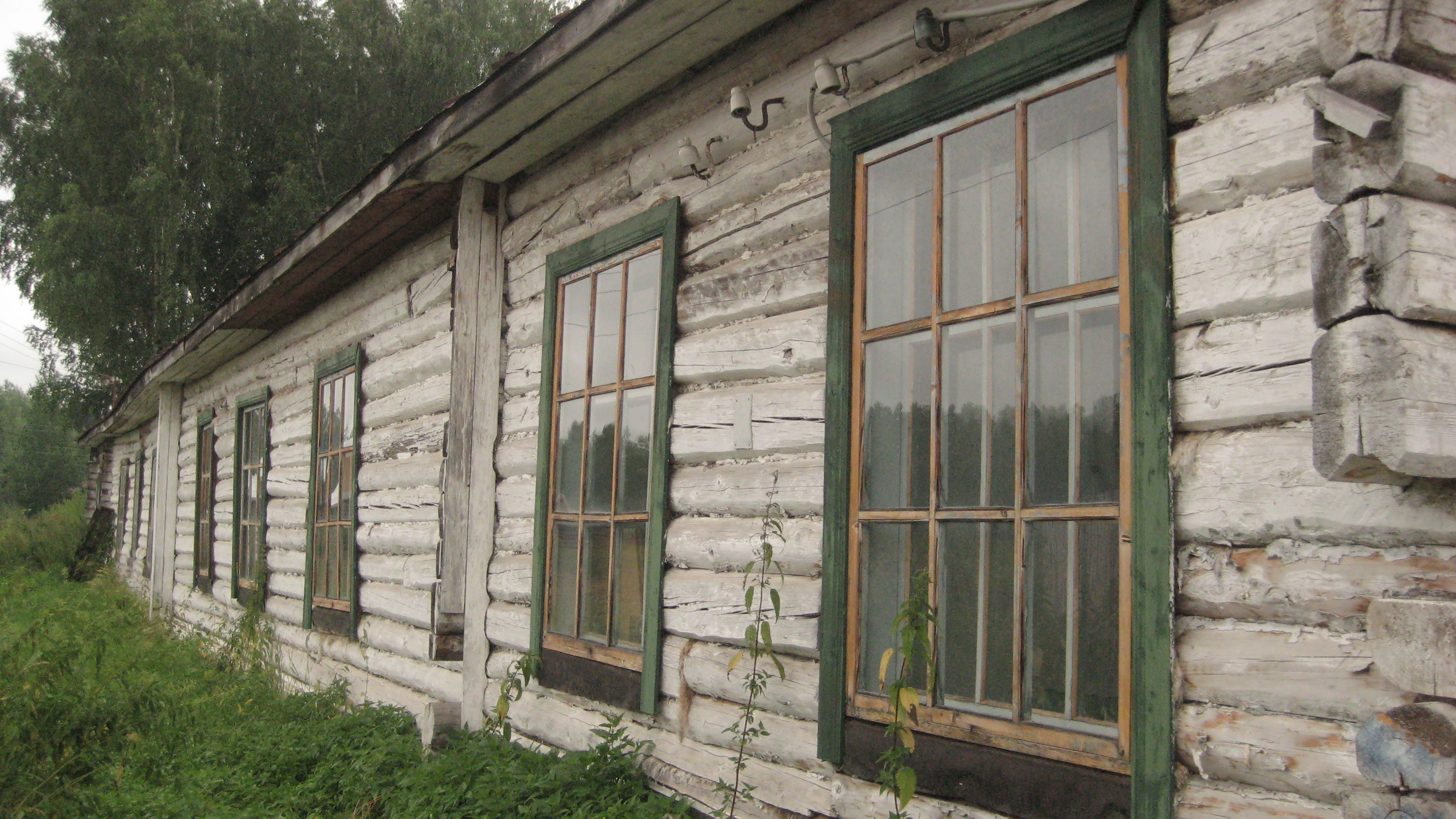
Exterior of a building in former Gulag Perm-36. It is one of a type of building in which Russian psychiatric hospitals have often been located.

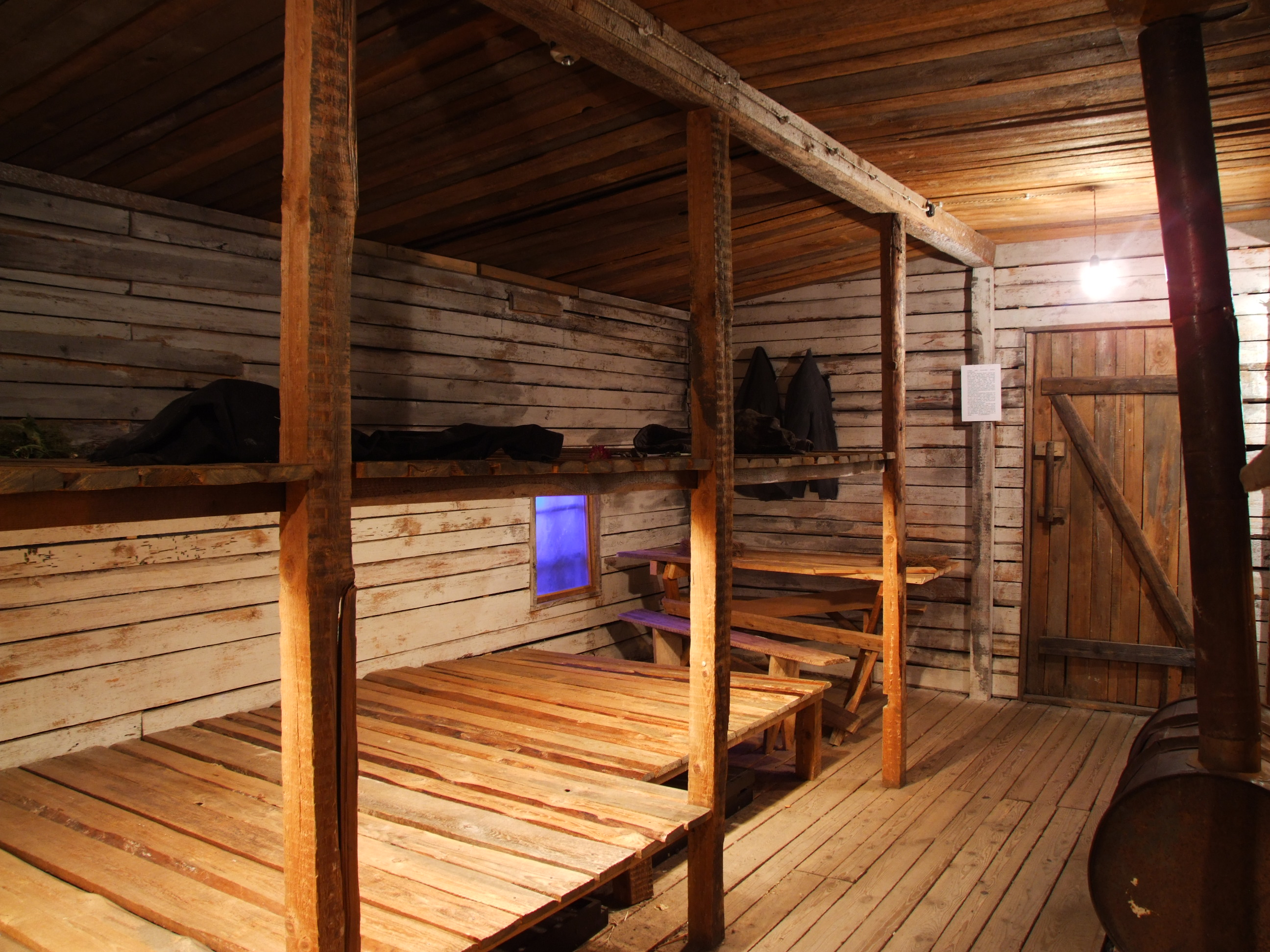
Interior of a Gulag building reconstruction in the Museum of the Occupation of Latvia

According to the commentary by the Independent Psychiatric Association of Russia on the 2007 text by Vladimir Rotstein, a doctrinist of Snezhnevsky's school, there are patients with delusion of reformism in psychiatric inpatient facilities for involuntary treatment. In 2012, delusion of reformism was a symptom of mental disorder according to Psychiatry. National Manual. In the same year, Vladimir Pashkovsky reported that he diagnosed 4.7 percent of 300 patients with delusion of reform. Patients are also said to be suffering from "syndrome of litigiousness" if in addition they wrote complaints to Moscow, which should only be written by a reviewing authority or lawyer.

An official at the Serbsky Institute declared "patient" Vladimir Bukovsky, who was then going to run for the President of the Russian Federation, undoubtedly "psychopathic".

=== Revisionism ===
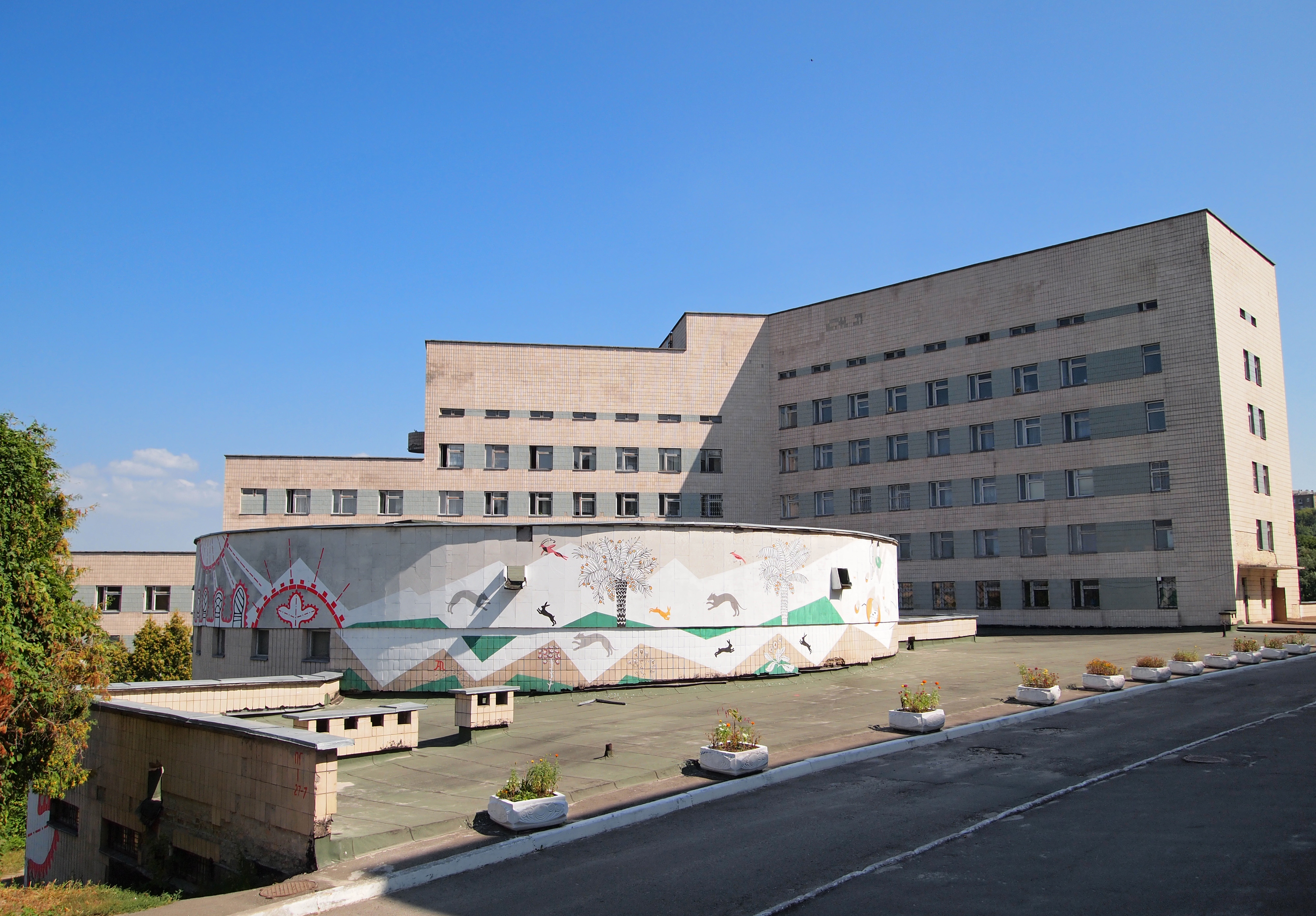
One of the buildings of the Pavlov Psychiatric Hospital in Kyiv

In 1994, a conference concerning the political abuse of psychiatry was attended by representatives from several former Soviet Republics including Russia, Belarus, the Baltics, the Caucasus, and some of the Central Asian Republics. Dainius Puras made a report on the situation within the Lithuanian Psychiatric Association, where discussion had been held but no resolution had been passed. Yuri Nuller talked over how in Russia the wind direction was gradually changing and the systematic political abuse of psychiatry was again being denied and degraded as an issue of "hyperdiagnosis" or "scientific disagreement".

The political abuse of psychiatry in the Soviet Union has been minimized by psychiatrist Fedor Kondratev and Tatyana Dmitrieva, and denied by Alan A. Stone, Mikhail Vinogradov, Aleksandr Tiganov, Anatoly Smulevich and many leaders of Russian psychiatry. (Note: Especially those related to the establishment of the Soviet period) According to Valery Krasnov and Isaak Gurovich, official representatives of psychiatry involved in its political abuse never acknowledged the groundlessness of their diagnostics and actions.

== Scale of repression ==
The Commission has also considered such a complex, socially relevant issue, as the use of psychiatry for political purposes. The collected documents and materials allow us to say that the extrajudicial procedure of admission to psychiatric hospitals was used for compulsory hospitalization of persons whose behavior was viewed by the authorities as "suspicious" from the political point of view. According to the incomplete data, hundreds of thousands of people have been illegally placed to psychiatric institutions of the country over the years of Soviet power. The rehabilitation of these people was limited, at best, to their removal from the registry of psychiatric patients and usually remains so today, due to gaps in the legislation.

— Commission for Rehabilitation of the Victims of Political Repression, 2000

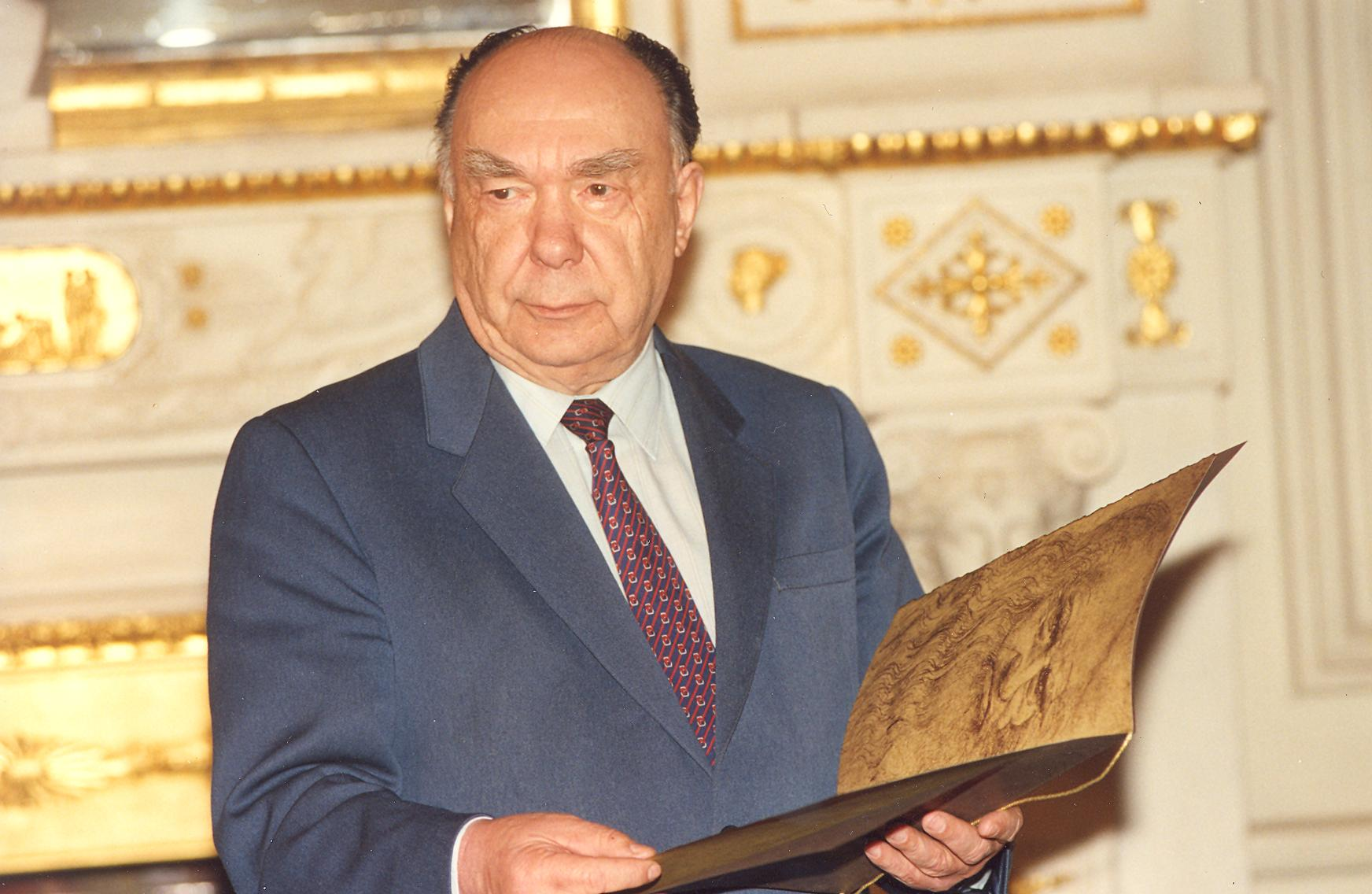
Alexander Yakovlev (1923–2005), the head of the Commission for Rehabilitation of the Victims of Political Repression

The scale of psychiatric abuses in the past, the use of psychiatric doctrines by the totalitarian state have been thoroughly concealed. Relevant archives remain closed to researchers.

Classified government documents that became available after the dissolution of the Soviet Union confirm that the authorities consciously used psychiatry as a tool to suppress dissent.

According to data of the International Association on the Political Use of Psychiatry's archives, thousands of dissenters were hospitalized for political reasons. From 1994 to 1995, an investigative commission of Moscow psychiatrists explored the records of five prison psychiatric hospitals in Russia and discovered about two thousand cases of political abuse of psychiatry in these hospitals alone.

According to Anatoly Prokopenko's calculations based on what he found in top secret documents in 2004, about 15,000 people were confined for political crimes in the psychiatric prison hospitals under the control of the MVD. In 2005, using the Archives of the CPSU Central Committee and the records of the three Special Psychiatrial Hospitals (Sychyovskaya, Leningrad and Chernyakhovsk hospitals), Prokopenko concluded that psychiatry had been used as punitive measure against at least 20,000 people for purely political reasons.

The percentage of "the mentally ill" among those accused of so-called anti-Soviet activities proved many times higher than among criminal offenders. The attention paid to political prisoners by Soviet psychiatrists was more than 40 times greater than their attention to ordinary criminal offenders.

The report on political abuse of psychiatry prepared at the request of the commission by Gushansky with the aid of Prokopenko lay unclaimed and even the Independent Psychiatric Journal (Nezavisimiy Psikhiatricheskiy Zhurnal) would not publish it. The Moscow Research Center for Human Rights and the Independent Psychiatric Association of Russia were asked by Gushansky to publish the materials and archival documents on punitive psychiatry but showed no interest in doing so. The publishing such documents is dictated by present-day needs and by how far it is feared that psychiatry could again be abused for non-medical purposes.

== Notable victims ==
- Vladimir Bukovsky
- Yuli Daniel
- Alexander Esenin-Volpin
- Viktor Fainberg
- Yuri Galanskov
- Vladimir Gershuni
- Natalya Gorbanevskaya
- Petro Grigorenko
- Michaš Kukabaka
- Yegor Letov
- Zhores Medvedev
- Viktor Nekipelov
- Valeriya Novodvorskaya
- Leonid Plyushch
- Alexander Tarasov
- Valery Tarsis
- Aleksandr Skobov

== Documents and memoirs ==
The evidence for the misuse of psychiatry for political purposes in the Soviet Union was documented in a number of articles and books. Several national psychiatric associations examined and acted upon this documentation.

The widely known sources including published and written memoirs by victims of psychiatric arbitrariness convey moral and physical sufferings experienced by the victims in special psychiatric hospitals of the USSR.

=== Professional associations and Human Rights groups ===
Various documents and reports were published in the Information Bulletin of the Working Commission on the Abuse of Psychiatry For Political Purposes, and circulated in the samizdat periodical Chronicle of Current Events. Other sources were documents by the Moscow Helsinki Group and in books by Alexander Podrabinek (Punitive Medicine, 1979) Anatoly Prokopenko (Mad Psychiatry, 1997, "Безумная психитрия") and Vladimir Bukovsky (Judgment in Moscow, 1994). To these may be added Soviet psychiatry – fallacies and fantasy by Ada Korotenko and Natalia Alikina ("Советская психиатрия. Заблуждения и умысел") and Executed by Madness, 1971 ("Казнимые сумасшествием").

In 1972, 1975, 1976, 1984, and 1988 the United States Government Printing Office published documents on political abuse of psychiatry in the Soviet Union .

From 1987 to 1991, the International Association on the Political Use of Psychiatry (IAPUP) published forty-two volumes of Documents on the Political Abuse of Psychiatry in the USSR. Today these are preserved by the Columbia University Libraries in the archival collection entitled Human Rights Watch Records: Helsinki Watch, 1952–2003, Series VII: Chris Panico Files, 1979–1992, USSR, Psychiatry, International Association on the Political Use of Psychiatry, Box 16, Folder 5–8 (English version) and Box 16, Folder 9–11 (Russian version).

In 1992, the British Medical Association published certain some documents on the subject in Medicine Betrayed: The Participation of Doctors in Human Rights Abuses.

=== Memoirs ===
In 1978, the book I Vozvrashchaetsa Veter... (And the Wind Returns...) by Vladimir Bukovsky, describing the dissident movement, their struggle or freedom, practices of dealing with dissenters, and dozen years spent by Bukovsky in Soviet labor camps, prisons and psychiatric hospitals, was published and later translated into English under the title To Build a Castle: My Life as a Dissenter.

In 1979, Leonid Plyushch published his book Na Karnavale Istorii (At History's Сarnival) in which he described how he and other dissidents were committed to psychiatric hospitals. The same year, the book was translated into English under the title History's Carnival: A Dissident's Autobiography.

In 1980, the book by Yuri Belov Razmyshlenia ne tolko o Sychovke: Roslavl 1978 (Reflections not only on Sychovka: Roslavl 1978) was published.

In 1981, Pyotr Grigorenko published his memoirs V Podpolye Mozhno Vstretit Tolko Krys (In Underground One Can Meet Only Rats), which included the story of his psychiatric examinations and hospitalizations. In 1982, the book was translated into English under the title Memoirs.

In 1982, Soviet philosopher Pyotr Abovin-Yegides published his article "Paralogizmy politseyskoy psikhiatrii i ikh sootnoshenie s meditsinskoy etikoy (Paralogisms of police psychiatry and their relation to medical ethics)."

In 1983, Evgeny Nikolaev's book Predavshie Gippokrata (Betrayers of Hippocrates), when translated from Russian into German under the title Gehirnwäsche in Moskau (Brainwashing in Moscow), first came out in Munich and told about psychiatric detention of its author for political reasons. In 1984, the book under its original title was first published in Russian which the book had originally been written in.

In 1983, Yuri Vetokhin published his memoirs Sklonen k Pobegu translated into English under the title Inclined to Escape in 1986.

In 1987, Robert van Voren published his book Koryagin: A man Struggling for Human Dignity telling about psychiatrist Anatoly Koryagin who resisted political abuse of psychiatry in the Soviet Union.

In 1988, Reportazh iz Niotkuda (Reportage from Nowhere) by Viktor Rafalsky was published. In the publication, he described his confinement in Soviet psychiatric hospitals.

In 1993, Valeriya Novodvorskaya published her collection of writings Po Tu Storonu Otchayaniya (Beyond Despair) in which her experience in the prison psychiatric hospital in Kazan was described.

In 1996, Vladimir Bukovsky published his book Moskovsky Protsess (Moscow trial) containing an account of developing the punitive psychiatry based on documents that were being submitted to and considered by the Politburo of the Central Committee of the Communist Party of the Soviet Union. The book was translated into English in 1998 under the title Reckoning With Moscow: A Nuremberg Trial for Soviet Agents and Western Fellow Travelers.

In 2001, Nikolay Kupriyanov published his book GULAG-2-SN which has a foreword by Anatoly Sobchak, covers repressive psychiatry in Soviet Army, and tells about humiliations Kupriyanov underwent in the psychiatric departments of the Northern Fleet hospital and the Kirov Military Medical Academy.

In 2002, St. Petersburg forensic psychiatrist Vladimir Pshizov published his book Sindrom Zamknutogo Prostranstva (Syndrome of Closed Space) describing the hospitalization of Viktor Fainberg.

In 2003, the book Moyа Sudba i Moyа Borba protiv Psikhiatrov (My Destiny and My Struggle against Psychiatrists) was published by Anatoly Serov, who worked as a lead design engineer before he was committed to a psychiatric hospital.

In 2010, Alexander Shatravka published his book Pobeg iz Raya (Escape from Paradise) in which he described how he and his companions were caught after they illegally crossed the border between Finland and the Soviet Union to escape from the latter country and, as a result, were confined to Soviet psychiatric hospitals and prisons. In his book, he also described methods of brutal treatment of prisoners in the institutions.

In 2012, Soviet dissident and believer Vladimir Khailo's wife published her book Subjected to Intense Persecution.

2014 saw the book Zha Zholtoy Stenoy (Behind the Yellow Wall) by Alexander Avgust, a former inmate of Soviet psychiatric hospitals who in his book describes the wider circle of their inhabitants than literature on the issue usually does.

=== Literary works ===
In 1965, Valery Tarsis published in the West his book Ward 7: An Autobiographical Novel based upon his own experiences in 1963–1964 when he was detained in the Moscow Kashchenko psychiatric hospital for political reasons. The book was the first literary work to deal with the Soviet authorities' abuse of psychiatry.

In 1968, the Russian poet Joseph Brodsky wrote Gorbunov and Gorchakov, a forty-page long poem in thirteen cantos consisting of lengthy conversations between two patients in a Soviet psychiatric prison as well as between each of them separately and the interrogating psychiatrists. The topics vary from the taste of the cabbage served for supper to the meaning of life and Russia's destiny. The poem was translated into English by Harry Thomas. The experience underlying Gorbunov and Gorchakov was formed by two stints of Brodsky at psychiatric establishments.

In 1977, British playwright Tom Stoppard wrote the play Every Good Boy Deserves Favour that criticized the Soviet practice of treating political dissidence as a form of mental illness. The play is dedicated to Viktor Fainberg and Vladimir Bukovsky, two Soviet dissidents expelled to the West.

In the 1983 novel Firefox Down by Craig Thomas, captured American pilot Mitchell Gant is imprisoned in a KGB psychiatric clinic "associated with the Serbsky Institute", where he is drugged and interrogated to force him to reveal the location of the Firefox aircraft, which he has stolen and flown out of Russia.

== See also ==
- 1968 Red Square demonstration
- Civil commitment
- Political abuse of psychiatry in the United States
- Struggle against political abuse of psychiatry in the Soviet Union
- The Protest Psychosis: How Schizophrenia Became a Black Disease
- Socialist Patients' Collective, Marxist anti-psychiatry group

== Sources ==
Archival sources

- "Выписка из протокола № 151 заседания Политбюро ЦК КПСС от 22 января 1970 года" [The extract from the minutes No. 151 of the meeting of the Politburo of the Central Committee of the Communist Party of the Soviet Union of 22 January 1970] (PDF) (in Russian). Soviet Archives, collected by Vladimir Bukovsky. 22 January 1970. Archived (PDF) from the original on 14 May 2012.
- "Documents on the Political Abuse of Psychiatry in the USSR". Human Rights Watch Records, Record Group 7: Helsinki Watch, 1952–2003 (Bulk, 1978–1994) HR# 0002. Series VII: Chris Panico Files, 1979–1992. Columbia University Libraries, Archival Collection:Rare Book and Manuscript Library Collections. Archived from the original on 12 March 2012.

Government publications and official reports

- Abuse of psychiatry for political repression in the Soviet Union: Hearing, Ninety-second Congress, second session, Part 1. Washington, D.C.: U.S. Government Printing Office. 1972.
- Abuse of psychiatry for political repression in the Soviet Union: Hearing, Ninety-second Congress, second session, Volume 2. Washington, D.C.: U.S. Government Printing Office. 1975.
- Abuse of psychiatry in the Soviet Union: hearing before the Subcommittee on Human Rights and International Organizations of the Committee on Foreign Affairs and the Commission on Security and Cooperation in Europe, House of Representatives, Ninety-eighth Congress, first session, September 20, 1983. Washington, D.C.: U.S. Government Printing Office. 1984.
- British Medical Association (1992). Medicine betrayed: the participation of doctors in human rights abuses. Zed Books. ISBN 1-85649-104-8.
- Commission for Rehabilitation of the Victims of Political Repression (2000). Доклад Комиссии при Президенте Российской Федерации по реабилитации жертв политических репрессий о ходе исполнения Закона Российской Федерации "О реабилитации жертв политических репрессий" [The report by the Commission under the President of the Russian Federation for rehabilitation of the victims of political repression on the course of executing the Law of the Russian Federation "On rehabilitation of the victims of political repression"] (in Russian). Moscow. Archived from the original on 30 May 2013.
- Psychiatric abuse of political prisoners in the Soviet Union: testimony by Leonid Plyushch: hearing before the Subcommittee on International Organizations of the Committee on International Relations, House of Representatives, Ninety-fourth Congress, second session, March 30, 1976. Washington, D.C.: U.S. Government Printing Office. 1976.
- U.S. Department of State, Commission on Security and Cooperation in Europe (1989). "Report of the U.S. Delegation to Assess Recent Changes in Soviet Psychiatry" (PDF). Schizophrenia Bulletin. 15 (4 Suppl): 1–79. doi:10.1093/schbul/15.suppl_1.1. PMID 2638045. Archived from the original (PDF) on 29 November 2015.
- Reform and human rights: the Gorbachev record. Washington, D.C.: U.S. Government Printing Office. 1988.
- "Report of the U.S. Delegation to Assess Recent Changes in Soviet Psychiatry (Russian translation)" (PDF) (in Russian). Global Initiative on Psychiatry. 2009 [1989]. Archived (PDF) from the original on 7 April 2014.

Books

- Albats, Yevgenia (1995). KGB: state within a state. I.B.Tauris. ISBN 1-85043-995-8.
- Andreyev, Galina (2012). Subjected to Intense Persecution. Xulon Press. ISBN 978-1-62230-406-6.
- Applebaum, Anne (2003). Gulag: A History. Doubleday. ISBN 1-4000-3409-4.
- Artyomova, A.; Rar, L.; Slavinsky M. [А. Артёмова, Л. Рар, М. Славинский] (1971). Казнимые сумасшествием: Сборник документальных материалов о психиатрических преследованиях инакомыслящих в СССР [The executed by madness: a collection of documentary materials about psychiatric persecutions of dissenters in the USSR] (PDF) (in Russian). Frankfurt am Main: Посев (Posev publishers).
- Avgust, Alexander [Александр Август] (2014). За жёлтой стеной (сборник) [Behind the Yellow Wall (collection)] (in Russian). Издательские решения [Publishing solutions]. ISBN 978-5457623866.
- Barańczak, Stanisław (1990). Breathing under water and other East European essays. Harvard University Press. ISBN 0-674-08125-0.
- Belov, Yuri [Юрий Белов] (1980). Размышления не только о Сычёвке: Рославль 1978 [Reflections not only on Sychovka: Roslavl 1978] (in Russian). Frankfurt am Main: Посев (Posev publishers).
- Birstein, Vadim (2004). The perversion of knowledge: the true story of the Soviet science. Westview Press. ISBN 0-8133-4280-5.
- Bloch, Sidney; Reddaway, Peter (1977). Russia's political hospitals: The abuse of psychiatry in the Soviet Union. Victor Gollancz Ltd. ISBN 0-575-02318-X.
- Bloch, Sidney; Reddaway, Peter (1985). Soviet psychiatric abuse: the shadow over world psychiatry. Westview Press. ISBN 0-8133-0209-9.
- Brintlinger, Angela; Vinitsky, Ilya (2007). Madness and the mad in Russian culture. University of Toronto Press. ISBN 978-0-8020-9140-6.
- Bukovsky, Vladimir [Владимир Буковский] (1978a). И возвращается ветер... [And the wind returns...] (PDF) (in Russian). New York: Хроника [Chronicle]. Archived 3 February 2010 at the Wayback Machine
- Bukovsky, Vladimir (1978b). To build a castle: my life as a dissenter (PDF). London: Andrei Deutsch. ISBN 0-233-97023-1. Archived from the original (PDF) on 1 May 2013. Archived 1 May 2013 at the Wayback Machine
- Bukovsky, Vladimir [Владимир Буковский] (1996). Московский процесс [Judgment in Moscow] (in Russian). Paris—Moscow: Издательство "Русская мысль—МИК" ["Russian Thought—MIK" Publishing house]. ISBN 5-87902-071-1. Archived from the original on 3 November 2013.
- Bukovsky, Vladimir (1998). Reckoning With Moscow: A Nuremberg Trial for Soviet Agents and Western Fellow Travelers. Regnery Publishing. ISBN 0-89526-389-0.
- Buyanov, Mikhail [Михаил Буянов] (1993). Тяжёлые люди [Difficult people] (in Russian). Moscow: Российское общество медиков-литераторов [Russian Society of Medics and Writers].
- Caute, David (2005). The dancer defects: the struggle for cultural supremacy during the Cold War. Oxford University Press. ISBN 0-19-927883-0.
- Dmitrieva, Tatyana [Татьяна Дмитриева] (2002). Законодательство Российской Федерации в области психиатрии. Комментарий к закону РФ о психиатрической помощи и гарантиях прав граждан при ее оказании, ГК РФ и УК РФ (в части, касающейся лиц с психическими расстройствами) [The legislation of the Russian Federation in the field of psychiatry. Commentary on the Law of the Russian Federation on Mental Health Care and Guarantees of Citizens' Rights during Its Provision, on the Civil Code and the Criminal Code of the Russian Federation (with regard to people with mental disorders)] (PDF) (in Russian). Mоscow: Спарк [Spark]. ISBN 5-88914-187-2. Archived from the original (PDF) on 2 November 2013.
- Dmitrieva, Tatyana; Krasnov, Valery; Neznanov, Nikolai; Semke, Valentin; iganov, Alexander [Татьяна Дмитриева, Валерий Краснов, Николай Незнанов, Валентин Семке, Александр Тиганов], eds. (2012). Психиатрия: Национальное руководство [Psychiatry: National manual] (in Russian). Moscow: ГЭОТАР-Медиа [GEOTAR-Media]. ISBN 978-5970420300.
- Dudley, Michael; Silove, Derrick; Gale, Fran (2012). Mental Health and Human Rights: Vision, praxis, and courage. Oxford University Press. ISBN 978-0-19-921396-2.
- Fedor, Julie (2011). Russia and the Cult of State Security: The Chekist Tradition, From Lenin to Putin. Routledge. ISBN 978-1-136-67186-9.
- Fernando, Suman (2003). Cultural diversity, mental health and psychiatry: The struggle against racism. Psychology Press. ISBN 1-58391-253-3.
- Grigorenko, Pyotr [Пётр Григоренко] (1981). В подполье можно встретить только крыс... [In the underground one can meet only rats...] (in Russian). Нью-Йорк [New York]: Детинец [Detinets].
- Grigorenko, Pyotr (1982). Memoirs. New York: Norton. ISBN 0-393-01570-X.
- Grigorenko, Elena; Ruzgis, Patricia; Sternberg, Robert (1997). Psychology of Russia: past, present, future. Nova Publishers. ISBN 1-56072-389-0.
- Helmchen, Hanfried; Sartorius, Norman (2010). Ethics in Psychiatry: European Contributions. Springer. ISBN 978-90-481-8720-1.
- Jena, S.P.K. (2008). Behaviour Therapy: Techniques, Research and Applications. Sage Publications. ISBN 978-0-7619-3624-4.
- Knapp, Martin (2007). Mental health policy and practice across Europe: the future direction of mental health care. McGraw-Hill International. ISBN 978-0-335-21467-9.
- Kondratev, Fedor [Фёдор Кондратьев] (2010). Судьбы больных шизофренией: клинико-социальный и судебно-психиатрический аспекты [The fates of the ill with schizophrenia: clinico-social and forensico-psychiatric aspects] (PDF) (in Russian). Moscow: ЗАО Юстицинформ [Closed joint-stock company Justitsinform]. Archived (PDF) from the original on 1 February 2014. The ISBN printed in the document (978-5-9977-0014-9) is bad; it causes a checksum error.
- Korolenko, Caesar; Dmitrieva, Nina [Цезарь Короленко, Нина Дмитриева] (2000). Социодинамическая психиатрия [Sociodynamic Psychiatry] (in Russian). Moscow: Академический проект [Academic Project]. ISBN 5829100150.
- Korotenko, Ada; Alikina, Natalia [Ада Коротенко, Наталия Аликина] (2002). Советская психиатрия: Заблуждения и умысел [Soviet psychiatry: fallacies and wilfulness] (in Russian). Kyiv: Издательство "Сфера" [Publishing house "Sphere"]. ISBN 966-7841-36-7.
- Kupriyanov, Nikolai [Николай Куприянов] (2001). ГУЛАГ–2–СН [GULAG–2–SN] (in Russian). St Petersburg: Вертикаль, АБРИС [Vertical, ABRIS]. ISBN 5-85333-051-9.
- Luneyev, Viktor [Виктор Лунеев] (2005). Преступность XX века: Мировые, региональные и российские тенденции [20th century criminality: Worldwide, regional and Russian trends] (in Russian). Wolters Kluwer Russia. ISBN 5-466-00098-1.
- Malterud, Kirsti; Hunskaar, Steinar (2002). Chronic myofascial pain: a patient-centered approach. Radcliffe Publishing. ISBN 1-85775-947-8.
- Marsh, Rosalind (1986). Soviet fiction since Stalin: science, politics and literature. Croom Helm. ISBN 0-7099-1776-7.
- Matvejević, Predrag (2004). Between exile and asylum: an eastern epistolary. Central European University Press. ISBN 963-9241-85-7.
- Nikolaev, Evgeny (1983). Gehirnwäsche in Moskau [Brainwashing in Moscow] (in German). Munich: Klaus Schulz Verlag. ISBN 3-8162-0501-1.
- Nikolaev, Evgeny [Евгений Николаев] (1984). Предавшие Гиппократа [The betrayal of Hippocrates] (in Russian). London: Overseas Publications Interchange Ltd. ISBN 0-903868-81-4.
- Novodvorskaya, Valeriya [Валерия Новодворская] (1993). По ту сторону отчаяния [Beyond Despair] (in Russian). Moscow: Издательство "Новости" [Publishing house "News"].
- Nuller, Yuri [Юрий Нуллер] (2008). Структура психических расстройств [The Structure of Mental Disorders] (PDF) (in Russian). Kyiv: Сфера [Sphere]. pp. 17–18. ISBN 978-966-8782-44-2. Archived (PDF) from the original on 22 February 2014.
- Pietikäinen, Petteri (2015). Madness: A History. Routledge. ISBN 978-1-317-48444-8.
- Plyushch, Leonid [Леонид Плющ] (1979a). На карнавале истории [At history's carnival] (in Russian). London: Overseas Publications Interchange.
- Plyushch, Leonid (1979b). History's carnival: a dissident's autobiography. Collins and Harvill Press. ISBN 0-00-262116-9.
- Podrabinek, Alexander [Александр Подрабинек] (1979). Карательная медицина [Punitive medicine] (PDF) (in Russian). New York: Издательство "Хроника" [Khronika Press]. Archived from the original on 22 June 2016.
- Podrabinek, Alexander (1980). Punitive medicine. Karoma Publishers. ISBN 0-89720-022-5.
- Prokopenko, Anatoly [Анатолий Прокопенко] (1997). Безумная психиатрия: секретные материалы о применении в СССР психиатрии в карательных целях [Mad psychiatry: classified materials on the use of psychiatry in the USSR for punitive purposes] (in Russian). Moscow: "Совершенно секретно" ["Top Secret"]. ISBN 5-85275-145-6. Archived from the original on 4 February 2014. Archived 4 February 2014 at the Wayback Machine "MFF Свобода Слова » БЕЗУМНАЯ ПСИХИАТРИЯ". Archived from the original on 4 February 2014.
- Pshizov, Vladimir [Владимир Пшизов] (2002). Синдром замкнутого пространства (Записки судебного психиатра) [Syndrome of closed space (The forensic psychiatrist's notes)] (in Russian). St Petersburg. ISBN 9785724302425.
- Regier, Darrel (2011). The Conceptual Evolution of DSM-5. American Psychiatric Pub. ISBN 978-1-58562-388-4.
- Rhoer, Edward Van Der (1983). The shadow network. Scribner. ISBN 0-684-17960-1.
- Robertson, Michael; Walter, Garry (2013). Ethics and Mental Health: The Patient, Profession and Community. CRC Press. ISBN 978-1-4441-6864-8.
- Serov, Anatoly [Анатолий Серов] (2003). Моя судьба и моя борьба против психиатров [My destiny and my struggle against psychiatrists] (in Russian). Moscow: Экслибрис-Пресс [Ex libris-Press]. ISBN 5-88161-128-4.
- Shatravka, Alexandr [Александр Шатравка] (2010). Побег из рая [Escape from paradise] (in Russian). New York: Liberty Publishing House. ISBN 978-1-932686-62-3.
- Stone, Alan (1985). Law, Psychiatry, and Morality: Essays and Analysis. American Psychiatric Pub. ISBN 0-88048-209-5.
- Szasz, Thomas (1998). Cruel compassion: Psychiatric control of society's unwanted. Syracuse University Press. ISBN 0-8156-0510-2.
- Tarsis, Valeriĭ (1965). Ward 7: an autobiographical novel. Dutton.
- Thomas, Craig (1983). Firefox Down. New York: Bantam Books. ISBN 0-553-17095-3.
- Vasilenko, N.Y. [Н.Ю. Василенко] (2004). Основы социальной медицины [Fundamentals of social medicine] (in Russian). Vladivostok: Издательство Дальневосточного университета [Publishing house of Far Eastern Federal University].
- Veenhoven, Willem; Ewing, Winifred; Samenlevingen, Stichting (1975). Case studies on human rights and fundamental freedoms: a world survey. Vol. 1. Martinus Nijhoff Publishers. ISBN 90-247-1780-9.
- Vetokhin, Yuri [Юрий Ветохин] (1983). Склонен к побегу [Inclined to Escape] (in Russian). Author's edition.
- Vetokhin, Yuri (1986). Inclined to Escape. Author's edition.
- Voren, Robert van (1987). Koryagin: a man struggling for human dignity. Second World Press. ISBN 90-71271-07-2.
- Voren, Robert van (2009a). On dissidents and madness: From the Soviet Union of Leonid Brezhnev to the "Soviet Union" of Vladimir Putin. Amsterdam & New York: Rodopi Publishers. ISBN 978-90-420-2585-1.
- Voren, Robert van (2010b). Cold war in psychiatry: human factors, secret actors. Amsterdam & New York: Rodopi Publishers. ISBN 978-90-420-3048-0.
- Voren, Robert van (2013a). Psychiatry as a tool of coercion in post-Soviet countries (PDF). The European Parliament. doi:10.2861/28281. ISBN 978-92-823-4595-5. Russian text: Voren, Robert van [Роберт ван Ворен] (2013). "Психиатрия как средство репрессий в советских и постсоветских странах" [Psychiatry as a tool of coercion in post-Soviet countries]. Вестник Ассоциации психиатров Украины [The Herald of the Ukrainian Psychiatric Association] (in Russian) (5). The Ukrainian Psychiatric Association.

Journal articles and book chapters

- "15 лет Независимому психиатрическому журналу" [15th anniversary of the Independent Psychiatric Journal]. Nezavisimiy Psikhiatricheskiy Zhurnal [The Independent Psychiatric Journal] (in Russian) (4). 2005. ISSN 1028-8554.
- "Выступления П.Д. Тищенко, Б.Г. Юдина, А.И. Антонова, А.Г. Гофмана, В.Н. Краснова, Б.А. Воскресенского" [Speeches by P.D. Tishchenko, B.G. Yudin, A.I. Antonov, A.G. Gofman, V.N. Krasnov, B.A. Voskresensky]. Nezavisimiy Psikhiatricheskiy Zhurnal [The Independent Psychiatric Journal] (in Russian) (2). 2004. ISSN 1028-8554.
- "Проблема социальной опасности психически больных" [The problem of the social danger of the mentally ill]. Nezavisimiy Psikhiatricheskiy Zhurnal [The Independent Psychiatric Journal] (in Russian) (4): 12–17. 2007b.
- Abovin-Yegides, Pyotr [Пётр Абовин-Егидес] (1982). "Паралогизмы полицейской психиатрии и их соотношение с медицинской этикой" [Paralogisms of police psychiatry and their relation to medical ethics]. Поиски [Quests] (in Russian) (4): 221–248. Archived from the original on 3 July 2020.
- Adler, Nanci; Gluzman, Semyon [Нэнси Адлер, Семён Глузман] (1992). "Пытка психиатрией. Механизм и последствия" [Torture by psychiatry. Mechanism and consequences]. Обозрение психиатрии и медицинской психологии имени В.М. Бехтерева (in Russian) (3): 138–152. ISSN 0762-7475.
- Bernstein, Norman (21 November 1980). "Punitive Medicine". The Journal of the American Medical Association. 244 (20): 2354. doi:10.1001/jama.1980.03310200078038.
- Bloch, Sidney (June 1980). "The political misuse of Soviet psychiatry: Honolulu and beyond" (PDF). Australian and New Zealand Journal of Psychiatry. 14 (2): 109–114. doi:10.3109/00048678009159364. PMID 6107077.
- Bloch, Sidney (April 1997). "Psychiatry: An Impossible Profession?". Australian and New Zealand Journal of Psychiatry. 31 (2): 172–183. doi:10.3109/00048679709073818. PMID 9140623.
- Chodoff, Paul (September 1985). "Ethical conflicts in psychiatry: the Soviet Union vs. the U.S.". Hospital and Community Psychiatry. 36 (9): 925–928. doi:10.1176/ps.36.9.925. PMID 4065851.
- Dmitriev, Dmitry [Дмитрий Дмитриев] (2002). "Книжная полка Дмитрия Дмитриева" [The bookshelf of Dmitry Dmitriev]. Novy Mir (in Russian) (7).
- Gluzman, Semyon [Семён Глузман] (2013a). "История психиатрических репрессий" [The history of psychiatric repression]. Вестник Ассоциации психиатров Украины [The Herald of the Ukrainian Psychiatric Association] (in Russian) (2). The Ukrainian Psychiatric Association.
- Gluzman, Semyon (December 1991). "Abuse of psychiatry: analysis of the guilt of medical personnel". Journal of Medical Ethics. 17 (Supplement): 19–20. doi:10.1136/jme.17.Suppl.19. PMC 1378165. PMID 1795363.
- Gluzman, Semyon [Семён Глузман] (2009a). "Украинское лицо судебной психиатрии" [The Ukrainian face of forensic psychiatry]. Новости медицины и фармации [Medicine and Pharmacy News] (in Russian). 15 (289). Издательский дом "Заславский" ["Zaslavsky" Publishing House].
- Gluzman, Semyon [Семён Глузман] (2009b). "Этиология психиатрических злоупотреблений: попытка мультидисциплинарного анализа" [The etiology of psychiatric abuses: an attempt at multidisciplinary analysis]. Новости медицины и фармации [Medicine and Pharmacy News] (in Russian). 20 (300): 18–19.
- Gluzman, Semyon [Семён Глузман] (January 2010a). "Этиология злоупотреблений в психиатрии: попытка мультидисциплинарного анализа" [The etiology of abuses in psychiatry: an attempt at multidisciplinary analysis]. Нейроnews: Психоневрология и нейропсихиатрия [Neuronews: Psychoneurology and Neuropsychiatry] (in Russian). 1 (20). Archived from the original on 17 November 2015.
- Gostin, Larry (September 1986). "Soviet Psychiatric Abuse: the Shadow Over World Psychiatry". Journal of Medical Ethics. 12 (3): 161–162. doi:10.1136/jme.12.3.161-a. PMC 1375367.
- Grigorenko, Pyotr [Пётр Григоренко] (1970a). "О специальных психиатрических больницах (дурдомах)" [On special psychiatric hospitals ("madhouses")]. In Gorbanevskaya, Natalia [Наталья Горбаневская] (ed.). Полдень: Дело о демонстрации 25 августа 1968 года на Красной площади [Noon: The case on the demonstration of 25 August 1968 at the Red Square] (in Russian). Frankfurt-on-Main: Посев [Seeding]. pp. 461–473.
- Grigorenko, Pyotr (1970b). "On special psychiatric hospitals ("madhouses")". In Gorbanevskaya, Natalia (ed.). Red Square at Noon. Holt, Rinehart and Winston. ISBN 0-03-085990-5.
- Gushansky, Emmanuil [Эммауил Гушанский] (2005). "Предисловие к книге Анатолия Прокопенко "Безумная психиатрия"" [Preface to the book by Anatoly Prokopenko Mad Psychiatry]. In Taras, Anatoly [Анатолий Tapac] (ed.). Карательная психиатрия [Punitive psychiatry] (in Russian). Moscow & Minsk: АСТ, Харвест [AST, Harvest]. pp. 33–34. ISBN 5170301723.
- Gushansky, Emmanuil [Эммануил Гушанский] (1999). "Нужны ли правозащитники в психиатрии?" [Are human rights activists needed in psychiatry?]. Российский бюллетень по правам человека [Russian Bulletin on Human Rights] (in Russian) (13). Moscow: Изд-во Института прав человека [Publishing House of the Human Rights Institute]. Archived from the original on 19 January 2013.
- Gushansky, Emmanuil [Эммануил Гушанский] (2010a). "Нужны ли правозащитники в психиатрии?" [Are human rights activists needed in psychiatry?] (PDF). Адвокатская палата [Advocatory chamber] (in Russian) (8). Moscow: Адвокатская палата Московской области [The Advocatory chamber of the Moscow oblast]: 23–25.
- Gushansky, Emmanuil (Эммануил Гушанский) (2000). "Субъективная картина болезни и гуманистические проблемы в психиатрии" [Subjective picture of disease and humanistic issues in psychiatry]. Человек (Man) (in Russian) (2): 112–119.
- Healey, Dan (June 2011). "Book Review: Robert van Voren, Cold War in Psychiatry". History of Psychiatry. 22 (2): 246–247. doi:10.1177/0957154X110220020802.
- Healey, Dan (January–February 2014). "Russian and Soviet forensic psychiatry: Troubled and troubling". International Journal of Law and Psychiatry. 37 (1): 71–81. doi:10.1016/j.ijlp.2013.09.007. PMID 24128434.
- Keukens, Rob; Voren, Robert van (2007). "Coercion in psychiatry: still an instrument of political misuse?". BMC Psychiatry. 7(Suppl 1) (Suppl 1): S4. doi:10.1186/1471-244X-7-S1-S4. PMC 3332857.
- Koryagin, Anatoliy (July 1990). "Compulsion in psychiatry: blessing or curse?". The Psychiatrist. 14 (7): 394–398. doi:10.1192/pb.14.7.394.
- Kovalyov, Andrei [Андрей Ковалёв] (2007). "Взгляд очевидца на предысторию принятия закона о психиатрической помощи" [View of the eyewitness to the backstory of the adoption of the Mental Health Law]. Nezavisimiy Psikhiatricheskiy Zhurnal [The Independent Psychiatric Journal] (in Russian) (3): 82–90.
- Krasnov, Valery; Gurovich, Isaak (August 2012). "History and current condition of Russian psychiatry". International Review of Psychiatry. 24 (4): 328–333. doi:10.3109/09540261.2012.694857. PMID 22950772.
- Kupriyanov, Nikolay [Николай Куприянов] (2005). "ГУЛАГ-2-СН" [GULAG-2-SN]. In Taras, Anatoly [Анатолий Tapac] (ed.). Карательная психиатрия [Punitive psychiatry] (in Russian). Moscow & Minsk: АСТ, Харвест [AST, Harvest]. pp. 205–577. ISBN 5170301723.
- Lapshin, Oleg [Олег Лапшин] (2003). "Недобровольная госпитализация психически больных в законодательстве России и Соединенных Штатов" [Involuntary hospitalization of mental patients in the legislation of Russia and the United States]. Nezavisimiy Psikhiatricheskiy Zhurnal [The Independent Psychiatric Journal] (in Russian) (4).
- Lavretsky, Helen (1998). "The Russian Concept of Schizophrenia: A Review of the Literature" (PDF). Schizophrenia Bulletin. 24 (4): 537–557. doi:10.1093/oxfordjournals.schbul.a033348. PMID 9853788. Archived from the original (PDF) on 29 July 2014.
- Leontev, Dmitry [Дмитрий Леонтьев] (16 April 2010). "Расширить границы нормального" [Broadening the boundaries of normality]. Psychologies (in Russian) (47).
- Luty, Jason (January 2014). "Psychiatry and the dark side: eugenics, Nazi and Soviet psychiatry". Advances in Psychiatric Treatment. 20 (1): 52–60. doi:10.1192/apt.bp.112.010330.
- Lyons, Declan; O'Malley, Art (December 2002). "The labelling of dissent — politics and psychiatry behind the Great Wall". The Psychiatrist. 26 (12): 443–444. doi:10.1192/pb.26.12.443.
- Munro, Robin (2002b). "On the Psychiatric Abuse of Falun Gong and Other Dissenters in China: A Reply to Stone, Hickling, Kleinman, and Lee" (PDF). The Journal of the American Academy of Psychiatry and the Law. 30 (2): 266–274. PMID 12108564.
- Murray, Thomas (June 1983). "Genetic screening in the workplace: ethical issues". Journal of Occupational and Environmental Medicine. 25 (6): 451–454. doi:10.1097/00043764-198306000-00009. PMID 6886846.
- Ougrin, Dennis; Gluzman, Semyon; Dratcu, Luiz (November 2006). "Psychiatry in post-communist Ukraine: dismantling the past, paving the way for the future". The Psychiatrist. 30 (12): 456–459. doi:10.1192/pb.30.12.456.
- Pashkovsky, Vladimir [Владимир Пашковский] (2012). "О клиническом значении религиозно-архаического бредового комплекса" [The clinical meaning of religious-archaic delusions]. Социальная и клиническая психиатрия [Social and Clinical Psychiatry] (in Russian). 22 (2): 43–48.
- Pasko, Grigori [Григорий Пасько] (2007). "Шизофрения, или Будьте здоровы!" [Schizophrenia, or To your health!]. Index on Censorship (in Russian) (27).
- Pozharov, Alexei [Алексей Пожаров] (1999). "КГБ и партия" [The KGB and the Party]. Отечественная История (in Russian) (4): 169–174.
- Prokopenko, Anatoly [Анатолий Прокопенко] (2005). "Безумная психиатрия" [Mad psychiatry]. In Taras, Anatoly [Анатолий Tapac] (ed.). Карательная психиатрия [Punitive psychiatry] (in Russian). Moscow & Minsk: АСТ, Харвест [AST, Harvest]. p. 187. ISBN 5170301723.
- Pshizov, Vladimir [Владимир Пшизов] (2006). "Психиатрия тронулась?" [Has psychiatry moved on?]. Альманах "Неволя" ["Bondage" Almanac] (in Russian) (6): 72–85. Archived from the original on 26 December 2012.
- Rafalsky, Viktor [Виктор Рафальский] (1995). "Репортаж из ниоткуда" [Reportage from nowhere]. Воля: журнал узников тоталитарных систем [Unconstraint: the journal of prisoners of totalitarian systems] (in Russian) (4–5): 162–181. Archived from the original on 25 February 2020.
- Sagan, Leonard; Jonsen, Albert (June 1976). "Medical Ethics and Torture". The New England Journal of Medicine. 294 (26): 1427–1430. doi:10.1056/NEJM197606242942605. PMID 944852.
- Sartorius, Norman (2010). "Revision of the classification of mental disorders in ICD-11 and DSM-V: work in progress". Advances in Psychiatric Treatment. 16: 2–9. doi:10.1192/apt.bp.109.007138.
- Savenko, Yuri [Юрий Савенко] (2005a). "Карательная психиатрия в России (рецензия)" [Punitive psychiatry in Russia (review)]. Nezavisimiy Psikhiatricheskiy Zhurnal [The Independent Psychiatric Journal] (in Russian) (1). ISSN 1028-8554.
- Savenko, Yuri [Юрий Савенко] (2005b). ""Институт дураков" Виктора Некипелова" [Institute of fools by Viktor Nekipelov]. Nezavisimiy Psikhiatricheskiy Zhurnal [The Independent Psychiatric Journal] (in Russian) (4). ISSN 1028-8554.
- Savenko, Yuri [Юрий Савенко] (2007a). "Апология полицейской психиатрии" [Apology of police psychiatry]. Nezavisimiy Psikhiatricheskiy Zhurnal [The Independent Psychiatric Journal] (in Russian) (4). ISSN 1028-8554.
- Savenko, Yuri [Юрий Савенко] (2012). "Синдром Еникеевой" [Enikeyeva's syndrome]. Nezavisimiy Psikhiatricheskiy Zhurnal [The Independent Psychiatric Journal] (in Russian) (4): 84. ISSN 1028-8554.
- Stone, Alan (2002). "Psychiatrists on the side of the angels: the Falun Gong and Soviet Jewry" (PDF). The Journal of the American Academy of Psychiatry and the Law. 30 (1): 107–111. PMID 11931357. Archived from the original (PDF) on 28 September 2011.
- Tarasov, Alexander [Александр Тарасов] (2006). "Психиатрия: контроль над сознанием или тем, что от него осталось" [Psychiatry: the control over consciousness or what is left of it]. Альманах "Неволя" ["Bondage" Almanac] (in Russian) (9): 154–159. Archived from the original on 7 February 2009.
- Voren, Robert van [Роберт ван Ворен] (2013c). "Отзыв на статью об Институте Сербского" [The response to an article on the Serbsky Institute]. Вестник Ассоциации психиатров Украины [The Herald of the Ukrainian Psychiatric Association] (in Russian) (5). The Ukrainian Psychiatric Association.
- Voren, Robert van (January 2010a). "Political Abuse of Psychiatry—An Historical Overview". Schizophrenia Bulletin. 36 (1): 33–35. doi:10.1093/schbul/sbp119. PMC 2800147. PMID 19892821.

Newspapers

- "Soviets to trim list of 'mental patients': End of abuses would mean reclassifying 2 million people". The Arizona Republic. 12 February 1988.
- Asriyants, Sergei [Cергей Асриянц] (24 April 2009). "24 апреля – Юрий Савенко и Любовь Виноградова (онлайн конференции)" [24 April–Yuri Savenko and Lyubov Vinogradova (online conferences)]. Novaya Gazeta (in Russian). Archived from the original on 2 December 2013.
- Billington, Michael (19 January 2009). "Every Good Boy Deserves Favour". The Guardian.
- Blomfield, Adrian (13 August 2007). "Asylums used as 'tools of repression'". The Daily Telegraph.
- Davidoff, Victor (13 October 2013). "Soviet Psychiatry Returns". The Moscow Times. Archived from the original on 7 March 2023.
- Franks, Alan (22 December 2008). "Tom Stoppard and Andre Previn on Every Good Boy Deserves Favour". The Times. Archived from the original on 5 September 2011.
- Glasser, Susan (15 December 2002). "Psychiatry's Painful Past Resurfaces in Russian Case; Handling of Chechen Murder Reminds Many of Soviet Political Abuse of Mental Health System". The Washington Post. Archived from the original on 5 November 2012. Russian text: Glasser, Susan [Сьюзен Глассер] (15 December 2002). "Болезненное прошлое российской психиатрии вновь всплыло в судебном деле Буданова" [Psychiatry's Painful Past Resurfaces in Russian Case; Handling of Chechen Murder Reminds Many of Soviet Political Abuse of Mental Health System]. The Washington Post (in Russian). inoSMI.
- Reich, Walter (30 January 1983). "The world of Soviet psychiatry". The New York Times. Russian text: Reich, Walter [Уолтер Рейч]. "Мир советской психиатрии" [The world of Soviet psychiatry]. The New York Times (in Russian). Archived from the original on 19 January 2012.
- Schodolski, Vincent (28 February 1989). "Soviet Psychiatric Practices Inspected by U.S. Delegation". Chicago Tribune.
- Smulevich, Anatoly; Morozov, Pyotr [Анатолий Смулевич, Пётр Морозов] (2014). "Психиатрию нельзя выдумать из головы или из учебников" [Psychiatry cannot be invented in mind or textbooks] (PDF). Дневник психиатра [The Psychiatrist's Diary] (in Russian). No. 1. pp. 1–4. Archived (PDF) from the original on 28 April 2014.
- Sokolov, Maxim [Максим Соколов] (5 October 2007). "Путин абсолютен" [Putin is absolute]. Izvestia (in Russian).
- Spencer, Charles (14 January 2010). "Every Good Boy Deserves Favour at the National Theatre, review". The Telegraph.
- Vyzhutovich, Valeri [Валерий Выжутович] (3 November 2011). "Когда болит душа" [When the soul hurts]. Rossiyskaya Gazeta [Russian Newspaper] (in Russian). p. Week number 5624 (248).

Websites

- "Every Good Boy Deserves Favour by Tom Stoppard". The Complete Review. 2009.
- "Every good boy deserves favour". National Theatre of Great Britain. January 2010. Archived from the original on 20 March 2012.
- Agamirov, Karen [Карэн Агамиров] (25 January 2005). "Человек имеет право. Карательная психиатрия: постигнет ли Китай участь Советского Союза, исключенного в 1983 году из членов Всемирной Ассоциации психиатров, и подтягивается ли к ним Россия?" [Man has the right. Punitive psychiatry: will China suffer the same fate as the Soviet Union expelled from members of the World Psychiatric Association in 1983, and is Russia moving closer up to them?]. Радио Свобода (in Russian). Radio Liberty.
- Agamirov, Karen [Карэн Агамиров] (17 July 2007). "Человек имеет право. Право на защиту от карательной психиатрии" [Man has the right. The right to defence against punitive psychiatry]. Радио Свобода (in Russian). Radio Liberty.
- Baburin, Vladimir [Владимир Бабурин] (10 August 2004). "Человек имеет право. Выставка "Разрушенные жизни. Разоблачения психиатрии"" [Man has the right. The exhibition "Destroyed lives. Psychiatry exposed."]. Радио Свобода (in Russian). Radio Liberty.
- Demina, Nataliya [Наталия Демина] (15 January 2008). "Круг лиц, которые пытаются "купить" эксперта, очень широк" [The circle of persons who try to bribe an expert is very broad] (in Russian). Polit.ru.
- Fedenko, Pavel [Павел Феденко] (9 October 2009). "Был бы человек, а диагноз найдется" [A diagnosis is quickly found to attribute a person with]. The BBC Russian Service.
- Peters, Irina [Ирина Петерс] (28 March 2014). "В Литве живут с верой в НАТО" [Lithuania lives, trusting in NATO]. Радио Свобода (in Russian). Radio Liberty.
- Schultz, Frederick (2011). "Andropov and the U.S. media: a comparative study of Yuri Andropov's premiership of the USSR as viewed through the New York Times and the Chicago Tribune. In: Theses and Dissertations. Paper 710.". The University of Toledo Digital Repository. Archived from the original on 1 July 2015.
