= Vladimir Serbsky =

Russian psychiatrist (1858–1917)

- Владимир Петрович Сербский
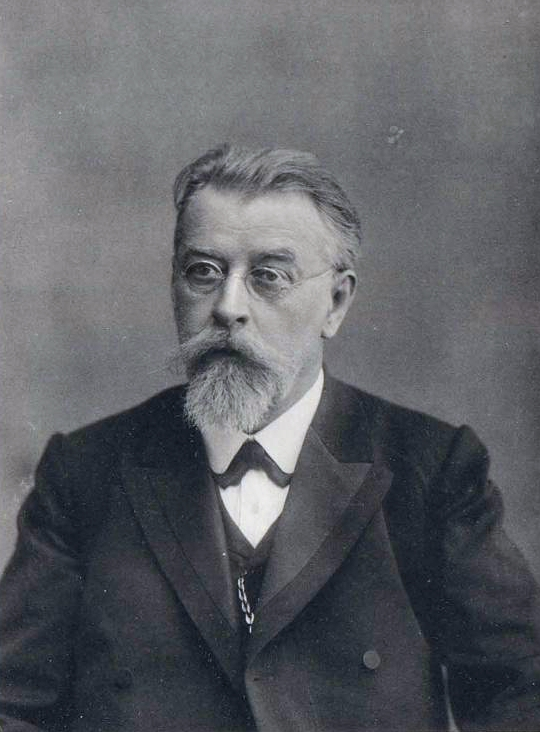
- Born: 26 February 1858; Bogorodsk, Russian Empire
- Died: 18 April 1917 (aged 59)
- Citizenship: Russia
- Education: Imperial Moscow University
- Medical career
- Profession: Psychiatrist
- Research: Forensic psychiatry

Vladimir Petrovich Serbsky (Russian: Влади́мир Петро́вич Се́рбский, 26 February [O.S. 14 February] 1858 in Bogorodsk – 18 April [O.S. 5 April] 1917 in Moscow) was a Russian psychiatrist and one of the founders of forensic psychiatry in Russia. The author of The Forensic Psychopathology, Serbsky thought delinquency to have no congenital basis, considering it to be caused by social reasons.

The Central Institute of Forensic Psychiatry was named after Serbsky in 1921. Now the facility is known as the Serbsky Center (Serbsky State Scientific Center for Social and Forensic Psychiatry).

== Biography ==
Vladimir Petrovich Serbsky was born in 1858 in Bogorodsk (now Noginsk, Moscow Region) in the family of a zemstvo doctor.

After Serbsky grew up, his family moved to Moscow, where he studied at the Second Moscow Gymnasium. After graduation he entered the Physics and Mathematics Department of Moscow University, graduating in 1880 with a candidate's degree. In the same year, he entered the Medical Department of Moscow University. Since he already had a higher education, he was immediately placed into the third year. Serbsky was fascinated by the study of nervous and mental diseases and became one of the students of SS Korsakov. In 1883 Serbsky defended his thesis on "The clinical importance of albuminuria", for which he received a silver medal.

After graduating from the medical department, Serbsky began medical work under the direction of S. S. Korsakov in the private psychiatric hospital M. F. Bekker. In 1885, Vladimir Petrovich Serbsky was offered to manage a zemstvo psychiatric clinic in the Tambov province; he accepted the offer, leading the clinic until 1887. The local zemstvo offered him a trip to Austria, where he worked for almost a year at the Vienna Psychiatric Clinic under the direction of T. Meinert.

After returning from Austria, Serbsky worked for several months in the Tambov Clinic for the mentally ill, and then returned to Moscow, where he was elected to the position of senior assistant of the Moscow University psychiatric clinic. In 1891, Serbsky defended his thesis, "Forms of mental disorders described under the name of catatonia" for the degree of Doctor of Medicine and in 1892 received the title of privat-docent.

After the death of S. S. Korsakov, Serbsky in actuality became the chief psychiatrist in Russia. In 1902 he was appointed extraordinary professor and director of the psychiatric clinic, and in 1903 he headed the Department of Psychiatry of Moscow University, which he directed until 1911.

In 1905, Serbsky made a report in which he showed that the situation created in the country promotes the growth of mental illnesses. After the congress, he published a book in which he considered the role of revolution as a factor influencing the change in the consciousness of a large number of people. Such a position had a negative effect on his relations with the authorities. In 1911, as a sign of protest against the reactionary policy of the Minister of Education L. A. Kasso, Serbsky resigned and in the same year at the First Congress of Russian Psychiatrists and Neuropathologists he spoke against the government's policy of suppressing rights and freedoms that resulted in the closing of the congress.

In 1913, the English and Scottish societies of psychiatrists elected the scientist their honorary member and were invited to visit Britain. Serbsky accepted the invitation. He was accepted as a famous scientist and public figure. He gave lectures, visited clinics, and advised patients. The University of Edinburgh offered him the position of a professor. He declined it and returned to Russia.

In 1913 Serbsky publicly denounced unsound examination of government-inspired anti-Semitic case M. Bayliss, who was unjustly accused of murdering a boy for ritual purposes.

After the Provisional Government came to power, the new Minister of Education, A. A. Manuilov, sent a letter to Serbsky, in which he invited him to return to Moscow University. The letter came too late, the scientist was already terminally ill. Vladimir Petrovich lived out his last days in poverty, since he retired without earning his pension. Renal failure due to chronic nephritis was gradually aggravated, and on March 23, 1917, Serbsky died. He was buried at the Novodevichy Cemetery.

== Scientific activity ==
Under the supervision of Serbsky, the Tambov hospital became one of the most advanced institutions of its type in Russia. Straight jackets and leather sleeves were banned in the patients clinic. There was a widespread use of work and entertainment for patients and the main contingent of workers who took part in walks and other festivities consisted of chronic patients.

Serbsky always advocated that patients were treated primarily as people. He repeatedly engaged in arguments with psychiatrist E. Krepelin, who fell back on a formalized diagnosis of mental illness. Considering the big picture of the disease, Serbsky took into account not only mental, but also physical ailments of patients, trying to recreate a picture of their relationships.

Serbsky was the first teacher at Moscow University in 1892 who lectured on forensic psychiatry to students of the law and medical departments.

Serbsky worked on issues of diagnosing the main forms of psychosis. He was the first one to find that some of the painful manifestations observed in adult patients are consequences of their childhood intellectual disorders. Gradually, Serbsky formulated the basic principles of the methodology by which psychiatrists could now determine the degree of the patient's sanity, that is, the ability to critically evaluate his actions.

Serbsky supported and developed A. W. Freze's and V. X. Kandinsky's positions on the significance of the psychological understanding of mental disorders for the correct solution to forensic psychiatric questions. He pointed to the merits of V. X. Kandinsky: "V. X. Kandinsky developed the need to establish the psychological criterion of insanity by law with the greatest conviction- I can only align myself with the views of this talented psychologist."

Serbsky first proved the inconsistency of K. Kalbaums's doctrine of catatonia as an independent disease. In 1890 Serbsky found that the catatonic symptom complex can be a consequence of schizophrenia and other psychoses.

In 1895, Serbsky released the first volume of "The Guide to Forensic Psychopathology," devoted to general theoretical questions and legislation on forensic psychiatry. This covered issues of forensic psychiatric theory and practice, as well as legislation for mental patients. The second volume of the "Guide" was published in 1900. For many decades the book was the desk guide for psychiatrists around the world. In this book, for the first time in the history of science, a description of various forms of malignant schizophrenia was presented. Serbsky succeeded in showing that an accurate diagnosis can be made only on the basis of a comprehensive examination of the patient.

Serbsky proved that from the point of view of psychiatry even a dangerous criminal can be a sick person. In this case, he should be isolated from society and be allowed to heal. The scientist was deeply convinced that in many crimes the environment that influenced the formation of his personality is to blame. He suggested introducing mandatory psychiatric examination for those accused of committing serious crimes. Usually in such cases, death sentences were imposed.

In 1912, Serbsky organized and headed the "Moscow Psychiatric Circle of Small Fridays," which became one of the first organizational structures composed and led by psychoanalysts (M. M. Asatiani, E. N. Dovbnya, N. Ye. Osipov, O. B. Feltsman and others). He criticized a number of provisions of Freud's teachings and the works of Russian psychoanalysts, including his students. At the same time encouraged the discussion of psychoanalytic problems. The discussions were carried out from the first day of the work of the circle.

Serbsky developed a modern form of sponsorship for psychiatric patients, was one of the founders of the Journal of Neuropathology and Psychiatry after S. S. Kosakov and the Russian Union of Psychiatrists and Neuropathologists, he was an active participant in all psychiatric and Pirogov congresses, delivering program papers on problems of forensic psychiatry, participated in many psychiatric examinations in cases that caused great public outcry, defending his own-always clinically sound- opinion.

== Scientific works ==
- Serbsky VP Report on the examination of psychiatric institutions in Austria, Switzerland, France, Germany and Russia, submitted to the Tambov Provincial Zemstvo Board. - Tambov, 1886.
- Serbsky VP Report on the state of the hospital for the mentally ill at Tambov Zemsky hospital, 1886.
- Serbsky VP About acute forms of insanity // Medical Review, 1885,? 3.
- Serbsky VP Review of reports on the status of institutions for the mentally ill in Russia for the years 1890-1900 "/ / Medical Review, 1893-1902 gg.
- Serbsky VP On the project of organizing zemstvo care of the mentally ill Moscow provincial zemstvos. - M., 1893.
- Serbsky VP Teaching psychiatry for lawyers / / Collection of Jurisprudence, 1893.
- Serbsky VP On forensic psychiatric examination // Proceedings of the Vth Congress of the Society of Russian Physicians in memory of NI Pirogov.
- Serbsky VP Judicial psychopathology. Volume I. - M., 1895.
- Serbsky VP Judicial psychopathology. Volume II. - M., 1900.
- Serbsky VP On the conditions for placing mentally ill persons who committed crimes in psychiatric hospitals by the definition of the court and their release. International Union of Criminalists. Russian Group / / Journal of the Ministry of Justice, 1901.
- Serbsky VP On the issue of early dementia (Dementia praecox) // Neuropathology and psychiatry them. S. S. Korsakov, 1902.
- Serbsky VP Duration, course and outcome of mental illness, 1906.
- Serbsky VP Recognition of mental illnesses. 1906.
- Serbsky VP A Guide to the Study of Mental Illnesses. - M., 1906.
- Serbsky VP Short therapy of mental illnesses. - M., 1911.
- Serbsky VP Psychiatry. - M., 1912.

== Memory ==
Since 1912 the name of Vladimir Petrovich Serbsky has been carried by the Central Institute of Forensic Psychiatry in Moscow.

== Major works ==
- The Forensic Psychopathology (1896-1900)
- On Dementia praecox (1902)
- Manual of Study of Mental Diseases (1906)
