= Valery Tarsis =

Ukrainian writer critical of communist regime (1906–1983)

Valery Yakovlevich Tarsis
- Валерий Яковлевич Тарсис
- Born: 23 September [O.S. 10 September] 1906; Kyiv, Ukraine
- Died: 3 March 1983 (aged 76); Bern, Switzerland
- Citizenship: Soviet Union
- Education: Rostov-on-Don State University
- Occupations: Specialist in Western literature; translator; writer

Valery Yakovlevich Tarsis (Ukrainian: Валерій Якович Тарсіс, Russian: Вале́рий Я́ковлевич Та́рсис; 23 September [O.S. 10 September] 1906, Kyiv – 3 March 1983, Bern) was a Ukrainian writer, literary critic, and translator. He was highly critical of the communist regime.

== Biography ==
Valery was born in Kyiv in 1906 and graduated from the Rostov-on-Don State University in 1929.

He translated thirty four books into Russian.

During World War II Tarsis was twice severely wounded.

As a young man Tarsis joined the Communist Party of the Soviet Union but became disillusioned in the 1930s and finally broke with the party in 1960. In 1966, he said his key purpose in writing "is to struggle against Communism." He smuggled his compositions out of Russia so that they could escape Soviet censorship.

The publication abroad of his scathing 1962 novel The Bluebottle earned him an eight-month stay in a Soviet mental hospital, an experience he described in his autobiographical novel Ward 7: "All around him were faces exposed by sleep or distorted by nightmares ... it is always hard to be the only one awake, and it is almost unbearable to stand the third watch of the world in a madhouse..."

Tarsis' Ward No. 7 is a personal account of the use of psychiatry to stifle dissidence. The book was one of the first literary works to deal with political abuse of psychiatry in the Soviet Union. Tarsis based the book upon his own experiences in 1963–1964 when he was detained in the Moscow Kashchenko psychiatric hospital for political reasons. In a parallel with the story Ward No. 6 by Anton Chekhov, Tarsis implies that it is the doctors who are mad, whereas the patients are completely sane, although unsuited to a life of slavery. In ward No. 7 individuals are not cured, but persistently maimed; the hospital is a jail and the doctors are gaolers and police spies. Most doctors know nothing about psychiatry, but make diagnoses arbitrarily and give all patients the same medication — the anti-psychotic drug aminozin or an algogenic injection. Tarsis denounces Soviet psychiatry as pseudo-science and charlatanism.

Among all the victims of Soviet psychiatry, Tarsis was the sole exception in the sense that he did not emphasised the 'injustice' of confining 'sane dissidents' to psychiatric hospitals and did not thereby imply that the psychiatric confinement of 'insane patients' was proper and just.

In 1966, Tarsis was permitted to emigrate to the West, and was soon deprived of his Soviet citizenship. He lectured at the Leicester University, Monterey Peninsula College, and Gettysburg College. In his words, he had invitations to lecture at the Sorbonne and at universities of Geneva, Oslo and Naples. The KGB had plans to compromise the literary career of Tarsis abroad through labelling him as a mentally ill person. As the 1966 memorandum to the Politburo of the Central Committee of the Communist Party of the Soviet Union reported, "KGB continues arrangements for further compromising Tarsis abroad as a mentally ill person." He settled in Bern, Switzerland where he died after a heart attack on 3 March 1983 at the age of 76.

== Works ==
- The Bluebottle (1962)
- Ward 7 (1965)
- The Pleasure Factory (1967)
- The Gay life (1968)
