= Serbsky Center =

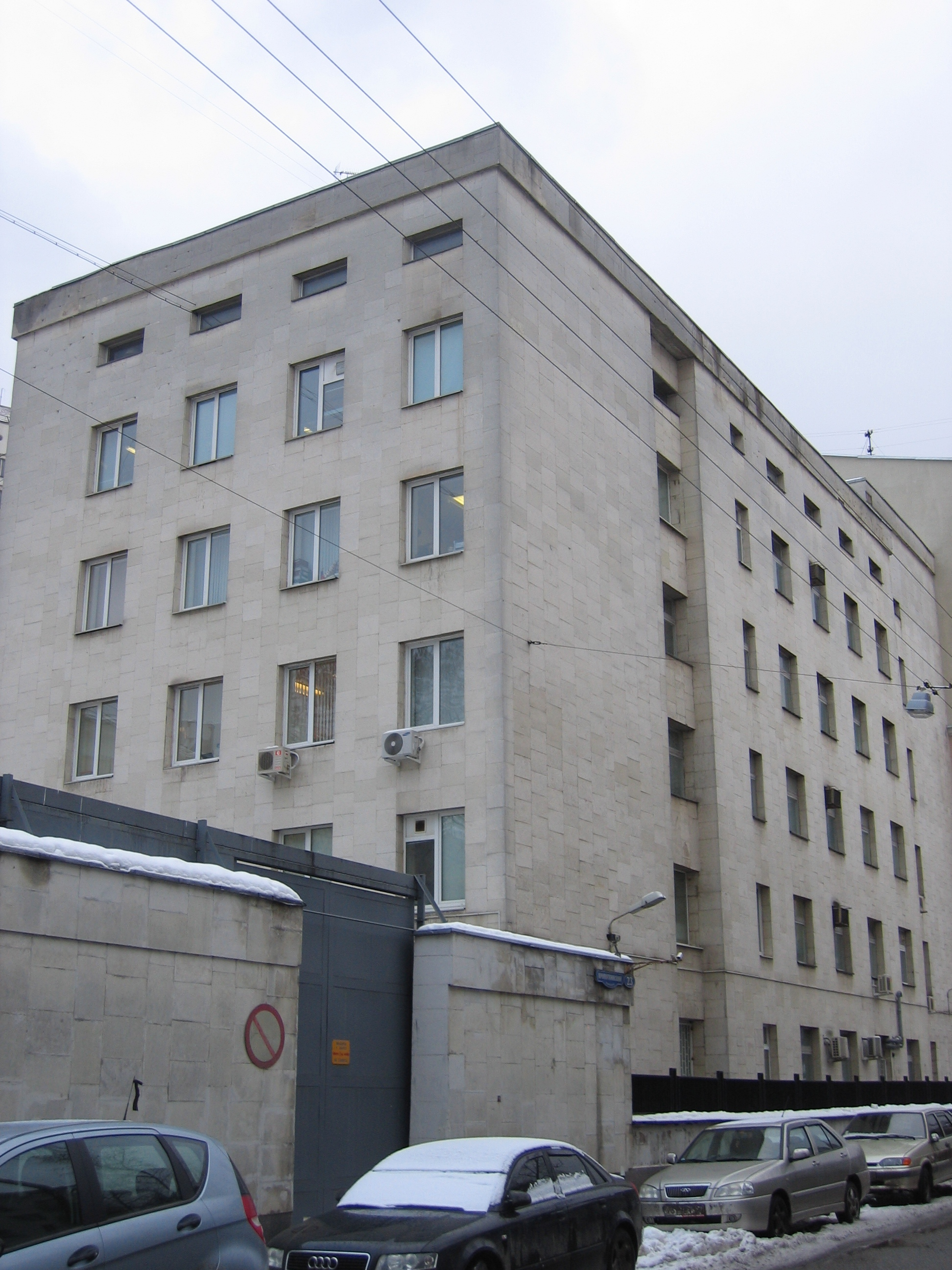
- Part of the institute building in Moscow

Geography
- Location: Moscow, Russia
- Coordinates: 55°44′26″N 37°35′16″E

Organisation
- Type: Specialist
- Patron: Vladimir Serbsky

Services
- Speciality: Psychiatric hospital

History
- Former name: Serbsky Institute
- Opened: 1921

Links
- Lists: Hospitals in Russia

The Serbsky State Scientific Center for Social and Forensic Psychiatry (Russian: Госуда́рственный нау́чный центр социа́льной и суде́бной психиатри́и им. В. П. Се́рбского) is a psychiatric hospital and Russia's main center of forensic psychiatry. In the past, the institution was called the Serbsky Institute (Всесою́зный нау́чно-иссле́довательский институ́т о́бщей и суде́бной психиатри́и и́мени В. П. Се́рбского). From the late 1960s to the early 1980s, the center was used to control and punish Soviet dissidents.

== Institute ==
The Institute started in 1921, and was named after Russian psychiatrist Vladimir Serbsky. One of the main stated purposes of the institute was to assist in forensic psychiatry for the criminal courts. Moscow Serbsky Institute conducts more than 2,500 court-ordered evaluations per year.

The Institute also claimed leadership in studying different types of psychosis, brain trauma, alcoholism and drug addiction. One celebrity treated for an addiction was Vladimir Vysotsky. The Serbsky Center is now headed by Zurab Kekelidze (ru), the chief psychiatrist of the Ministry of Health and Social Development of the Russian Federation, whose dissertation was on sluggish schizophrenia. Kekelidze is known to believe that homosexuality in some cases is a mental disorder and has not been excluded from the list of mental disorders.

== Instrument of Soviet control ==
In the Soviet Union, dissidents were often declared mentally ill. In almost all cases, dissidents were officially examined at the Serbsky Central Research Institute, which evaluated individuals accused under political articles. Typically declared mentally ill, indictees were sent for involuntary treatment to dedicated hospitals in the MVD system. In the 1960s and 1970s, the procedure became public and evidence of "psychiatric terror" began to appear. The majority of incarcerations date from the late 1960s to the early 1980s.

Alexander Esenin-Volpin, Viktor Nekipelov, Suren Arakelov and Zviad Gamsakhurdia were among the victims. Gen. Pyotr Grigorenko was determined as insane in the Serbsky Institute because he "was unshakably convinced of the rightness of his actions" and held "reformist ideas."

In the 1960s Soviet psychiatry, particularly Serbsky Institute Director Dr. Andrei Snezhnevsky, introduced the concept of "sluggish schizophrenia", a special form of the illness that supposedly affects only social behavior, with no effect on other traits: "most frequently, ideas about a struggle for truth and justice are formed by personalities with a paranoid structure", according to the Serbsky Institute professors. Most prisoners, in Viktor Nekipelov’s words, characterized the Serbsky Institute professor Daniil Lunts as "no better than the criminal doctors who performed inhuman experiments on the prisoners in Nazi concentration camps."

== Post-Soviet era ==
The Center underwent many changes after the Soviet Union collapsed. Psychiatry is not used as a weapon against dissenters, according to Center Director Tatyana Dmitrieva. The rooms where Soviet dissidents were imprisoned were changed to treat alcohol and drug addicts.

Many psychiatric trials were pursued in order to protect high-ranking officials involved in rapes and murders, such as Yuri Budanov (he was convicted only after more than three years of trials).

However, Yuri Savenko, the head of the Independent Psychiatric Association of Russia, alleged that "practically nothing has changed. They have no shame at the institute about their role with the Communists. They are the same people, and they do not want to apologize for all their actions in the past." Attorney Karen Nersisyan agrees: "Serbsky is not an organ of medicine. It’s an organ of power." Savenko claimed that the institution was not professionally run and thus violated the doctor's main commandment. Spurious diagnoses declared symptom-free individuals to be mentally ill (for example, Budanov or General Pyotr Grigorenko), and the reverse (for example, major D. Evsyukov, actor F. Yalovega and diplomat Platon Obukhov).

In the early 1990s, Serbsky Director Tatyana Dmitrieva apologized for the earlier abuses. Her words were widely broadcast abroad but were published only in the St. Petersburg newspaper Chas Pik within the country. However, in her 2001 book Aliyans Prava i Milosediya (The Alliance of Law and Mercy), Dmitrieva wrote that there were no psychiatric abuses and certainly no more than in Western countries. Moreover, the book makes the charge that professor Vladimir Serbsky and other intellectuals were wrong not to cooperate with the police department in preventing revolution and bloodsheds and that the current generation is wrong to oppose the regime. In December 2012, Mikhail Vinogradov, an expert of the Serbsky Center, stated "Do you talk about human-rights activists? Most of them are just unhealthy people, I talked with them. As for the dissident General Grigorenko, I too saw him, kept him under observation, and noted oddities of his thinking. But he was eventually allowed to go abroad, as you know… Who? Bukovsky? I talked with him, and he is a completely crazy character. But he too was allowed to go abroad! You see, human rights activists are people who, due to their mental pathology, are unable to restrain themselves within the standards of society, and the West encourages their inability to do so."

In June 2023, Russian president Vladimir Putin ordered the creation of an institute dedicated to the research of ‘social behavior of LGBT people’ at the Serbsky Center, sparking fears about whether this would lead to Russian authorities conducting conversion therapy.

== Instrument of oppression in post-Soviet Russia ==
In the 1990s and the 21st century there were claims, notably by Yuri Savenko, that the Serbsky Institute, now calling itself the Serbsky Center, was again employed as an instrument of oppression. Under Yeltsin (1993-99), it collaborated with the Russian Orthodox Church against "non-traditional" religions, other Christian denominations and breakaway Orthodox churches or liberal Orthodox congregations. Under Putin (2000 to present), it has allegedly made controversial diagnoses for individuals engaged in political dissent and protest.

=== Religious dissenters ===
According to Savenko, from 1994 onwards, the use of psychiatry was expanded to control religious dissenters and others and a special group for “study of the negative influence of religious groups” was created at the Serbsky Center, led by Professor Fyodor Kondratyev.

Savenko further claimed Kondratyev’s group started supervising trials all over the country. This supposedly led to legal actions that, for all intents and purposes, put people on trial for sorcery. The Independent Psychiatric Journal (Nezavisimiy Psikhiatricheskiy Zhurnal) edited by Savenko documented such trials, claiming that the charges of “gross harm to mental health” were not substantiated. Savenko's Independent Psychiatric Association of Russia repeatedly accused Kondratyev's activities and statements as the author of the pseudo-scientific theory of "sectomania", and reported the false charges for which he was allegedly responsible.

Kondratyev's special department at the Serbsky Center “for studying destructive cults” closely collaborated with the anti-cult activist Alexander Dvorkin, who enjoyed some approval within the Russian Orthodox Church. Dvorkin ranks as “totalitarian sects" both the followers of the painter and Theosophist Nikolai Rerikh (1874-1947) and the religious communities of liberal Orthodox priests Yakov Krotov and Georgy Kochetkov. In Yury Savenko's words, “when a psychiatrist-academician (Dmitrieva, Sidorov) or an expert-psychologist of the Institute of Psychology of the Russian Academy of Sciences relies on the works of Dvorkin and Hassan, which are not scientific in nature, it is a symptom of degradation.”

In 2014, experts of the Serbsky Center received medical documents from a psychoneurological out-patients' clinic about the mental health condition of Alexander Dvorkin. After studying them, they concluded that he was in need of constant supervision by a psychiatrist and should take psychotropic drugs.

=== Denial of Soviet-era abuses ===
Kondratyev not only denied accusations that he himself was ever engaged in Soviet abuses of psychiatry: he stated publicly that the very concept of Soviet-era "punitive psychiatry" was nothing more than

"the fantasy [vymysel] of the very same people who are now defending totalitarian sects. This is slander, which was [previously] used for anti-Soviet ends, but is now being used for anti-Russian ends."

According to Savenko, denial by the Serbsky Center of the abuse of psychiatry for political purposes in the 1960–1980s and the open rehabilitation of its leader, director academician Georgi Morozov, are evidence of the restoration of psychiatry as a tool of oppression.

In 2004, proponents of mental health reform failed to prevent the effort by the doctors of the Serbsky Institute to roll back reforms in the landmark Russian Mental Health Law. Savenko also claimed that over five years, from 1998 to 2003, the Serbsky Center made three proposals to amend the Law, but the IPA and general public managed to successfully challenge these amendments, and they were finally abandoned. According to the IPA, these amendments would have impaired patients’ rights.

=== Controversial diagnoses ===
In 2012, Ukrainian psychiatrist Semyon Gluzman said that the Serbsky Institute still remained a leading service for Russian forensic psychiatric examinations. Serbsky Institute continues to conduct many court-ordered evaluations with hotly disputed results.

- In numerous cases people "inconvenient" for Russian authorities were imprisoned in psychiatric institutions in the first decade of the 2000s. Some of them were diagnosed at the Serbsky Institute.
- When war criminal Yuri Budanov was tested at the Institute in 2002, the panel conducting the inquiry was led by Tamara Pechernikova, who had condemned poet Natalya Gorbanevskaya. Budanov was found not guilty by reason of "temporary insanity". After public outrage, he was found sane by another panel that included Georgi Morozov, the former Serbsky director who had declared many dissidents insane in the past.
- The Center also made an evaluation of the alleged mass poisoning of hundreds of Chechen school children. The panel concluded that the disease was caused simply by "psycho-emotional tension".

=== The case of Mikhail Kosenko ===
On 8 October 2013, a verdict was announced in the case of Mikhail Kosenko, who took part in the 6 May 2012 protest march at Moscow's Bolotnaya Square. The court sent Kosenko for open-ended treatment to a psychiatric hospital.

With other witnesses, Alexander Podrabinek, former Soviet dissident and Radio France Internationale commentator, testified that Kosenko had stood next to him and had not scuffled with police. Serbsky specialists concluded that Kosenko "presented a danger to himself and others" and "required compulsory treatment." This conclusion ignored both his previous treatment over many years and his diagnosis by other psychiatrists, and the fact that he was not once cited for aggressive or suicidal behavior during the 16 months of his pretrial detention in Butyrka prison.

The Independent Psychiatric Association of Russia stated:

"On the basis of a conversation that lasted less than one hour, the specialists made the far more serious diagnosis of paranoid schizophrenia instead of the diagnosis of sluggish neurosis-like schizophrenia that Kosenko was treated for over the course of 12 years."

There were protests from international and local NGOs and human rights organisations against the unlimited term of in-patient treatment imposed on Mikhail Kosenko. On 6 June 2014 a court in the Moscow Region ruled that he should continue psychiatric treatment, but as an out-patient.

== Role in post-Soviet forensic examinations ==
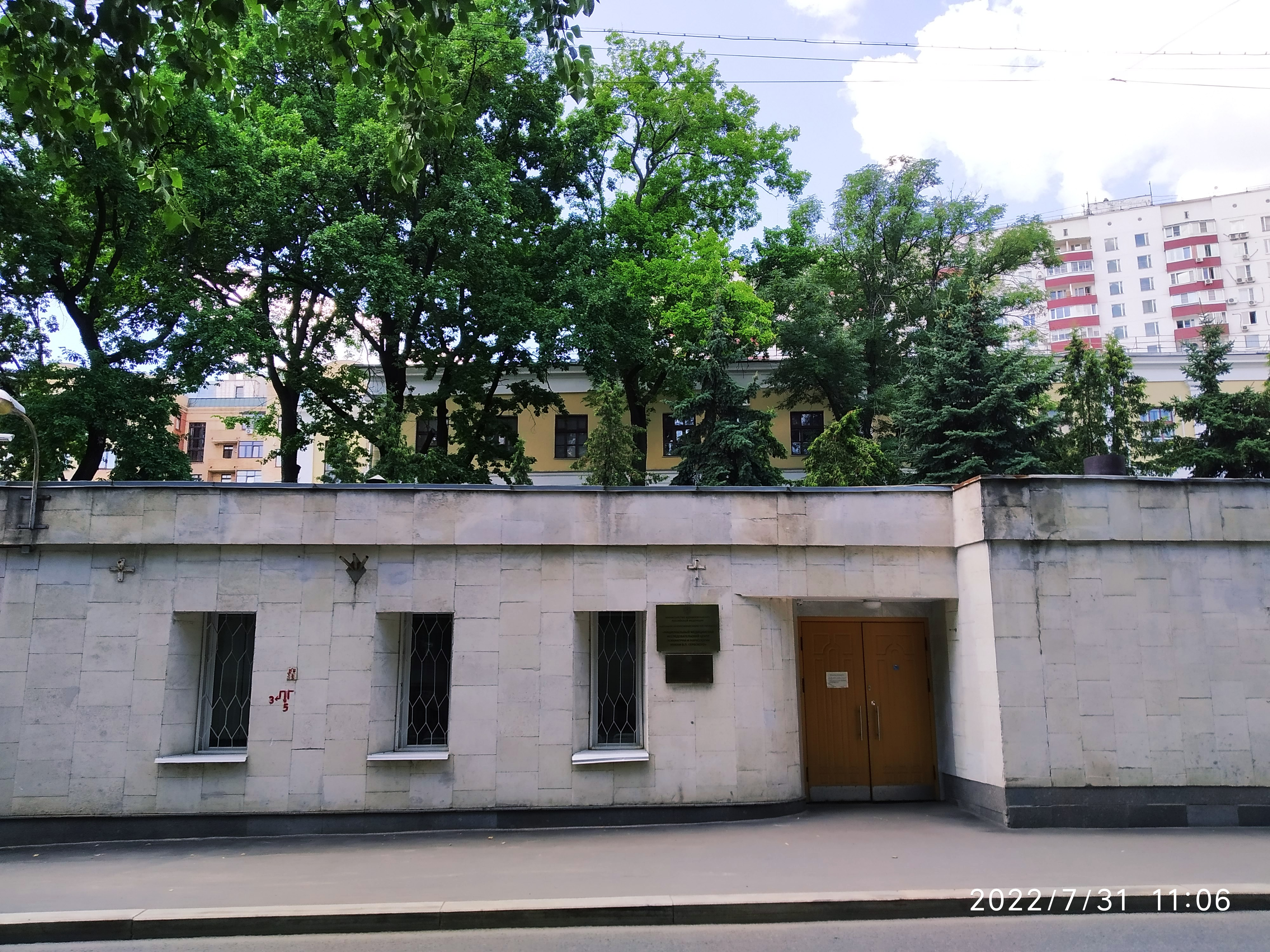
Checkpoint of Serbsky Center in 2022

According to Russian psychiatrist Emmanuil Gushansky, the Serbsky Center exercises undue administrative and corporate influence on its young and insufficiently qualified staff. The commission system of forensic psychiatric examinations leads to "collective irresponsibility" in which no individual is accountable for a particular diagnosis or other recommendation. For example, the Serbsky Center declared a killer to be insane and offered a diagnosis of "acute stress". In fact, the killer had maintained communication with his victim, remembered the conflict with his victim. During a drunken household brawl he managed to find a shotgun in his basement, shoot his victim, clean and hide the weapon, removing his fingerprints, and then flee the scene. In accord with the Center's recommendation, he was declared insane and released from confinement.

In 2004, Yuri Savenko stated that the law on state expert activity and the introduction of the profession of forensic expert psychiatrist destroyed adversary-based examinations and that the Serbsky Center had monopolized forensic examination, which it had never done in the Soviet era. Formerly, the court could include any psychiatrist in a commission of experts, but the new law allowed the court only to choose an institution. The head of the institution assigns the experts to a commission for each case. Experts are certified only after working in a state institution for three years. The Director of the Serbsky Center was also the head of the Center's forensic psychiatry department, which is the only one in the country.

According to Savenko, the Serbsky Center has long labored to institutionalize its monopolistic position as the country's main psychiatric institution. These efforts led to a considerable drop in the quality of expert reports. The Serbsky Center further attempted to eliminate the adversarial character of court proceedings and to degrade the role of specialist reviewers. Lyubov Vinogradova claimed that there has been a diminution in patients' rights because independent experts are now excluded from evaluations and court proceedings.

On 28 May 2009, Savenko wrote to the then President of the Russian Federation Dmitry Medvedev an open letter, in which Savenko asked Medvedev to submit to the State Duma a draft law prepared by the IPA to address the sharp drop in the level of forensic psychiatric examinations, which Savenko attributed to the lack of competition within the sector and its increasing nationalization. The letter said that expert reports now often dropped entire sections and failed to substantiate findings, that findings contradicted the descriptive sections, and that many statements are contrary to generally accepted scientific practice. The letter added that courts made no attempt to assess the expert report for coherence and consistency and do not check findings for accuracy, completeness and objectivity. In the spring of 2009, IPA attacked an expert report whose descriptive part was distorted, paving the way for other falsifications; four of the case's six examinations were carried out in the Serbsky Center.

On 15 June 2009, the working group chaired by Tatyana Dmitrieva sent the Supreme Court of Russia a joint proposal to outlaw appeals against state forensic expert reports and prohibit lawsuits that appealed against the reports. The proposal claimed that the appeals were filed “without regard for the scope of the case” and that appeals should be made “only together with the sentence.” Savenko claimed that all professional errors and omissions became unchallengeable because they were the basis of the sentence.

The application was considered in the paper “Current legal issues relevant to forensic-psychiatric expert evaluation” by E.Y. Shchukina and S.N. Shishkov. It attacked the admissibility of appeals against expert reports without regard for the scope of the case. According to lawyer Dmitry Bartenev, while talking about “the reports”, the paper mistakenly conflates the reports with actions of the experts (or the institution) and asserts the impossibility of “parallel” examinations. However, abuse of rights and legitimate interests of citizens, including trial participants, may be a subject for a separate appeal.

In 2010, when the outpatient forensic-psychiatric examination of Yulia Privedyonnaya was carried out in the Sebsky Center, its experts asked her the question “What do you think of Putin?”. Savenko called the question inappropriate, unseemly and indelicate.

== Publications ==
In 1997, the Center established Russian Journal of Psychiatry dedicated to the issues of social and forensic psychiatry.

== Trivia ==
- In 2014, Russian performance artist Pyotr Pavlensky cut off a piece of his ear while sitting naked outside the Serbsky Center to take a stand against law enforcement's use of forced psychiatric treatment to crack down on dissidents. As Pavlensky said, slicing off his earlobe was meant to represent the damage resulting from police “returning to the use of psychiatry for political goals”.

== In fiction ==
In 1976, Viktor Nekipelov published in samizdat his book Institute of Fools: Notes on the Serbsky Institute documenting his personal experience at Serbsky Psychiatric Hospital. In 1980, the book was translated and published in English. Poet and dissident Viktor Nekipelov was arrested in 1973 and sent to Section 4 of the Serbsky Institute. The evaluation lasted from 15 January to 12 March 1974. He was judged sane, tried and sentenced to two years' imprisonment. He described the doctors and other patients; most of the latter were ordinary criminals feigning insanity in order to avoid prison camps. According to IPA President Savenko, Nekipelov’s book accurately describes the era of Soviet punitive psychiatry. The book was published in Russia in 2005. After reading the book, Donetsk psychiatrist Pekhterev concluded that allegations against the psychiatrists were self-serving and false. According to Robert van Voren, Pekhterev misses the main point: while living conditions in the Serbsky Institute were not bad compared with living conditions of the Gulag, the Serbsky Institute was the departure point for "patients" who were dispatched to specialized psychiatric hospitals in Chernyakhovsk, Dnepropetrovsk, Kazan and Blagoveshchensk where they experienced forced administration of drugs, beatings and other forms of arbitrary punishment. Some died during the "treatment", including Alexey Nikitin.

In the 1983 novel Firefox Down by Craig Thomas, captured American pilot Mitchell Gant is imprisoned in a KGB psychiatric clinic "associated with the Serbsky Institute," where he is drugged and coerced into revealing the location of the Firefox aircraft, which he has stolen and flown out of Russia.

In the 1998 TV series Seven Days, episode 16 "There's something about Olga", the FSB recruits a female patient of the Serbsky Center (incorrectly located in the city of Minsk, Belarus).

== See also ==
- Political abuse of psychiatry in the Soviet Union
- Political abuse of psychiatry in Russia

== Bibliography ==
- Nekipelov, Viktor (1980). Institute of Fools: Notes from the Serbsky. Victor Gollancz. ISBN 978-0575028920.
- Antébi, Elizabeth (1977). Droit d'asiles en Union Soviétique. Paris: Julliard. ISBN 978-2-260-00065-5.
- Applebaum, Anne (2003). Gulag: A History. New York: Doubleday. ISBN 978-0-7679-0056-0.
- Boulet, Marc (2001). Dans la peau d'un... Paris: Seuil. ISBN 978-2-02-038072-0.
- Fireside, Harvey (1982). Soviet Psychoprisons. W. W. Norton, Incorporated. ISBN 978-0393000658.
