= Vladimir Gershuni =

Soviet poet and human rights activist

Vladimir Lvovich Gershuni
- Владимир Львович Гершуни
- Born: 18 March 1930; Moscow, Soviet Union
- Died: 17 September 1994 (aged 64); Moscow, Russia
- Citizenship: Soviet Union (1930–1991) → Russia (1991–1994)
- Occupations: writing poetry, publishing samizdat
- Known for: human rights activism
- Movement: dissident movement in the Soviet Union

Vladimir Lvovich Gershuni (Russian: Влади́мир Льво́вич Гершу́ни, 18 March 1930, Moscow – 17 September 1994, Moscow) was a Soviet dissident and poet. He was a nephew of Grigory Gershuni, a founder of the Socialist Revolutionary Party. He grew up in Soviet children's homes.

== Childhood and first arrest ==
In 1949, during his first year at university, Gershuni was arrested on charges of creating an underground youth organization and was sentenced to 10 years in the camps. Released in 1954, he worked as a bricklayer.

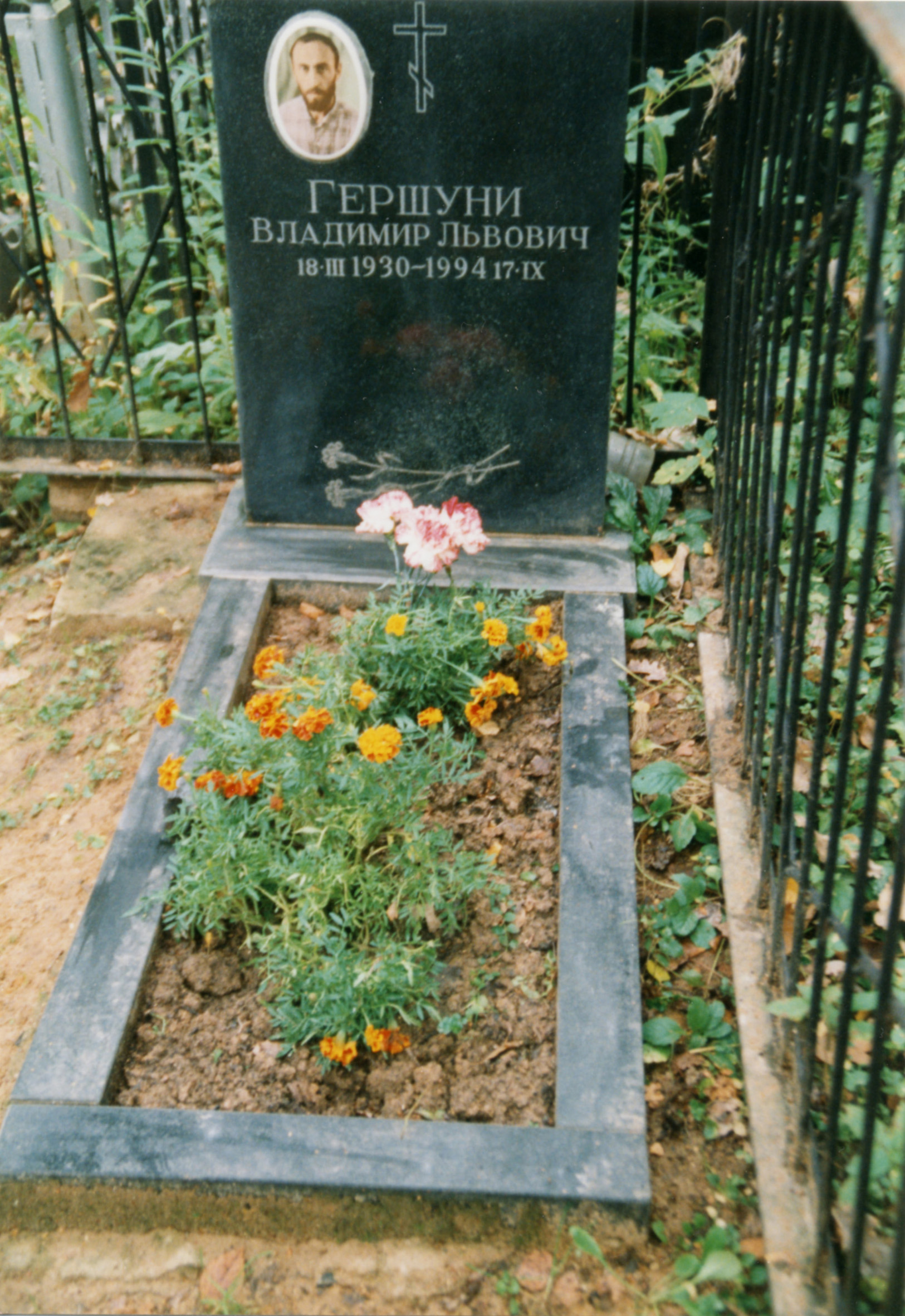
Vladimir Gershuni's grave

== Dissident activities and forced psychiatric treatment ==
In the 1960s, he joined the human rights movement in the Soviet Union, signed a number of collective letters, and participated in collecting materials for Alexander Solzhenitsyn's The Gulag Archipelago, being himself one of the 255 witnesses consulted by the author. In 1969, he was re-arrested, declared insane and sent for compulsory treatment in the Orel special psychiatric hospital. He was released in 1974.

In 1978, a member of the Royal College of Psychiatrists Dr. Gerard Low-Beer visited Moscow and examined nine Soviet political dissidents, including Gershuni, and came to the conclusion that they have no signs of mental illness, which would require mandatory treatment currently or in the past.

== Third arrest ==
In the 1970s, Gershuni resumed his dissident activities as co-editor of the samizdat magazine Poiski (Quest or Investigations, 1976–1978), and was one of the founders in 1979 of "SMOT", the Free Interprofessional Association of Workers. Simultaneously, he published humorous miniatures in the Soviet press under the pseudonym V. Lvov. In 1982, for the third time, Gershuni was arrested. This time he was charged with publishing a SMOT newsletter and placed in specialized psychiatric hospitals, first Blagoveshchensk in the Soviet Far East, then Talgar in the Almaty Region of Kazakhstan.

Like other political prisoners held in psychiatric hospitals, he was not released until 3 December 1987.

== See also ==
- Vladimir Gershuni entries (1968-1987), CCE Name Index
- Political abuse of psychiatry in the Soviet Union
