= Alexander Shatravka =

Soviet dissident and peace activist (born 1950)

- Born: 1950 (age 75–76); Ashgabat
- Known for: Soviet dissident and peace activist
- Notable work: Escape from Paradise

Alexander "Sasha" Ivanovich Shatravka (Russian: Александр Иванович Шатравка; born 6 October 1950) is a Russian-born former Soviet dissident and peace activist who is known for his memoir Escape from Paradise about his experiences as a political prisoner and his escape from the Soviet Union. He now lives in the United States and is a naturalized U.S. citizen.

He is known for his 1974 escape attempt from the Soviet Union as a 24-year-old sailor and for spending nine years as a political prisoner in Soviet psychiatric hospitals and Gulag concentration camps between 1974 to 1979 and 1982 to 1986. In 1983 he was sentenced to three years in prison for circulating a petition calling for the universal abolition of nuclear weapons, following his release in 1979. He was released in 1986, in time for the changes of glasnost and perestroika. He finally made it to the West, and testified before the Commission on Security and Cooperation in Europe on political abuse of psychiatry in the Soviet Union.

He has lived in the United States since 1986 and was naturalized as a U.S. citizen in 1992. His memoir Escape from Paradise was published in Russian in 2010 and in English in 2019.

== Bibliography ==
- Shatravka, Alexander (2019). Escape from Paradise: A Russian Dissident's Journey From The Gulag To The West. Translated by Fitzpatrick, Catherine A. Academica Press. ISBN 978-1680534849.
- Shatravka, Alexander (2010). Pobeg iz Raya. ISBN 978-1-932686-62-3.

== See also ==
- Political abuse of psychiatry in the Soviet Union
