= Daniil Lunts =

Soviet intelligence officer (1912–1977)

Daniil Romanovich Luntz (Russian: Даниил Романович Лунц; 1912–1977) was a KGB agent who ran the Serbsky Institute for Forensic Psychiatry in Moscow.
