= Tatyana Dmitrieva =

Russian psychiatrist (1951–2010)

- Татьяна Дмитриева
- Born: December 21, 1951; Ivanovo, Soviet Union
- Died: March 1, 2010 (aged 58); Moscow, Russian Federation
- Scientific career
- Fields: Psychiatry
- Workplaces: The Serbsky State Scientific Center for Social and Forensic Psychiatry

Tatyana Borisovna Dmitrieva (Russian: Татья́на Бори́совна Дми́триева; 21 December 1951 – 1 March 2010) was a Russian psychiatrist, a member of the Russian Academy of Medical Sciences and Health minister. During the period of 1998-2010, she headed the Serbsky Center.

She is the Director of the Serbsky State Research Centre for Social and Forensic Psychiatry in Moscow, which is responsible for forensic psychiatry for criminal courts. She is also the Head of the Department for Social and Forensic Psychiatry at the Sechenov Medical Academy of Moscow and Vice-Chairperson of the Russian Society of Psychiatrists and Narcologists.

== Publications ==
T.B. Dmitrieva had published 350 scientific works, including 22 monographs. Some of her significant papers are:

- Дмитриева, Т. Б.; Положий, Б. С. (1994). Социальная психиатрия: современные представления и перспективы развития. Обозрение психиатрии и медицинской психологии им. В. М. Бехтерева (in Russian) (2). St. Petersburg: 39–49.
