= Eduard Kuznetsov (dissident) =

Soviet-Israeli dissident and refusenik (1939–2024)

- אדוארד קוזנצוב
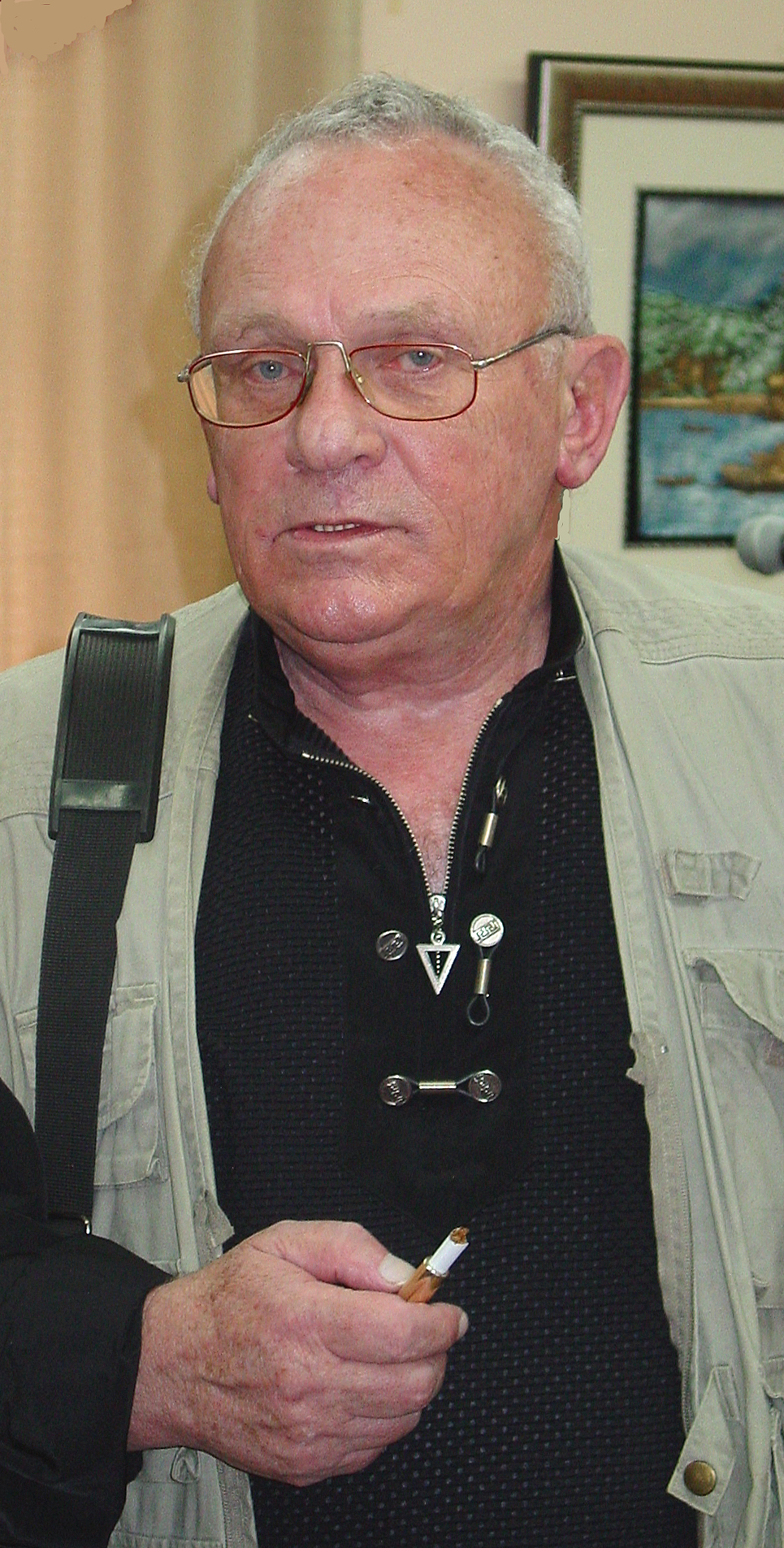
- Kuznetsov in 2009
- Born: 29 January 1939; Moscow, Russian SFSR, USSR
- Died: 22 December 2024 (aged 85); Israel
- Education: Moscow State University
- Writing career
- Years active: 1958–2018
- Notable work: Prison Diaries (1973); Mordovian Marathon (1979); Russian Romance (1984)
- Movement: Human rights movement in the Soviet Union

Eduard Samoilovich Kuznetsov (Russian: Эдуа́рд Само́йлович Кузнецо́в, Hebrew: אדוארד קוזנצוב; 29 January 1939 – 22 December 2024) was a Soviet-Israeli dissident, refusenik, journalist, and writer. One of the leaders of the 1970 Dymshits–Kuznetsov hijacking affair, Kuznetsov's case drew international attention following his death sentence. As a result of global protests, his sentence was commuted to fifteen years' imprisonment.

Kuznetsov was released in 1979 as part of a prisoner exchange between the Soviet Union and the United States. He subsequently made aliyah to Israel. Throughout the 1980s, he participated in the operations of Radio Free Europe/Radio Liberty before beginning the publication of the Russian-language Israeli newspaper Vesti in 1992. Kuznetsov is the author of three novels, two of which were written in prison and smuggled out of the country.

Kuznetsov died in Israel on 22 December 2024, at the age of 85.

== Jewish activism ==
Kuznetsov studied at the philosophy department of Moscow State University.

While at university, Kuznetsov became involved with the first unsanctioned samizdat (self-published) magazines. In 1958-61, he co-edited the underground literary journals Sintaksis and Boomerang, and helped compile the samizdat poetry anthology Phoenix.

In 1961, Kuznetsov was arrested and tried for the first time for his involvement in publishing samizdat, and for making overtly political speeches in poetry readings at Mayakovsky Square in central Moscow. Among those also attending these informal gatherings were Yuri Galanskov, Vladimir Osipov and Vladimir Bukovsky. Kuznetsov was sentenced to seven years imprisonment.

Following his release in 1968, Kuznetsov became one of the primary organisers of the 1970 Dymshits–Kuznetsov hijacking affair alongside Mark Dymshits. Arrested for "high treason," he was set to be executed, but after lodging an appeal and international protests, his sentence was transmuted to fifteen years in prison and labour camp. His case "opened the doors of emigration to thousands of Soviet Jews." In the 1970s, Kuznetsov shared a prison cell with Danylo Shumuk for five years.

In 1979, he and four other dissidents (Dymshits, Baptist preacher Georgi Vins, samizdat writer Alexander Ginzburg, and Ukrainian nationalist Valentyn Moroz) were exchanged for two Soviet spies arrested in the United States. Kuznetsov then immigrated to Israel.

== Literary and other activities ==
From 1983 to 1990, he was chief of the news department of Radio Liberty in Munich. In 1992 he co-founded the Israeli Russian-language newspaper, Vesti (The News), which he edited until 1999.

Kuznetsov was a member of the PEN Club and has been widely published in European, US and Israeli media. He is the author of three novels: Prison Diary (1973), Mordovian Marathon (1979) (both written secretly in prison and smuggled abroad) and Russian Romance (1984). All three have been translated into many languages. In 1974, Prison Diary won the Gulliver Award in France, being declared the best book written by a foreign author.

In 2005, Kuznetsov participated in "They Chose Freedom", a four-part television documentary on the history of the Soviet dissident movement. He lived in Jerusalem, Israel and was a board member of the Gratitude Fund, an organisation supplying financial aid to former Soviet dissidents.

== Bibliography ==
- Kouznetsov, Edouard (1982). "Témoignage" [Testimony]. In Galanskov, Youri (ed.). Le manifeste humain précédé par les témoignages de V. Boukovsky, N. Gorbanevskaïa, A. Guinzbourg, E. Kouznetsov [Human manifesto preceded by testimonies of V. Bukovsky, N. Gorbanevskaya, A. Ginzburg, E. Kuznetsov] (in French). Lausanne: Editions L'Age d'Homme. pp. 47–50. ISBN 2825109207.
