= Trial of the Four =

Trial of the Four Galanskov–Ginzburg trial
- Native name: Процесс четырех
- Date: January 8–12, 1968
- Location: Moscow
- Also known as: Galanskov–Ginzburg trial
- Cause: Samizdat publications
- Participants: Yuri Galanskov; Alexander Ginzburg; Alexey Dobrovolsky; Vera Lashkova
- Charges: Anti-Soviet agitation and propaganda (Article 70 of the RSFSR Criminal Code)
- Verdict: Sentenced to labour camps: Galanskov (7 years); Ginzburg (5 years); Dobrovolsky (2 years); Lashkova (1 year)

The Trial of the Four, also Galanskov–Ginzburg trial, was the 1968 trial of Yuri Galanskov, Alexander Ginzburg, Alexey Dobrovolsky and Vera Lashkova for their involvement in samizdat publications. The trial took place in Moscow City Court on January 8–12. All four defendants were sentenced to terms in labour camps. The trial played a major part in consolidating the emerging human rights movement in the Soviet Union.

== Defendants ==
Yury Galanskov was a second-year student at the Historical Archives Institute and worked at the State Literary Museum in Moscow. From 1959 onwards he took part in readings by young poets in Mayakovsky Square. His poems were published in Sintaksis, a typescript poetry anthology edited by Alexander Ginzburg. In 1966, Galanskov compiled and issued the typewritten literary collection Phoenix-66.

Alexander Ginzburg was a first-year student at the Historical Archives Institute who also worked at the State Literary Museum. In 1959–1960 he helped to organize several unofficial exhibitions of young artists. In 1960, Ginzburg had been sentenced to two years in labour camps in connection with issuing three issues of his Sintaksis poetry collections. Ginzburg put together a collection of materials on the case and trial of writers Sinyavsky and Daniel (later called White Book), and in November 1966 sent copies to deputies of the USSR Supreme Soviet and to the KGB.

Alexey Dobrovolsky was a first-year student at the Moscow State Institute of Culture, working in the State Literary Museum. In 1957 he had been sentenced under article 58-10 of the RSFSR Criminal Code to three years' corrective labour. In 1964, he again faced criminal charges but, after a forensic psychiatric examination, was sent to a special psychiatric prison hospital in Leningrad. Galanskov's literary almanac Phoenix-66 published an article by Dobrovolsky on "Relations between knowledge and faith".

Vera Lashkova worked as a typist at Moscow University and was a second-year student at the Institute of Culture. She typed part of the material for Phoenix and The White Book.

== Lead-up ==
In February 1966, writers Yuli Daniel and Andrei Sinyavsky were sentenced to labour camps on charges of Anti-Soviet agitation and propaganda for having published their satirical writings abroad. Regarding the sentence as unjust and the information on the trial as inadequate, Alexander Ginzburg decided to produce a collection of known materials on the trial. This included reconstructed trial transcripts and protest letters by intellectuals and citizens across the USSR which were not published in the official press.

The collection, which became known as The White Book, was complete at the end of November 1966. Ginzburg produced five typewritten copies of the collection and sent them signed with his own name to deputies of the USSR Supreme Soviet, and to the KGB. He was summoned to the KGB in December and urged to repudiate the collection, to stop its circulation and to state who had helped him compile it. Ginzburg refused, and was informed that he would soon be arrested.

In December 1966 Yuri Galanskov had finished work on a typewritten literary magazine titled Phoenix-66. In this miscellany, he included material in samizdat circulation among the Moscow intelligentsia, such as his own letter to writer Mikhail Sholokokhov, in which he condemned the writer for his position on the Daniel–Sinyavsky case.

In January 1967 the place of Vera Lashkova, who had helped type Phoenix-66 and The White Book, was searched and documents confiscated. This was followed by the arrest of Galanskov and Alexey Dobrovolsky, who also had published in Phoenix-66, on 19 January 1967. Vera Lashkova herself was arrested on 21 January 1967. Alexander Ginzburg was arrested on 23 January 1967.

The arrested spent the next twelve months in pre-trial detention in Moscow's Lefortovo Prison.

== Trial ==
=== Charges ===
All four defendants were charged with Article 70 of the RSFSR Criminal Code (Anti-Soviet agitation and propaganda):

- Ginzburg was charged with the article for compiling the White Book on the Sinyavsky–Daniel case.
- Galanskov was charged for editing the typewritten literary almanac Phoenix-66.
- Dobrovolsky was charged for his article on "Relations between knowledge and faith" in Phoenix-66. Additionally, he was accused of dealing in foreign currency.
- Lashkova was charged for assisting in the typing of the White Book and Phoenix-66.

All four were additionally accused of "criminal association" with the emigre anti-Soviet organization National Alliance of Russian Solidarists, a charge that was stressed in the propaganda campaign around the trial.

=== Hearings ===
The hearings took place between 8 January and 12 January 1968 in Moscow City Court.

While the trial was formally public, admission to it was by permit issued by district committees of the Communist Party. As a sign of protest, supporters of the accused stood on the street in front of the court during the hearings.

The case of the defendants was taken up by three prominent Moscow defence lawyers: Dina Kaminskaya, Sofiya Kalistratova, and Boris Zolotukhin. Uncommonly for Soviet trials, they did not disassociate themselves from the politically accused defendants. Zolotukhin opened his defence with the words "I have the honor to defend Aleksander Ginzburg." Stating that "I need not dwell on Ginzburg's moral virtues, as, whether he is a good or an evil man, I can confidently state that he is not a guilty one," he called for his complete acquittal. Zolotukhin's final statement widely circulated in samizdat. All three lawyers were subsequently barred from legal cases, and Zolotukhin was removed from the Collegium of Lawyers and from his post as head of a legal consultation office.

Yuri Galanskov and Alexander Ginzburg disputed the criminal nature of their activity and plead not guilty. Vera Lashkova plead not guilty to anti-Soviet agitation under article 70. She asked to reclassify her offence under the less severe article 190-1 which does not stipulate intent to subvert the Soviet system. Alexey Dobrovolsky had worked with the prosecution and plead guilty to the charges.

=== Sentence ===
On 12 January 1968, the court found all defendants guilty. The four were sentenced to forced labour:

- Yury Galanskov was sentenced to seven years' imprisonment to be served in strict-regime camps;
- Alexander Ginzburg was sentenced to five years;
- Alexey Dobrovolsky was sentenced to two years;
- Vera Lashkova was sentenced to one year.

The lawyers of all four convicted individuals entered appeals. The appeals were heard in the Russian Supreme Court on 16 April 1968. The sentence of the Moscow City Court was upheld.

Vera Lashkova had spent her entire sentence in pre-trial detention and was released. Yuri Galanskov, Alexander Ginzburg and Alexey Dobrovolsky were sent to camps in Mordovia. Yuri Galanskov died in the camps after an unsuccessful operation for a stomach ulcer in 1972.

== Aftermath ==
=== Demonstration ===
In January 1967, a protest followed against the arrest of Ginzburg and Galanskov, and against the introduction of new articles to the Criminal Code that restricted the right to protest. Students Vladimir Bukovsky, Vadim Delaunay, Victor Khaustov and Evgeny Kushev were arrested for organizing and taking part. Delaunay and Kushev received suspended sentences. Vladimir Bukovsky was sentenced to three years hard labour. Bukovsky attacked the legal conduct of the case in his final words, which circulated in samizdat and as part of materials about the demonstration compiled by Pavel Litvinov.

=== Letter writing campaigns ===
Over the course of 1967 and 1968, the Trial of the Four motivated a renewed wave of podpisanty (signatories), individuals who signed a series of petitions against repression and re-Stalinization. At this time, such protest was made at risk of expulsions from education or hindered careers. The dissident periodical Chronicle of Current Events lists 91 names of people subject to extrajudicial reprisals in connection with protesting the trial.

Andrei Sakharov sent a letter to the Central Committee of the Communist Party in February 1967, asking that the case be closed. He was deemed an "unstable politician", and his salary was cut by half.

Dissident general Pyotr Grigorenko warned in an "Open Letter to the Budapest Conference of Communist Parties" that "the possibility of a renewal of Stalinism exists as long as there is no glasnost of the judicial process, which was not present in Stalinist times.".

In November 1967, 116 Soviet intellectuals, including mathematician and initiator of the 1965 glasnost rally Alexander Esenin-Volpin, Larisa Bogoraz and Pavel Litvinov, signed an appeal to the Court in which they demanded to be able attend the trial as formally guaranteed by the constitution, and criticized the practice of admitting people according to special lists and passes.

=== Appeal to World Public Opinion ===
The judicial trial of [Yuri] Galanskov, [Aleksandr] Ginzburg, [Aleksei] Dobrovolsky and [Vera] Lashkova, which is taking place at present in the Moscow City Court, is being carried out in violation of the most important principles of Soviet law. [...] We pass this appeal to the Western progressive press, and ask for it to be published and broadcast by radio as soon as possible. We are not sending this request to Soviet newspapers because that is hopeless.

— Appeal to "To World Public Opinion" by Larisa Bogoraz and Pavel Litvinov

As the trial was underway, physics teacher Pavel Litvinov and linguist Larisa Bogoraz issued a famous one-page "appeal to world public opinion". In it, they protested against the closed hearings in which "the courtroom is filled with specially selected people, officials of the KGB and volunteer militia, who give the appearance of an open public trial". Reminding readers of "the celebrated trials of the 1930s," Bogoraz and Litvinov listed in detail the violations of law and justice committed during the trial, and asked the Soviet and world public to demand that the prisoners be released from custody and that the trial be repeated in the presence of international observers. The appeal was notable for departing from the accepted tradition of addressing appeals to Soviet officials, and became the first direct appeal by dissidents to the international public. The document was signed with their full names and addresses and was transmitted on foreign radio stations broadcasting in the Soviet Union on 11 January 1968.

=== The Trial of the Four ===
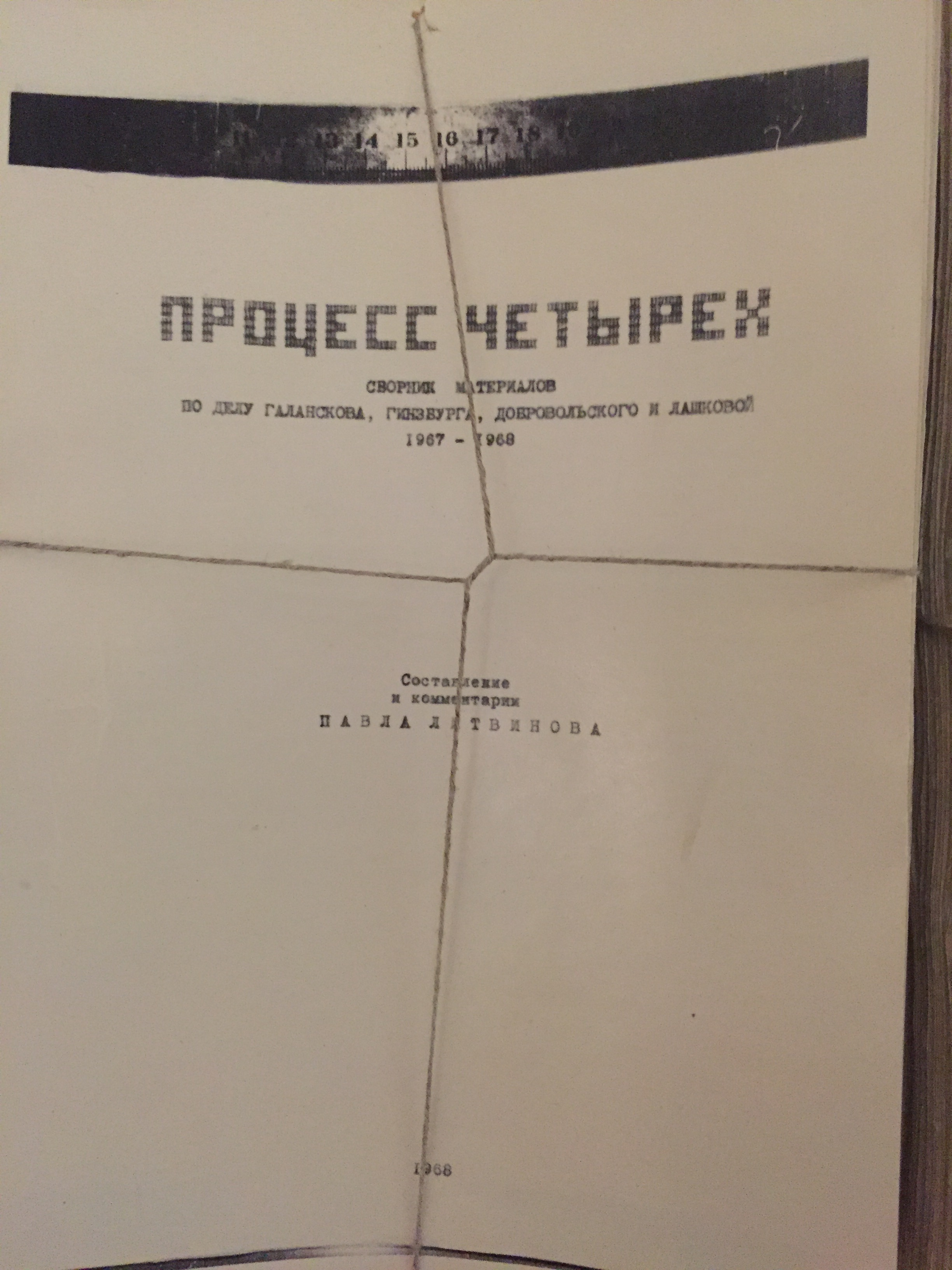
Photocopy of a typewritten copy of The Trial of the Four by Pavel Litvinov

Following the tradition of the convicted Ginzburg's White Book, a samizdat account of the "trial of the four" was in turn compiled by Pavel Litvinov. It included transcripts of the hearings (reconstructed from notes taken during the trial and eyewitness accounts), coverage of the trial in the Soviet press as well as the texts of the numerous protest letters and appeals that were sent by dissenting citizens. It circulated in samizdat and was published in London and New York as The Trial of the Four.

== See also ==
- Sinyavsky–Daniel trial
- Human rights movement in the Soviet Union
