= Mayakovsky Square poetry readings =

Soviet and Russian opposition activity

During the 1950s and 1960s, the Mayakovsky Square (now the Triumfalnaya Square) in Moscow played an important role as a gathering place for unofficial poetry readings, and subsequently for expressing cultural and political dissent in the post-Stalin era.

== Precursor ==
On July 29, 1958, a monument to Vladimir Mayakovsky was unveiled in Moscow's Mayakovsky Square. At the official opening ceremony, a number of official Soviet poets read their poems. When the ceremony was over, volunteers from the crowd started reading poetry as well. The atmosphere of relatively free speech attracted many, and public readings at the monument soon became regular. Young people, mainly students, assembled almost every evening to read the poems of forgotten or repressed writers. Some also read their own work, and discussed art and literature. Among the young poets who read their own work to huge crowds in Mayakovsky Square were Yevgeny Yevtushenko and Andrei Voznesensky, who walked a thin line between being able to publish in the Soviet Union and representing a spirit of youthful protest. They were alternately reproached and disciplined, but tolerated. The spontaneous gatherings, however, were soon stopped by the authorities.

== Gatherings in 1960-61 ==
Выйду на площадь и городу в ухо
Втисну отчаянья крик!
...
Это - я,
призывающий к правде и бунту,
не желающий больше служить,
рву ваши черные путы,
сотканные из лжи!

I'll go out on the Square
and into the city's ear
I'll hammer a cry of despair!
...
This is me
calling to truth and revolt
willing no more to serve
I break your black tethers
woven of lies!

— Manifesto of Man by Yuri Galanskov, 1960

The gatherings at Mayakovsky's statue were revived in September 1960, again as poetry readings, but this time with a more openly political character. They were organized by biology student Vladimir Bukovsky with a small circle of university friends, but gathered momentum quickly and were soon taking place regularly. The Square and statue became known to some as "Mayak" (lighthouse).

Usually several hundred people gathered each occasion in the square. The participants in the 1960-61 readings included the "veterans" of two years before, as well as a new layer of young people. Poetry by Nikolay Gumilev, Boris Pasternak and Osip Mandelstam was read. Soviet Nonconformist Art and works by formalists were also circulated.

=== Nonconformism and samizdat ===
Among the participants were both those interested in pure art, and those inspired by dissident politics of various stripes. Many of those gathering in the square insisted on the right of art to remain "free of politics". Others were drawn to the readings because of their social implications. This included an oppositionist student movement which had already begun to develop immediately out of the shock of Khrushchev's 1956 report on Stalin's purges. For these, like Bukovsky and his colleagues, "the right of art to be independent was merely one point of opposition to the regime, and we were here precisely because art happened to be at the centre of political passions."

The circle of students who had organized the Mayakovsky Square also began publishing unofficial poetry in the first samizdat ("self-published") journals. They published their own poems but also those of Nikolay Zabolotsky, Dmitri Kedrin and Marina Tsvetaeva. Poet and journalist Aleksandr Ginzburg managed to get out three issues of Sintaksis before he was arrested for the first time in 1960. In November 1960, Vladimir Osipov produced one issue of a journal called Bumerang, which was modeled on Ginzburg's work. A third samizdat journal, Feniks-61, was produced by Yuri Galanskov in 1961.

Usual punitive measures for these activities included expulsion and blacklisting from institutes. The active participants of the gatherings were regularly subject to searches. Fights were provoked in the square, and sometimes the monument was cordoned off during the usual meeting times. The readings at Mayakovsky Square became the incubator not only for a new generation of poets but for a generation of dissidents. Vladimir Osipov, one of the organizers gatherings and a later dissident, stated that "it seems it is impossible to find a famous dissident from among the young, who thundered at the end of the sixties and the first half of the seventies, who would hot have appeared at that time [in the early sixties] on Mayakovsky Square, who did not spend his youth there."

=== Final readings and arrests ===
The atmosphere was tense in the extreme and plainclothesmen were ready to pounce at any moment. At last, when [Anatoly] Shchukin started reading, they let out a howl and made a dash through the crowd in the direction of the statue... A gigantic fist-fight broke out. Many people had no idea who was fighting whom and joined in just for the fun of it... The police were generally unpopular anyhow and on this occasion I feared that the crowd would overturn the police car and kick it to pieces. But somehow or other the police succeeded in bundling Shchukin and Osipov into a car and extricated it from the crowd. Shchukin got fifteen days “for reading anti-Soviet verses” and Osipov ten days “for disturbing the peace and using obscene language”... This episode alone indicates what an extraordinary time it was.

— Vladimir Bukovsky on the 1961 Mayakovsky commemoration

On April 14, 1961, the Mayakovsky Square group organized a reading specifically to commemorate the anniversary of Mayakovsky's suicide. The commemoration turned out to be the largest and most eventful gathering in the square. It coincided with a holiday to celebrate Yuri Gagarin's space flight, and the square was filled with bystanders, many of whom joined the crowd around Mayakovsky's statue out of curiosity. The meeting was broken up.

Many of those involved in the readings were arrested in the summer of 1961. Vladimir Osipov, Eduard Kuznetsov and Ilya Bokshteyn were soon after convicted under article 70 “anti-Soviet agitation and propaganda” for allegedly attempting to create an underground organization. Osipov and Kuznetsov received seven years in labor camps, and Bokshetyn five years. Vladimir Bukovsky was interrogated twice in spring 1961, and thrown out of university that year.

By the autumn of 1961, news of the readings in Mayakovsky Square had begun to filter out to the foreign press, and an open campaign began to crush them. The KGB brought snowplows to the Square and circled them around the Mayakovsky statue to prevent the readings from taking place. After a final gathering on the opening day of the 22nd Congress of the Communist Party of the Soviet Union in October of the same year, the readings were officially banned.

== Revival in 1965 ==
In 1965, the gatherings in Mayakovsky Square were briefly revived again by a new youth group called SMOG. The acronym could be deciphered as the Russian words "boldness, thought, image and depth," or "the youngest society of geniuses". The SMOGists expressed a trend of 1964-65 toward greater organization among literary dissidents, as compared to the more unstructured and spontaneous readings of the early sixties. For them, concerns for literary freedom were mixed with a political interest in the Russian revolutionary tradition from the Decembrists to Lenin, and in other leaders who had opposed Stalin, such as Trotsky and Bukharin.

On April 14, 1965, SMOGists organized what they described as a "literary-political" meeting to commemorate the anniversary of Mayakovsky’s death. They used the symbolism of the occasion to make a series of demands. Among their demands were the official recognition of SMOG by the Writers' Union.

Despite the introduction of new articles in the Criminal Code in the wake of the Sinyavsky-Daniel trial, directed against "group actions which violate public order", a last SMOGist demonstration took place on September 28. The participants were beaten, and the members of SMOG decided to stop the meetings.

== Revival in 2022 ==
On 25 September 2022, 33-year-old poet Artyom Kamardin recited a poem opposed to the Russian invasion of Ukraine in what was now called Triumfalnaya Square for which in the following year he, attendee Yegor Shtovba and another participant, Nikolai Dayneko, were given severe prison sentences.

== Cultural references ==
The film Moscow Does not Believe in Tears from 1979 references the gatherings. Poet Andrei Voznesensky is seen reciting his poem Antiworlds on the square.

== Bibliography ==
- Bukovskii (1979). To build a castle: my life as a dissenter. New York: Viking Press. ISBN 9780670716401.
- Rubenstein, Joshua (1985). Soviet dissidents: their struggle for human rights (2nd ed., rev. and expanded ed.). Boston: Beacon Press. ISBN 0807032158.
- Bukovskii, Vladimir (1997). "Gaid-park po-sovetski". In Polikovskaia, Liudmila (ed.). My predchuvstvie… predtecha…. Zveniia. pp. 8–22. (Google Books)
- Sundaram, Chantal (2006). ""The stone skin of the monument": Mayakovsky, Dissent and Popular Culture in the Soviet Union". Toronto Slavic Quarterly (16).
- Hornsby, Rob (2013). Protest, reform and repression in Khrushchev's Soviet Union. New studies in European history. Cambridge, U.K.; New York: Cambridge University Press. ISBN 9781107030923.
