= Vladimir Osipov =

Russian writer (1938–2020)

Vladimir Nikolaevich Osipov
- Владимир Николаевич Осипов
- Born: 9 August 1938; Slantsy, Russian SFSR, Soviet Union
- Died: 20 October 2020 (aged 82); Moscow, Russia
- Known for: Editor of Veche (1971–1973)

Vladimir Nikolaevich Osipov (Russian: Влади́мир Никола́евич О́сипов; 9 August 1938 – 20 October 2020) was a Russian writer who founded the Soviet samizdat journal Veche (Assembly). The journal is considered to be an important document of the nationalist or Slavophile strand within the Soviet dissident movement.

== Biography ==
Vladimir Osipov was born on 9 August 1938 in Slantsy, Leningrad Oblast.

He entered studies at the History faculty of Moscow State University. He was expelled in 1959 for protesting the arrest of Anatoly Ivanov, a fellow student, but was able to finish his studies at the Moscow Pedagogical Institute in 1960.

As a student, Osipov was involved in reviving the informal Mayakovsky Square poetry readings in 1960. During this time, he produced a samizdat (self-published) literary journal Boomerang.

In 1961, Osipov was sentenced to seven years in strict-regime labour camps for "Anti-Soviet propaganda". In the camps, he converted to Christianity. He was released in 1968 and managed to find work as a fireman.

During the years 1971-1973, Osipov produced nine issues of the samizdat journal Veche (Assembly). The journal was to be a "Russian patriotic journal" that followed the tradition of Fyodor Dostoyevsky and the Slavophiles, taking what Osipov called a "Russophile" position.

Osipov also edited the samizdat journal Zemlia (Earth) in 1974, with a more religious orientation. Zemlia carried material by Russian Orthodox dissenters such as Anatoly Levitin-Krasnov.

In 1974, Osipov was arrested, tried, and sentenced to a second term for engaging in "anti-Soviet propaganda".

Osipov took part in the defence of the parliament during the attempted hard-line coup against Gorbachev in August 1991.

During the 1990s and early 2000s, Osipov was active as one of the leaders of the Union "Christian Rebirth" (UCR), which calls for the establishment of a constitutional monarchy.

His third wife was writer Adel Naidenovich, who also participated in the samizdat journal Veche.

Osipov died on 20 October 2020 in Moscow.
