= Gratitude Fund =

Non-profit organization in New York

The Gratitude Fund is a non-profit organization in New York which provide assistance to veterans of the active struggle for freedom and human rights in the former USSR such as ex-political prisoners, who were imprisoned for many years, and to the families of dissidents who died in the Soviet prisons.

Yuri Fedorov founded the Fund in 1998 and served as its president until he died in September 2022.

== Board of Directors ==
- Vladimir Bukovsky
- Alexander Ginzburg
- Eduard Kuznetsov
- Yuri Yarim-Agaev
- Yuri Fedorov
