= Sinyavsky–Daniel trial =

Show trial of Soviet dissident writers

- Native name: Процесс Синявского и Даниэля
- Date: February 10–13, 1966
- Location: Moscow, Russian SFSR, Soviet Union
- Cause: satires smuggled abroad and published under pen names
- Participants: Andrei Sinyavsky, Yuli Daniel
- Charges: anti-Soviet agitation and propaganda (Article 70 of the RSFSR Criminal Code)
- Verdict: Sinyavsky was sentenced to seven years in strict-regime labor camp, Yuli Daniel was sentenced to five years

The Sinyavsky–Daniel trial (Russian: Проце́сс Синя́вского и Даниэ́ля) was a show trial in the Soviet Union against the writers Andrei Sinyavsky and Yuli Daniel in February 1966. Sinyavsky and Daniel were convicted of the offense of anti-Soviet agitation and propaganda in a Moscow court for publishing their satirical writings of Soviet life abroad under the pseudonyms Abram Tertz and Nikolai Arzhak. The Sinyavsky–Daniel trial was the first Soviet show trial where writers were openly convicted solely for their literary work, provoking appeals from many Soviet intellectuals and other public figures outside the Soviet Union. The Sinyavsky–Daniel led to the Glasnost meeting, the first spontaneous public political demonstration in the Soviet Union after World War II. Sinyavsky and Daniel pled not guilty, unusual for a political charge in the Soviet Union, but were sentenced to seven and five years in labor camps, respectively.

The Sinyavsky-Daniel case is widely considered to mark the end of the liberal Khrushchev Thaw period and the rise of political repression in the Soviet Union under hardliner Leonid Brezhnev, and a major starting impulse for the Soviet dissident movement.

== Trial ==
=== Background ===
Andrei Sinyavsky, a well-known literary critic and writer in the Soviet Union, and his friend Yuli Daniel, a writer and translator, had begun sending their works to be published in the West due to strong censorship in the Soviet Union. Sinyavsky and Daniel often wrote topical stories and novellas that were satirical or critical of Soviet society, and would naturally be rejected for publication by the ruling Communist Party of the Soviet Union (CPSU). Sinyavsky and Daniel's works were smuggled out of the Soviet Union as samizdat (illegal self-published writings) to the West and published in foreign editorials under pseudonyms to protect their identities. Sinyavsky began publishing under the pen name Abram Tertz in Paris in 1959, and Daniel began publishing under the pen name Nikolai Arzhak in 1961. The publication of Daniel's This is Moscow Speaking and Sinyavsky's The Trial Begins in the West between 1959 and 1962 caught the attention of the KGB, the main security agency and secret police of the Soviet Union. Although the KGB was not familiar with the authors, they soon discovered that Arzhak, the author of This is Moscow Speaking, was the pseudonym of Yuli Daniel, and that Tertz was the pseudonym of his friend Andrei Sinyavsky. Both writers were placed under round-the-clock surveillance and their apartments were secretly searched. Information was also gathered from Sinyavsky and Daniel's colleagues acting as informants as well as KGB agents posing as neighbors' relatives.

On 13 September 1965, Andrei Sinyavsky was arrested, and Yuli Daniel's arrest followed five days later. Initially, leaders of the CPSU were hesitant about prosecuting Sinyavsky and Daniel, but the trial pressed ahead under the initiative of General Secretary Leonid Brezhnev, the new leader of the Soviet Union. Brezhnev personally consulted with Konstantin Fedin, the head of the Union of Soviet Writers of which Sinyavsky was an official member. Fedin, who had been criticized in an essay by Sinyavsky, urged him to make an example of the writers. On 13 January 1966, Brezhnev made the final decision to go ahead with the trial. In October 1965, Sinyavsky and Daniel's detention became publicly known when Giancarlo Vigorelli, the Secretary General of the European Community of Writers, raised the question at a meeting of the organization in Rome. In November, General Secretary of the Union of Soviet Writers Alexey Surkov admitted that the writers were in custody and gave an assurance that "legality" of the trial would be observed. The Soviet public learned of the arrest of the writers only in January 1966, three months after their arrest, when Izvestia published an article about the case entitled "The Turncoats", described Sinyavsky and Daniel as "were-wolves" and "renegades" guilty of "high treason". Referencing foreign criticism, it warned that no leniency would be shown to the defendants.

=== Charges ===
Sinyavsky and Daniel's offenses were not illegal under Soviet law, as neither publication abroad nor the use of pseudonyms were prohibited. Instead, Sinyavsky and Daniel were charged, under the recently minted Article 70 of the RSFSR Criminal Code, with the offense of anti-Soviet agitation and propaganda. The article punished

Agitation or propaganda carried on for the purpose of subverting or weakening of the Soviet regime ['vlast'] or of committing particular, especially dangerous crimes against the state, or the circulation, for the same purpose of slanderous fabrications which defame the Soviet state and social system, or the circulation or preparation or keeping, for the same purposes, of literature with such content.

Sinyavsky and Daniel's works published abroad were considered to consciously intend to subvert and weaken the Soviet system and constitute anti-Soviet propaganda – the first time that the article was applied to fiction.

=== Hearings ===
The hearings began on February 10, 1966, in Moscow City Court under chairman of the court Lev Smirnov. The trials of Sinyavsky and Daniel were not open to the public or foreign observers, and only fragments of the proceedings reached the outside world.

Citing their works, the prosecution claimed Sinyaysky and Daniel had purposefully attempted to make the Soviet state look corrupt and immoral on the world stage. Sinyavsky's and Daniel's literary works were themselves presented as evidence.

The defendants in turn claimed to be loyal Soviet citizens who wanted to strengthen the Soviet Union by eliminating remnants of Stalinist abuses. Both writers argued that accusations of "slander" cannot be applied to literary works. Rather surprisingly, the authors were even accused of slandering the Russian people for depicting alcoholism in their satirical novels. Sinyavsky repeatedly stated that the prosecution's line of argument eliminated the difference between an author and his characters. Unusual for political trials in the Soviet Union, both writers entered a plea of not guilty.

=== Sentence ===
On 12 February 1966, the court sentenced Yuli Daniel to five years in a strict-regime labor camp. The next day, Andrei Sinyavsky was sentenced to seven years in a strict-regime labor camp. Daniel and Sinyavsky were sent to the special labor camps for political criminals in Mordovia, with both spending time in the Dubravlag.

Daniel served his five-year full term, and after his release lived in the cities of Kaluga and Moscow until his death in 1988. Sinyavsky served six years until his early release in 1971 under an initiative of Yuri Andropov, at the time Chairman of the KGB. In 1973, two years after his release, Sinyavsky emigrated to France where he became a professor of Russian literature and published numerous autobiographical and retrospective works.

In 1991, the Supreme Court of the RSFSR rescinded the verdict and sentences against Sinyavsky and Daniel, and ordered the case closed for lack of the elements of a crime.

== Significance and legacy ==
=== Reaction abroad ===
Articles in the New York Times and Le Monde as early as October 1965 profiled the case. During the hearings in February 1966, foreign correspondents waited outside the courtroom alongside Soviet citizens. Although the trial remained closed to the Western press, the defendants' wives smuggled out their own handwritten transcripts, which became some of the earliest samizdat documents to reach the West. The transcript was delivered to the bureau of Radio Liberty in Paris and passed on to the New York Times, on the theory that the news would have a greater impact if carried first by the Times than the avowedly anti-communist Radio Liberty.

The trial was universally condemned in the Western media and drew criticism from public figures from around the world. PEN International as well as individual writers such as W. H. Auden, William Styron and Hannah Arendt expressed their indignation. Others who petitioned for the writers' release were Heinrich Böll, Günter Grass, Lillian Hellman, Saul Bellow, Norman Mailer, Robert Lowell, Philip Roth, Marguerite Duras and Philip Toynbee. After Sinyavsky and Daniel's conviction, Graham Greene unsuccessfully asked for his royalties in the Soviet Union to be paid over to their wives.

Criticism of the trial and sentences was also shared by socialist and communist publications in Great Britain, the United States, Italy, and France. Lifelong communist Louis Aragon published his concerns in a declaration in L'Humanité, and, together with Jean-Paul Sartre, subsequently refused to participate in the Tenth Congress of Soviet Writers. The Scandinavian Communist parties condemned the trial outright.

In the spring of 1968, the US ambassador to the United Nations Arthur Goldberg attempted to draw the attention of the UN Human Rights Commission to the plight of the imprisoned writers, describing the trial as "an outrageous attempt to give the form of legality to the suppression of a basic human right." The Soviet delegation, Iran and countries of communist and the Afro-Asian bloc secured the deletion of this speech from the records of the commission.

=== Internal reaction ===
The proceedings were framed by denunciations in the media, headed by the newspapers Pravda, Izvestia and Literaturnaya Gazeta. The papers also published collective condemnation letters by Soviet citizens. Then-recent Nobel laureate Mikhail Sholokhov called the two writers "werewolves" and "thugs with a black conscience" who would deserve a significantly more severe punishment "in the memorable twenties". In response, Lidia Chukovskaya accused Sholokhov of betraying the centuries-long tradition of protecting fellow literators from unfair persecution and asserted that his "shameful speech will not be forgotten by History".

Nonetheless, the trial provoked protests. A letter which became known as the "Letter of the 63" (also: 62), signed by members of the USSR Union of Writers, was addressed to the presidium of the Twenty-Third Congress of the Communist Party. It argued that "neither learning nor art can exist if neither paradoxical ideas can be expressed nor hyperbolic images used as an artistic device." The authors called for the release of the writers on bail and argued that the trial itself did more harm than the works of the writers. Among the signatories were Korney Chukovsky, Ilya Ehrenburg, Viktor Shklovsky, Venyamin Kaverin, Bella Akhmadulina, Bulat Okudzhava and Arseny Tarkovsky.

We think that any attempt to whitewash Stalin can cause a serious split in Soviet society. Stalin bears responsibility not only for the numerous deaths of innocent people, for our lack of preparation for the [Second World] war, for the divergences from the Leninist norms of the party and the state life. His crimes and wrongdoing distorted the idea of communism to such a degree that our people would never forgive him. [...]

The issue of Stalin’s political rehabilitation is not only an issue for our domestic but also for our foreign policy. Any step towards his rehabilitation would undoubtedly lead to a new split within the world communist movement, now between us and communists in the West. From their point of view, such a rehabilitation would be considered as our capitulation to the Chinese [communist leadership]. [...] Nowadays, when we are threatened both by the activity of the American imperialists and the West Germans seeking revenge and by the leaders of the Communist Party of China, it would be absolutely unreasonable to create a pretext for a split, or even for new difficulties in our relations with the brotherly [communist] parties in the West.

— Open letter to Brezhnev signed by twenty-five intellectuals

On February 14, 1966, twenty-five prominent Soviet intellectuals wrote an open letter to Leonid Brezhnev, then secretary general, asking not to rehabilitate Stalinism. Among them were the academicians Andrei Sakharov, Vitaly Ginzburg, Yakov Zeldovich, Mikhail Leontovich, Igor Tamm, Lev Artsimovich, Pyotr Kapitsa and Ivan Maysky, writers Konstantin Paustovsky and Viktor Nekrasov, composer Dmitri Shostakovich, actors Innokenty Smoktunovsky, Maya Plisetskaya, Oleg Yefremov and others. The letter was widely circulated in samizdat but was never published by the official press. Some of the signers suffered repercussions such as denial to travel abroad and restrictions to officially publish their work.

Several people, including Daniel's wife Larisa Bogoraz, sent independent letters in support of Sinyavsky and Daniel.

Vladimir Semichastny, the Chairman of the KGB, wrote the following in his notes:

Beginning in December 1965, speeches were held in Moscow in defense of Sinyavsky and Daniel and in memory of the victims of Stalinism. The participants demanded a revision of laws and certain articles of the Criminal Code, and the release from custody of distributors of anti-Soviet documents detained by the KGB.

The actions of the participants in the gatherings were not random. They were inspired and prepared by people who set out to discredit the Soviet system. Among them were Volpin, Yakir, Ginzburg, and others. Snegov, Henri, Petrovsky, Balter, Kosterin, Nekrich, Chukovskaya, as well as some scientists and cultural figures who signed a number of dubious documents, played an unseemly role in this matter. This group of 35-40 people produced and distributed anti-Soviet literature and held demonstrations. It was associated with the foreign anti-Soviet organization NTS, whose leaders sent direct instructions to individual members of this group.

In this regard, the Prosecutor's Office of the USSR and the KGB prosecuted the following: Ginzburg, Galanskov, Dobrovolsky, Lashkova, Radzievsky, Kushev, Khaustov, Bukovsky, Delaunay, and Gabay.

=== Dissident movement ===
Many members of the intelligentsia felt ambivalent towards the publication of works abroad, especially under a pseudonym. Nevertheless, many saw the Sinyavsky–Daniel case as a return to the show trials of the 1930s and a sign that the Brezhnev Politburo was preparing to reverse the gains of Khrushchev's de-Stalinization. Critics of the trial protested the harsh sentences meted out to Sinyavsky and Daniel and emphasized issues of creative freedom and the historical role of the writer in Russian society.

Others were troubled by the claims of the court that the trial was in full adherence to existing laws and rights guaranteed in the Soviet constitution. These concerns motivated the first unsanctioned public political demonstration in the Soviet Union after the Second World War. On Soviet Constitution Day, December 5, 1965, supporters of Sinyavsky and Daniel protested on Moscow's Pushkin Square with the call for a fair and open trial. Among the organizers of the demonstration were mathematician Alexander Esenin-Volpin, historian and poet Yuri Galanskov and student Vladimir Bukovsky. The demonstration became known as the "glasnost meeting" (митинг гласности). It became an annual event in Moscow, whose notable attendees included Andrei Sakharov.

The demonstration was followed by an increase in open protest and samizdat. In 1967, journalist Alexander Ginzburg was arrested for compiling a report on the trial known as The White Book. He was sentenced to five years in a labor camp. His trial in 1968 (Galanskov-Ginzburg trial) in itself became a landmark in the Soviet human rights movement.

Underground coverage of these and similar events ultimately led to the appearance of the samizdat civil rights periodical Chronicle of Current Events in April 1968.

The encounter with foreign journalists during the course of the trial also helped foster a type of dissident-journalist relationship which became increasingly important to the emerging dissident movement. Through such media organs as Radio Liberty, Voice of America, the BBC, and the Deutsche Welle, samizdat materials offered to and published by Western correspondents were rebroadcast into the Soviet Union and became available to segments of the Soviet population who had no other means of learning about the movement.

=== Political and legal consequences ===
The trial of Sinyavsky and Daniel was the first Soviet show trial during which writers were openly convicted solely for their literary work.

The trial brought to the end the period of Khrushchev's liberalism (Khrushchev Thaw), and helped to initiate the retrenchment associated with the Brezhnev's epoch (Brezhnev Stagnation). The further restrictions were achieved by an increase in arrests and persecutions as well as changes in the legal code itself. In September 1966 the Soviet legislature introduced several amendments to the RSFSR Criminal Code. Responding to the trial, in which the prosecution had found it difficult to prove the intent to do harm that was required by article 70, and to the public demonstration in support of Sinyavsky and Daniel, it added two subsections to Article 190:

- Article 190-1 made it a punishable offense to circulate statements defamatory of the Soviet system. In contrast to article 70, this offense did not stipulate any intention of subverting or weakening Soviet authority.
- Article 190-3 prohibited violation of public order by a group, either in coarse manner or in disobedience to legal demands of representatives of authority.

== See also ==
- Trial of the Four
