= Alexey Dobrovolsky =

Soviet-Russian dissident (1938–2013)

Alexey Alexandrovich Dobrovolsky
- Алексей Александрович Добровольский
- Alexey performing a Nazi salute against the background of the military flag of Nazi Germany
- Born: 13 October 1938; Moscow, Soviet Union
- Died: 19 May 2013 (aged 74); Vasenyovo, Kirov Oblast, Russia
- Other name: Dobroslav (Russian: Доброслав)
- Political party: National Alliance of Russian Solidarists, Pamyat
- Movement: Slavic neopaganism, neo-Nazism, national anarchism, antisemitism

Alexey Alexandrovich Dobrovolsky (Russian: Алексей Александрович Добровольский; 13 October 1938 – 19 May 2013), also known as Dobroslav (Russian: Доброслав), was a Soviet-Russian Slavic neopagan, a founder of Russian Rodnoverie, national anarchist, and neo-Nazi.

Dobrovolsky began his political activity in the 1950s–1960s as a member of the Soviet dissident movement and the National Alliance of Russian Solidarists. Later, having left both, he termed his ideology "Russian National Socialism". In the 1980s, he became the spiritual leader of the radical wing of Russian neopaganism and is characterized as an ideologue of Slavic neo-Nazism.

== Life ==
Dobrovolsky's father was a descendant of Zaporozhian Cossacks and studied at the Bauman Moscow State Technical University, and his mother was a native Muscovite and an engineer-economist.

Dobrovolsky grew up admiring Stalin and everything associated with him. From an early age, he participated in various dissident movements. After finishing secondary education, he attended the Moscow Institute of Culture but did not finish studies. He worked as a loader in the printing house of the Moskovskaya Pravda newspaper.

In 1956, Dobrovolsky left the Komsomol in protest against de-Stalinization. He later said, "I drew the wrong conclusions from the exposure of Stalin and gradually became an enemy of Soviet power." In December, inspired by the Hungarian Revolution, he formed the Russian National Socialist Party (RNSP) with some young workers at Moscow's defense plants, aiming to overthrow the communists and "revive the Russian nation". The group's members distributed leaflets with anti-Soviet and anti-communist slogans.

On 23 May 1958, Dobrovolsky was arrested along with his RNSP associates and subsequently sentenced to three years in prison. While in prison, he became friends with former collaborators, Nazis, associates of Pyotr Krasnov, Andrei Shkuro, and Andrey Vlasov, and members of the National Alliance of Russian Solidarists (NTS). Influenced by them, he became a monarchist while in serving his sentence. While serving in the Dubravny camps (Mordovia), he met S. R. Arsenyev-Hoffman, who had been a member of a secret Russian-German society before World War II.

Dobrovolsky was released in 1961. That same year, he was baptized by the dissident priest Gleb Yakunin. In 1964, he joined the Union of the Working People, an organization created by Boris Yevdokimov, a member of the NTS. In March, all four of its members were arrested. Dobrovolsky and Yevdokimov were declared mentally ill, and Dobrovolsky underwent psychiatric treatment for a year. In the psychiatric hospital, he met dissidents Vladimir Bukovsky and General Petro Grigorenko.

On 25 August 1965, Dobrovolsky was released from the hospital, and by autumn, the NTS had established contact with him; through him, it provided a duplicating machine to the dissident poet and NTS member Yuri Galanskov. In 1966, Dobrovolsky joined the NTS. Through him, Alexander Ginzburg's White Book (a collection of documents about the trial of Andrei Sinyavsky and Yuli Daniel) and the collection Phoenix-66 were transmitted to the West.

In 1967, Dobrovolsky was arrested again. At the trial, termed the Trial of the Four, he testified against himself and the other dissidents, resulting in his sentence being commuted to only two years in prison (while Galanskov received seven years and died in prison, and Ginzburg was sentenced to five years). Anatoly Krasnov-Levitin wrote in his memoirs: "The most sensational news was that of Alexey Dobrovolsky's capitulation. For a long time, no one wanted to believe it. With his manner — something between a White officer and a Narodnaya Volya hero — Dobrovolsky managed to inspire universal trust."

In January 1968, Pyotr Yakir, Yuliy Kim, and Ilya Gabay, calling Dobrovolsky "vile and cowardly" in their address To Figures of Science, Culture, and Art, wrote:

The life of Alexey Dobrovolsky, who played the sinister Kostomarov-like role in this trial, has also been tarnished. If he has even a shred of conscience, thirty pieces of silver (a two-year sentence) is too little compensation for the contempt and rejection that await this slanderer. The stigma of the scoundrel who doomed his comrades, slandering them out of base interests, for this moral deformity of Dobrovolsky our punitive organs bear a large measure of responsibility.

In early 1969, Dobrovolsky was released. He lived in Uglich and Alexandrov. In 1972, he again received a residence permit in Moscow. During this time, he became interested in the occult and Slavic paganism.

In 1986, Dobrovolsky left Moscow for Pushchino, where he practiced folk medicine.

With the onset of Perestroika in the second half of the 1980s, Dobrovolsky joined the far-right association Pamyat; there, he entered into a dispute with its leader, Dmitry Vasilyev, over religious issues. As Orthodox sentiments prevailed in Pamyat, by late 1987, Dobrovolsky and a group of his neo-pagan followers joined the Pamyat World Anti-Zionist and Anti-Masonic Front, which was headed by Valery Yemelyanov ("Velemir").

In 1989, Dobrovolsky participated in the founding of the Moscow Slavic Pagan Community, led by Alexander Belov ("Selidor"). He adopted the pagan name Dobroslav. At this time, he actively gave lectures organized by Konstantin Smirnov-Ostashvili, the leader of the Pamyat Union for National Proportional Representation. Dobrovolsky actively participated in right-wing nationalist rallies. In 1990, he collaborated with Viktor Korchagin's Russian Party. In the same year, Belov expelled Yemelyanov and his supporters, including Dobrovolsky, from the Moscow Slavic Pagan Community for political radicalism.

In the early 1990s, Dobrovolsky retired to the village of Vasenyovo, Kirov Oblast, from where he continued to work in the neo-pagan community, performing naming ceremonies and organizing neo-pagan festivals; the latter often involved heavy alcohol consumption and destruction of icons. In Vasenyovo, he founded a neo-pagan community primarily consisting mainly of his family members. One of his sons, Alexander, received the pagan name Vyatich. In 1993–1995, Dobroslav gave lectures at the House of Political Education in Kirov.

In 1994, Dobrovolsky attempted to create a political organization, the Russian National Liberation Movement, an idea his student A. M. Aratov later also unsuccessfully attempted to realize. On 22 June 1997, Dobrovolsky convened the Veche Unification Congress of Pagan Communities, which proclaimed him the leader of the "Russian Liberation Movement". He later came into conflict with the Russkaya Pravda publishing house, who had previously actively disseminated his ideas. Aratov expelled Dobroslav's son Sergei (Rodostav) from the Russkaya Pravda editorial board for drunkenness.

In July 1999, Dobrovolsky was elected Supreme Volkhv of the Union of Slavic Native Belief Communities (led by Vadim Kazakov from Kaluga).

The cultural and historical society Yarilo's Arrows, founded by Dobrovolsky's followers, disbanded in the early 2000s, as Dobroslav no longer wished to lead it.

In March 2001, Dobrovolsky's son Sergei was elected head of the Shabalinsky District Administration. In the early 2000s, Dobroslav focused on developing pagan ideology. He visited Moscow several times to give lectures.

On 23 April 2001, the Shabalinsky District Court heard a case against Dobrovolsky, who was accused of inciting antisemitism and religious hatred. The local communist newspaper, Kirovskaya Pravda, supported him. On 1 March 2002, the case was heard in the Svechinsky District Court of Kirov, where Dobrovolsky was given a suspended sentence of two years.

In March, May, and July 2005, various district courts in Kirov deemed a number of Dobrovolsky's brochures extremist. In 2007, these brochures were added to the Federal List of Extremist Materials (No. 6-10) compiled by Rosreestr.

Dobrovolsky died on 19 May 2013. His body was burned on a large bonfire in imitation of an ancient Slavic funeral rite.

== Views and thought ==
According to Dobrovolsky himself and those who knew him, Nazi ideas, coupled with Nazi symbolism and aesthetics, made a profound impression on him in the 1960s. He began dreaming of the total extermination of the Jews. Dobrovolsky's new friends, Nazis and collaborators, convinced him that the Americans themselves had built gas chambers in order to frame the Nazis for genocide. From S. R. Arsenyev-Hoffman, Dobrovolsky first learned about the "faith of the ancestors" and the role of the "Nordic race". Later, in 1969, after purchasing a library of rare books, he became fascinated with paganism and the occult and became a follower of Helena Blavatsky's Theosophy.

The historian and religious scholar Roman Shizhensky identified common, and in some places completely identical, points in the concepts of Dobrovolsky and Nazi ideologist Hermann Wirth, the first leader of the Ahnenerbe, whose work The Oera Linda Chronicle (1933) Dobrovolsky presumably used as a source. Dobrovolsky's historical and mythological concepts contain notions of time and its attributes similar to Wirth's: nature and the universe abound with "revolving spheres" and "a succession of perfectly coordinated cycles". He views the beauty of nature as the beauty of a mature, self-contained being, which exists in eternal rotation. Following Wirth, Dobrovolsky believed the north to be the original habitat of the "Aryans": "Vague notions and archaic beliefs about the Northern Homeland have been preserved by many Indo-European peoples… All these legends are genetically linked and trace back to a single archetype, which, taken as a whole, can be conventionally called the 'Legend of the Nordic Homeland'."

Wirth and Dobrovolsky believed that Atlantis and Thule were the names of the same continent or archipelago — in Dobrovolsky’s words, the “ancestral hearth” of the “Aryan” peoples. Wirth and Dobrovolsky believed in a mythical golden age characterized as the era of matriarchy. Dobrovolsky viewed women as divinely chosen, keepers of ancestral memory: “The Mother was more of a deity than a superior… all family and social life was built around her. A woman is the head of the clan, the keeper of the hearth, the guardian of clan customs and traditions, the performer of sacred rites. She is also the heir to witchcraft knowledge and the intermediary with the spirit world, for as a woman, she is genetically endowed with a heightened intuitive sensitivity to occult influences...".

Like Wirth, Dobrovolsky considered the transfer of power from women to men and the era of patriarchy a regression. The foundation of Dobrovolsky's religious doctrine is the idea of the Slavic god of fertility Yarilo (whom Dobrovolsky associates with the sun) as the most ancient deity. According to Dobrovolsky, the Slavs worshiped the solar disk itself. The deities who later relegated Yarilo to the background already possessed an unnatural anthropomorphic appearance: "these are already gods of the sun, and not the sun god." The foundation of Dobrovolsky's doctrine is solar monotheism or henotheism. This idea of primordial monotheism corresponds to Wirth's concept of "polar, solar monotheism". Dobrovolsky compiled a calendar of major holidays associated with the sun: "According to the pagan worldview, the driving force of the rotation of the wheel is Yarilo — the Sun."

Dobrovolsky represented the "national socialist" wing of Rodnoverie and enjoyed great authority among Russian far-right nationalists. He prided himself on his lack of higher education since, like Adolf Hitler, he believed that "education cripples a person." In his view, science was at a dead end and "brings nothing but misfortune". Dobrovolsky referred to himself and his followers as "bearers of light" and the "healthy forces of the nation".

Dobrovolsky declared himself a supporter of "pagan socialism". He derived "Russian spirituality" directly from "Slavic heritage," closely linked to the native soil. He interpreted the concept of blood and soil literally, believing that a powerful material force emanates from the graves of ancestors and influences the destinies of the living. He considered the highest value not individual Slavs or Russians, but the Russian community. He alleged that in the pre-Christian period, the Slavs had no armies separate from the common people. Dobrovolsky traced his concept to "Russian natural peasant socialism," which supposedly included complete social equality, egalitarian division of property, voluntary self-restraint, and a rejection of private property.

Borrowing the idea of vegetarianism from esoteric teachings, Dobrovolsky believed that the harmonious relationship between humans and animals was first undermined by the introduction of cattle breeding. He blamed the domestication of animals on the "Semito-Hamites," who came from Atlantis and invented blood sacrifice. He considered the Jews a qualitatively different civilization, experiencing absolute hostility toward nature, unlike all the “native peoples” of the world. To him, the Bible, supposedly portrays nature not as a "nurturant mother," but as an unfeeling material shell. He called Jews parasites and fully justified Jewish pogroms as "necessary popular self-defense".

Dobrovolsky considered the "Judeo-Christian alienation from nature" and "the church's justification of social inequality" unacceptable. He wrote of the "unnatural miscegenation of races" as a crime and blamed it on "international Judeo-Christianity". He viewed the Slavs as a distinct race suffering racial oppression at the hands of the "chosen people". In line with German Nazism, he contrasted "two mutually exclusive worldviews: solar affirmation of life and pernicious obscurantism". He replaced "Aryans" and "Semites" with Slavs and hybrid "Judeo-Christians": for him, the former were honest and sincere, while the latter were deceitful and treacherous. At the same time, he borrowed the idea of the "Synagogue of Satan" from Christian antisemitism, associating it with the pentagram, supposedly a symbol of evil and Freemasonry. To him, the pagan Slavs were peace-loving until Prince Vladimir allegedly introduced the custom of human sacrifice, while Christians are distinguished by their bloodthirstiness; Dobrovolsky traced the roots of this to "biblical punitive wars against the indigenous peoples of Palestine". He asserted that "the misanthropic racism of the 'chosen' Jews served as a model for Christian racism — for the extermination of entire indigenous peoples."

Monotheism, according to Dobrovolsky, contributed to the strengthening of princely and royal power and ultimately led to serfdom. In his view, the civil war that divided the people into nobility and commoners began not in 1918, but in 988. Further, the church committed a terrible betrayal of national interests by forming an alliance with the Tatars, which allegedly helped it gain strength. He denied that activities of Sergius of Radonezh were patriotic and tried to prove that the Russians defeated Mamai not with the support of the church, but in spite of it.

In keeping with his views, Dobrovolsky identified particular historical figures as the antagonists of Russian history. The central place in this list was given to Prince Vladimir Svyatoslavich. Dobrovolsky developed one of the most ideologically fundamental Russian neo-pagan myths: that of the Jewish-Khazar origins of Prince Vladimir, blaming this for the Christianization of Kievan Rusʹ, as Christianity is allegedly a tool for the enslavement of the "Aryans" by the Jews. He borrowed this idea from the book Dezionization by Valery Yemelyanov, another one of the founders of Russian neo-paganism. Dobrovolsky repeated the first part of this myth unchanged: Vladimir was the son of Prince Svyatoslav by Malusha, the housekeeper of his mother, Princess Olga. Yemelyanov and Dobrovolsky claimed that the name Malusha is derived from the Hebrew name Malka. They asserted that Malusha's father was a "rabbi" who bore the Hebrew name Malk and was a descendant of the Khazar Jews. Dobrovolsky supplemented the second part of this myth with new details. He considered Byzantium to be the main culprit in the introduction of Christianity to Rus'. According to him, Vladimir introduced an inquisition and propagandized alcoholism, which emerged during his reign. Vladimir's reign resulted in the spiritual disarmament of the Slavs, a decline in their numbers, and their inability to resist the Mongol-Tatar hordes.

Dobrovolsky did not believe in Perun and other gods, believing that his ancestors believed not in gods, but in spirits and revered their lineage. According to him, the statues of Perun and other gods were erected in Kiev during Vladimir's reign at the instigation of the Jews, in order to discredit paganism through bloody sacrifices and prepare the people for the introduction of Christianity.

Capitalism, according to Dobrovolsky, is "a monstrous offspring of Judeo-Christianity" and a "Western plutocracy resulting from the internal development of Judeo-Christianity": "capitalism and conscience are incompatible." Thus, modern industrial society has brought the world to the brink of environmental disaster, for which Nature will take its cruel revenge. Like the Nazis, he believed that city dwellers had betrayed national values and became bourgeois. But contrary to the Nazis, he saw the Russian Revolution as an uprising of the village against the city and "Russian truth against Judeo-Christian falsehood". He called Bolshevism "an element of the Russian soul" and contrasted it with Marxism. Declaring the Russian Revolution "an attempt to return to our natural, independent path," he revived concepts such as national bolshevism and Eurasianism, popular in the 1920s among some white Russian émigrés. Dobrovolsky called for an alliance between nationalists and "communist patriots" in the name of building "Russian national socialism".

Dobrovolsky saw salvation for the Slavs in "a return to the very core of the bright pagan worldview — to the highly moral principles of the ancients, primarily in relation to Mother Nature". He declared an uncompromising war on the "Jewish yoke" and predicted an imminent Russian revolt against it. He wrote that Yarilo the Sun would soon consume those most sensitive to increased ultraviolet radiation, a trait which he attributed primarily to the Jews. The destruction of the "Judeo-Christian" world, he believed, would usher in "our new era". Only the "new people," the sun-worshipers, would survive.

Dobrovolsky is thought to be one of two probable authors of the "kolovrat" symbol; the other author could have been Vadim Kazakov, with whom Dobrovolsky communicated, including on this issue. The symbol's creation dates back to approximately 1994. In 1994, Dobrovolsky drew the symbol in his letters. In the same year, Kazakov's Imenoslov was published, featuring the "kolovrat" in gold on a red background. Despite these thoughts, the Kolovrat (titled as Slonechko) can be originally seen in a woodcut made by Stanislaw Jakubowski, having published his art in the 1923 book 'Prasłowiańskie Motywa Architektoniczne', years before Dobrovolsky was born.

Dobrovolsky introduced the eight-pointed "kolovrat" as a symbol of "resurgent paganism". According to Roman Shizhensky, Dobrovolsky took the meaning of the swastika from the work of Nazi ideologue Herman Wirth. The primary pagan symbol that Dobrovolsky determined - the eight-pointed gammadion (swastika) within a circle - was originally proposed and, presumably, created by Wirth, who interpreted it as the most ancient. Dobrovolsky declared this eight-pointed "kolovrat", supposedly a pagan solar symbol consisting of two superimposed swastikas, to be the symbol of an uncompromising "national liberation struggle" against the "Jewish yoke". According to him, the meaning of the "kolovrat" completely corresponds to the meaning of the Nazi swastika. The eight-pointed "kolovrat" appears in many of Dobrovolsky's publications.

== Legacy ==
Dobrovolsky's ideas had a significant influence on Russian Rodnoverie. Most of his ideas have become commonplace in Rodnoverie. Though many of these ideas were developed by earlier neopagans, Dobrovolsky popularized them for subsequent generation. These ideas include the concept of the clan system as "Aryan" socialism (national socialism); the opposition of Slavs and "Judeo-Christians"; various antisemitic ideas, including the introduction of blood sacrifices by Jews and the anti-natural activities and "racism" of the Old Testament and modern Jews; the treacherous activities of Prince Vladimir in introducing Christianity; and the imminent advent of a new era (the Age of Aquarius), favorable to the Slavs and destructive to their enemies.

Dobrovolsky's idea of an alliance between nationalists and "communist patriots" became the basis for some neopagans' desire for an alliance with "nationally-oriented" communists.

As an ideologue of Slavic neo-Nazism, many prominent neopagans, including extremists, came to Dobrovolsky for initiation and "blessing".

Dobrovolsky's follower A. M. Aratov, director of the Russkaya Pravda publishing house, wrote about the advent of the "Era of Russia" and the imminent end of Christianity and Judaism.
