= Petro Grigorenko =

Soviet Ukrainian military official, writer, and human rights activist

- Петро Григоренко; Petro Hryhorenko
- Born: Petro Hryhorovych Hryhorenko; 16 October [O.S. 3 October] 1907; Borysivka, Taurida Governorate, Russian Empire
- Died: 21 February 1987 (aged 79); New York City, New York, United States
- Burial place: St. Andrew Memorial Church in South Bound Brook, New Jersey, United States
- Citizenship: Russian Empire (1907–17); Ukrainian People's Republic (1917–1918); Soviet Ukraine (1918–22); Soviet Union (1922–77); United States (1977–87)
- Education: Kharkiv Polytechnic Institute; Military Engineering-Technical University; Kuybyshev Military Engineering Academy; Military Academy of the General Staff of the Armed Forces of Russia
- Occupations: commanding officer, military scientist, cyberneticist
- Employer: Frunze Military Academy
- Known for: human rights activism with participation in the Moscow Helsinki Group, the Ukrainian Helsinki Group, the Working Commission to Investigate the Use of Psychiatry for Political Purposes, struggle against political abuse of psychiatry in the Soviet Union
- Political party: Bolshevik
- Movement: dissident movement in the Soviet Union
- Spouse: Zinaida Hryhorenko
- Children: 5
- Military career
- Allegiance: Soviet Union
- Branch: Red Army
- Service years: 1939–1945
- Rank: Major General
- Conflicts: Battles of Khalkhin Gol; Second World War
- Awards: Order of Lenin; Order For Courage 1st class
- Website: www.grigorenko.org

Petro Grigorenko or Petro Hryhorovych Hryhorenko (Ukrainian: Петро́ Григо́рович Григоре́нко, 16 October [O.S. 3 October] 1907 – 21 February 1987) was a high-ranking Soviet Army commander of Ukrainian descent, who in his fifties became a dissident and a writer, one of the founders of the human rights movement in the Soviet Union.

For 16 years, he was a professor of cybernetics at the Frunze Military Academy and chairman of its cybernetic section before joining the ranks of the early dissidents. In the mid-1970s Grigorenko helped to found the Moscow Helsinki Group and the Ukrainian Helsinki Group, before leaving the USSR for medical treatment in the United States. The Soviet government barred his return, and he never again returned to the Soviet Union. In the words of Joseph Alsop, Grigorenko publicly denounced the "totalitarianism that hides behind the mask of so-called Soviet democracy."

== Early life ==
Petro Grigorenko was born in Borysivka village in Taurida Governorate, Russian Empire (in present-day Zaporizhzhia Oblast, Ukraine).

In 1939, he graduated with honors from the Kuybyshev Military Engineering Academy and the Military Academy of the General Staff of the Armed Forces of Russia. He took part in the battles of Khalkhin Gol, against the Japanese on the Manchurian border in 1939, and in the Second World War. He commanded troops in initial battles following 22 June 1941. During the war, he also commanded an infantry division in the Baltic for three years.

He went on a military career and reached high ranks during World War II. After the war, being a decorated veteran, he left active career and taught at the Frunze Military Academy, reaching the rank of a Major General.

In 1949, Grigorenko defended his Ph.D. thesis on the theme "Features of the organization and conduct of combined offensive battle in the mountains."

In 1960, he completed work on his doctoral thesis. Over 70 of his scientific works on military science were published.

== Dissident activities ==
In 1961, Petro Grigorenko started to openly criticize what he considered the excesses of the Khrushchev regime. He maintained that the special privileges of the political elite did not comply with the principles laid down by Lenin. Grigorenko formed a dissident group—The Group for the Struggle to Revive Leninism. Soviet psychiatrists sitting as legally constituted commissions to inquire into his sanity diagnosed him at least three times—in April 1964, August 1969, and November 1969. When arrested, Grigorenko was sent to Moscow's Lubyanka prison, and from there for psychiatric examination to the Serbsky Institute where the first commission, which included Snezhnevsky and Lunts, diagnosed him as suffering from the mental disease in the form of a paranoid delusional development of his personality, accompanied by early signs of cerebral arteriosclerosis. Lunts, reporting later on this diagnosis, mentioned that the symptoms of paranoid development were "an overestimation of his own personality reaching messianic proportions" and "reformist ideas." Grigorenko was thereby forcibly committed to a special psychiatric hospital. After six months, Grigorenko was found to be in remission and was released for outpatient follow-up. After the release, his pension was severely reduced.

Grigorenko took part in the defense of Andrei Sinyavsky and Yuli Daniel and sharply protested against the arrests of young writers Alexander Ginzburg, Yuri Galanskov, Alexey Dobrovolsky, and others. During the closed political trials of 1965–1969, he was often present at the courthouses, demanding to open the doors of the courtrooms for everyone, explained to the people gathered around the goals of the defendants, expressed his dissatisfaction with the distortions in the internal political life of the country, and demanded a return to "true Leninism".

He became much more active in his dissidence, stirred other people to protest some of the State's actions and received several warnings from the KGB. In 1968, after Grigorenko protested the Soviet invasion of Czechoslovakia, he was expelled from the Communist Party of the Soviet Union, arrested and ultimately committed to a mental hospital until being freed on 26 June 1974 after 5 years of detention. As Grigorenko had followers in Moscow, he was lured to the far-away Tashkent. While there, he was again arrested and examined by a psychiatric team. None of the manifestations or symptoms cited by the Lunts commission were found there by the second examination conducted under the chairmanship of Fyodor Detengof. The diagnosis and evaluation made by the commission was that "Grigorenko's [criminal] activity had a purposeful character, it was related to concrete events and facts... It did not reveal any signs of illness or delusions." The psychiatrists reported that he was not mentally sick, but responsible for his actions. He had firm convictions which were shared by many of his colleagues and were not delusional. Having evaluated the records of his preceding hospitalization, they concluded that he had not been sick at that time either. The KGB brought Grigorenko back to Moscow and, three months later, arranged a second examination at the Serbsky Institute. Once again, these psychiatrists found that he had "a paranoid development of the personality" manifested by reformist ideas. The commission, which included Lunts and was chaired by Morozov, recommended that he be recommitted to a special psychiatric hospital for the socially dangerous. Eventually, after almost four years, he was transferred to a regular mental hospital. On 17 January 1971 Grigorenko was asked whether he had changed his convictions and replied that "Convictions are not like gloves, one cannot easily change them".

In 1971, Dr. Semen Hluzman wrote an in-absentia psychiatric report on Grigorenko. Hluzman came to the conclusion that Grigorenko was mentally sane and had been taken to mental hospitals for political reasons. In the late 1970s and early 1980s, Hluzman was forced to serve seven years in labor camp for defending Grigorenko against the charge of insanity. Amnesty International declared Grigorenko a prisoner of conscience.

Grigorenko became the key defender of Crimean Tatars deported to Soviet Central Asia. He advised the Tatar activists not to confine their protests to the USSR, but to appeal also to international organizations including the United Nations.

Grigorenko was one of the first who questioned the official Soviet version of World War II history. He pointed out that just prior to the German attack on June 22, 1941, vast Soviet troops were concentrated in the area west of Białystok, deep in occupied Poland, getting ready for a surprise offensive, which made them vulnerable to be encircled in case of surprise German attack. His ideas were later advanced by Viktor Suvorov.

After publishing Abdurakhman Avtorkhanov's book Stalin and the Soviet Communist Party: A Study in the Technology of Power, Grigorenko made and distributed its copies by photographing and typewriting. In 1976, Grigorenko helped found the Moscow Helsinki Group and the Ukrainian Helsinki Group.

== In the United States ==
On 20 December 1977, Grigorenko was allowed to go abroad for medical treatment. His health was ruined during forcible confinement in KGB-run mental hospitals. On 30 November 1977, Grigorenko arrived in the United States and was stripped of his Soviet citizenship. In Grigorenko's words, Leonid Brezhnev signed the decree of depriving Grigorenko of Soviet citizenship on the ground that he was undermining the prestige of the Soviet Union. The 1970s marked a peak in the use of external exile as a punitive measure by the Soviet Union (as opposed to the internal type, which was highest between the mid-1930s and early 1950s); often the pattern was that a trip abroad for work or medical treatment was transformed into permanent exile. In the same year, Grigorenko became a U.S. citizen.

Monument at Petro Grigorenko's grave. Cemetery of the Ukrainian Orthodox Church of St. Andrew in South Bound Brook, New Jersey

Being in USA since 1977, Grigorenko took an active part in the activities of the Ukrainian Helsinki Group foreign affiliate. On 23 July 1978, Grigorenko made a statement condemning the trials of Soviet dissidents Anatoliy Shcharanskyi, Alexander Ginzburg and Viktoras Petkus.

In 1979 in New York, Grigorenko was examined by the team of psychologists and psychiatrists including Alan A. Stone, the then President of American Psychiatric Association. The team could find no evidence of mental disease in Grigorenko and his history consistent with mental disease in the past. Their findings were drawn up and publicized by Walter Reich. Grigorenko's case confirmed accusations, Stone wrote, that psychiatry in the Soviet Union was at times a tool of political repression.

Petro Grigorenko described his life and views, and his assessment by Soviet psychiatrists and periods of incarceration in prison hospitals in his 1981 memoirs V Podpolye Mozhno Vstretit Tolko Krys… (In the Underground One Can Meet Only Rats…). In 1982, the book was translated into English by Thomas P. Whitney under the title Memoirs and reviewed by Alexander J. Motyl, Raymond L. Garthoff, John C. Campbell, Adam Ulam, Raisa Orlova and Lev Kopelev.

In 1983, he said he considered the American political-economic system to be "the best that mankind has found to date." In 1983, a stroke he suffered left him partially paralyzed. Grigorenko died on 21 February 1987 in New York City.

In 1991, a commission, composed of psychiatrists from all over the Soviet Union and led by Modest Kabanov, then director of the Bekhterev Psychoneurological Institute in St Petersburg, spent six months reviewing Grigorenko's patient files. They drew up 29 thick volumes of legal proceedings, and in October 1991 reversed the official Soviet diagnosis of Grigorenko's psychiatric condition. In 1992, an official post-mortem forensic psychiatric commission of experts met in Ukraine. They removed the stigma of being a mental patient and confirmed that there were no grounds for the debilitating treatment he underwent in high security psychiatric hospitals for many years. The 1992 psychiatric examination of Grigorenko was described by the Nezavisimiy Psikhiatricheskiy Zhurnal in its numbers 1–4 of 1992.

== Family ==
Petro Grigorenko was married to Zinaida Mikhailovna Grigorenko and they had five sons: Anatoliy, Heorhiy, Oleh, Viktor and Andrew. Two of them died as children.

In 1975, Andrew, an electrical engineer, was declared to have inherited his father's insanity. He was expelled from the USSR to the US, two years before Petro and Zinaida Hryhorenko themselves travelled to the United States. Andrew was repeatedly told that since his father was mentally ill, then he was also mad. If he did not stop speaking out in defense of human rights and his father, they told him, he would also be sent to the psikhushka. Subsequently, Andrew Grigorenko became the founder and president of General Petro Grigorenko Foundation, dedicated to the study of his father's legacy.

== Name spelling versions ==
The different Latin spellings of Grigorenko's name exist due to the lack of uniform transliteration rules for the Ukrainian names in the middle of the 20th century, when he became internationally known. The correct modern transliteration would be Petro Hryhorenko. However, according to the American identification documents of the late general the official spelling of his name was established as Petro Grigorenko. The same spelling is engraved on his gravestone at the Ukrainian Orthodox Church of St. Andrew in South Bound Brook, New Jersey, USA. The same spelling is also retained by his surviving American descendants: son Andrew and granddaughters Tetiana and Olga.

== Honours and awards ==
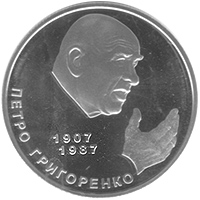
Commemorative coin issued by the National Bank of Ukraine in Grigorenko's honor

Soviet Union

Order of Lenin
Order of the Red Banner, twice
Order of the Red Star
Order of the Patriotic War, 1st class
Medal for Battle Merit
Medal "For the Victory over Germany in the Great Patriotic War 1941–1945"
Jubilee Medal "Twenty Years of Victory in the Great Patriotic War 1941–1945"
Jubilee Medal "Thirty Years of Victory in the Great Patriotic War 1941–1945"
Jubilee Medal "30 Years of the Soviet Army and Navy"
Jubilee Medal "40 Years of the Armed Forces of the USSR"
Jubilee Medal "50 Years of the Armed Forces of the USSR"

Ukraine

Order For Courage, 1st class

In Kharkiv the local Georgy Zhukov Avenue was renamed to Petro Hryhorenko Avenue to comply with decommunization laws (this was several times undone by the Kharkiv City Council).

== Books, interviews, letters ==
- Grigorenko, Piotr; Janin, Michel (November 1969). "La foi suffit" [Enough faith]. Esprit (in French). 386 (11): 685–691. JSTOR 24261436.
- Nekritsch, Alexander; Grigorenko, Pjotr (1969). Genickschuß : Die Rote Armee am 22. Juni 1941 [Shot in the neck: the Red Army on 22 June 1941] (in German). Wien, Frankfurt am Main, Zürich: Europa Verlag. ASIN B002PNH7C4.
- Grigorenko, Pjotr (1969). Der sowjetische Zusammenbruch 1941 [The Soviet collapse in 1941] (in German). Frankfurt am Main: Possev-Verlag.
- Grigorenko, Pjotr (1970). Aufzeichnungen aus Gefängnis und Irrenhaus [Notes from prison and madhouse] (in German). Bern: Kuratorium Geistige Freiheit.
- Grigorenko, Pyotr (Autumn 1970). "Diary". Survey: 181–187.
- Grigorenko, Pyotr [Пётр Григоренко] (1970). "О специальных психиатрических больницах (дурдомах)" [On special psychiatric hospitals ("madhouses")]. In Gorbanevskaya, Natalia [Наталья Горбаневская] (ed.). Полдень: Дело о демонстрации 25 августа 1968 года на Красной площади [Noon: The case on the demonstration of 25 August 1968 at the Red Square] (in Russian). Frankfurt-on-Main: Посев [Seeding]. pp. 461–473.
- Григоренко, Пётр (1970). Сокрытие исторической правды — преступление перед народом: письмо в редакцию журнала "Вопросы истории КПСС" [The concealment of the historical truth is a crime before people: a letter to the editorial staff of the journal The Issues related to the History of the CPSU] (in Russian). Издательство союза борьбы за освобождение народов России. (publicly available unabridged Russian text)
- Григоренко, Пётр (1973). Мысли сумасшедшего: Избранные письма и выступления Петра Григорьевича Григоренко [Thoughts of a madman: collected letters and appearances by Pyotr Grigoryevich Grigorenko] (in Russian). Амстердам: Фонд имени Герцена. (publicly available unabridged Russian text)
- Grigorenko, Petr (1976). The Grigorenko papers: writings by General P.G. Grigorenko and documents on his case. Colorado: Westview Press. ISBN 978-0-89158-603-6.
- Григоренко, Пётр (1977). Сборник статей [The collection of articles] (in Russian). Нью-Йорк: Издательство "Хроника". (publicly available unabridged Russian text)
- Григоренко, Пётр (1978). Наши будни или рассказ о том, как фабрикуются уголовные дела на советских граждан, выступающих в защиту прав человека [Our weekdays or a story about how criminal cases are fabricated on Soviet citizens who advocate human rights] (in Russian). Сучаснисть.
- Alexeyeva, Lyudmila; Grigorenko, Pyotr; Amalrik, Andrei; Kaminskaya, Dina; Simes, Konstantin; Williams, Nikolai; Litvinov, Pavel; Litvinova, Maya; Sadomskaya, Natalya; Chalidze, Valery; Shragin, Boris; Stain, Yuri (2013) [1978]. "В защиту Анатолия Марченко" [In defense of Anatoly Marchenko]. Kontinent (in Russian). 152.
- Григоренко, Пётр (2012) [1978]. "По поводу "раскаяния" Гелия Снегирева" [As regards Heliy Snegirev's "repentance"]. Kontinent (in Russian) (151).
- "Интервью с Петром Григорьевичем Григоренко" [Interview with Pyotr Grigoryevich Grigorenko]. Kontinent (in Russian) (152). 2013 [1978].
- "Gen. Grigorenko condemns trials (a statement by Gen. Petro Grigorenko condemning the trials of Soviet dissidents Anatoly Shcharansky, Aleksandr Ginzburg and Viktoras Petkus)" (PDF). The Ukrainian Weekly. Vol. LXXXV, no. 165. 23 July 1978. p. 2.
- Grigorenko, Petro; Nahaylo, Bohdan (January 1979). "My friend Mykola Rudenko". Index on Censorship. 8 (1): 33–40. doi:10.1080/03064227908532879.
- Grigorenko, Pjotr (1980). "Kann das Kaninchen sich retten? Anmerkungen zur KSZE-Konferenz in Madrid" [Can the rabbit save itself? Comments on the CSCE Conference in Madrid]. Die Politische Meinung (in German). 25 (192): 55–62.
- Григоренко, Пётр (2013) [1980]. "К вопросу о государственной независимости и взаимоотношениях между народами СССР" [Towards state independence and mutual relations between peoples of the USSR]. Kontinent (in Russian) (152).
- "Cambio 16, Spanish magazine, interviews Gen. Petro Grigorenko" (PDF). The Ukrainian Weekly. Vol. LXXXVII, no. 18. 28 September 1980. p. 2.
- Григоренко, Пётр (1981). В подполье можно встретить только крыс… [In underground one can meet only rats…] (in Russian). Нью-Йорк: Детинец. (publicly available unabridged Russian text)
- Grigorenko, Petr (1982). Memoirs (translated by Thomas P. Whitney). New York: Norton. ISBN 978-0-393-01570-6.
- Aksenov, Vasily; Etkind, Efim; Grigorenko, Pyotr; Grigorenko, Zinaida; Kopelev, Lev; Litvinov, Pavel; Litvinov, Maya; Mihajlov, Mihajlo; Proffer, Carl; Proffer, Ellendea; Synyavsky, Andrey; Shraginet, Boris; et al. (4 February 1982). "Help the Poles". The New York Review of Books. 29 (1).
- Grigorenko, Petro (January 1982). "Diplomatic delusions: a leading Soviet dissident unmasks the hypocrisy of Helsinki". Reason: 39–41.
- "Письма П.Г. Григоренко из Черняховской специальной психиатрической больницы" [Letters by P.G. Grigorenko from the Chernyakhovsk special psychiatric hospital]. Новый журнал (in Russian) (260). 2010.

== Video ==
- "De l'armée du Tsar à l'Armée rouge, interview de Piotr Grigorenko par Bernard Pivot pour l'émission Apostrophes" [On the Czar's army in the Red Army, interview by Pyotr Grigorenko to Bernard Pivot for broadcasting Apostrophes] (in French). 25 April 1980.
- "Генерал Петр Григоренко" [General Pyotr Grigorenko] (in Russian). ATR. 2012.
