= Samizdat =

Underground publications in the Soviet bloc

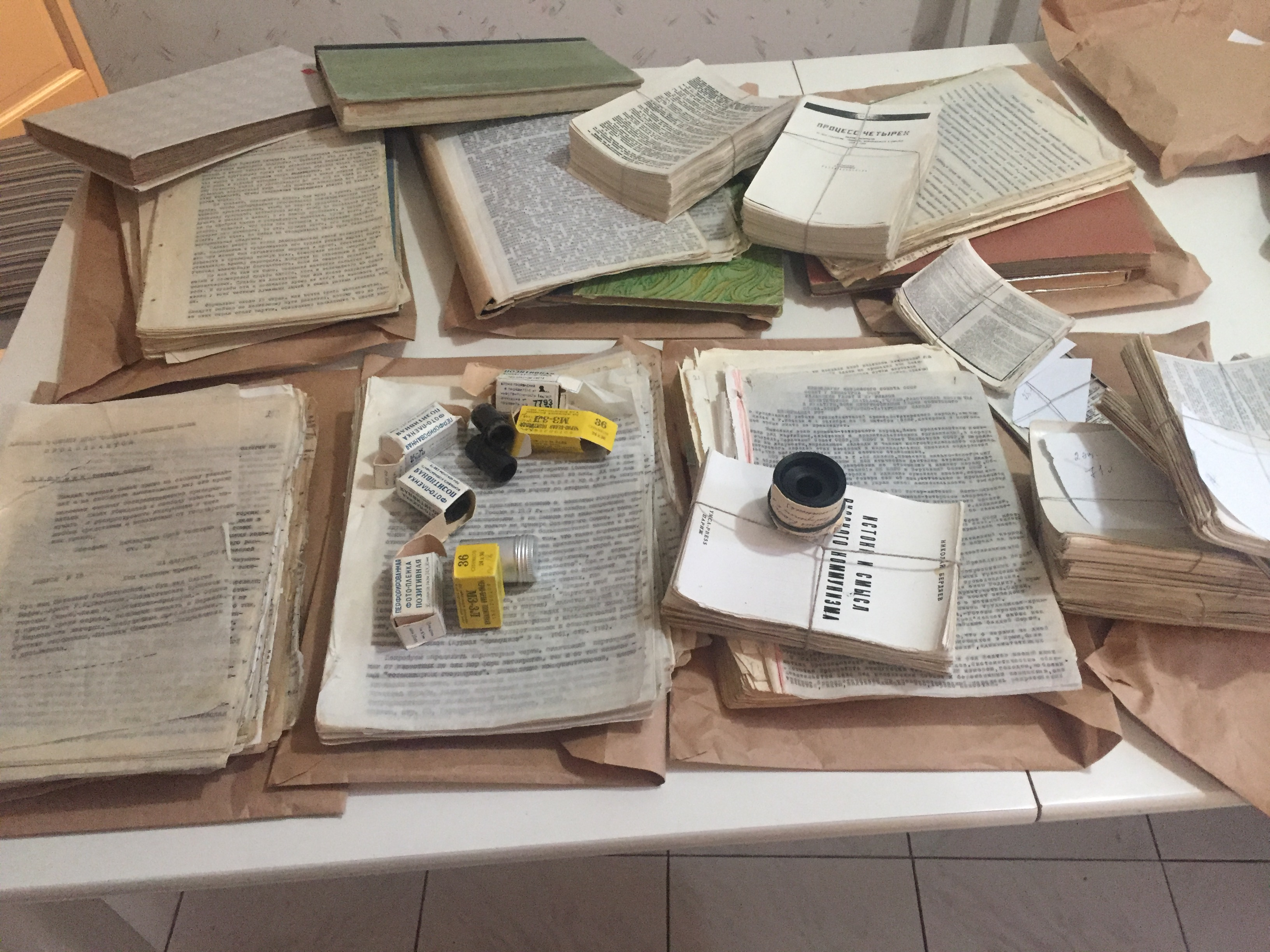
- Russian samizdat and photo negatives of unofficial literature
- Russian: самиздат
- Romanization: samizdat
- Literal meaning: self-publishing

Samizdat (Russian: самиздат, pronounced [səmɨzˈdat], lit. 'self-publishing'), also samvydav (Ukrainian: самвидав), was a form of dissident activity across the Eastern Bloc in which individuals reproduced censored and underground makeshift publications, often by hand, and passed the documents from reader to reader. The practice of manual reproduction was widespread, because printed texts could be traced back to the source. This was a grassroots practice used to evade official Soviet censorship.

== Name origin and variations ==
Etymologically, the word samizdat derives from sam (сам 'self, by oneself') and izdat (издат, an abbreviation of издательство, izdatel′stvo 'publishing house'), and thus means 'self-published'. Ukrainian has a similar term: samvydav (самвидав, pronounced [sɑmʋɪˈdɑu̯]), from sam 'self' and vydavnytstvo 'publishing house'.

The term "samvydav" originated thanks to the efforts of Ukrainian writer Ivan Bahrianyi, who published the poem "Ave Maria" as a book in 1929. His acquaintances, printers from Okhtyrka, printed 1,200 copies of the poem overnight at the author's expense.

The Russian poet Nikolay Glazkov coined a version of the term as a pun in the 1940s when he typed copies of his poems and included the note Samsebyaizdat (Самсебяиздат, "Myself by Myself Publishers") on the front page.

Tamizdat refers to literature published abroad (там, tam 'there'), often from smuggled manuscripts.

The Polish term for this phenomenon, which intensified in the mid-1970s, was drugi obieg, or the "second circuit" of publishing.

== Techniques ==
Historian Sergo Mikoyan claimed that decades prior to the early 1960s, offices and stores had to submit papers with examples of their typewriters' typeface to local KGB branches so that any printed text could be traced back to the source, to prosecute those who had used the typewriter to produce material deemed illegal. With the introduction of photocopying machines, the KGB's Fifth Directorate and Agitprop Department required individuals to get authorization to use printing office photocopiers to prevent the mass production of unapproved material, though restrictions could be bypassed by bribing employees.

Privately owned typewriters were considered the most practical means of reproducing samizdat during this time due to these copy machine restrictions. Usually, multiple copies of a single text would be simultaneously made on carbon paper or tissue paper, which were inexpensive and relatively easy to conceal. Copies would then be passed around within trusted networks.

=== Physical form ===
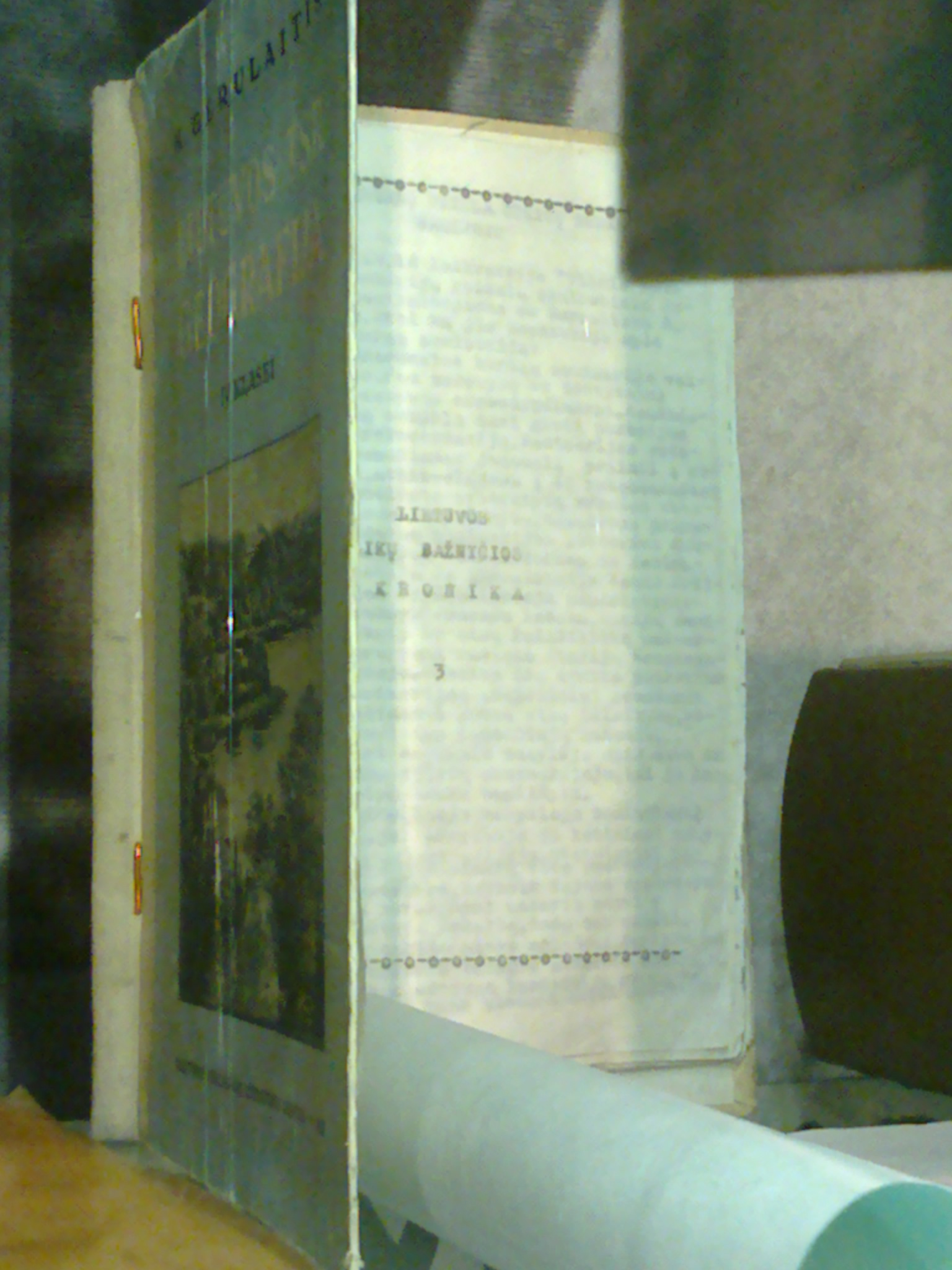
Samizdat concealed within a bookbinding; seen in the Museum of Occupations and Freedom Fights, Vilnius

Samizdat distinguishes itself not only by the ideas and debates that it helped spread to a wider audience but also by its physical form. The hand-typed, often blurry and wrinkled pages with numerous typographical errors and nondescript covers helped to separate and elevate Russian samizdat from Western literature. Of note were portable typewriters. For example, imported from East Germany to the Soviet Union, Erika typewriter was popular in samizdat, as immortalized in the lines of Soviet dissident poet Alexander Galich:

«Эрика» берёт четыре копии,
Вот и всё! А этого достаточно!»

(" 'Erika' takes four copies, and that's all! But that's enough!")

In time, dissidents in the USSR began to admire these qualities for their own sake, the ragged appearance of samizdat contrasting sharply with the smooth, well-produced appearance of texts passed by the censor's office for publication by the State. The form samizdat took gained precedence over the ideas it expressed and became a potent symbol of the resourcefulness and rebellious spirit of the inhabitants of the Soviet Union. In effect, the physical form of samizdat itself elevated the reading of samizdat to a prized clandestine act.

== Readership ==
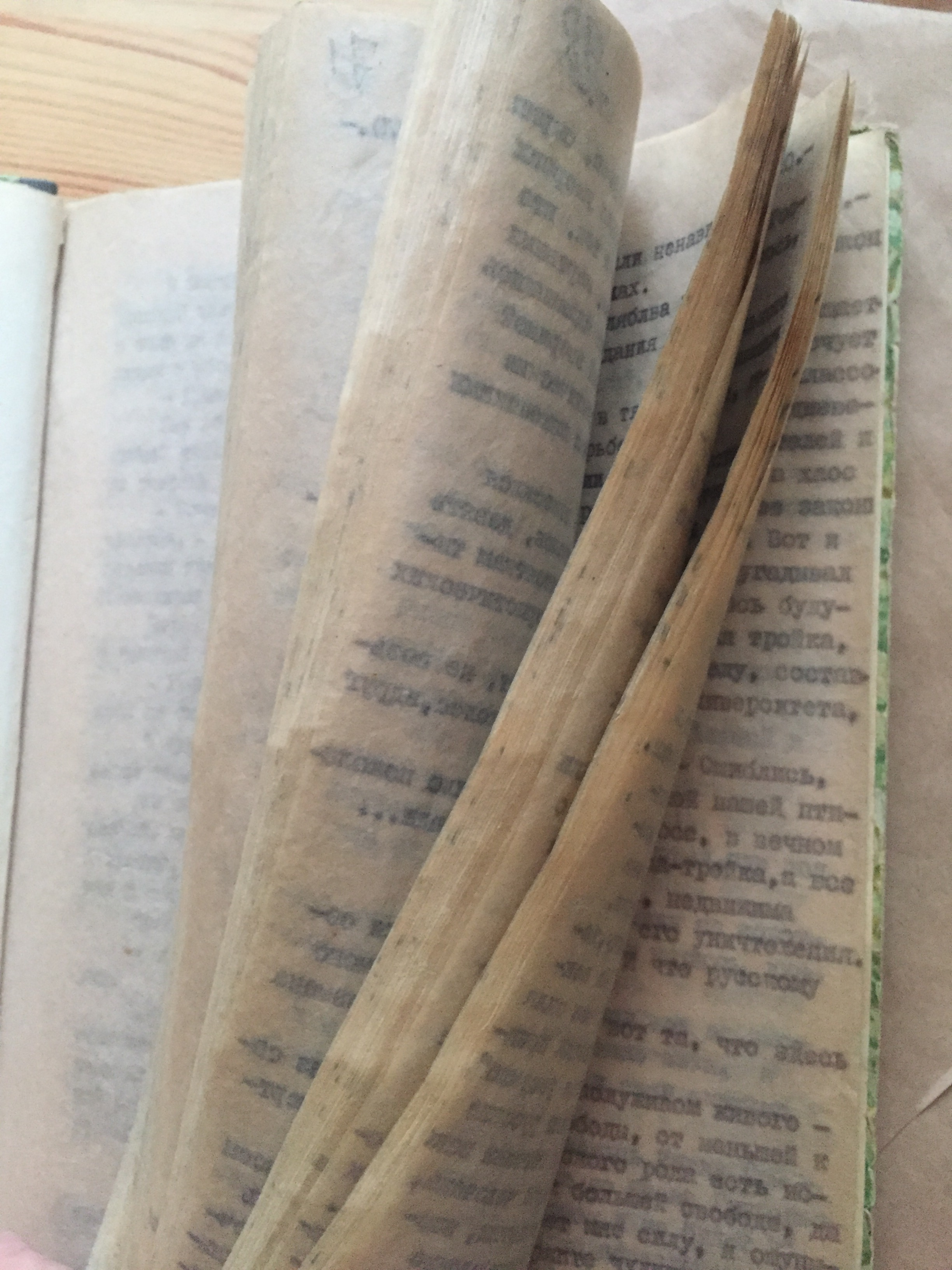
A closeup of typewritten samizdat, Moscow

Samizdat originated from the dissident movement of the Russian intelligentsia, and most samizdat directed itself to a readership of Russian elites. While circulation of samizdat was relatively low, at around 200,000 readers on average, many of these readers possessed positions of cultural power and authority. Furthermore, with the simultaneous censorship of information and necessity of absorbing information to know how to censor it, many government officials became readers of samizdat. Although the general public at times came into contact with samizdat, most of the public lacked access to the few expensive samizdat texts in circulation and expressed discontent with the highly censored reading material made available by the state.

The purpose and methods of samizdat may contrast with the purpose of the concept of copyright.

== History ==
Self-published and self-distributed literature has a long history in Russia. Samizdat is unique to the post-Stalin USSR and other countries with similar systems. Faced with the state's powers of censorship, society turned to underground literature for analysis and self-expression.

=== Samizdat books and editions ===
The first full-length book to be distributed as samizdat was Boris Pasternak's 1957 novel Doctor Zhivago. Although the literary magazine Novy Mir had published ten poems from the book in 1954, a year later the full text was judged unsuitable for publication and entered samizdat circulation.

Certain works, though published legally by the State-controlled media, were practically impossible to find in bookshops and libraries, and found their way into samizdat: for example Aleksandr Solzhenitsyn's novel One Day in the Life of Ivan Denisovich was widely distributed via samizdat.

At the outset of the Khrushchev Thaw in the mid-1950s USSR poetry became very popular. Writings of a wide variety of poets circulated among the Soviet intelligentsia: known, prohibited, repressed writers as well as those young and unknown. A number of samizdat publications carried unofficial poetry, among them the Moscow magazine Sintaksis (1959–1960) by writer Alexander Ginzburg, Vladimir Osipov's Boomerang (1960), and Phoenix (1961), produced by Yuri Galanskov and Alexander Ginzburg. The editors of these magazines were regulars at impromptu public poetry readings between 1958 and 1961 on Mayakovsky Square in Moscow. The gatherings did not last long, for soon the authorities began clamping down on them. In the summer of 1961, several meeting regulars were arrested and charged with "anti-Soviet agitation and propaganda" (Article 70 of the RSFSR Penal Code), putting an end to most of the magazines.

Not everything published in samizdat had political overtones. In 1963, Joseph Brodsky was charged with "social parasitism" and convicted for samizdat poetry. His poems circulated in samizdat, with only four judged as suitable for official Soviet anthologies. In the mid-1960s an unofficial literary group known as SMOG (a word meaning variously one was able, I did it, etc.; as an acronym the name also bore a range of interpretations) issued an almanac titled The Sphinxes (Sfinksy) and collections of prose and poetry. Some of their writings were close to the Russian avant-garde of the 1910s and 1920s.

The 1965 show trial of writers Yuli Daniel and Andrei Sinyavsky, charged with anti-Soviet agitation and propaganda, and the subsequent increased repression, marked the demise of the Thaw and the beginning of harsher times for samizdat authors. The trial was carefully documented in a samizdat collection called The White Book (1966), compiled by Yuri Galanskov and Alexander Ginzburg. Both writers were among those later arrested and sentenced to prison in what was known as Trial of the Four. In the following years some samizdat content became more politicized and played an important role in the dissident movement in the Soviet Union.

=== Samizdat periodicals ===
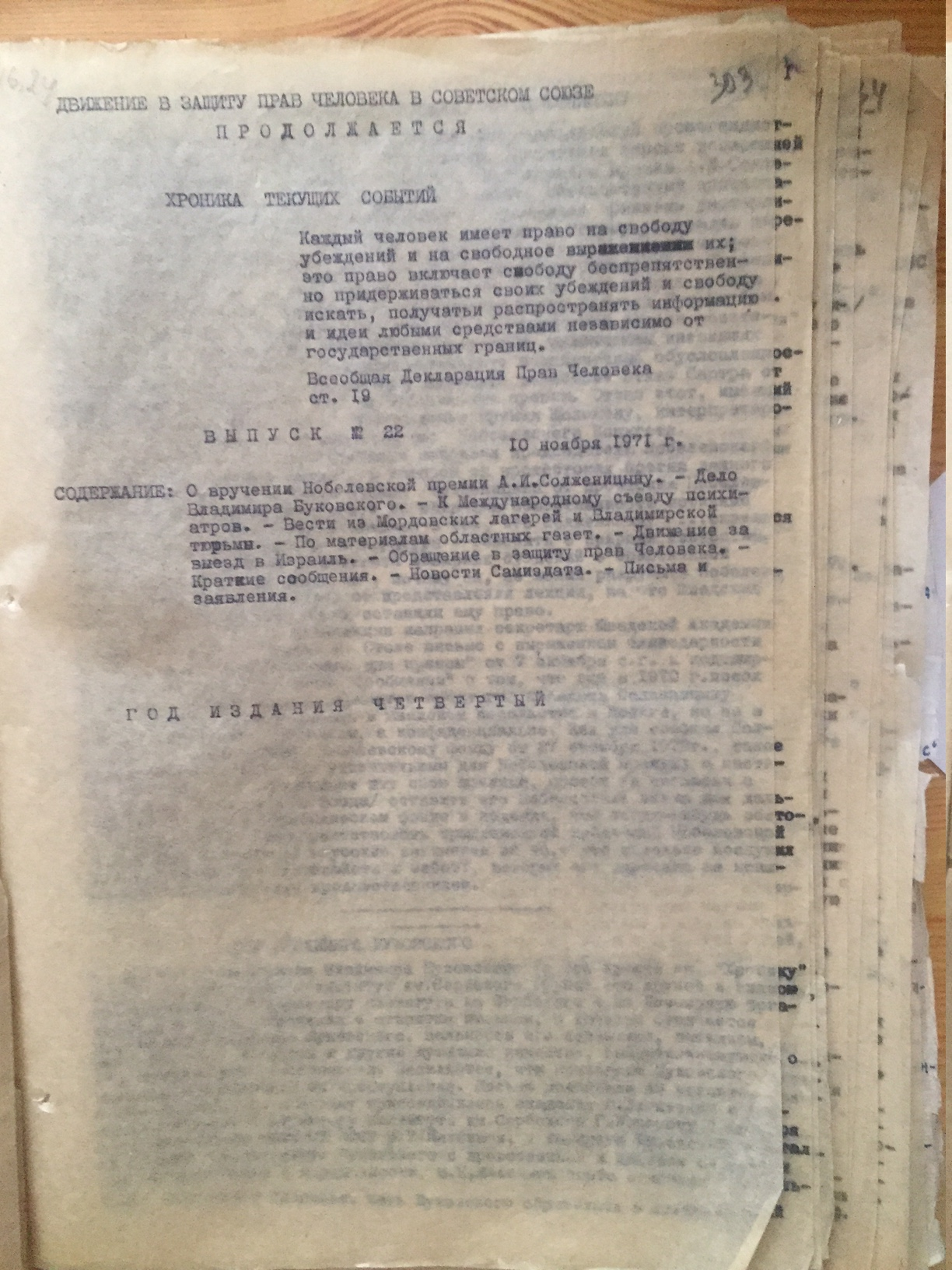
A typewritten copy of the Russian human rights periodical A Chronicle of Current Events, Moscow

The earliest samizdat periodicals were short-lived and mainly literary in focus: Sintaksis (1959–1960), Boomerang (1960), and Phoenix (1961). From 1964 to 1970, communist historian Roy Medvedev regularly published The Political Journal (Политический дневник, or political diary), which contained analytical materials that later appeared in the West.

The longest-running and best-known samizdat periodical was A Chronicle of Current Events (Хроника текущих событий). It was dedicated to defending human rights by providing accurate information about events in the USSR. Over 15 years, from April 1968 to December 1982, 65 issues were published, all but two appearing in English translation. The anonymous editors encouraged the readers to use the same distribution channels in order to send feedback and local information to be published in subsequent issues.

The Chronicle was distinguished by its dry, concise style and punctilious correction of even the smallest error. Its regular rubrics were "Arrests, Searches, Interrogations", "Extra-judicial Persecution", "In Prisons and Camps", "Samizdat update", "News in brief", and "Persecution of Religion". Over time, sections were added on the "Persecution of the Crimean Tatars", "Persecution and Harassment in Ukraine", "Lithuanian Events", and so on.

The Chronicle editors maintained that, according to the 1936 Soviet Constitution, then in force, their publication was not illegal. The authorities did not accept the argument. Many people were harassed, arrested, imprisoned, or forced to leave the country for their involvement in the Chronicle's production and distribution. The periodical's typist and first editor Natalya Gorbanevskaya was arrested and put in a psychiatric hospital for taking part in the August 1968 Red Square protest against the invasion of Czechoslovakia. In 1974, two of the periodical's close associates (Pyotr Yakir and Victor Krasin) were persuaded to denounce their fellow editors and the Chronicle on Soviet television. This put an end to the periodical's activities, until Sergei Kovalev, Tatyana Khodorovich and Tatyana Velikanova openly announced their readiness to resume publication. After being arrested and imprisoned, they were replaced, in turn, by others.

Another notable and long-running (about 20 issues in the period of 1972–1980) publication was the refusenik political and literary magazine "Евреи в СССР" (Yevrei v SSSR, Jews in the USSR), founded and edited by Alexander Voronel and, after his imprisonment, by Mark Azbel and Alexander Luntz.

The late 1980s, which were marked by an increase in informal organizations, saw a renewed wave of samizdat periodicals in the Soviet Union. Publications that were active during that time included Glasnost (edited by Sergei Grigoryants), Ekspress-khronika (Express-Chronicle, edited by Alexander Podrabinek), Svobodnoye slovo ("Free word", by the Democratic Union formed in May 1988), Levyi povorot ("Left turn", edited by Boris Kagarlitsky), Otkrytaya zona ("Open zone") of Club Perestroika, Merkurii ("Mercury", edited by Elena Zelinskaya) and Khronograph ("Chronograph", put out by a number of Moscow activists).

Not all samizdat trends were liberal or clearly opposed to the Soviet government and the official literary establishment. "The Russian Party... was a very strange element of the political landscape of Leonid Brezhnev's era—feeling themselves practically dissidents, members of the Russian Party with rare exceptions took quite prestigious official positions in the world of writers or journalists," wrote Oleg Kashin in 2009.

== Genres ==
Samizdat covered a large range of topics, mainly literature focused on religion, nationality and politics. The state censored a variety of materials such as detective novels, adventure stories, and science fiction in addition to dissident texts, resulting in the underground publications covering those topics as well. Though most samizdat authors directed their works towards the intelligentsia, samizdat included lowbrow genres in addition to scholarly works.

Hyung-Min Joo carried out a detailed analysis of an archive of samizdat (Архив Самиздата, Arkhiv Samizdata) by Radio Liberty, sponsored by the US Congress and launched in the 1960s, and reported that of its 6,607 items, 1% were literary, 17% nationalist, 20% religious, and 62% political, noting that as a rule, literary works were not collected there, so their 1% (only 73 texts) are not representative of their real share of circulation.

=== Literary ===
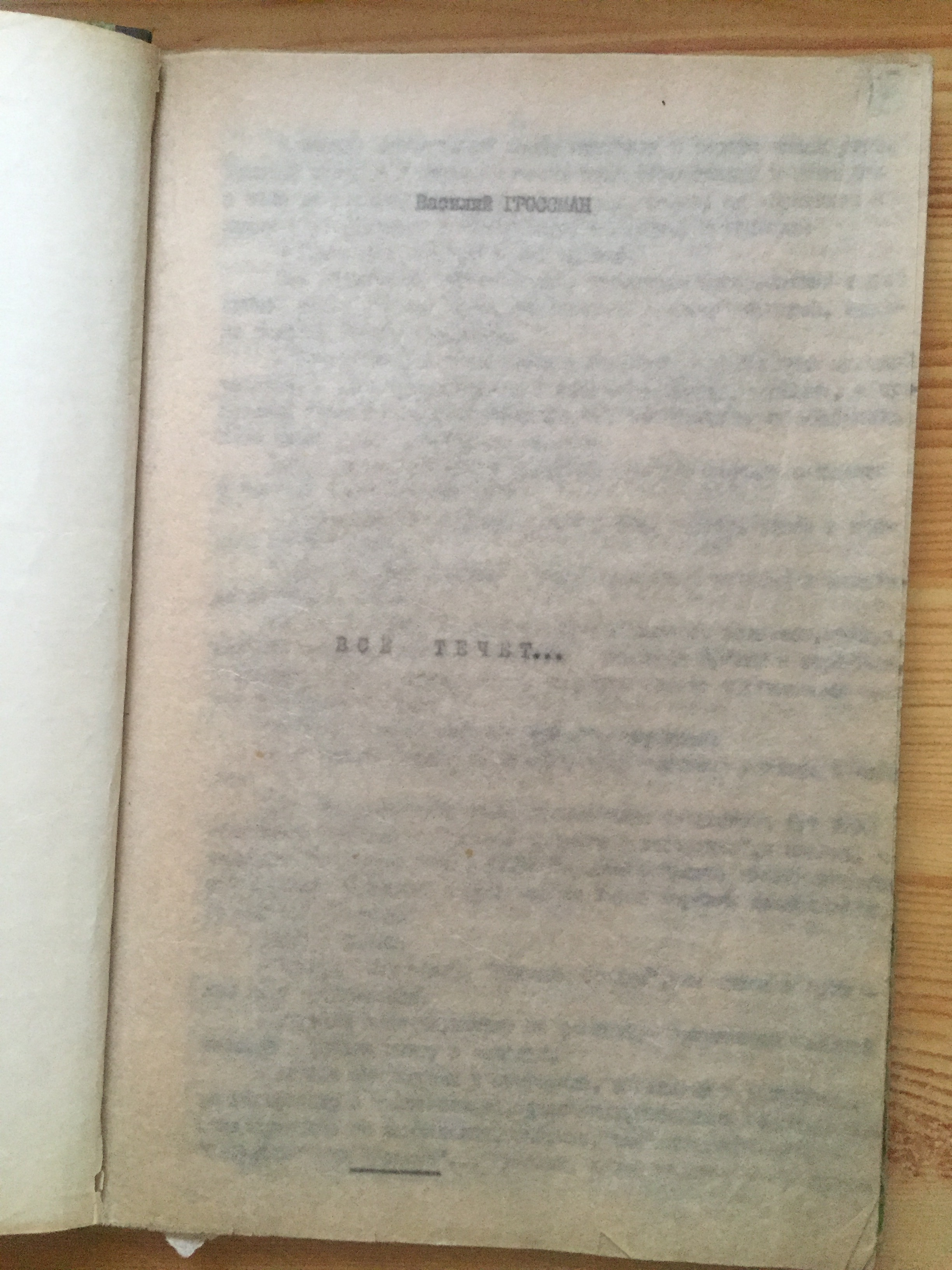
A typewritten edition of Everything Flows by Vasily Grossman, Moscow

In its early years, samizdat defined itself as a primarily literary phenomenon that included the distribution of poetry, classic unpublished Russian literature, and famous 20th century foreign literature. Literature played a key role in the existence of the samizdat phenomenon. For instance, the USSR's refusal to publish Boris Pasternak's epic novel Doctor Zhivago led to the novel's subsequent underground publication. Likewise, the circulation of Alexander Solzhenitsyn's famous work about the gulag system, The Gulag Archipelago, promoted a samizdat revival during the mid-1970s. However, because samizdat by definition placed itself in opposition to the state, samizdat works became increasingly focused on the state's violation of human rights, before shifting towards politics.

=== Political ===
A great number of samizdat texts were politically focused. Most of the political texts were personal statements, appeals, protests, or information on arrests and trials. Other political samizdat included analyses of various crises within the USSR, and suggested alternatives to the government's handling of events.

No unified political thought existed within samizdat; rather, authors debated from a variety of perspectives. Samizdat written from socialist, democratic and Slavophile perspectives dominated the debates. Socialist authors compared the current state of the government to the Marxist ideals of socialism and appealed to the state to fulfil its promises. Socialist samizdat writers hoped to give a "human face" to socialism by expressing dissatisfaction with the system of censorship. Many socialists put faith in the potential for reform in the Soviet Union, especially because of the political liberalization which occurred under Dubček in Czechoslovakia. However, the Soviet invasion of a liberalizing Czechoslovakia, in the events of the "Prague Spring", crushed hopes for reform and stymied the power of the socialist viewpoint. Because the state proved itself unwilling to reform, samizdat began to focus on alternative political systems. In Czechoslovakia itself, it became central to the underground counter-culture emerging under the normalization regime that followed the invasion.

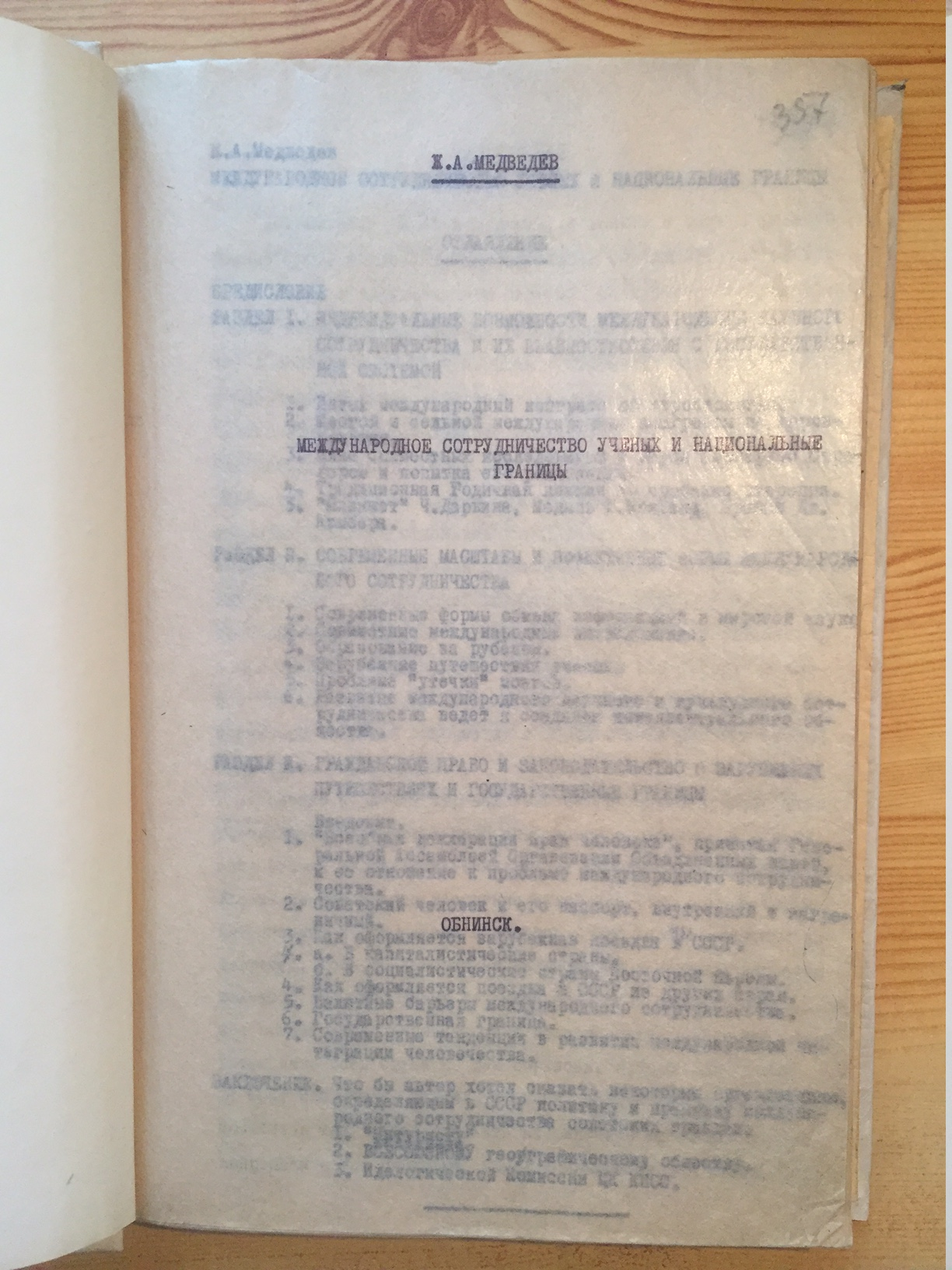
A typewritten edition of National Frontiers and International Scientific Cooperation by Zhores Medvedev

Within samizdat, several works focused on the possibility of a democratic political system. Democratic samizdat possessed a revolutionary nature because of its claim that a fundamental shift in political structure was necessary to reform the state, unlike socialists, who hoped to work within the same basic political framework to achieve change. Despite the revolutionary nature of the democratic samizdat authors, most democrats advocated moderate strategies for change. Most democrats believed in an evolutionary approach to achieving democracy in the USSR, and they focused on advancing their cause along open, public routes, rather than underground routes.

In opposition to both democratic and socialist samizdat, Slavophile samizdat grouped democracy and socialism together as Western ideals that were unsuited to the Eastern European mentality. Slavophile samizdat brought a nationalistic Russian perspective to the political debate and espoused the importance of cultural diversity and the uniqueness of Slavic cultures. Samizdat written from the Slavophile perspective attempted to unite the USSR under a vision of a shared glorious history of Russian autocracy and Orthodoxy.

Consequently, the fact that the USSR encompassed a diverse range of nationalities and lacked a singular Russian history hindered the Slavophile movement. By espousing frequently racist and anti-Semitic views of Russian superiority, through either purity of blood or the strength of Russian Orthodoxy, the Slavophile movement in samizdat alienated readers and created divisions within the opposition.

=== Religious ===
Predominantly Orthodox, Catholic, Baptist, Pentecostal, and Adventist groups authored religious samizdat texts. Though a diversity of religious samizdat circulated, including three Buddhist texts, no known Islamic samizdat texts exist. The lack of Islamic samizdat appears incongruous with the large percentage of Muslims who resided in the USSR.

=== National ===
Jewish samizdat advocated for the end of repression of Jews in the USSR and some expressed a desire for aliyah, the ability to leave Russia for an Israeli homeland. The aliyah movement also broached broader topics of human rights and freedoms of Soviet citizens. However, a divide existed within Jewish samizdat between more militant authors who advocated Jewish emigration and wrote mostly in politically-focused periodicals, and those who argued that Jews should remain in the USSR to inculcate Jewish consciousness and culture, writing in periodicals centered on cultural-literary information.

Crimean Tatars, Volga Germans, and Meskhetian Turks also created samizdat literature, protesting the state's refusal to allow them to return to their homelands following Stalin's death. Descriptions in the samizdat literature of Crimean Tatars, Volga Germans, and Meskhetian Turks documenting the political injustices borne by those peoples are dominated by references to "genocide" and "concentration camps". Ukrainian samizdat opposed the assumed superiority of Russian culture over the Ukrainian and condemned the forced assimilation of Ukrainians to the Russian language.

== Contraband audio ==
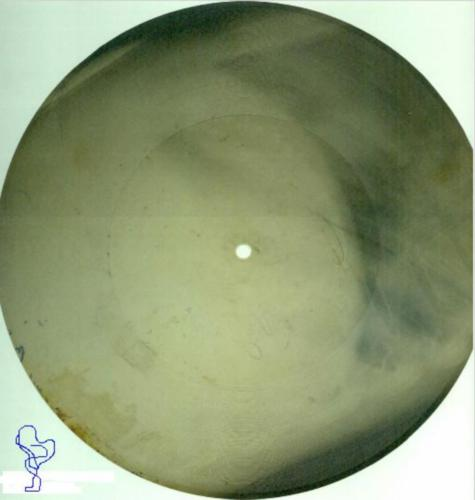
A homemade "bone record"

Ribs, "music on the ribs", "bone records", or roentgenizdat (roentgen- from the Russian term for X-ray, named for Wilhelm Röntgen) were homemade phonograph records, copied from forbidden recordings that were smuggled into the country. Their content was Western rock and roll, jazz, mambo, and other music, and music by banned emigres, such as Pyotr Leshchenko and Alexander Vertinsky. They were sold and traded on the black market.

Each disc is a thin, flexible plastic sheet recorded with a spiral groove on one side, playable on a normal phonograph turntable at 78 RPM. They were made from an inexpensive, available material: used X-ray film (hence the name roentgenizdat). Each large rectangular sheet was trimmed into a circle and individually recorded using an improvised recording lathe. The discs and their limited sound quality resemble the mass-produced flexi discs and may have been inspired by it.

Magnitizdat (magnit- from magnitofon, the Russian word for tape recorder) is the distribution of sound recordings on audio tape, often of bards, Western artists, and underground music groups. Magnitizdat replaced roentgenizdat, as it was cheaper and more efficient method of reproduction that resulted in higher quality copies.

== Further influence ==
In hacker and computer jargon, the term samizdat was used for the dissemination of needed and hard to obtain documents or information.

== Notable samizdat periodicals ==
- A-YA
- Bulletin "V"
- Chronicle of Current Events
- Chronicle of the Catholic Church in Lithuania
- Phoenix
- Sintaksis

== See also ==
- Polish underground press
- Eastern Bloc media and propaganda
- Gosizdat
- Human rights in the Soviet Union
- Political repression in the Soviet Union
- Shadow library
  - Anna's Archive
  - Library Genesis
  - Z-Library
- Underground press
- USSR anti-religious campaign (1970s–1987)

== General sources ==
- Bukovsky, Vladimir (1979). To Build a Castle: My Life as a Dissenter. New York: Viking Press. ISBN 978-0-670-71640-1.
- Balan, Borys (1993). "Samvydav". In Kubijovyč, Volodymyr (ed.). Encyclopedia of Ukraine. 4: Ph - Sr. Toronto: Univ. of Toronto Press. ISBN 978-0-8020-3994-1.
- Kind-Kovács, Friederike; Labov, Jessie, eds. (2013). Samizdat, Tamizdat, and Beyond: Transnational Media During and After Socialism. Studies in contemporary European history. New York: Berghahn Books. ISBN 978-0-85745-585-7.
  - Kind-Kovács, Friederike; Labov, Jessie (2013). "Samizdat and Tamizdat". In Friederike Kind-Kovács; Jessie Labov (eds.). Samizdat, Tamizdat, and Beyond: Transnational Media During and After Socialism. Studies in contemporary European history. New York: Berghahn Books. pp. 1–29. ISBN 978-0-85745-585-7.
- Feldbrugge, F. J. M. (1975). Samizdat and Political Dissent in the Soviet Union. Leyden: A.W. Sijthoff. ISBN 978-90-286-0175-8.
- Alexeyeva, Ludmilla (1987). Soviet Dissent: Contemporary Movements for National, Religious, and Human Rights. Carol Pearce, John Glad (trans.). Middletown, Conn.: Wesleyan University Press. ISBN 978-0-8195-6176-3.
- Crump, Thomas (2013). Brezhnev and the Decline of the Soviet Union. Routledge Studies in the History of Russia and Eastern Europe. Routledge. ISBN 978-1-134-66922-6.
- Urban, Michael E.; Igrunov, V.; Mitrokhin, S. S. (1997). The Rebirth of Politics in Russia. Cambridge; New York: Cambridge University Press. p. 87. ISBN 978-0-521-56248-5.
- Reddaway, Peter (1972). Uncensored Russia – protest and dissent in the Soviet Union. The unofficial Moscow journal, A Chronicle of Current Events. New York: American Heritage Press. ISBN 978-0070513549.
- Klots, Yasha (2023). Tamizdat: contraband Russian literature in the Cold War era. Cornell University Press. ISBN 9781501768989.
- Meerson-Aksenov, Mikhail Georgievich; Shragin, Boris Iosifovich (1977). The Political, social, and religious thought of Russian samizdat: an anthology. Belmont, MA: Nordland Pub. Co. ISBN 978-0-913124-13-0.
- Komaromi, Ann (2004). "The Material Existence of Soviet Samizdat". Slavic Review. 63 (3): 597–618. doi:10.2307/1520346. JSTOR 1520346. S2CID 155327040.
- Joo, Hyung-min (June 2004). "Voices of freedom: samizdat". Europe-Asia Studies. 56 (4): 571–594. doi:10.1080/0966813042000220476. JSTOR 4147387. S2CID 155084186.
- Stelmakh, Valeria D. (Winter 2001). "Reading in the Context of Censorship in the Soviet Union". Libraries & the Cultural Record. 36 (1): 143–151. doi:10.1353/lac.2001.0022. ISSN 1932-9555. S2CID 142374023.
- Etkind, Efim (1992). "Afterword: Russian literature in the 1980s". In Charles Moser (ed.). The Cambridge History of Russian Literature. Cambridge: Cambridge University Press. pp. 595–614. ISBN 978-1-139-05544-4.
- "Bones And Grooves: The Weird Secret History Of Soviet X-Ray Music". NPR. 9 January 2016.
- "samizdat". Jargon File 4.4.8. Eric Raymond. 2004-10-01.
- Raymond, Eric S. (1996). The New Hacker's Dictionary (3rd ed.). Cambridge, MA: MIT Press. pp. 395–396. ISBN 978-0-262-18178-5.
- Yurchak, Alexei (2006). Everything was forever, until it was no more : the last Soviet generation. Princeton, NJ : Princeton University Press. ISBN 978-0-691-12117-8.
