= Phoenix (literary magazine) =

Phoenix was a samizdat literary magazine published by Yuri Galanskov in 1960 and 1966. The magazine was founded by Galanskov and Alexander Ginzburg. Only two issues were ever produced (Phoenix in 1960 and Phoenix-66 in 1966). The magazine died after the arrest of Galanskov and subsequent Trial of the Four.

== Repression ==
The editors of Phoenix 66 were arrested on 17 and 19 January 1967. In 1967–1968, Galanskov, Ginzburg, Alexey Dobrovolsky, and Vera Lashkova were put on trial for editing and distributing (and printing in the case of Lashkova) Phoenix-66, as well as the White Book, a document on the case of Sinyavsky and Daniel. During the so-called "Trial of Four", Ginzburg was sentenced to 5 years in prison, and Galanskov to 7 (Galanskov later died in custody).

== See also ==
- Sintaksis (Moscow)
