= Yuri Galanskov =

Soviet writer and dissident

Yuri Timofeyevich Galanskov
- Native name: Юрий Тимофеевич Галансков
- Born: 19 June 1939 Moscow, Soviet Union
- Died: 4 November 1972 (aged 33) Mordovia, Soviet Union
- Occupation: Journalist, essayist, poet, and publisher
- Period: 1961–1966
- Subject: Politics, communism
- Literary movement: Samizdat

Yuri Timofeyevich Galanskov (Russian: Ю́рий Тимофе́евич Галанско́в; 19 June 1939 – 4 November 1972) was a Russian poet, historian, human rights activist and dissident. For his political activities, such as founding and editing samizdat almanac Phoenix, he was incarcerated in prisons, camps and forced treatment psychiatric hospitals (Psikhushkas). He died in a labor camp.

== Early publications ==
Yuri Galanskov began his dissident activities in 1959, as a participant in the poetry readings in Mayakovsky Square. Several of his works were published in the samizdat anthology Sintaksis. After Alexander Ginzburg was arrested in 1960 for publishing Sintaksis, Yuri Galanskov became the leader of dissident publishing in the Soviet Union. Galanskov’s first publication, Phoenix came in 1961, and contained direct criticism of the Soviet government, partly in the form of poetry. Phoenix published works by Boris Pasternak, Natalya Gorbanevskaya, Ivan Kharabarov, and Galanskov himself.

As a punishment for publishing Phoenix, the Soviet authorities convicted Galanskov and sentenced him to several months in a psychiatric hospital. Following his release, Galanskov formed a friendship with Alexander Ginzburg, and together the two publishers made arrangements to have their work published in the West.

Georgy Shchedrovitsky, who had taught Galanskov at school, signed a letter in support of Galanskov and Ginzburg during their show trial in February 1968.

== The Daniel-Sinyavsky Trial ==
During the years of Nikita Khrushchev’s leadership, frustrations had been mounting in the Kremlin over the difficulty of suppressing the Samizdat literary movement. In 1965, the Soviets arrested Yuli Daniel and Andrei Sinyavsky, two prominent samizdat writers. The trial was made a media spectacle, with Pravda issuing passionate condemnations of the defendants. The trial did not, however, discourage the underground literary movement. Instead, it provoked the first spontaneous political demonstration to occur in the Soviet Union in 30 years, which Galanskov helped organize. Yuri Galanskov and Alexander Ginzburg also compiled detailed notes of the trial and released their observations in a four-hundred page report known as The White Book. This work was widely circulated among the dissident writers and was eventually smuggled out to the West.

== Final work ==
Shortly after the release of The White Book, Galanskov released the second edition of Phoenix, titled Phoenix '66. This issue featured works by Gorbanyevskaya, Yuri Stefanov, and Vladimir Batshev. It was generally regarded as being even more daring than the first issue. The KGB arrested him and four others in January 1967.

== Trial of the Four ==
In what came to be known as The Trial of the Four, the Soviet Union brought charges against Yuri Galanskov for publishing Phoenix. The prosecutors also charged Alexander Dobrovolsky with contributing to the magazine, Vera Lashkova with assisting the typing of the manuscript, and Alexander Ginzburg with collaborating with Galanskov on The White Book. Lashkova was sentenced to a year in prison. Dobrovolsky was sentenced to two years at hard labour, while Ginzburg received five years at hard labour. Galanskov was sentenced to seven years at a labor camp in Mordovia.

== Imprisonment and death ==
In 1968 Galanskov was sentenced to 7 years in a labor camp and was sent to a facility next to Ozyorny in the Republic of Mordovia. During his years in prison, Galanskov advocated the rights of prisoners. In collaboration with Ginzburg, he wrote a letter describing the poor conditions and cruel guards of the labor camp. The letter was smuggled out of Russia and published in the West.

According to accounts that reached the West at that time, Galanskov who suffered from bleeding ulcers, was not allowed to receive medical care after his imprisonment, and was fed prison fare of salt fish and black bread. He died after being operated for a perforated ulcer by another inmate who had no qualification in surgery, after the operation camp administration refused to transfer him to a hospital or allow qualified doctors to visit him. Prior to his death Galanskov managed to sneak a letter home saying: "They are doing everything to hasten my death."

== Works by Yuri Galanskov ==
- Diacritica.com, For an End to the Policy of Reprisals
- The Human Manifesto, Translated from Russian by George Reavey in "The New Russian Poets 1953-1968"
- Five poems translated from Russian by Anatoly Kudryavitsky in "Accursed Poets: Dissident Poetry from Soviet Russia 1960-1980", Smokestack Books, 2020
- Galanskov, Youri (1982). Le manifeste humain précédé par les témoignages de Vladimir Boukovsky, Nathalia Gorbanevskaïa, Alexandre Guinzbourg, Edouard Kouznetsov [Human manifesto preceded by testimonies of Vladimir Bukovsky, Natalya Gorbanevskaya, Alexander Ginzburg, Eduard Kuznetsov] (in French). Lausanne: Editions L'Age d'Homme. ISBN 2825109207.
