= Anti-Soviet agitation =

Criminal offense against the Marxist-Leninist Eurasian state

Anti-Soviet agitation and propaganda (Russian: антисове́тская агита́ция и пропага́нда, АСА, romanized: antisovetskaya agitatsiya i propaganda, ASA) was a criminal offence in the Soviet Union. Initially, the term was interchangeably used with counter-revolutionary agitation. The latter term was in use immediately after the October Revolution of 1917. The offence was codified in criminal law in the 1920s, and revised in the 1950s in two articles of the Russian SFSR Criminal Code. The offence was widely used against Soviet dissidents.

== Stalin era ==
The new Criminal Codes of the 1920s introduced the offence of anti-Soviet agitation and propaganda as one of the many forms of counter-revolutionary activity grouped together under Article 58 of the Russian RSFSR Penal Code. The article was put in force on 25 February 1927 and remained in force throughout the period of Stalinism. Article 58:10, "propaganda and agitation that called to overturn or undermining of the Soviet regime", was punishable with at least 6 months of imprisonment, up to and including the death sentence in periods of war or unrest.

As applied under during Stalin's rule, the phrase in practice could mean virtually anything that a State security interrogator or informant wanted it to mean; consequently, the charge became an exceedingly potent weapon in political or personal quarrels and intrigues.

== 1960s–1980s ==
=== Article 70 ===
Anti-Soviet agitation

Presidium of the Supreme Soviet of the RSFSR
- Long title: Anti-Soviet Agitation and Propaganda
- Citation: Ved. 1962 No. 29 item 449
- Enacted by: Presidium of the Supreme Soviet of the RSFSR
- Enacted: 25 July 1962

The offence was significantly revised in the post-Stalin Criminal Code of the Russian SFSR, introduced in 1958. Article 58.10 was replaced by Article 70, Anti-Soviet agitation and propaganda. (Note: In the new Criminal Code of the other 14 Union republics this offence had a different numeration, e.g. Article 62 in the Ukrainian SSR, and to avoid confusion was usually expressed as Article 70.)

It was defined as:

1. propaganda or agitation with the purpose of undermining or weakening of the Soviet power or with the purpose of committing or incitement to commit particularly grave crimes against the Soviet state (as defined in the law);
2. the spreading with the same purposes of slanderous fabrications that target the Soviet political and social system;
3. production, dissemination or storage, for the same purposes, of literature with anti-Soviet content.

The new definition, despite being less draconian than its predecessor, had few if any parallels in the criminal codes of democratic countries.

'You are a Soviet man,' says the KGB detective, 'and therefore obliged to help us.' And what can you say in reply? If you're not Soviet, what are you: anti-Soviet? That alone is worth seven years in the labor camp and five in exile.

— Vladimir Bukovsky

The penalty was from six months to 7 years of imprisonment, with possible subsequent internal exile from 2 to 5 years. Article 70 was considered by critics of the Soviet regime as a grave violation of freedom of speech. It was one of the two main legal instruments for the prosecution of Soviet dissidents, the other being Article 190 of the Russian SFSR Criminal Code. Other means of control were extrajudicial, such as the use of punitive psychiatry or the generalised offence of "social parasitism". In particular, the clause about literature targeted samizdat. (Note: In 1984, the phrasing was expanded to include "materials in written, printed or other form", which could accommodate art works, video cassettes and any other new form of technology that appeared in the USSR.)

=== Article 190-1 ===
Anti-Soviet agitation

Presidium of the Supreme Soviet of the RSFSR
- Long title: Circulation of Fabrications Known to be False Which Defame the Soviet State and Social System
- Citation: Ved. 1966 No. 38 item 1038
- Enacted by: Presidium of the Supreme Soviet of the RSFSR
- Enacted: 16 September 1966

Shortly after the Sinyavsky-Daniel show trial, the Soviet Penal Code was augmented with Article 190–1, Dissemination of knowingly false fabrications that defame the Soviet state and social system (1966), which was a weaker version of Article 70. It basically repeated the Article 70, with the omitted provision of the "anti-Soviet purpose". The penalty was lower: up to three years of imprisonment.

=== Application ===
Petro Grigorenko in his memoirs wrote that any critique of the Soviet government or events in the Soviet Union was easily classified as ASA. Dissemination of any information which was not officially recognized was classified as "anti-Soviet slander". In this way, nearly all members of the Helsinki Watch human rights group were imprisoned. Anti-Soviet political behavior, in particular, being outspoken in opposition to the authorities, demonstrating for reform, and writing books, were defined in some persons as being simultaneously a criminal act (e.g., violation of Articles 70 or 190–1), a symptom (e.g., "delusion of reformism"), and a diagnosis (e.g., "sluggish schizophrenia"). The 70th and 190th Articles of the Criminal Code concerning "slanderous fabrications that discredited the Soviet system" and "anti-Soviet agitation and propaganda" served as the formal basis to sentence Vladimir Bukovsky, Pyotr Grigorenko, Valeria Novodvorskaya, Zhores Medvedev, Andrei Amalrik and many dissidents to months and sometimes years of indefinite confinement in psychiatric institutions.

On 19 February 1986, nuclear physicist and dissident Andrei Dmitrievich Sakharov in his letter to Mikhail Gorbachev wrote, "application by courts of Articles 70 and 190-1 is pronounced persecution for beliefs."

In 1990, a year before the very end of the Soviet regime, "anti-Soviet agitation and propaganda" was excluded from the Russian SFSR Criminal Code after the three decades of its application.

Sentences in the Russian SFSR
Period	Article 70	Article 190	Total	Annually
1956–1960	4,676	—	4,676	935.2
1957	1,964	—	1,964	1,964.0
1958	1,416	—	1,416	1,416.0
1961–1965	1,072	—	1,072	214.4
1966–1970	295	384	697	135.8
1971–1975	276	527	803	160.6
1976–1980	62	285	347	69.4
1981–1985	150	390	540	108.0
1986–1987	11	17	28	14.0
Total	6,543	1,609	8,152	254.8

== Post-Soviet Russia ==
In April 1989, Article 70 was reformulated as part of a series of statutory changes made under perestroika. It was more strictly formulated and became explicitly related to violent actions. The terms "anti-Soviet agitation and propaganda" were replaced by "public appeals", "subversion" (podryv, подрыв) and "overthrow" (sverzheniye, свержение).

In October 1992, following the dissolution of the Soviet Union, Russian law retained an offense of "public appeals to alter the constitutional order by force or to seize power, as well as the largescale distribution of material with such content", punishable by detention for a period of up to three years or a fine of twenty monthly minimum wages.

In the new Criminal Code of the Russian Federation, effective from 1 January 1997, the offence of "anti-Soviet propaganda" has no parallel. More recently, a retrogressive trend in amendments to existing laws led attorney Henri Reznik to raise the alarm about the appearance of the phrase "anti-Russian" in certain legislative proposals.

== See also ==
- Article 58 (RSFSR Penal Code)
- Inciting subversion of state power law in the People's Republic of China
