= Sintaksis (Moscow) =

Samizdat poetry journal

- Editor: Alexander Ginzburg
- Categories: Poetry magazine
- Circulation: 120–300
- Founded: 1959
- Final issue Number: April 1960; 3
- Country: Soviet Union
- Based in: Moscow
- Language: Russian

Sintaksis (Syntax, Russian: Синтаксис) was a samizdat poetry journal compiled by writer Alexander Ginzburg in 1959–1960. The periodical included poetry which could not be published officially. It is considered to be the first large-scale samizdat (self-published) periodical of a literary nature.

The typescript magazine was compiled and edited by Alexander Ginzburg in Moscow.

The first two issues featured poetry by authors in Moscow, including Bella Akhmadulina and Bulat Okudzhava, Nikolai Glazkov and Vsevolod Nekrasov.

The third issue featured poets from Leningrad, including Dmitry Bobyshev, Joseph Brodsky, Gleb Gorbovsky, Viktor Golyavkin, Mikhail Eremin, Sergey Kulle, Aleksander Kushner, Evgeny Rein, Nonna Slepakova, and Vladimir Uflyand.

Ginzburg was arrested in 1960, while working on a planned fourth issue, and served two years. The unfinished issue would have contained works by Lithuanian poets, including Tomas Venclova.

== See also ==
- Sintaksis
- Phoenix (literary magazine)
- Mayakovsky Square poetry readings
