= Alexander Ginzburg =

Russian journalist, poet, human rights activist and dissident

- Александр Ильич Гинзбург
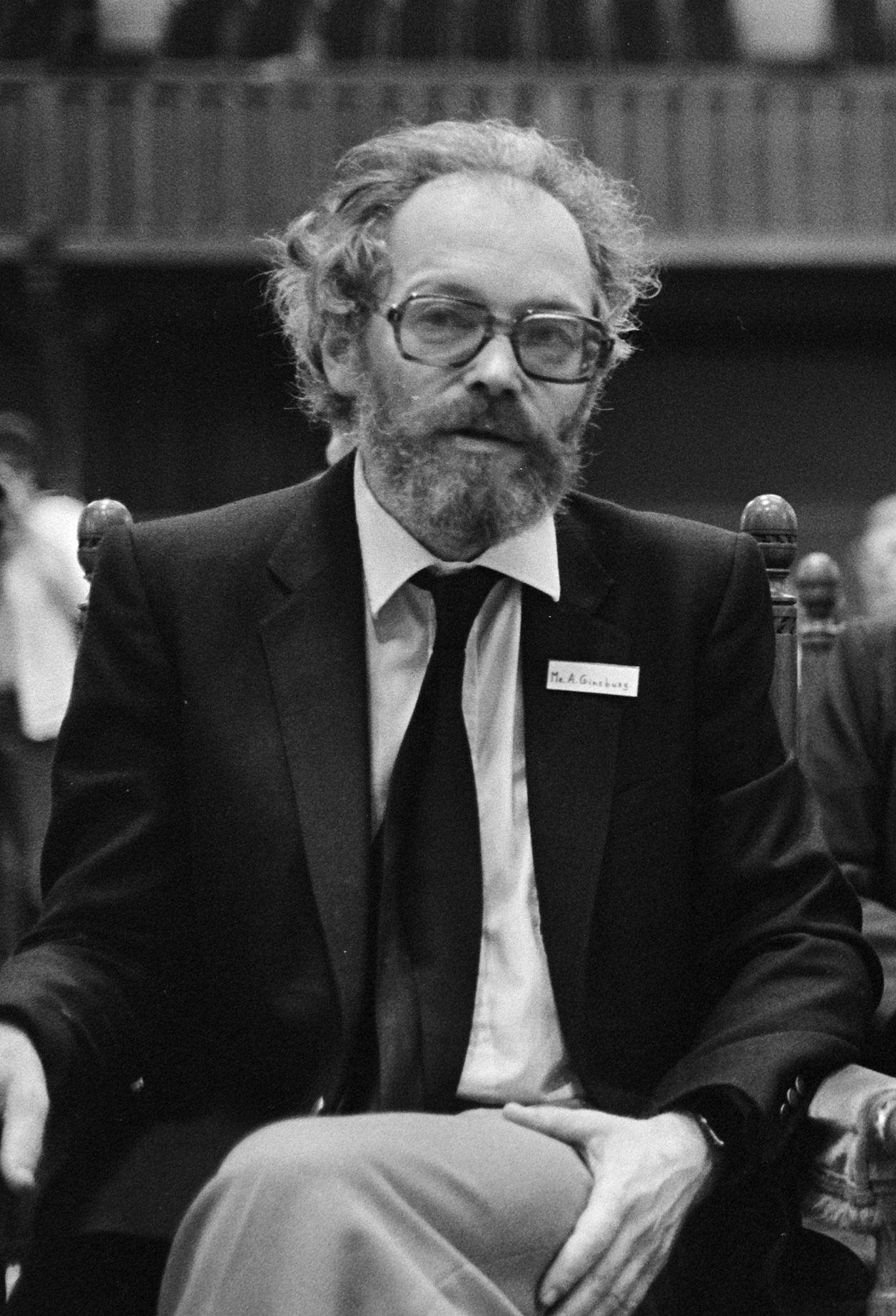
- Ginzburg at the Sakharov tribunal in The Hague on 4 September 1980
- Born: 21 November 1936; Moscow, Russian SFSR, Soviet Union
- Died: 19 July 2002 (aged 65); Paris, France
- Citizenship: Soviet Union (1936–1991) → Russian Federation (1991–2002)
- Education: Moscow State Historico-Archival Institute
- Occupations: human right activist, journalist
- Known for: human rights activism with participation in the Moscow Helsinki Group, cofounding Sintaksis and Phoenix
- Notable work: The White Book, The Trial of the Four
- Movement: dissident movement in the Soviet Union
- Spouse: Arina Sergeevna Zholkovskaya-Ginzburg
- Children: two sons: Alexander and Alexey

Alexander "Alik" Ilyich Ginzburg (Russian: Алекса́ндр Ильи́ч Ги́нзбург, IPA: [ɐlʲɪkˈsandr ɨˈlʲjidʑ ˈɡʲinzbʊrk]; 21 November 1936 – 19 July 2002) was a Russian journalist, poet, human rights activist and dissident. Between 1961 and 1969 he was sentenced three times to labor camps. In 1979, Ginzburg was released and expelled to the United States, along with four other political prisoners (Eduard Kuznetsov, Mark Dymshits, Valentin Moroz, and Georgy Vins) and their families, as part of a prisoner exchange.

== Biography ==
Ginzburg was born in Moscow to a Russian-Jewish family. He was relative (nephew) of Yevgenia Ginzburg and semi-orphan, Alexander Ginzburg. Ginzburg was educated in Moscow, and worked as a lathe operator and part time journalist after leaving school, then as an actor, but had to give up acting in 1959, after falling from a third storey window.

=== Dissident work ===
At the end of 1959, Ginzburg issued the USSR's first samizdat literary magazine Phoenix, with Yuri Galanskov. He also cofounded the poetry almanac Sintaksis. After three issues, he was expelled from Moscow University, arrested and sentenced to two years in a labour camp. Released in 1962, he was unable to find regular work, but continued to patronise underground art, by distributing literature and holding private film shows. He was returned to Lubyanka prison for a short time in 1964.

In December 1965, Alexander Ginzburg documented the trial of writers Yuli Daniel and Andrei Sinyavsky (Sinyavsky–Daniel trial). Having obtained a copy of closed-door court proceedings from the court stenographer, he compiled a White Book documenting the trial. He then sent copies of the book with his address to the KGB and the Chief Prosecutor's Office. The book also circulated in samizdat and was smuggled to the West. In December 1966, he was summoned before the KGB and ordered to repudiate the White Book, which he refused to do. He was arrested on 23 January 1967. His case was linked with Galanskov's, though the only direct link between their activities was that they both relied on the same typist, Vera Lashkova. They were co-defendants at the Trial of the Four, at the conclusion of which, on 12 January 1968, Ginzburg was sentenced to five years of forced labour.

In a labour camp in Mordvinia, Ginzburg began a hunger strike in May 1969 because the authorities had prevented him from marrying his fiancée, Irena Zholkovskaya, who was consequently prevented from visiting him. In June, he was allowed to register his marriage, but she was then sacked from her job as a teacher. For this and other protests against conditions in the camps, he was transferred in summer 1970 to Vladimir Prison.

Ginzburg was released when his five-year prison term ended, on 22 January 1972, and was allowed to settle in Tarusa, 50 miles south of Moscow. He was a friend of Alexander Solzhenitsyn, with whom he initiated the Fund for the Aid of Political Prisoners. Based on the royalties derived from Solzhenitsyn's book The Gulag Archipelago, it distributed funds and material support to political and religious prisoners across the Soviet Union throughout the 1970s and 1980s. Ginzburg had power of attorney over the fund after Solzhenitsyn's expulsion from the USSR in February 1974, but in April, he was placed under police surveillance and forbidden to leave the district of Talusa where he lived, even to walk as far as the local cinema, and was forbidden to leave the house after 8.00pm.

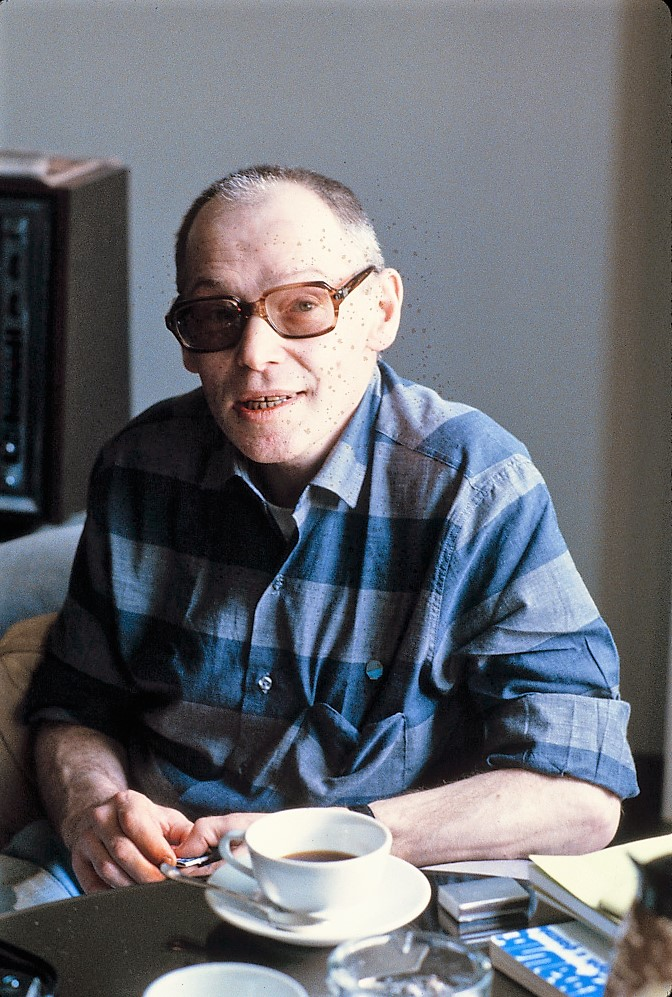
Ginzburg in 1979 after release to the USA

In 1976, Ginzburg became a founding member of the Moscow Helsinki Group, which monitored breaches of the human rights guarantees the Soviet government signed up to in the 1975 Helsinki accords. Ginzburg was given the task of monitoring the State's persecution of the smaller Christian denominations, for which he was, again, arrested in 1978 and sentenced to an eight-year prison term. In April 1979, he was with four other dissidents deprived of his citizenship and exchanged for two Soviets who had been jailed for espionage.

Throughout his career, Ginzburg advocated nonviolent resistance. He believed in exposing human rights abuses by the Soviet Union and pressuring the government to follow its own laws. He made an effort to smuggle his writings abroad in order to increase external pressure on the Soviets.

== Bibliography ==
- The White Book
- The Trial of the Four
- Guinzbourg, Alexandre (1982). "Témoignage" [Testimony]. In Galanskov, Youri (ed.). Le manifeste humain précédé par les témoignages de V. Boukovsky, N. Gorbanevskaïa, A. Guinzbourg, E. Kouznetsov [Human manifesto preceded by testimonies of V. Bukovsky, N. Gorbanevskaya, A. Ginzburg, E. Kuznetsov] (in French). Lausanne: Editions L'Age d'Homme. pp. 40–46. ISBN 2825109207.
