= Human rights movement in the Soviet Union =

In 1965, a human rights movement emerged in the Soviet Union. Those actively involved did not share a single set of beliefs. Many wanted a variety of civil rights — freedom of expression, of religious belief, of national self-determination. To some it was crucial to provide a truthful record of what was happening in the country, not the heavily censored version provided in official media outlets. Others still were "reform Communists" who thought it possible to change the Soviet system for the better.

Gradually, under the pressure of official actions and responses these groups and interests coalesced in the dissident milieu. The fight for civil and human rights focused on issues of freedom of expression, freedom of conscience, freedom to emigrate, punitive psychiatry, and the plight of political prisoners. It was characterized by a new openness of dissent, a concern for legality, the rejection of any 'underground' and violent struggle.

Like other dissidents in the post-Stalin Soviet Union, human rights activists were subjected to a broad range of repressive measures. They received warnings from the police and the KGB; some lost their jobs, others were imprisoned or incarcerated in psychiatric hospitals; dissidents were sent into exile within the country or pressured to emigrate.

== Methods and activities ==
=== Samizdat documentation ===
The documentation of political repressions as well as citizens' reactions to them through samizdat (unsanctioned self-publishing) methods played a key role in the formation of the human rights movement. Dissidents collected and distributed transcripts, open letters and appeals relating to specific cases of political repressions. (Note: A Chronicle of Current Events (CCE) 5.1 (31 December 1968), "A Survey of samizdat in 1968".)

The prototype for this type of writing was journalist Frida Vigdorova's record of the trial of poet Joseph Brodsky (convicted for "social parasitism" in early 1964). Similar documenting activity was taken up by dissidents in publications such as Alexander Ginzburg's White Book (1967, on the Sinyavsky-Daniel case) (Note: CCE 4.6 (31 October 1968) "An addition to the White Book about Sinyavsky and Daniel".) and Pavel Litvinov's The Trial of the Four (1968, on the Galanskov–Ginzburg case). (Note: CCE 1 (30 April 1968).)

From 1968 on, the samizdat periodical A Chronicle of Current Events played a key role for the human rights movement. Founded in April 1968, the Chronicle ran until 1983, producing 65 issues in 14 years. (Note: A Chronicle of Current Events (in English).) It documented the extensive human rights violations committed by the Soviet government and the ever-expanding samizdat publications (political tracts, fiction, translations) circulating among the critical and opposition-minded.

=== Protest letters and petitions ===
Podpisanty, literally signatories, were individuals who signed a series of petitions to officials and the Soviet press against political trials of the mid- to late-1960s. (Note: CCE 1.2 (30 April 1968), "Protests about the trial".) The podpisanty surge reached its high water mark during the trial of writers Aleksandr Ginzburg and Yuri Galanskov in January 1968. The authorities responded to this challenge by offering each podpisant a choice between recantation and some kind of professional punishment. Nevertheless, by 1968 more than 1500 people had signed appeals protesting various cases.

The first Soviet dissidents to appeal to the world public were Larisa Bogoraz and Pavel Litvinov, who wrote an open letter protesting the trial of samizdat authors Alexander Ginsburg and Yuri Galanskov in January 1968. Appeals to the international community and human rights bodies later became a central method of early civic dissident groups such as the Action Group (Note: CCE 8.10 (30 June 1969) "An appeal to the UN Commission on Human Rights".) and the Committee on Human Rights, as well as the Helsinki Watch Groups.

=== Demonstrations ===
Limited in scope and number, several demonstrations nevertheless became significant landmarks of the human rights movement.

On 5 December 1965 (Soviet Constitution Day) a small rally in Moscow, which became known as the (glasnost meeting), the first public and overtly political demonstration took place in the post-Stalin USSR. Responding to the criminal charges against the writers Andrei Sinyavsky and Yuli Daniel (Sinyavsky–Daniel trial), a few dozen people gathered on Pushkin Square, calling for a trial open to the public and the media (glasny sud), as required by the 1961 RSFSR Code of Criminal Procedure. The demonstration was one of the first organized actions by the civil right movement in the Soviet Union. Silent gatherings on that date became an annual event.

A similar demonstration followed in January 1967, when a group of young demonstrators protested against the recent arrests of samizdat authors, and against the introduction of new articles to the Criminal Code that restricted the right to protest.

Responding to the Soviet invasion of Czechoslovakia, on 25 August 1968 seven dissidents demonstrated on Red Square (1968 Red Square demonstration). (Note: CCE 3 (30 August 1968).) The participants were subsequently sentenced to terms of imprisonment in labor camps, banishment to Siberia or incarceration in psychiatric prison-hospitals. (Note: CCE 4.1 (30 October 1968), "The trial of the demonstrators on Red Square.")

On 30 October 1974, dissidents initiated a Day of the Political Prisoner in the USSR, intended to raise awareness of the existence and conditions of political prisoners throughout the Soviet Union. (Note: CCE 33.1 (10 December 1974), "Political Prisoners' Day in the USSR.") It was marked by hunger strikes in prisons and labor camps, and became an annual event marked by political prisoners in labor camps.

=== Civic watch groups ===
Starting with the Action (Initiative) Group formed in 1969 by 15 dissidents and the Committee on Human Rights in the USSR founded in 1970 by Andrei Sakharov, early Soviet human rights groups legitimized their work by referring to the principles enshrined in the Soviet constitution and to international agreements.

These attempts were later succeeded by the more successful Moscow Helsinki Group (founded 1977). The group as well as the watch groups modeled after it brought the human rights dissidents to increased international attention.

The dissident civil and human rights groups were faced with harsh repressions, with most members facing imprisonment, punitive psychiatry, or exile.

=== Mutual aid for prisoners of conscience ===
Families of arrested dissidents often suffered repercussions such as the loss of jobs and opportunities to study. Relatives and friends of political prisoners supported each other through informal networks of volunteers. From 1974 on, this support was bolstered by the Solzhenitsyn Aid Fund set up by the expelled dissident writer Aleksandr Solzhenitsyn. Despite limited resources and a crackdown by the KGB, it was used to distribute funds and material support to the prisoners' families.

== Background ==
In the wake of Nikita Khrushchev's 1956 "Secret Speech" condemning crimes of Stalinism and the following relative political relaxation (Khrushchev Thaw), several events and factors formed the background for a dissident movement focused on civil and human rights.

=== Mayakovsky Square poetry readings ===
A major impulse for the current of dissent later known as the civil or human rights movement came from individuals concerned with literary and cultural freedom. During 1960-61 and again in 1965, public poetry readings in Moscow's Mayakovsky Square (Mayakovsky Square poetry readings) served as a platform for politically charged literary dissent. Provoking measures ranging from expulsions from universities to lengthy labor camp terms for some of the participants, the regular meetings served as an incubator for many protagonists of the human rights movement, including writer Alexander Ginzburg and student Vladimir Bukovsky.

=== Dissidents in the mid-1960s ===
By the mid-1960s, dissenting voices in the Soviet Union also included movements of nations that had been deported under Stalin, religious movements that opposed the anti-religious state directives, and other groups such as reform communists and independent unions.

Some later human rights activists came from a circle of reform communists around Pyotr Grigorenko, a Ukrainian army general who fell out of favor in the early 1960s. The Crimean Tatars, an ethnic group who had been deported under Stalin and who had formed a movement petitioning to return to their homeland, would serve as an inspiration for the human rights activists, and their leader Mustafa Dzhemilev was later active in the broader human rights movement. Others who made an impact on the future movement were religious activists, such as Russian Orthodox priest Gleb Yakunin, who penned an influential open letter to the Patriarch of Moscow Alexius I in 1965, arguing that the Church must be liberated from the total control of the Soviet state.

The civil and human rights initiatives of the 1960s and 1970s managed to consolidate such different currents within the dissident spectrum by focusing on issues of freedom of expression, freedom of conscience, freedom to emigrate, and political prisoners. The movement became informed by "an idea of civic protest as an existentialist act, one not burdened with any political connotations."

== History ==
=== Emergence of "defenders of rights" ===
The circle of human rights activists in the Soviet Union formed as a result of several events in 1966–68. Marking the end of Khrushchev's relative liberalism (Khrushchev Thaw) and the beginning of the Brezhnev epoch (Brezhnev stagnation), these years saw an increase in political repression. A succession of writers and dissidents warning against a return to Stalinism were put on trial, and the beginnings of political liberalization reforms in the Czechoslovak Socialist Republic (Prague Spring) were crushed with military force.

Critically minded individuals reacted by petitioning against abuses and documenting them in samizdat (underground press) publications, and a small group turned towards protesting openly and eventually began to appeal to the international community. Those who insisted on protesting rights violations became known as "defenders of rights" (pravozashchitniki). Avoiding moral and political commentary in favor of close attention to legal and procedural issues, they demanded that the existing laws and rights formally guaranteed by the Soviet state be observed. This approach became a common cause for diverse social groups in the dissident milieu, ranging from academics to activists in the youth subculture.

==== Sinyavsky-Daniel trial (1966) – First rights-defense activity ====
In the mid-1960s, a number of writers who warned of a return to Stalinism were put on trial. One such a case was the 1966 trial of Yuli Daniel and Andrei Sinyavsky, two writers who had published satirical writings under pseudonyms in the West. They were sentenced to seven years in a labor camp for "anti-Soviet agitation". The trial was perceived by many in the intelligentsia as a return to previous Soviet show trials. It provoked a number of demonstrations and petition campaigns, mostly in Moscow and Leningrad, which emphasizes issues of creative freedom and the historical role of the writer in Russian society.

[Volpin] would explain to anyone who cared to listen a simple but unfamiliar idea: all laws ought to be understood in exactly the way they are written and not as they are interpreted by the government and the government ought to fulfil those laws to the letter [...]. What would happen if citizens acted on the assumption that they have rights? If one person did it, he would become a martyr; if two people did it, they would be labelled an enemy organization; if thousands of people did it, the state would have to become less oppressive.

— Lyudmila Alexeyeva on the approach spearheaded by Alexander Esenin-Volpin

In December 1965, the Sinyavsky-Daniel case motivated a small current of dissidents who decided to focus the legality of the trial. Mathematician Alexander Esenin-Volpin with the help of writer Yuri Galanskov and student Vladimir Bukovsky organized an unsanctioned rally on Pushkin Square ("glasnost meeting"). The demonstrators demanded an open trial for the writers as formally guaranteed by the Soviet Constitution. A "Civic Appeal" distributed through samizdat informed potential demonstrators of the rights being violated in the case and informed them of the possibility of formally legal protest.

Such focus on openly invoking rights was seen by many fellow dissidents to be utopian, and the demonstration as ineffective, carrying the risk of arrest, the loss of careers or imprisonment. Nevertheless, the approach was taken up by other dissenting individuals such as Bukovsky, who organized a protest against the introduction of new articles to the Criminal Code he considered unconstitutional, and invoked the Criminal Code and the Soviet Constitution at his own trial in September 1967.

Following the trial of Sinyavsky and Daniel, writers Alexander Ginzburg and Yuri Galanskov, who had previously edited a number of underground poetry anthologies, compiled documents relating to the trial in a samizdat collection called The White Book (1966). Signaling that he considered this activity to be legal, Ginzburg sent a copy to the KGB, the Communist Party Central Committee as well as to publishers abroad.

==== Trial of the Four (1967) – Increased protests and samizdat ====
In 1967, Alexander Ginzburg and Yuri Galanskov were detained along with two other dissidents and charged with "anti-Soviet agitation" for their work on The White Book. Ginzburg was sentenced to five years, Galanskov to seven years in labor camps. Their trial became another landmark in the rights-defense movement and motivated renewed protest (Trial of the Four).

In January 1967, a protest was organized against the arrest of Ginzburg and Galanskov, and against the introduction new laws classifying public gatherings or demonstrations as a crime. Vladimir Bukovsky, Vadim Delaunay, Victor Khaustov and Evgeny Kushev were arrested for organizing and taking part. At his own closed trial in September 1967, Bukovsky used his final words to attack the regime's failure to respect the law or follow legal procedures in its conduct of the case. His final words in court circulated widely in samizdat and became part of a collection of materials about the case by Pavel Litvinov.

The judicial trial of [Yuri] Galanskov, [Aleksandr] Ginzburg, [Alexey] Dobrovolsky and [Vera] Lashkova, which is taking place at present in the Moscow City Court, is being carried out in violation of the most important principles of Soviet law. [...] We pass this appeal to the Western progressive press, and ask for it to be published and broadcast by radio as soon as possible. We are not sending this request to Soviet newspapers because that is hopeless.

— Appeal to "To World Public Opinion" by Larisa Bogoraz and Pavel Litvinov

Over the course of 1967 and 1968, the Trial of the Four motivated a renewed wave of podpisanty (signatories), individuals who signed a series of petitions against repression and re-Stalinization. By this time, the signing of such letters was done at considerable personal risk: Signatories faced demotion or dismissal from work; party members faced expulsion and hindered careers.

In January 1968, linguist Larisa Bogoraz (wife of imprisoned writer Yuli Daniel) and physics teacher Pavel Litvinov wrote an open letter protesting the trial of Ginzburg and Galanskov. The appeal departed from the accepted tradition of addressing appeals to Soviet officials and became the first direct appeal by dissidents to the international public. Reminding readers of the terror of Stalinism, Bogoraz and Litvinov listed in great detail the violations of law and justice committed during the trial, and asked the Soviet and world public to demand that the prisoners be released from custody and that the trial be repeated in the presence of international observers. The document was signed with their full names and addresses.

==== 1968 Red Square demonstration (1968) ====
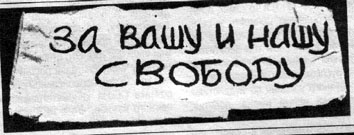
"For your freedom and ours", one of banners of the demonstrators, 1968

In August 1968, the Prague Spring became the second major development from which the human rights movement emerged. For many members of the intelligentsia, Alexander Dubček's political liberalization reforms were connected with the hope for a decline in repressions and a "socialism with a human face". In August 1968, the Soviet Union and its main allies in the Warsaw Pact invaded the Czechoslovak Socialist Republic in order to halt the reforms.

On 25 August 1968, seven dissidents demonstrated on Moscow's Red Square against the Soviet invasion of Czechoslovakia (1968 Red Square demonstration). All participants were arrested. None of the participants plead guilty, and they were subsequently sentenced to labor camps or of psychiatric imprisonment. Poet Natalya Gorbanevskaya collected testimonies on the demonstration as Noon (1968) before her incarceration in 1970.

=== First organized human rights activism ===
==== A Chronicle of Current Events (1968–1982) ====
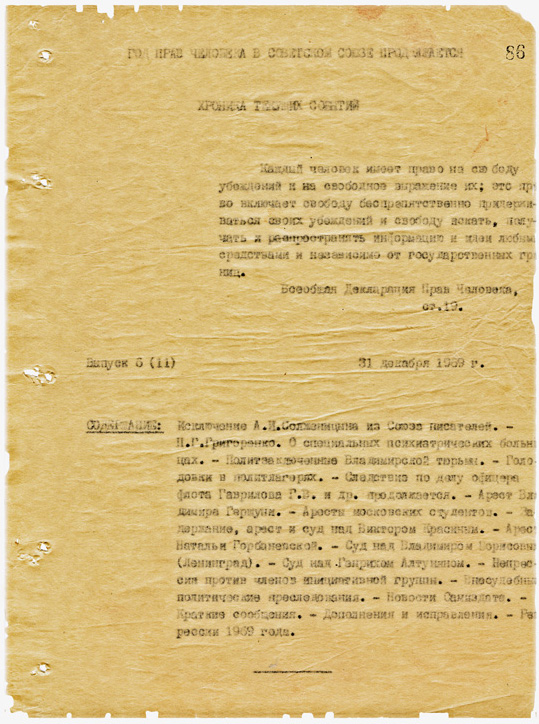
Chronicle of Current Events No 5, 31 December 1968 (front cover)

As a result of contacts between family members of political prisoners and the increased samizdat activity in the wake of trials, critically minded adults and youngsters in Moscow (later they would be known as dissidents) were confronted by a growing range of information about ongoing political repression in the Soviet Union.

In April 1968, marking the declared International Human Rights Year by the United Nations, anonymous editors in Moscow released the first issue of the Chronicle of Current Events. The typewritten samizdat bulletin adopted a documentary style and reported the activities of dissenters, the appearance of new samizdat (underground) publications, the repressive measures of the Soviet State, and conditions within the penitentiary system. Every successive issue of the Chronicle carried the words of Article 19 of the 1948 UN Universal Declaration of Human Rights on its first page:

"Everyone has the right to freedom of opinion and expression; this right includes freedom to hold opinions without interference and to seek, receive and impart information and ideas through any media and regardless of frontiers."

Over the 15 years of its existence, the Chronicle expanded its coverage to include every form of repression against the constituent nations, confessional and ethnic groups of the Union of Soviet Socialist Republics. It served as the backbone of the human rights movement in the Soviet Union. Despite harsh crackdowns (such as the KGB's "Case No. 24") and the imprisonment of many of its editors, more than sixty issues of the Chronicle would be compiled and circulated (published) between April 1968 to August 1983.

While Issue 1 was a short publication, focused mainly on the January 1968 trial of Alexander Ginzburg and Yury Galanskov and public reactions to those closed judicial hearings in Moscow, the last published (circulated) and translated issue, No 64, was over one hundred pages long and its contents listed trials, arrests and the protests and conditions in and outside labour camps, prisons and psychiatric hospitals all over the Soviet Union.

==== The Action Group; the Committee; the Soviet section of Amnesty International (1969–1979) ====
While the early human rights movement was dominated by individual activists, the end of the 1960s saw the appearance of the first civil and human rights organizations in the Soviet Union.

The formation of these groups broke a taboo on organized public activity by non-state structures.

The Soviet press routinely attacked dissidents for tenuous links to émigré organisations like the Frankfurt-based NTS or National Alliance of Russian Solidarists. It seemed self-evident that the State would respond to the creation of an organization within the USSR by immediately arresting all of its members. The new organizations legitimized their work by referring to principles enshrined in the current Soviet Constitution (1936) and, for the first time, by appealing to international agreements (to some of which the USSR would in time become a signatory). Each new organisation took particular care to emphasize the legality of its actions.

- The Initiative (or Action) Group for Human Rights in the USSR was founded in May 1969 by Soviet dissidents to unify existing human rights circles and began its activities with a petition to the UN Commission on Human Rights and other international bodies on behalf of the victims of Soviet repression. It included key figures from the rights defense bulletin Chronicle of Current Events two members from Ukraine (Altunyan and Plyushch) and the young Crimean Tatar activist Mustafa Dzhemilev in Tashkent. By May 1970, six of the fifteen original members were arrested or exiled and in the years that followed more would be forced into emigration. The group never officially disbanded, but its last free member Tatyana Velikanova was arrested in 1979 and imprisoned the following year.
- The Committee on Human Rights in the USSR was founded in November 1970 by Andrei Sakharov together with physicists Andrei Tverdokhlebov and Valery Chalidze. It aimed to apply a more scholarly approach, exploring the application of human rights in a socialist context and was centered upon Chalidze's samizdat journal Social Problems. The Committee publicized human rights violations, collected signatures for petitions, attended trials and succeeded in affiliating with several international human rights organizations. In December 1972 Tverdokhlebov resigned from the Committee "for strictly private reasons"; Chalidze also resigned then as one of the committee's consultants after being stripped of his Soviet citizenship while on a lecture tour of the US.
- The Soviet section of Amnesty International was founded in October 1973 by a group of 11 intellectuals including Andrei Tverdokhlebov, Valentin Turchin, Yuri Orlov, Sergei Kovalev, in the same month as the USSR ratified the International Covenant on Civil and Political Rights. It was registered in September 1974 by the Amnesty International Secretariat in London.

=== Crisis and international recognition (1972–1975) ===
In 1972, the KGB initiated "Case 24", a wide-ranging crackdown intended to suppress the Chronicle of Current Events. Accused of "anti-Soviet agitation and propaganda", two of the arrested editors, Petr Yakir and Victor Krasin, began to collaborate with their interrogators. Over two hundred dissidents were called for interrogation and the two men appeared on national TV, expressing regret for their past activities. There would be further arrests, threatened the KGB, for every issue of the Chronicle published after the TV broadcast. Although material was gathered and edited as before, circulation of the Chronicle of Current Events was suspended in the fall of 1972 and did not resume until May 1974. As many of the bulletin's contributors and editors were closely linked to the Initiative Group for Human Rights in the USSR, the crackdown also lead to sentences for several of its members.

Here in this speech I should just like to mention the names of some of the internees I am acquainted with. As you were told yesterday, I would ask you to remember that all prisoners of conscience and all political prisoners in my country share with me the honor of the Nobel Prize. Here are some of the names that are known to me: ...

Plyushch, Bukovsky, Glusman, Moros, Maria Seminoova, Nadeshda Svetlishnaya, Stefania Shabatura, Irina Klynets-Stasiv, Irina Senik, Niyola Sadunaite, Anait Karapetian, Osipov, Kronid Ljubarsky, Shumuk, Vins, Rumachek, Khaustov, Superfin, Paulaitis, Simutis, Karavanskiy, Valery Martshenko, Shuchevich, Pavlenkov, Chernoglas, Abanckin, Suslenskiy, Meshener, Svetlichny, Sofronov, Rode, Shakirov, Heifetz, Afanashev, Mo-Chun, Butman, Łukianenko, Ogurtsov, Sergeyenko, Antoniuk, Lupynos, Ruban, Plachotniuk, Kovgar, Belov, Igrunov, Soldatov, Miattik, Kierend, Jushkevich, Zdorovyy, Tovmajan, Shachverdjan, Zagrobian, Arikian, Markoshan, Arshakian, Mirauskas, Stus, Sverstiuk, Chandyba, Uboshko, Romaniuk, Vorobiov, Gel, Pronjuk, Gladko, Malchevsky, Grazis, Prishliak, Sapeliak, Kolynets, Suprei, Valdman, Demidov, Bernitshuk, Shovkovy, Gorbatiov, Berchov, Turik, Ziukauskas, Bolonkin, Lisovoi, Petrov, Chekalin, Gorodetsky, Chernovol, Balakonov, Bondar, Kalintchenko, Kolomin, Plumpa, Jaugelis, Fedoseyev, Osadchij, Budulak-Sharigin, Makarenko, Malkin, Shtern, Lazar Liubarsky, Feldman, Roitburt, Shkolnik, Murzienko, Fedorov, Dymshits, Kuznetsov, Mendelevich, Altman, Penson, Knoch, Vulf Zalmanson, Izrail Zalmanson, and many, many others.

— Andrei Sakharov, Peace, Progress, Human Rights (Nobel Lecture, December 11, 1975)

Faced with the imminent publication of English and French translations of The Gulag Archipelago, the Soviet leadership decided to arrest Alexandr Solzhenitsyn, strip him of his Soviet citizenship and deport him in February 1974 to West Germany. Drawing on the royalties from sales of The Gulag Archipelago, Solzhenitsyn set up a fund in Switzerland (Solzhenitsyn Aid Fund) and with the help of Alexander Ginzburg money was distributed across the Soviet Union to political and religious prisoners and their families.

In September 1974, the Soviet section of Amnesty International was registered by the Amnesty International Secretariat in London.

In December 1975 Andrei Sakharov was awarded the Nobel Peace prize "for his struggle for human rights, for disarmament, and for cooperation between all nations". He was not allowed to leave the Soviet Union to collect it. His speech was read by his wife Yelena Bonner at the ceremony in Oslo, Norway. On the day the prize was awarded, Sakharov was in Vilnius, demanding admission to the trial of human rights activist Sergei Kovalev. In his Nobel lecture, titled "Peace, Progress, Human Rights", Sakharov included a list of prisoners of conscience and political prisoners in the USSR, stating that he shared the prize with them.

=== Helsinki period (1975–1981) ===
In August 1975, during the Conference on Security and Cooperation in Europe (CSCE) in Helsinki, Finland, the eight member countries of the Warsaw Pact became co-signatories of the Helsinki Final Act (Helsinki Accords). Despite efforts to exclude the clauses, the Soviet government ultimately accepted a text containing unprecedented commitments to human rights as part of diplomatic relations between the signatories.

Word on the contents of the Helsinki Final Acts began to spread through Western broadcasts by the BBC and Radio Liberty. Presented as a diplomatic triumph of the Soviet Union, the text of the document was also reprinted in Pravda.

Of particular interest for dissidents across the Soviet bloc was the "Third Basket" of the Final Act. According to it, the signatories had to "respect human rights and fundamental freedoms, including freedom of thought, conscience, religion or belief." The signatories also confirmed "the right of the individual to know and act upon his rights and duties in this field."

==== Founding of Helsinki watch groups ====
In the years 1976-77 members of the dissident movement formed several "Helsinki Watch Groups" in different cities to monitor the Soviet Union's compliance with the Helsinki Final Act:

- The Moscow Helsinki Group was founded in May 1976 by physicist Yuri Orlov. Despite severe repressions, it played a great role in East-West relations, revealing Soviet non-compliance with the Helsinki Final Act such as the continued political abuse of psychiatry.
- A special Working Commission on the Use of Psychiatry for Political Purposes was founded in January 1977 under the aegis of the Moscow Helsinki Group. It was advised by psychiatrists and jurists, and continued its work until its last member was arrested in 1981.

Following the example, other groups were formed:

- The Ukrainian Helsinki Group was founded in November 1976 to monitor human rights in the Ukrainian SSR. The group was active until 1981, when all members were jailed.
- The Lithuanian Helsinki Group was founded in November 1976 to monitor human rights in the Lithuanian SSR. It ceased to exist in 1982 as a result of arrests, deaths, and emigration.
- The Georgian Helsinki Group was founded in January 1977 to monitor human rights in the Georgian SSR. It was active until the arrest and trial of several members of the group in 1977–1978. It was restarted in the spring of 1985 and eventually became the political party Georgian Helsinki Union, headed by Zviad Gamsakhurdia.
- The Armenian Helsinki Group was founded in April 1977. In addition to monitoring the observance of the Helsinki Accords in the Armenian SSR, it intended to seek the Republic's acceptance as a member of the United Nations and the unification with Armenia of Nagorny Karabakh and Nakhichevanik. In December 1977 two members of the Group were arrested and its activity ceased.

Similar initiatives began in Soviet satellite states, such as the informal civic initiative Charter 77 in the Czechoslovak Socialist Republic and the Workers' Defence Committee, later Committee for Social Defense, in Poland.

==== Impact and persecution of Helsinki watch groups ====
Materials provided by the Helsinki groups were used at the follow-up Belgrade conference on verification of the Helsinki accords on 4 October 1977. The conference became the first international meeting on a governmental level in which the Soviet Union was accused of human rights violations. In January 1979, the Commission on Security and Cooperation in Europe nominated the Helsinki Groups of the Soviet Union for the Nobel Peace Prize.

In 1977-1979 and again in 1980–1982, the KGB reacted to the Helsinki Watch Groups by launching large-scale arrests and sentencing its members to in prison, labor camp, internal exile and psychiatric imprisonment.

During the 1970s the Moscow and the Ukrainian Helsinki Groups managed to recruit new members after an initial wave of arrests. The Ukrainian group also had representatives abroad, with Leonid Plyushch in France and Nadiya Svitlychna, Pyotr Grigorenko and Nina Strokata in the United States.

In the early 1980s, with the Soviet Union's international reputation damaged by the invasion of Afghanistan, persecution of dissidents and human rights activists intensified. This spelled the end of the groups that were still active at the time. By the early 1980s, the Moscow Helsinki Group was scattered in prisons, camps and exile. When the 74-year-old attorney Sofya Kalistratova was threatened with arrest in Moscow in 1982, the last remaining members of the Moscow group who had not been arrested announced the dissolution of the group. In Lithuania, four members of the Helsinki group were incarcerated, and an additional member, the priest Bronius Laurinavičius, was killed. The Ukrainian Helsinki Group, although faced with some of the heaviest losses, never formally disbanded. In the early 1980s, when 18 members of the Ukrainian group were incarcerated in the forced labor camp near Kuchino in the Urals alone, the Ukrainian group stated that its activities had been "displaced" to the camps.

=== Late Soviet Union (1980-1992) ===
In 1980, Andrei Sakharov was forcibly exiled from Moscow to the closed city of Gorky to live under KGB surveillance and to disrupt his contact with activists and foreign journalists. His wife Yelena Bonner was permitted to travel between Moscow and Gorky. With her help, Sakharov was able to send appeals and essays to the West until 1984 when she was also arrested and confined by court order to Gorky.

The death Anatoly Marchenko, a founding member of the Moscow Helsinki Group, in prison after months on hunger strike in 1986 caused an international outcry. It marked a turning point in the initial insistence of Mikhail Gorbachev that there were no political prisoners in the USSR.

In 1986, Mikhail Gorbachev, who had initiated the policies of perestroika and glasnost, called Sakharov to tell him that he and his wife could return to Moscow.

In the late 1980s, with glasnost and perestroika underway, some of the Helsinki watch groups resumed their work. With the return of the first Ukrainian group members from the camps, they resumed their work for a democratic Ukraine in 1987. Their group later became the nucleus for a number of political parties and democratic initiatives. The Moscow Helsinki Group resumed its activities in 1989 and continues to operate today.

== Legal context ==
=== Civil and human rights frameworks ===
The emerging civil rights movement of the mid-1960s turned its attention to the guarantees enshrined in the Soviet constitution:

- 1936 Soviet Constitution, in force until 1977
- 1977 Soviet Constitution, in force until the dissolution of the Soviet Union
- 1961 RSFSR Code of Criminal Procedure

The human rights movement from the 1970s turned its attention to international agreements:

- 1948 U.N. Universal Declaration of Human Rights (Note: The USSR and other countries of the Soviet bloc had abstained from voting on the 1948 U.N. Universal Declaration of Human Rights, citing its "overly juridical" character as well as the infringements on national sovereignty that it might enable. The USSR and some of its allies did, however, sign the 1966 International Covenant on Economic, Social and Cultural Rights and the International Covenant on Civil and Political Rights.)
- 1975 Helsinki Final Act, and its "Third Basket" containing human rights clauses, signed by the USSR

Existing human rights guarantees were neither well known to people living under Communist rule nor taken seriously by the Communist authorities. In addition, Western governments did not emphasize human rights ideas in the early détente period.

=== Persecution ===
While the authors of the samizdat bulletin Chronicle of Current Events and the members of the various human rights groups maintained that their activity was not illegal, several articles of the RSFSR Criminal Code were routinely used against activists in the movement:

- Article 70 – anti-Soviet agitation and propaganda – punished the creation and circulation of "slanderous fabrications that target the Soviet political and social system". Its penalty was up to 7 years of imprisonment followed by up to 5 years of internal exile.
- Article 72 introduced the capital offense of "organizational activity directed to the commission of especially dangerous crimes against the state and also participation in an anti-Soviet organization"
- Article 227 punished creation or participation in a religious group that "induces citizens to refuse social activity or performance of civic duties".

Two articles were added to the Criminal Code in September 1966 in the wake of the Sinyasky-Daniel trial:

- Article 190-1 punished "systematic dissemination of deliberately false statements derogatory to the Soviet state and social system"
- Article 190-3 punished "group activities involving a grave breach of public order, or disobedience to the legitimate demands of representatives of authority"

Another article was introduced in October 1983:

- Article 188-3 allowed the state to extend the terms of convicts, facilitating the ongoing persecution of political prisoners

Prior to 1960 and the introduction of the new RSFSR Criminal Article 58 described the capital offense of knowingly or unknowingly participating in an organization deemed "counter-revolutionary". It was not retained after 1960, but it was used to prosecute and imprison several older rights activists (for instance, Vladimir Gershuni) in the Stalin and Khrushchev years.

== See also ==
- Soviet dissidents
- Human rights in the Soviet Union
- Category:Soviet human rights activists
- Charter 77
- Human rights in Russia
