= Human rights in the Soviet Union =

Human rights in the Soviet Union were severely limited. The Soviet Union was a totalitarian state from 1927 until 1953 and a one-party state until 1990. Freedom of speech was suppressed and dissent was punished. Independent political activities were not tolerated, whether they involved participation in free labor unions, private corporations, independent churches or opposition political parties. The citizens' freedom of movement was limited both inside and outside the country.

In practice, the Soviet government significantly curbed the very powerful rule of law, civil liberties, protection of law and guarantees of property, which were considered examples of "bourgeois morality" by Soviet legal theorists such as Andrey Vyshinsky. The Soviet Union signed legally-binding human rights documents, such as the International Covenant on Civil and Political Rights in 1973, but they were neither widely known or accessible to people living under Communist rule, nor were they taken seriously by the Communist authorities. Human rights activists in the Soviet Union were regularly subjected to harassment, repressions and arrests.

== Soviet concept of human rights and legal system ==
According to the Universal Declaration of Human Rights, human rights are the "basic rights and freedoms to which all humans are entitled." including the right to life and liberty, freedom of expression, and equality before the law; and social, cultural and economic rights, including the right to participate in culture, the right to food, the right to work, and the right to education.

The Soviet conception of human rights was very different from international law. According to Soviet legal theory, "it is the government who is the beneficiary of human rights which are to be asserted against the individual". The Soviet state was considered as the source of human rights. Therefore, the Soviet legal system considered law an arm of politics and it also considered courts agencies of the government. Extensive extrajudicial powers were given to the Soviet secret police agencies. In practice, the Soviet government significantly curbed the rule of law, civil liberties, protection of law and guarantees of property, which were considered as examples of "bourgeois morality" by Soviet law theorists such as Andrey Vyshinsky.

The USSR and other countries in the Soviet Bloc had abstained from affirming the Universal Declaration of Human Rights (1948), saying that it was "overly juridical" and potentially infringed on national sovereignty. The Soviet Union later signed legally-binding human rights documents, such as the International Covenant on Civil and Political Rights in 1973 (and the 1966 International Covenant on Economic, Social and Cultural Rights), but they were neither widely known or accessible to people living under Communist rule, nor were they taken seriously by the Communist authorities. Under Joseph Stalin, the death penalty was extended to adolescents as young as 12 years old in 1935.

Sergei Kovalev recalled "the famous article 125 of the Constitution which enumerated all basic civil and political rights" in the Soviet Union. But when he and other prisoners attempted to use this as a legal basis for their abuse complaints, their prosecutor's argument was that "the Constitution was written not for you, but for American Negroes, so that they know how happy the lives of Soviet citizens are".

Crime was determined not as the infraction of law, instead, it was determined as any action which could threaten the Soviet state and society. For example, a desire to make a profit could be interpreted as a counter-revolutionary activity punishable by death. The liquidation and deportation of millions of peasants in 1928–31 was carried out within the terms of the Soviet Civil Code. Some Soviet legal scholars even said that "criminal repression" may be applied in the absence of guilt. Martin Latsis, chief of Soviet Ukraine's secret police explained: "Do not look in the file of incriminating evidence to see whether or not the accused rose up against the Soviets with arms or words. Ask him instead to which class he belongs, what is his background, his education, his profession. These are the questions that will determine the fate of the accused. That is the meaning and essence of the Red Terror."

The purpose of public trials was "not to demonstrate the existence or absence of a crime – that was predetermined by the appropriate party authorities – but to provide yet another forum for political agitation and propaganda for the instruction of the citizenry (see Moscow Trials for example). Defense lawyers, who had to be party members, were required to take their client's guilt for granted..."

== Freedom of political expression ==
In the 1930s and 1940s, political repression was widely practiced by the Soviet secret police services, OGPU and NKVD. An extensive network of civilian informants – either volunteers, or those forcibly recruited – was used to collect intelligence for the government and report cases of suspected dissent.

Its theoretical basis was the theory of Marxism concerning class struggle. The terms "repression", "terror", and other strong words were official working terms, since the dictatorship of the proletariat was supposed to suppress the resistance of other social classes, which Marxism considered antagonistic to the class of the proletariat. The legal basis of the repression was formalized into Article 58 in the code of the RSFSR and similar articles for other Soviet republics. Aggravation of class struggle under socialism was proclaimed during the Stalinist terror.

== Freedom of literary and scientific expression ==
Censorship in the Soviet Union was pervasive and strictly enforced. This gave rise to Samizdat, a clandestine copying and distribution of government-suppressed literature. Art, literature, education, and science were placed under strict ideological scrutiny, since they were supposed to serve the interests of the victorious proletariat. Socialist realism is an example of such teleologically oriented art that promoted socialism and communism. All humanities and social sciences were tested for strict accordance with historical materialism.

All natural sciences were to be founded on the philosophical base of dialectical materialism. Many scientific disciplines, such as genetics, cybernetics, and comparative linguistics, were suppressed in the Soviet Union during some periods, condemned as "bourgeois pseudoscience". At one point Lysenkoism, which many consider a pseudoscience, was favored in agriculture and biology. In the 1930s and 1940s, many prominent scientists were declared to be "wreckers" or enemies of the people and imprisoned. Some scientists worked as prisoners in "Sharashkas" (research and development laboratories within the Gulag labor camp system).

According to the Soviet Criminal Code, agitation or propaganda carried on for the purpose of weakening Soviet authority, or circulating materials or literature that defamed the Soviet State and social system were punishable by imprisonment for a term of 2–5 years; for a second offense, punishable for a term of 3–10 years.

== Right to vote ==
According to communist ideologists, the Soviet political system was a true democracy, where workers' councils ("soviets") represented the will of the working class. In particular, the Soviet Constitution of 1936 guaranteed direct universal suffrage with a secret ballot. Practice, however, departed from principle. For example, all candidates were selected by Communist Party organizations, until democratization and the March 1989 elections. Historian Robert Conquest described the Soviet electoral system as "a set of phantom institutions and arrangements which put a human face on the hideous realities: a model constitution adopted in a worst period of terror and guaranteeing human rights, elections in which there was only one candidate, and in which 99 percent voted; a parliament at which no hand was ever raised in opposition or abstention."

== Economic rights ==
Personal property was allowed with limitations. Real property mostly belonged to the State. Many forms of private trade with the intent of gaining profit were considered "speculation" (Russian: спекуляция) and banned as a criminal offense to be punished with fines, imprisonment, confiscation and/or corrective labor. "Speculation" was specifically defined in article 154 of the Penal Code of the USSR. Health, housing, education, and nutrition were formally guaranteed through the provision of full employment and economic welfare structures, but these guarantees were rarely met in practice. For instance, over five million people lacked adequate nutrition and starved to death during the Soviet famine of 1932–1933, one of several Soviet famines. The 1932–33 famine was caused primarily by Soviet-mandated collectivization, although the famine in part was also caused by natural conditions. In response to frequent shortages, massive second economy existed for all categories of goods and services.

== Freedoms of assembly and association ==
Workers were not allowed to organize free unions. All existing unions were organized and controlled by the state. All political youth organizations, such as Pioneer movement and Komsomol served to enforce the policies of the Communist Party. Participation in unauthorized political organizations could result in imprisonment. Organizing in camps could bring the death penalty.

== Freedom of religion ==
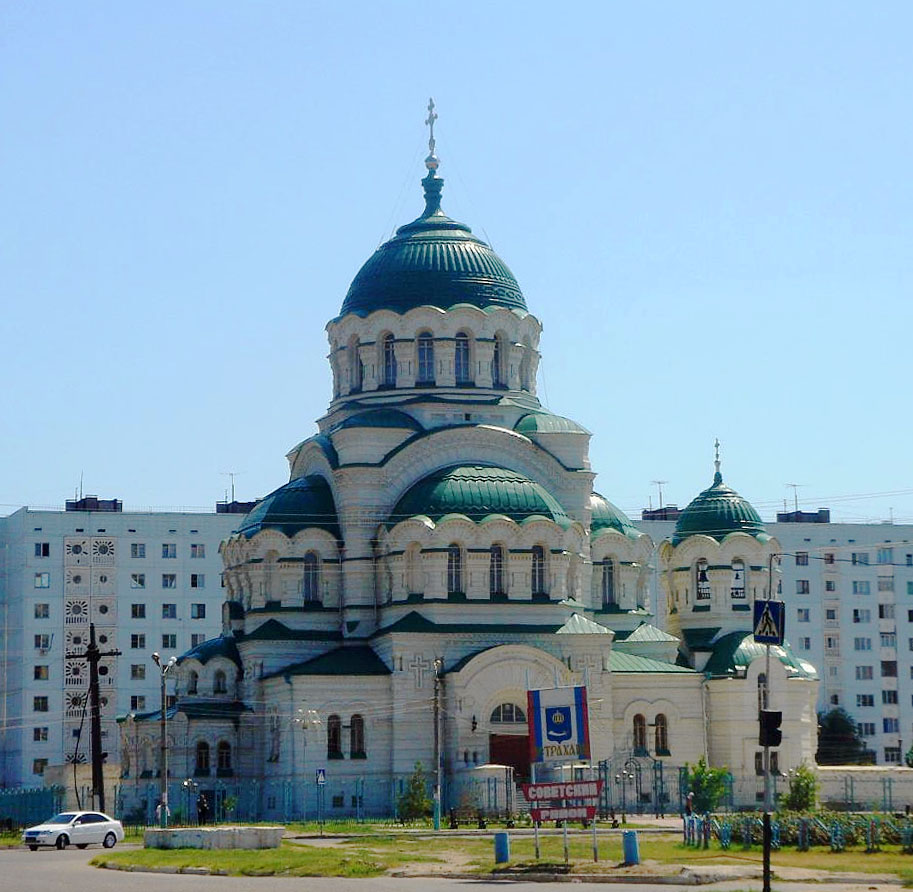
St. Vladimir's Cathedral in Astrakhan, which served as a bus station in Soviet times.

The Soviet Union promoted Marxist-Leninist atheism and persecuted religion. Toward that end, the Communist regime confiscated church property, ridiculed religion, harassed believers, and propagated atheism in the schools. Actions toward particular religions, however, were determined by State interests, and most organized religions were never outlawed outright.

Some actions against Orthodox priests and believers included torture; being sent to prison camps, labour camps, or mental hospitals; and execution. Many Orthodox (along with peoples of other faiths) were also subjected to psychological punishment or torture and mind control experimentation in an attempt to force them give up their religious convictions (see Punitive psychiatry in the Soviet Union).

Practicing Orthodox Christians were restricted from prominent careers and membership in communist organizations (e.g. the party and the Komsomol). Anti-religious propaganda was openly sponsored and encouraged by the government, to which the Church was not given an opportunity to publicly respond. Seminaries were closed down, and the church was restricted from publishing materials. Atheism was propagated through schools, communist organizations, and the media. Organizations such as the Society of the Godless were created.

== Freedom of movement ==
January 10, 1973. Jewish refuseniks demonstrate in front of the Ministry of Internal Affairs for the right to emigrate to Israel.

The passport system in the Soviet Union restricted migration of citizens within the country through the "propiska" (residential permit/registration system) and the use of internal passports. For a long period of Soviet history, peasants did not have internal passports, and could not move into towns without permission. Many former inmates received "wolf tickets" and were only allowed to live a minimum of 101 km away from city borders. Travel to closed cities and to the regions near USSR state borders was strongly restricted. An attempt to illegally escape abroad was punishable by imprisonment for 1–3 years.

== Human rights movement ==
Human rights activists in the Soviet Union were regularly subjected to harassment, repressions and arrests. In several cases, only the public profile of individual human rights campaigners such as Andrei Sakharov helped prevent a complete shutdown of the movement's activities.

A more organized human rights movement in the USSR grew out of the current of dissent of the late 1960s and 1970s known as "rights defenders (pravozashchitniki). Its most important samizdat publication, the Chronicle of Current Events, circulated its first number in April 1968, after the United Nations declared that it would be the International Year for Human Rights (20 years since Universal Declaration was issued), and continued for the next 15 years until closed down in 1983.

A succession of dedicated human rights groups were set up after 1968: the Action Group for the Defense of Human Rights in the USSR went public in May 1969 with an appeal to the UN Human Rights Committee; the Committee on Human Rights in the USSR was established in 1970; and a Soviet section of Amnesty International appeared in 1973. The groups variously wrote appeals, collected signatures for petitions, and attended trials.

The seven member countries of the Warsaw Pact signed the Helsinki Final Act in August 1975. The "third basket" of the Final Act included extensive human rights clauses. In the years 1976–77, several "Helsinki Watch Groups" emerged in the USSR, to monitor the Soviet Union's compliance with the Helsinki Final Act. The first group was the Moscow Helsinki Group, followed by groups in Ukraine, Lithuania, Georgia and Armenia. They succeeded in unifying different branches of the human rights movement. Similar initiatives began in Soviet satellite states, such as Charter 77 in the Czechoslovak Socialist Republic.

Over the next two years the Helsinki Groups would be harassed and threatened by the Soviet authorities and eventually forced to close down their activities, as leading activists were arrested, put on trial and imprisoned or pressured into leaving the country. By 1979, all had ceased to function.

== Perestroika and human rights ==
The period from April 1985 to December 1991 witnessed dramatic change in the USSR.

In February 1987 KGB Chairman Victor Chebrikov reported to Soviet General Secretary Mikhail Gorbachev that 288 people were serving sentences for offenses committed under Articles 70, 190-1 and 142 of the RSFSR Criminal Code; a third of those convicted were being held in psychiatric hospitals. Most were released during the course of the year, spurred on by the death in prison of veteran dissident Anatoly Marchenko in December 1986. Soon ethnic minorities, confessional groups and entire nations were asserting their rights, respectively, to cultural autonomy, freedom of religion and, led by the Baltic states, to national independence.

Just as glasnost did not represent "freedom of speech", so attempts by activists to hold their own events and create independent associations and political movements met with disapproval and obstruction from Gorbachev and his Politburo. Early in December 1987 Shevardnadze, Yakovlev and Chebrikov reported on a proposed human rights seminar to be held in Moscow on 10–14 December 1987 with guests from abroad, and suggested ways of undermining, restricting and containing the event organised by former Soviet dissidents. The reaction to a similar proposal seven months later was much the same. As they conceded more and more of the rights over which the Communists had established their monopoly in the 1920s, events and organisations not initiated or overseen by the regime were frowned on and discouraged by the supposedly liberal authorities of the brief and ambivalent period of perestroika and official glasnost.

In the remaining two and a half years the rate of change accelerated. The Congress of People's Deputies held its second autumnal session in 1989 during a nationwide miners' strike. One consequence was the abolition in March 1990 of Article 6 of the Soviet Constitution (1977), which had explicitly established the primacy of the Communist Party within the Soviet State, a hitherto unspoken but all-pervasive dominance of the system.

The authorities formed units of riot police OMON to deal with the mounting protests and rallies across the USSR. In Moscow, these culminated in a vast demonstration in January 1991, denouncing the actions of Gorbachev and his administration. The demonstrations in Lithuania, Tbilisi, Baku and Tajikistan have been suppressed resulting in deaths of many protesters.

== Human rights in the Post-Soviet states ==
- Armenia
- Azerbaijan
- Belarus
- Estonia
- (Georgia (country)) Georgia
- Kazakhstan
- Kyrgyzstan
- Latvia
- Lithuania
- Moldova
- Russia
- Tajikistan
- Turkmenistan
- Ukraine
- Uzbekistan

== See also ==
- Human rights movement in the Soviet Union
- Criticism of Communist party rule
- Human rights in Russia
- Racism in Russia
- Political repression in the Soviet Union

== Bibliography ==
- Denial of human rights to Jews in the Soviet Union: hearings, Ninety-second Congress, first session. May 17, 1971. U.S. Government Printing Office. 1971.
- Human rights–Ukraine and the Soviet Union: hearing and markup before the Committee on Foreign Affairs and its Subcommittee on Human Rights and International Organizations, House of Representatives, Ninety-seventh Congress, First Session, on H. Con. Res. 111, H. Res. 152, H. Res. 193, July 28, July 30, and September 17, 1981. U.S. Government Printing Office. 1982.
- "Human rights: the dissidents v. Moscow". Time. Vol. 109, no. 8. 21 February 1977. p. 28.
- Applebaum, Anne (2003) Gulag: A History. Broadway Books. ISBN 0-7679-0056-1
- Boim, Leon (1976). "Human rights in the USSR". Review of Socialist Law. 2 (1): 173–187. doi:10.1163/157303576X00157.
- Chalidze, Valeriĭ (1971). Important aspects of human rights in the Soviet Union; a report to the Human Rights Committee. New York: American Jewish Committee. OCLC 317422393.
- Chalidze, Valery (January 1973). "The right of a convicted citizen to leave his country". Harvard Civil Rights-Civil Liberties Law Review. 8 (1): 1–13.
- Conquest, Robert (1991) The Great Terror: A Reassessment. Oxford University Press ISBN 0-19-507132-8.
- Conquest, Robert (1986) The Harvest of Sorrow: Soviet Collectivization and the Terror-Famine. Oxford University Press. ISBN 0-19-505180-7.
- Daniel, Thomas (2001). The Helsinki effect: international norms, human rights, and the demise of communism. Princeton, N. J.: Princeton University Press. ISBN 9780691048598.
- Dean, Richard (January–March 1980). "Contacts with the West: the dissidents' view of Western support for the human rights movement in the Soviet Union". Universal Human Rights. 2 (1): 47–65. doi:10.2307/761802. JSTOR 761802.
- Fryer, Eugene (Spring 1979). "Soviet human rights: law and politics in perspective". Law and Contemporary Problems. 43 (2): 296–307. doi:10.2307/1191202. JSTOR 1191202.
- Graubert, Judah (October 1972). "Human rights problems in the Soviet Union". Journal of Intergroup Relations. 2 (2): 24–31.
- Johns, Michael (Fall 1987). "Seventy years of evil: Soviet crimes from Lenin to Gorbachev". Policy Review: 10–23.
- Khlevniuk, Oleg & Kozlov, Vladimir (2004) The History of the Gulag : From Collectivization to the Great Terror (Annals of Communism Series) Yale University Press. ISBN 0-300-09284-9.
- Samatan, Marie (1980). Droits de l'homme et répression en URSS: l'appareil et les victimes [Human rights and repression in the USSR: mechanism and victims] (in French). Paris: Seuil. ISBN 978-2020057059.
- Pipes, Richard (2001) Communism Weidenfled and Nicoloson. ISBN 0-297-64688-5
- Pipes, Richard (1994) Russia Under the Bolshevik Regime. Vintage. ISBN 0-679-76184-5.
- Rummel, R.J. (1996) Lethal Politics: Soviet Genocide and Mass Murder Since 1917. Transaction Publishers. ISBN 1-56000-887-3.
- Szymanski, Albert (1984). Human rights: the USA and the USSR compared. Lawrence Hill & Co. ISBN 978-0882081588.
- Yakovlev, Alexander (2004). A Century of Violence in Soviet Russia. Yale University Press. ISBN 0-300-10322-0.
