= Alexander Lavut =

Russian mathematician and dissident

Alexander P. Lavut
- Born: July 4, 1929
- Died: June 23, 2013 (aged 83)
- Education: Moscow State University
- Occupation: mathematician
- Known for: human rights activist, dissident
- Criminal charge: Anti-Soviet agitation and propaganda (Article 190-1 of the RSFSR Criminal Code)
- Criminal penalty: Three years in corrective-labour camps; three years' internal exile.
- Spouse: Sima Mostinskaya

Alexander Pavlovich Lavut (Russian: Алекса́ндр Па́влович Лаву́т; 4 July 1929 – 23 June 2013) was a mathematician, dissident and a key figure in the civil rights movement in the Soviet Union.

== Biography ==
Alexander Lavut was born on 4 July 1929, the son of entrepreneur Pavel Ilyich Lavut (1898–1979), an ebullient figure on the cultural scene of the Soviet 1920s, mentioned in the works of Vladimir Mayakovsky ("that soft-spoken Jew Lavut").

Alexander graduated in 1951 from the Mechanics and Mathematics faculty of Moscow State University. After graduation, he taught at secondary schools in the city, and in Kazakhstan. In 1966–1969, he worked at the Laboratory of Mathematical Geology at Moscow State University.

== Dissident activities ==
In 1968, like dozens of others, Lavut added his name to an open letter in defense of the poet Alexander Ginzburg. Ginzburg had been arrested as one of the compilers, with Yuri Galanskov, of the White Book documenting the trial of writers Andrei Sinyavsky and Yuli Daniel.

In May 1969 Lavut joined the Action Group for the Defense of Human Rights, the first such organization in Soviet history. Together with other members, he signed an open letter to the UN Human Rights Commission. He lost his job in November that year. Of Lavut's 14 co-signatories, ten would be arrested later and imprisoned.

Lavut also worked for the samizdat periodical A Chronicle of Current Events. Founded in April 1968, the Chronicle ran until 1983, producing 65 issues in 14 years. It documented the extensive human rights violations committed by the Soviet government and the ever-expanding samizdat publications (political tracts, fiction, translations) circulating among the critical and opposition-minded. Each issue was produced as a few dozen typewritten copies, passed on to friends and then replicated in the manner of a chain-letter.

After chief editor Sergei Kovalev was arrested in 1975 and imprisoned for his work on the Chronicle, Lavut became one of the principal editors, both as a contributor and in compiling and finalising the contents of many issues. This continued until his own arrest in 1980.

Lavut was particularly active in campaigning on behalf of the Crimean Tatars, an ethnic group forcibly exiled to Central Asia under Stalin in 1944 and not permitted to return once the Soviet dictator was dead. After their champion Pyotr Grigorenko was expelled from the USSR in 1977, Lavut became one of their main contacts in Moscow. He had already dedicated one entire issue of the Chronicle to their cause.

=== Arrest, imprisonment, and exile (1980–1986) ===
On 29 April 1980, Lavut was arrested and charged with Anti-Soviet agitation under Article 190-1 of the RSFSR Criminal Code: "the dissemination of knowingly false fabrications discrediting the Soviet social and political system". The prosecution argued that Lavut "participated in the discussion, production, signing and distribution on the territory of the USSR and abroad of knowingly false fabrications ... about alleged violations of civil rights, of the use of psychiatry for political ends." He was also accused of possessing and distributing copies of The Gulag Archipelago by Aleksandr Solzhenitsyn.

During his trial at the Moscow People's Court, Lavut admitted distributing material but claimed that his actions fell within the remit of the law. The trial became the subject of a memorandum by the dissident human rights organization Moscow Helsinki Group; Andrei Sakharov included Lavut's name in an open appeal to colleagues.

Convicted and sentenced to the maximum term under Article 190-1 of three years in a labour camp Lavut was held for some time in Butyrka prison (Moscow), before being sent to a camp in the Khabarovsk Region (Soviet Far East). When his initial sentence ended in April 1983, he was not released, but given a further three-year term of internal exile. In 1986 Lavut refused to sign a statement agreeing to cease all political activity (cf Tatyana Velikanova).

On completion of his term of exile Lavut was able to return to Moscow but not allowed to travel abroad. He resumed work as a programmer, this time at the Central Geophysical Expedition. In 1988, Andrei Sakharov succeeded in obtaining official permission for Lavut to join a Soviet-American commission on civil and political rights and go to Washington.

== Return to Moscow ==
Lavut became involved in a variety of initiatives that were now possible under Gorbachev's regime, although keeping always in the background.

He helped Sergei Kovalyov in his successful bid to enter the Soviet parliament. He joined Memorial, and served on its board. After Andrei Sakharov died in December 1989 he became a member of the Public Committee for the Preservation of Legacy of Andrei Sakharov, which led to the creation of the Sakharov Museum and Center in Moscow.

An opponent of Yeltsin's First Chechen War (1994–1996), Lavut was briefly detained in December 1994 during an unsanctioned picket of the presidential administration in Moscow's Old Square (Staraya ploshchad). In May the following year he joined an observer mission to the Chechen conflict zone sent by several human rights NGOs.

=== Death and tributes ===
Lavut died on 23 June 2013. In an obituary notice Alexander Podrabinek commented on his courage, modesty and compassion for others.

"Alexander Lavut was a member of the Action Group for the Defence of Human Rights, the first organisation in the USSR to openly defend such rights, yet he never boasted about having belonged to the oldest organisation of its kind in Russia.

"Lavut was among the editors of the legendary Chronicle of Current Events (1968–1983) but never regarded this worthy of mention.

"Twice convicted and imprisoned, he served consecutive sentences from 1980 to 1986, but never sought leniency or petitioned for a pardon. A model of irreproachable behaviour as a dissident, Alexander Lavut never criticised those who could not attain the same standard."

This view was shared and expressed in other obituaries, but especially in that signed by all the board members of Memorial.

Lavut was survived by his wife Sima Mostinskaya and their daughter in the USA. A second child committed suicide in the 1970s.

== See also ==
- Chronicle of Current Events
- samizdat
- Memorial
- Tatyana Velikanova
- Sergei Kovalev
