= Pyotr Yakir =

Soviet historian (1923-1982)

Pyotr Ionavich Yakir
- Пётр Ионавич Якир
- Born: 20 January 1923; Moscow, Soviet Union
- Died: 14 November 1982 (aged 59)
- Resting place: Vvedenskoye Cemetery
- Citizenship: Soviet
- Education: Moscow Historic-Archival Institute
- Occupations: Historian, civil rights activist
- Known for: His participation in Soviet dissident movement and struggle against political abuse of psychiatry in the Soviet Union
- Movement: the dissident and human rights movements in the Soviet Union

Pyotr Ionavich Yakir (Russian: Пётр Ионавич Якир) (20 January 1923 – 14 November 1982) was a Soviet historian who survived a childhood in the Gulag, and became well known as a critic of Stalinism, though ultimately he denounced dissident activity in the Soviet Union.

== Career ==
Pyotr Yakir was born in Kiev, the son of the renowned Red Army commander Iona Yakir and Sarah Yakir, née Ortenberg. His father was arrested on 31 May 1937. On that day, agents of the NKVD searched the family home. On 7 June, Sarah Yakir was ordered to leave Kiev within 24 hours. On 12 June, he learnt from the newspapers that his father had been shot. He, his mother and younger brother were exiled to Astrakhan, where her father joined them.

=== Political prisoner ===
Pyotr was arrested on 18 September 1937, 'as a socially dangerous element', and was sentenced to five years in a labour camp when still only 14 years old. His mother was also arrested, and his brother was sent to a children's home. His repeated attempts to escape failed. He suffered from frostbite when held in a punishment cell for refusing to work. When his term of exile ended, in 1942, he was drafted into the Red Army, and took part in the war, but he was arrested again in 1944, and on 10 February 1945 was sentenced to ten years in the Gulag for 'counter-revolutionary propaganda'. In the camps, he married a fellow prisoner, Valentina Savenkova, who was serving a ten-year sentence. Their daughter, Irina, was born in Siberia in March 1948, and from her teens was a lifelong campaigner for human rights until her death in May 1999. Yakir was released from the camps in 1953, after the death of Joseph Stalin, but remained in exile in Krasnoyarsk, where he worked in the timber industry. In all, he spent 17 years in prison, camps or exile, interrupted by his time in the army.

=== Civil rights campaigns ===
In 1956, after Nikita Khrushchev had denounced Stalin's crimes, Yakir and other surviving family members were allowed to return to Moscow. In 1961, after Khrushchev had referred to Iona Yakir's execution during a speech to the 22nd party congress, Pyotr became one of 'Khrushchev's zeks' (zek is Russian slang for a prisoner in the Gulag). He met the Soviet leader, and was allocated a good apartment in Moscow, and a post in the History Institute of the USSR Academy of Sciences. But after the fall of Khrushchev, he became disturbed by signs that the regime was reverting to practices associated with the Stalin years. He and his friend, Victor Krasin, an economist and former Gulag inmate, formed the Action Group for the Defence of Human Rights in the USSR. He was also involved in producing the Samizdat publication A Chronicle of Current Events, which was the main contemporary source of information about political repression in the USSR, and he signed protests against the arrests of dissidents such as Andrei Amalrik, Vladimir Bukovsky and many more. In March 1971, he addressed an Open Letter to the 24th Congress of the Communist Party of the Soviet Union warning against "a dangerous trend towards the restoration of Stalinist methods of government ... and in art literature, historical works and memoirs - towards the rehabilitation of Stalin himself, one of the greatest criminals of the 20th century." In October 1971, he was arrested on the morning of Khrushchev's funeral, to prevent him joining the mourners, but was released later in the day. He frequently passed information to foreign correspondents based in Moscow. Anticipating arrested, he told David Bonavia, of The Times, that any confession he made under arrest would not have come from the "real" Pyotr Yakir. In October 1971, he was arrested on the morning of Khrushchev's funeral, to prevent joining the mourners, but released later that day. His apartment was raided several times.

=== Repudiation of dissident activity ===
Yakir was arrested for the last time on 21 June 1972. While he was in prison, his memoir, A Childhood in Prison was published in English, in London. On 4 November, his daughter, Irina was allowed to visit him in Lefortovo Prison. He told her that her that A Chronicle of Current Events had a "tendentious character" and was "objectively harmful." As well as renouncing their own pasts, he and his friend Krasin, who was arrested in September 1972, gave the KGB a vast amount of information about other political dissidents. More than 200 people were interrogated about information given by the pair, including Irina Yakir, who refused to follow her father's example and continued to campaign for civil rights. After a week-long trial, in August–September 1973, during which Yakir begged the judges not to make him die in prison, he and Krasin were sentenced to three years in prison, followed by three years' exile. On 5 September, they gave a televised news conference, to which foreign correspondents were invited, in which both men confessed that their activity had aided the USSR's enemies abroad, and Yakir denounced reports of the Political abuse of psychiatry in the Soviet Union as 'libelous'. As a reward for co-operation, the two men's sentences were reduced to the time already spent in prison. Yakir was exiled to Ryazan. He was pardoned in September 1974, and lived in his daughter's flat for the rest of his life, but had to leave the room, or the flat, whenever she met fellow dissidents. He started drinking heavily, and died of a ruptured artery after an accident while he was out walking.
