= Victor Krasin =

Russian human rights activist (1929–2017)

Victor Aleksandrovich Krasin
- Виктор Александрович Красин
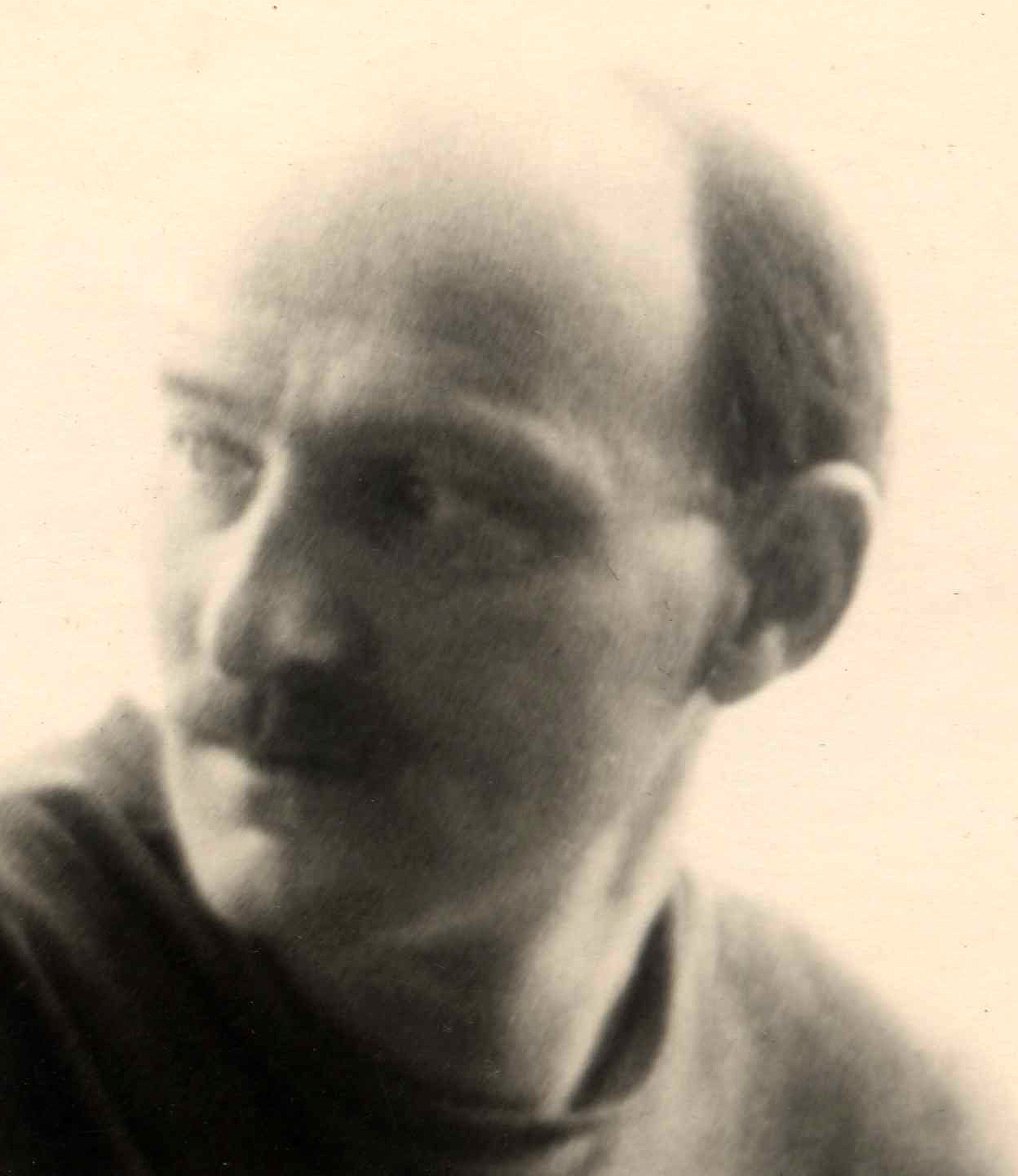
- Victor Krasin in 1968, when he was active in the human rights movement
- Born: 4 August 1929; Kyiv, Ukrainian SSR, Soviet Union
- Died: 3 September 2017 (aged 88); Nahariya, Israel
- Citizenship: Soviet Union (1929–1991) → Russian Federation (1991–present), United States
- Education: Moscow State University
- Occupation: economist
- Employer: Central Economic Mathematical Institute
- Known for: human rights activism with participation in Initiative Group for the Defense of Human Rights in the USSR
- Movement: dissident movement in the Soviet Union

Victor Aleksandrovich Krasin (also spelled Viktor Krasin, Russian: Ви́ктор Алекса́ндрович Кра́син, 4 August 1929 – 3 September 2017) was a Russian human rights activist, economist, a former Soviet dissident and a political prisoner. At the time of his death Krasin was a US citizen.

== Biography ==
In 1947 Krasin entered the Moscow University's Psychology Department of the Philosophical Faculty.

In January 1949, Krasin and some friends were arrested by the KGB and sentenced to eight years in labor camps for criticizing Marxism–Leninism. Krasin was sent to the Ozerlag labor camp along the Tayshet railway. In September 1949, Krasin escaped with four others from the Taishet transit camp. They disarmed two of the guards when working in the sand carrier in the forest. They were re-captured on the third day and sentenced to 10 years for counter-revolutionary sabotage. Krasin spent the first winter working in the logging camp.

In 1950 Krasin was transferred to the Kolyma region in the USSR Ear east, in the Berlag labor camp. Ozerlag and Berlag were special camps for political prisoners. The prisoners worked 10 hours a day, usually with one rest day in a month, and had the right to send only two letters per year. In the Magadan transit camp Krasin learned how to work on a lathe machine. He was transferred to the uranium mines and this skill saved his life. Many miners became deadly sick in one year because of silicosis, but Krasin was registered as a turner and worked the rest of his term in the mechanical shops. After Stalin's death, in October 1954, Krasin and the others who were arrested in 1949 were brought back to Moscow, released and rehabilitated.

In 1963 Krasin graduated from the Economic Faculty of Moscow State University. He worked as a truck and taxi driver. Krasin completed postgraduate studies in 1966 in the Department of Statistics. He was unable to defend his thesis because it did not correspond to Marxist standards. From 1966 to 1968 Krasin worked as a researcher at the Central Economics and Mathematics Institute (CEMI).

At this time Krasin started self-publishing: he took photographs and gave friends uncensored books to read. Krasin also began collecting information about human rights violations. He established relations with American correspondents Henry Kamm from New York Times, Frank Starr from Chicago Tribune and Tony Collins from Associated Press and passed them materials on human rights violations in the USSR which were then published in the US press. In May 1969 Pyotr Yakir and Krasin organized the Initiative Group for Defence of Human Rights in the USSR – the first legal organization to oppose political repression in the USSR.

In the autumn of 1968 Krasin was fired from CEMI, because he refused to stop his human rights activities. He did not work for a year but meanwhile began contributing to A Chronicle of Current Events. In 1969, he signed An Appeal to The UN Committee for Human Rights. Then in 1969, almost exactly one year later, he was arrested then sentenced to five years of internal exile on a charge of parasitism, under the "anti-parasite law" initiated by Nikita Khrushchev. Krasin was serving his term in the Krasnoyarsk area. While he was in exile he was informed that in June 1971 his friend and participating rights activist Nadezhda Pavlovna Yemel'kin was arrested for demonstrating alone on Pushkin Square holding up a banner "Freedom to Political Prisoners in the USSR." After the RSFSR Supreme Court overturned Krasin's verdict in autumn 1971 he went to the town of Yeniseisk where she was in exile and married her. This was his second marriage. In the first marriage, he fathered three sons who emigrated with their mother to Israel in 1972.

In September 1972 he was again arrested by the KGB on the charge of anti-soviet propaganda (Article 70). He was subjected to intense KGB interrogation and agreed to cooperate. Based on his testimony, many Soviet dissidents were convicted. Then he was placed on trial with Yakir. They were initially sentenced to three years of exile, but then freed. Krasin subsequently wrote a book detailing the interrogation and the trial.

On September 12, 1973, two weeks after Krasin's trial, the United States Senate adopted a resolution which was an appeal to President Richard Nixon to demand that the Soviet government stop repression of the participants of the human rights movement in the USSR. It was stated in this resolution that Andrei Sakharov, Alexander Solzhenitsyn, Pyotr Yakir and Victor Krasin had "demonstrated enormous courage and intellectual honesty in advocating and defending the importance of fundamental civil and political liberty." On September 18, 1973, a similar resolution was adopted by the United States House of Representatives, and stated that the public humiliation of Yakir and Krasin was an outrage that "served to illuminate the plight of hundreds of thousands of Soviet citizens."

In February 1975, Krasin and his wife emigrated to the United States. They became US citizens in 1981. Krasin was interviewed by the New York Times Magazine and a cover article was published called "How I Was Broken by the K.G.B." in the magazine on 18 March 1984. From 1984 to 1991, he worked as a correspondent for Radio Liberty. In the summer of 1991 Krasin and his wife returned to Moscow. In 2003 they returned to the United States. He since contributed articles to The Daily Journal (Russian: Ежедневный журнал).

Victor Krasin died on September 3, 2017, of unknown causes. He was 88.
