= Plyushch =

Plyushch is a surname. Notable people with the surname include:

- Leonid Plyushch (1938–2015), Ukrainian mathematician
- Ivan Plyushch (1941–2014), Ukrainian politician
