= Chronicle of Current Events =

1968–1982 periodical in the Soviet Union

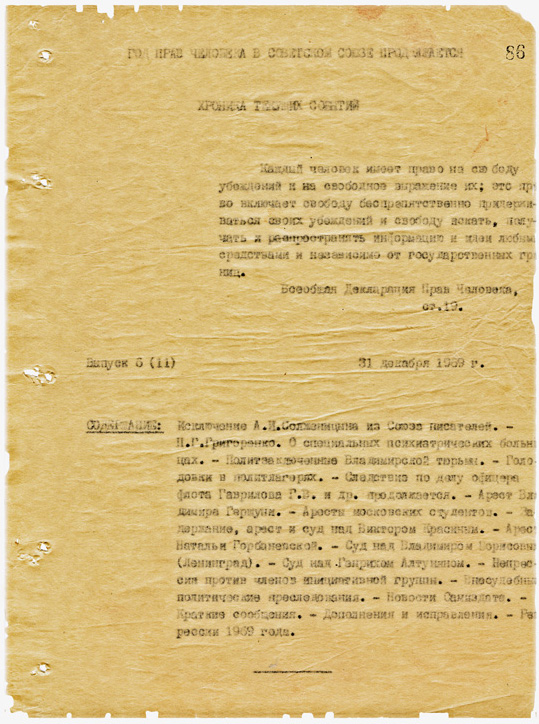
- A Chronicle of Current Events No 11, 31 December 1968 (front cover)
- Editor: List of editors: Natalya Gorbanevskaya; Galina Gabai; Yelena Smorgunova; Yuli Kim; Anatoly Yakobson; Tatyana Khodorovich; Sergei Kovalev (Kovalyov); Tatyana Velikanova; Alexander Lavut; Yuri Shikhanovich; and others
- Categories: human rights movement in the Soviet Union, political repression in the Soviet Union, political abuse of psychiatry in the Soviet Union, samizdat
- Frequency: Bimonthly / quarterly
- Publisher: Soviet human rights movement
- Total circulation: 6 x 6 x 6 ?
- Founded: 1968
- Final issue: August 1983 (June 1982)
- Country: Soviet Union
- Based in: Moscow
- Language: Russian, English (translated since 1971)
- Website: A Chronicle of Current Events English translation. Khronika tekushchikh sobytii Russian original.

A Chronicle of Current Events (Russian: Хро́ника теку́щих собы́тий, romanized: Khronika tekushchikh sobytiy) was one of the longest running samizdat periodicals of the post-Stalinist Soviet Union. This unofficial newsletter reported violations of civil rights and judicial procedure by the Soviet government and responses to those violations by citizens across the Soviet Union. Appearing first in April 1968, it soon became the main voice of the Soviet human rights movement, inside the country and abroad.

During the 15 years of its existence the Chronicle covered 424 political trials, in which 753 people were convicted. Not one of the accused was acquitted. In addition, 164 people were declared insane and sent for indefinite periods of compulsory treatment in psychiatric hospitals. In 1973 the novelist and literary critic Lydia Chukovskaya wrote:

... the persecution of samizdat, of A Chronicle of Current Events, of Sakharov, Solzhenitsyn, and hundreds of others cannot be called ideological struggle. It is an attempt once again to silence human voices through the use of prisons and camps.

Despite constant harassment by the Soviet authorities, more than sixty issues of the Chronicle were compiled and published (circulated) between April 1968 and August 1983. One issue (No 59, November 1980) was confiscated by the KGB. The last issue to appear (No 64, June 1982) was not put into circulation until the very end of August the following year. (Note: CCE 64, Contents, see note at foot of the page from "Vesti iz SSSR", 31 August 1983, item 16.31.) Material was gathered and checked up to 31 December 1982 but issue No. 65 never went into circulation.

== Origins – the background to CCE No. 1 ==
By the mid-1960s critically minded adults and youngsters in Moscow (later they would be known as dissidents) were confronted by a growing range of information about ongoing political repressions in the Soviet Union. For example, in letters home from the prison camps the writers Yuli Daniel and Andrey Sinyavsky, sentenced and imprisoned in 1966, told of far greater numbers of political prisoners than they and others had previously believed to exist.

For the circle of future editors, this picture was amplified by Anatoly Marchenko's My Testimony, a seminal text which began circulating in samizdat in December 1967. It provided a detailed account of his time in labor camps and Soviet prisons (1960–1965), as well as describing the conditions there. Through other contacts and friends, sometimes during prison or camp visits, older and younger generations in Moscow began to learn of the repressive measures being used in Ukraine and the Russian provinces.

This growth in the unofficial, alternative and uncensored circulation of information led a group including poet and translator Natalya Gorbanevskaya, writer Ilya Gabay and physicist Pavel Litvinov to consider organising a regular information bulletin. Rather than follow previous samizdat genres, the literary almanac (e.g. Phoenix, Syntaxis) or collections documenting a single trial (e.g. The White Book), the new periodical would process the steady flow of information by circulating regular reports and updates about searches, arrests, trials, conditions in prisons and camps and extrajudicial measures against protest and dissent—at least for the duration of 1968. That year marked the 20th anniversary of the UN Declaration of Human Rights and Nos. 1–5 are titled Human Rights Year in the Soviet Union: until 1969 A Chronicle of Current Events was the sub-title of the periodical.

A prototype already existed in bulletins by repressed groups that had recently begun publication in samizdat, such as a Baptist periodical, published since 1965. An example for the Chronicle's first editorial group was the informational bulletin of the Crimean Tatars, established in 1964. Unlike these single-issue periodicals, which mainly circulated among their respective groups, the editors and contributors to the new publication aimed to cover a broader spectrum of political repression and appeal to a wider audience.

A turning point for the young dissident movement came in 1967 when Yuri Galanskov, Alexander Dobrovolsky and Vera Lashkova were arrested in Moscow for producing literary samizdat magazines. At the same moment Alexander Ginzburg was detained for collaborating with Galanskov on the White Book, a volume of documents about the trial of writers Andrei Sinyavsky and Yuli Daniel. The Galanskov-Ginzburg trial, delayed until January 1968, and the public protests before and after the accused were convicted, formed the main subject of the first issue of the Chronicle, circulated in Moscow in June 1968. Issue No. 1 detailed the repressive measures taken by the authorities against individuals who signed the numerous petitions and collective letters concerning the trial. (Note: CCE 1, 30 April 1968 — 1.1 "The Trial", 1.2 "Protests about the Trial", and 1.3 "Repressive Measures in Response to the Protests")

== Publication process and legality ==
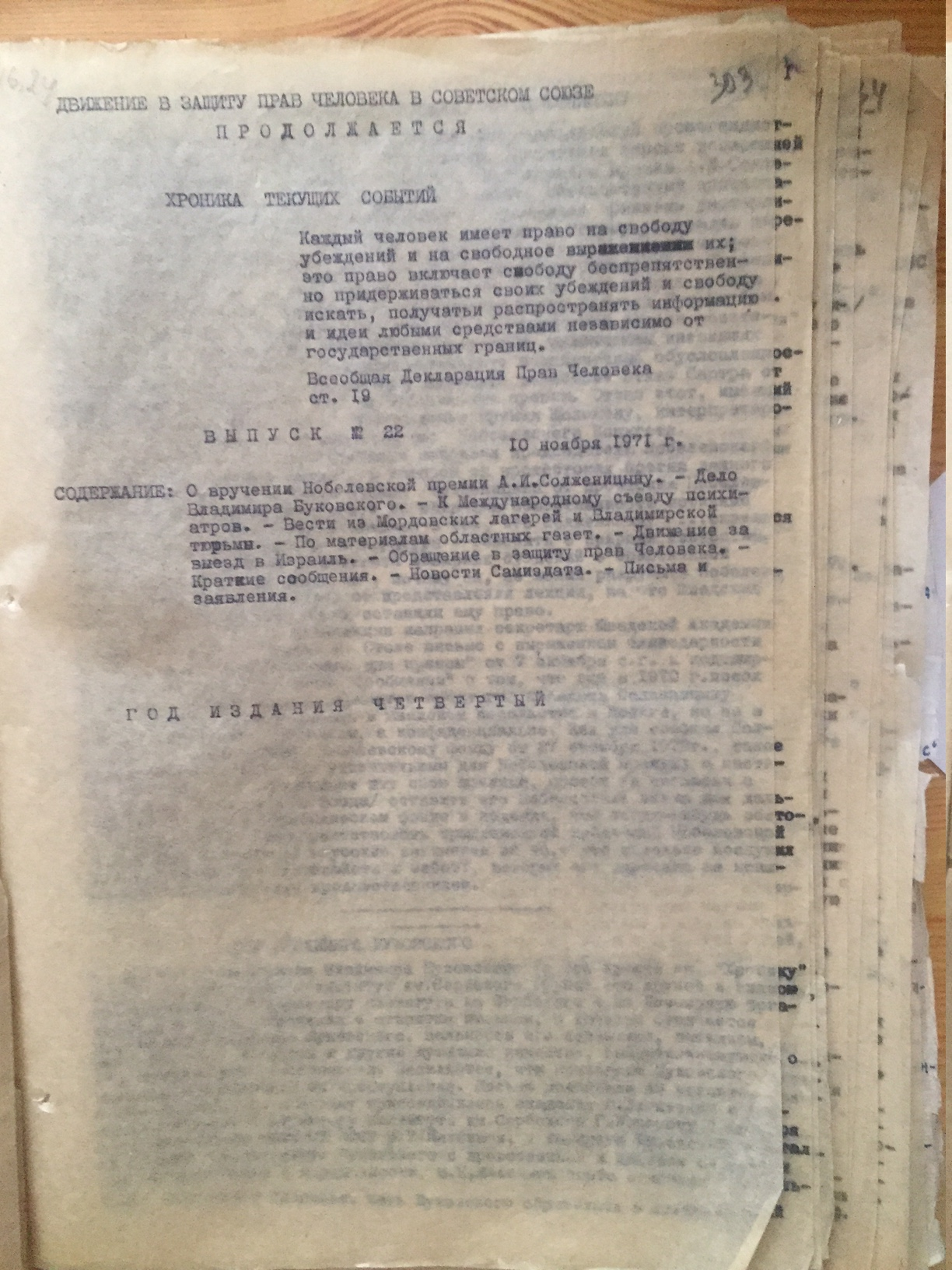
Issue 22, dated 10 November 1971

The Chronicle was compiled in Moscow by anonymous editors, drawing on a network of informants throughout the Soviet Union. Known for its dry, concise style, it documented the extrajudicial harassment and persecution, the arrests and trials of those who opposed the regime for its denial of their rights; it carried further reports about their subsequent treatment in prisons, labor camps, and mental asylums.

The periodical adopted standard samizdat techniques, whereby typewritten texts were retyped by recipients and passed along in chain-letter fashion. An initial "circulation run" of 10 to 12 copies (also known as nulevaya zakladka, roughly, "zero generation manuscript") thus spread throughout the country in hundreds of typewritten copies.

The authors encouraged readers to utilize the same distribution channels in order to send feedback and local information: "Simply tell it to the person from whom you received the Chronicle, and he will tell the person from whom he received the Chronicle, and so on." This advice came with a warning: "But do not try to trace back the whole chain of communication yourself, or else you will be taken for a police informer."

The date of each issue reflected the latest information it included, not the moment when it was first circulated or "published" in Moscow. As the size of the successive issues grew, and disruption by the Soviet authorities of its wider circulation increased, the gap grew between these two dates from a few months to many. Issue 63, for instance, contained 230 typescript pages and while it bore the date 31 December 1981, it did not appear in Moscow until March 1983.

=== Legality and the Constitution ===
According to the 1936 Soviet Constitution then in force, the Chronicle was not an illegal publication, or so the editors maintained:

The Chronicle is in no sense an illegal publication, and the difficult conditions in which it is produced are created by the peculiar notions about law and freedom of information which, in the course of long years, have become established in certain Soviet organizations. For this reason the Chronicle cannot, like any other journal, give its postal address on the last page.

The authorities thought otherwise, as is reflected in the list of people harassed, detained and imprisoned for their part in the periodical's production and circulation (see Section The Editors). Some were given camp sentences—Sergei Kovalev, Alexander Lavut, Tatyana Velikanova and Yury Shikhanovich; some were sent to psychiatric hospitals—Natalya Gorbanevskaya. Others were persuaded to leave the country—Anatoly Yakobson, Tatyana Khodorovich.

== Publication history ==
=== Beginnings: issues 1–27 (1968–72) ===
In honor of the Universal Declaration of Human Rights, the United Nations declared 1968 as the "International Year for Human Rights". In April Natalya Gorbanevskaya compiled the first issue of the Chronicle of Current Events. Its cover (dated 30 April 1968) carried the title: "The International Year for Human Rights in the Soviet Union" and, like every subsequent issue of the Chronicle, quoted the text of Article 19 of the 1948 Universal Declaration of Human Rights:

Everyone has the right to freedom of opinion and expression; this right includes freedom to hold opinions without interference and to seek, receive and impart information and ideas through any media and regardless of frontiers.

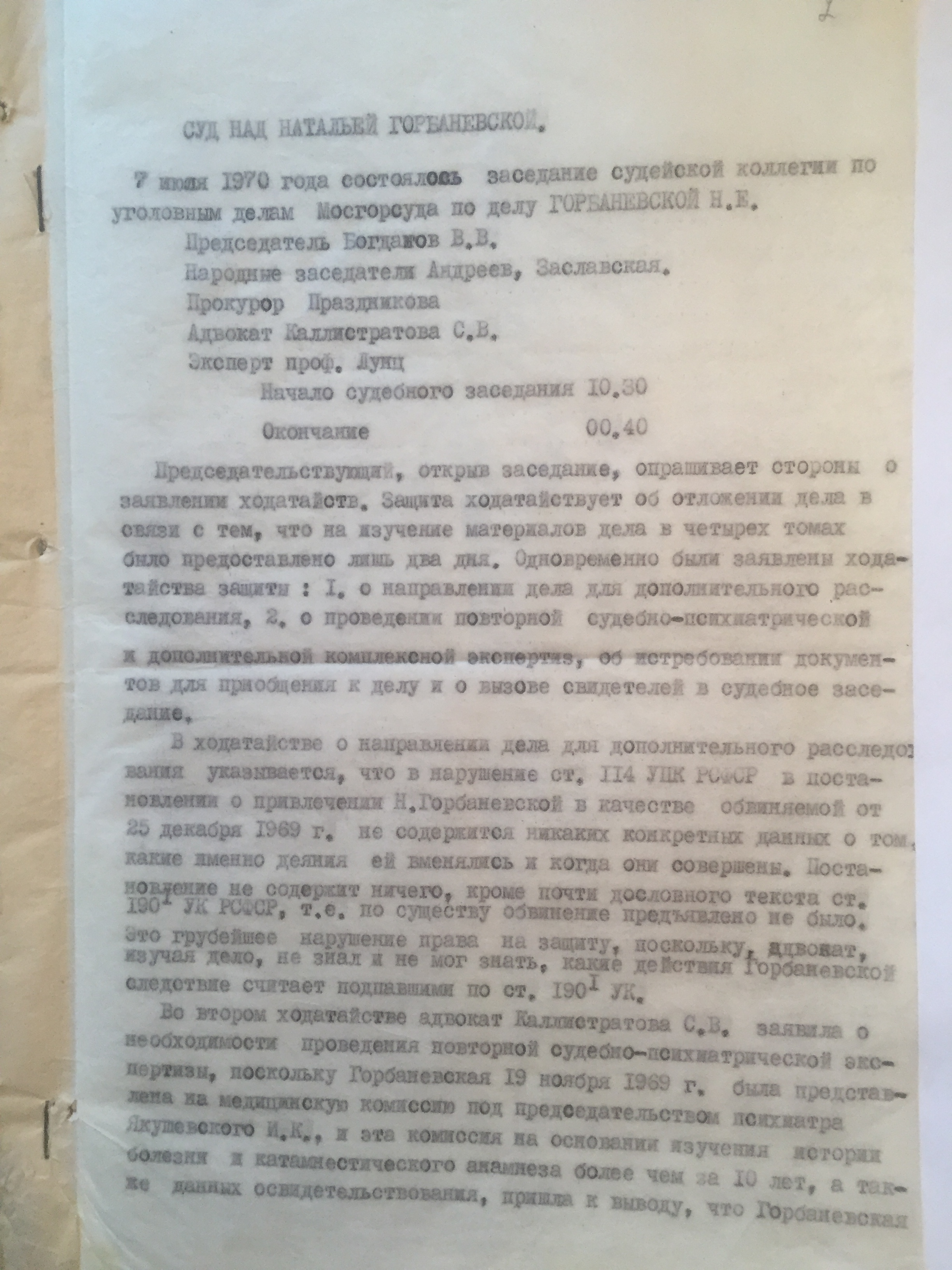
Report on the trial of Natalya Gorbanevskaya, issue 15 (31 August 1970)

The issue reported on the trial of the Social Christian Union in Leningrad and already carried information from the camps. Its main focus, however, was the trial of Galanskov and Ginzburg in Moscow.

As the first compiler of the Chronicle and its typist, Gorbanevskaya produced the "zero-generation" copy based on information from her friends in Moscow, using a typewriter purchased on the semi-legal grey market. She made six copies which were then secretly distributed to friends, who made further carbon copies on their own typewriters, passing them on, in turn, to friends and trusted acquaintances.

Gorbanevskaya was arrested on 24 December 1969, while compiling issue 11. She managed to hide the source papers, which had handwriting which could identify other authors, in her desk, and additional information was hidden in her coat. The KGB missed both of these hiding places. Issue 11 was released on schedule and included a report on Gorbanevskaya's arrest. She was released, but again arrested in 1970 and put on trial. (Note: CCE 15, 31 August 1970 — 15.1 "The trial of Natalya Gorbanevskaya".) Diagnosed with schizophrenia, Gorbanevskaya was held in a Soviet psychiatric prison until February 1972. Eventually she was allowed to return to Moscow and in 1975 she emigrated to France.

Following Gorbanevskaya's arrest, her work was taken over by literary critic Anatoly Yakobson. He collated the material for issues 11–27 of the Chronicle until the end of 1972, after which he emigrated from the USSR.

=== Disruption: Case 24 (1972–73) ===
By 1972, the Chronicle was being run by biologist Sergei Kovalev, mathematician Tatyana Velikanova and linguist Tatyana Khodorovich. Kovalev acted as chief editor, while Velikanova was responsible for collating material and organizing apartments for meetings, with Khodorovich serving as a major conduit for information.

In June 1972, the KGB arrested Pyotr Yakir, followed by Victor Krasin in September. Numerous witnesses were summoned and cross-examined over the following months (Bukovsky, for example, was brought from Vladimir Prison) as part of Case No. 24. (Note: CCE 28, 31 December 1972 — 28.3 "A Chronicle of Case No. 24"; CCE 29, 30 June 1973 — 29.8 "A Chronicle of Case No 24 (II)"; (3) CCE 30, 31 December 1973 — 30.1 "The Trial of P. Yakir and V. Krasin. (Statement by the Action Group on Human Rights).") Under pressure from KGB General Yaroslav Karpov, Yakir and Krasin agreed to appear on Soviet television, recant their past activities, and urge their fellow activists to stop the publication of the Chronicle. They also passed on the KGB threat that, for every issue published after the broadcast, there would be an arrest.

The editors of the Chronicle suspended publication after Issue 27 (15 October 1972). This did not prevent the arrest in January 1973 of Irina Belogorodskaya, who occasionally assisted in typing up manuscripts for the journal. As a reaction to the new situation, the Chronicle's editors prefaced Issue 28 (31 December 1972) with a declaration stating that they had decided to resume publication because they found the KGB ultimatum to be "incompatible" with "justice, morality and human dignity". This declaration would not be made public for another 16 months, however.

After some discussion those closely involved in the production of the journal decided to change the periodical's established policy of anonymity, to the extent of naming themselves as distributors: they did not then or subsequently admit to being authors and editors of the Chronicle.

To undermine the blackmailing tactics of the KGB they agreed to circulate a declaration acknowledging their personal responsibility for the periodical's circulation when they issued the delayed issues of the Chronicle: No. 28 (31 December 1972), No. 29 (31 July 1973), and No. 30 (31 December 1973). Unlike other groups, for example, the dissident Action Group on Human Rights in the USSR, previous editors of the Chronicle had never openly linked their names to the samizdat text. In taking this step, Kovalyov, Velikanova and Khodorovich hoped to make it more difficult for the authorities to implicate others.

On 7 May 1974, they invited foreign correspondents to a press conference at which issue Nos. 28, 29 and 30 were openly distributed. At the same event Kovalyov, Velikanova and Khodorovich issued a press release. It was signed by all three of them and consisted of a few short sentences:

Since we do not consider, despite the repeated assertions of the KGB and the USSR court instances, that A Chronicle of Current Events is an illegal or libelous publication, we regard it as our duty to facilitate as wide a circulation for it as possible. We believe it is essential that truthful information about violations of basic human rights in the Soviet Union should be available to all who are interested in it.

=== Publication resumes: issues 28–65 (1974–82) ===
After the arrests and prosecutions of "Case No. 24", the Chronicle of Current Events continued to appear several times a year, though less frequently than before.

The three "distributors" who gave up their anonymity to hold the 7 May 1974 press conference and announce the resumption of the Chronicle's publication were all punished for their audacity. Sergei Kovalev was arrested in December that year. In 1975 he was put on trial and sentenced to seven years of labor camps and three years of internal exile for "anti-Soviet agitation and propaganda". Tatyana Khodorovich was forced into emigration. In 1979 Tatyana Velikanova was finally arrested and in 1980 she was prosecuted and sentenced to five years in the camps and five years' internal exile. (Note: CCE 56, 30 April 1980 — 56.7 "The case of Tatyana Velikanova", and CCE 58, October 1980 — 58.1 "The trial of Tatyana Velikanova".)

In February 1981, issue No. 59 was confiscated in the last stages of preparation during a KGB search of the apartment of Leonid Vul, one of the Chronicle's contributing editors. As the issues grew larger, and pressure from the authorities increased, the first appearance of the Chronicle in Moscow might come months after its formal date, e.g. Issue 63 (31 December 1981) was 230 pages long and appeared in the Soviet capital in March 1983. The final issue of the Chronicle was dated 31 December 1982, but it was never circulated in the USSR or translated abroad. All attempt at continuing publication ceased after the arrest of Yury Shikhanovich on 17 November 1983. As compiling editor he had played an essential role in preparing six of the last issues of the Chronicle.

== The editors of the Chronicle ==
The circumstances of the Chronicle's existence meant there could be no editorial board performing the usual functions of an officially constituted magazine. It was thus closer to "a system devoid of directives and commands, as well editorial assignments".

A list of those who compiled the successive issues of A Chronicle of Current Events has been put together and made public by historians from Memorial. The list attempts to include both the editors responsible for the final version of each issue (the chief editors for want of a better term), as well as editors who oversaw particular sections, verified the information they contained, or those who typed the zero-generation editions (listed as contributing editors).

The lists provided below do not include all who were directly involved. Before Alexander Podrabinek became a subject of the Chronicle's reports in the late 1970s, for instance, when he was put on trial and sent into exile, he was a contributing editor for two years, responsible for gathering and sifting reports about those imprisoned in psychiatric hospitals. (Note: CCE, 25 May 1977 - 45.13 "In the Psychiatric Hospitals".) The identity of some editors remains unknown. Also not included in either list are the many people who contributed information and reports to the Chronicle, or were sentenced for distributing samizdat including the Chronicle.

Chief editors

Issue	Editor	Comments (Note: Sentences include only those specifically relating to charges concerning the Chronicle.)
1–10 (April 1968 to Oct. 1969)	Natalya Gorbanevskaya	3 years' incarceration in a psychiatric institution (1970–72); emigrated to France in 1975
11 (Dec. 1969)	Galina Gabai	Sacked from her post at school for deaf and hard of hearing (Note: CCE. 31 August 1969 - 9.8 Extra-judicial political persecution.)
12 (Feb. 1970)	Yelena Smorgunova	
12 (Feb. 1970)	Yuli Kim	
11–27 (Dec. 1969 to Oct. 1972)	Anatoly Yakobson	Emigrated to Israel in 1973 (Note: CCE 31 December 1973 - 30.14, item 6 "News in Brief".)
28–30 (May 1974)	Tatyana Khodorovich	Emigrated to France in 1977
28–30; 32–33 (May 1974; Jul. 1974 to Dec. 1974)	Sergei Kovalev	7 years in labor camps, 3 years' internal exile (1975–85)
28–30; 32–53 (May 1974; Jul. 1974 to Aug. 1979)	Tatyana Velikanova	4 years in labor camps, 5 years' internal exile (1980–88)
31; 54–55 (May 1974; Nov-Dec. 1979)	Alexander Lavut	3 years in labor camps, 3 years' internal exile (1980–86)
56–58; 60–64 (Note: Issues 59 and 65 of the Chronicle were confiscated during searches and were not put into wider circulation.) (Apr-Nov. 1980; Dec. 1980 to June 1982)	Yury Shikhanovich	5 years in labor camps, 5 years' internal exile (1983–87)

Contributing editors

- Lyudmila Alekseeva
- Svetlana Feliksovna ARTSIMOVICH
- Vyacheslav Ivanovich BAKHMIN – 10 months' detention
- Irina Mikhaylovna BELOGORODSKAYA – 10 months' detention
- Leonid Iosifovich BLEKHER
- Larisa Bogoraz
- Anna Ivanovna BRYKSINA (née Kaleda)
- Valeriy Chalidze
- Aleksandr Yul'evich DANIEL
- Nadezhda Pavlovna Emel'kina (YEMELKINA) – 5 years' internal exile
- Georgiy Isaakovich EFREMOV (Yuriy Zbarskiy)
- Efim Maksimovich Epshteyn (Yefim EPSTEIN)
- Ilya Gabay – 3 years in labor camps
- Yuri Gastev
- Mark Gdal'evich GELSHTEYN
- Yuriy Yakovlevich GERCHUK
- Aleksandr Borisovich GRIBANOV
- Vyacheslav Vladimirovich IGRUNOV – 2 years' detention and psychiatric imprisonment
- Sergey Glebovich KALEDA
- Lyudmila Vladimirovna KARDASEVICH
- Ivan Sergeevich KOVALYOV – 5 years in labor camps, 5 years' internal exile
- Elena Alekseevna KOSTYORINA (Kosterina)
- Natal'ya Andreevna KRAVCHENKO
- Viktor Krasin – 1 year of labor camps, 3 years' internal exile
- Mal'va Noyevna LANDA – 5 years' internal exile
- Vera Iosifovna Lashkova
- Nina Petrovna Lisovskaya
- Pavel Litvinov
- Kronid Lyubarsky – 5 years in labor camps
- Irina Rodionovna Maksimova
- Margarita Borisovna Nabokova
- Tat'yana Semenovna Osipova – 5 years in labor camps, 5 years' internal exile
- Lyudmila Vladimirovna Polikovskaya
- Arkadiy Abramovich Polishchuk
- Ivan Vladimirovich Rudakov
- Elena Sergeevna Semeka
- Aleksey Olegovich Smirnov – 6 years in labor camps, 4 years' internal exile
- Boris Isaevich Smushkevich
- Gabriel' Gavrilovich Superfin – 5 years in labor camps, 2 years' internal exile
- Lev Isaevich Tanengol'ts
- Tserina L'vovna Tanengol'ts
- Yulius Zinov'evich Telesin
- Vladimir Solomonovich Tol'ts
- Andrey Kimovich Tsaturyan
- Leonid Davidovich Vul'
- Irina Petrovna Yakir
- Petr Ionovich Yakir – 1 year in labor camps, 3 years' internal exile (Note: CCE 30, 31 December 1973 — 30.1 "The Trial of Yakir and Krasin".)
- Efrem Vladimirovich Yankelevich
- Vera Khasanovna Zelendinova

== Content, structure and style ==
1. Suspension of the Case Against Mikhail Naritsa

2. RELIGION IN THE USSR

– A Lecture by Furin

– A Letter from Lev Regelson and Gleb Yakunin

– A new Way of Fighting against Religion

– Evangelical Christians

– Pentecostals

3. Events in Lithuania

4. Andrei Tverdokhlebov in Exile

5. Arrests, Searches and Interrogations

6. IN THE PRISONS AND CAMPS

– Vladimir Prison

– The Mordovian Camps

– The Perm Camps

– Letters and statements by political prisoners

– In Defence of Political Prisoners

– Releases

7. IN THE PSYCHIATRIC HOSPITALS

– Chernyakhovsk Special Psychiatric Hospital

– Sychyovka Special Psychiatric Hospital

– Dnepropetrovsk Special Psychiatric Hospital

– Kazan Special Psychiatric Hospital

8. The Helsinki Monitoring Group

9. PERSECUTION OF THE CRIMEAN TATARS

– Evictions

– No Residence Permit – no work

– Trials

10. The Emigration Movement of the Germans

11. The Struggle of the Meskhetians to Return to Georgia

12. In Pushkin House

13. Unofficial Entertainment

14. News in Brief

15. Corrections and additions

— Table of Contents of the Chronicle of Current Events No 41, 3 August 1976

The Chronicle strove for maximum precision and completeness of information, and was marked by an objective and restrained style. Issue 5 expressed this concern:

The Chronicle makes every effort to achieve a calm, restrained tone. Unfortunately, the materials with which the Chronicle is dealing evoke emotional reactions, and these automatically affect the tone of the text. The Chronicle does, and will do, its utmost to ensure that its strictly factual style is maintained to the greatest degree possible, but it cannot guarantee complete success. The Chronicle tries to refrain from making value judgments—either by not making them at all, or by referring to judgments made in samizdat documents.

Each issue of the Chronicle was broadly divided in two.

The first part contained a detailed presentation of what, in the compiler's opinion, were the most important events since the previous issue. The second part consisted of a number of regular headings: "Arrests, Searches, Interrogations", "Extra-Judicial Persecution", "In Prisons and camps", "Samizdat update", "News in brief", "Corrections and additions".

Over time, the number of headings was expanded as new issues came to the attention of the authors. The heading "Persecution of believers" soon appeared, as did "Persecution of Crimean Tatars" and "Repressive measures in Ukraine". In early 1972, the category "Persecution of believers in Lithuania" was added, being modified and expanded in the middle of the same year into a new, and more general title "Events in Lithuania". These all became a regular feature, appearing whenever there was news or an update to report.

In later issues, the Chronicle also included summaries of other samizdat bulletins, such as the Information Bulletins of the dissident civic group Working Commission to Investigate the Use of Psychiatry for Political Purposes, and the documents of the Moscow Helsinki Group.

== Impact in the Soviet Union ==
During the time of the publication of the Chronicle of Current Events (1968–1982), its concept and approach was taken up by dissidents in other parts of the USSR. In the early 1970s, the example of the Chronicle was followed in Ukraine (Ukrainsky visnyk, Ukraine Herald, 1970–1975) and Lithuania (Chronicle of the Catholic Church in Lithuania, 1972–1989).

"I consider the Chronicle's thirteen years of publication a genuine miracle, and I consider it as well an expression of the spirit and moral strength of the human rights movement in the USSR. The authorities' hatred of the Chronicle, manifested in innumerable acts of persecution, only confirms that evaluation." (Andrei Sakharov, 1981)

A contemporary samizdat publication similarly concerned with protest and dissent, Bulletin V (Бюллетень В) began to appear in the later 1970s, at first with a restricted list of recipients. It was issued for four years (1980–1983) and placed greater emphasis on speed of publication, attempting to appear once a fortnight, if not once every week, acting primarily as a source of information for others.

Five years after the demise of A Chronicle of Current Events the tradition of underground human-rights periodicals was revived in the second year of Gorbachev's "glasnost" and perestroika. On return in 1987 from exile in the Soviet Far East Alexander Podrabinek started the weekly Express-Chronicle newspaper; at the same time Sergei Grigoryants founded the Glasnost' periodical and became its chief editor. Neither of these publications sought or received official permission for their activities.

== Émigré publications with links to the Chronicle ==
=== A Chronicle of Human Rights in the USSR (New York, 1973–1982) ===
During the break forced on the Moscow editors during 1972 and 1973 by "Case 24", an offshoot of the Chronicle of Current Events began publication in New York. Valery Chalidze was a physicist, the founder and chief editor in Moscow of the Social Issues periodical, and a prominent Soviet dissident. Chalidze was deprived of his Soviet citizenship in 1972 during a government-approved lecture tour in the USA. In spring 1973 Chalidze, with the financial backing of Edward Kline, an American businessman with an interest in human rights, began publishing A Chronicle of Human Rights in the USSR.

The editorial board consisted of Valery Chalidze, Edward Kline and Pavel Litvinov, with Peter Reddaway as the London correspondent. Although the contents of The Chronicle of Human Rights in the USSR were analogous to those of the Chronicle of Current Events, and adopted its style and tone, they were never a straight reprint or translation. The New York periodical contained numerous thematic articles that never appeared in the Moscow Chronicle of Current Events. These were contributed by Chalidze and by others.

=== USSR News Update: Human Rights (Munich, 1978–1991) ===
The USSR News Update: Human Rights ("Вести из СССР – права человека") issued fortnightly in Munich (in Russian), developed out of the samizdat tradition represented by the Chronicle but adopted a different model. It was there, moreover, to continue recording human rights violations after the Chronicle was forced to cease activities in 1983.

In the editor's address to readers of the new publication in November 1978, the aims of the new periodical were clearly stated: 1. to provide prompt information, once every fortnight, about individuals at risk; 2. to no longer carry the interesting, but non-essential reports on new samizdat publications that had become a regular feature of the Chronicle; and 3. to maintain a frequently updated list of political prisoners.

USSR News Brief was founded, compiled and edited by Kronid Lyubarsky (1934–1996). An astrophysicist by profession, he imposed a meticulous system for recording and locating information within each succeeding issue of the new periodical. A former contributing editor of the Chronicle, Lyubarsky was also (together with Alexei Murzhenko) behind the introduction of the annual Day of the Political Prisoner in the USSR (30 October) when he found himself in the camps.

The last issue of USSR News Brief appeared in December 1991. In the early 1990s Lyubarsky returned to live and work in Russia.

== Translations of the Chronicle ==
All but two of the 65 issues of the Chronicle were translated into English:

Issues	Published in	Translator(s)	Notes
1–11	Uncensored Russia (1972)	Peter Reddaway	Almost the entire contents were translated and included in the book, but the individual reports were reallocated to thematic chapters.
12–15	–	Peter Reddaway	Unpublished, once available on the A Chronicle of Current Events website.
16–64	Amnesty International books (1971–1984), at first consisted of individual issues (17–27), later combining several issues at a time, e.g. Issues 46–48.	Zbyněk Zeman and many other volunteer translators.	Published at the time and in sequence, apart from three issues from 1976 to 1977 that only appeared in English translation in January 1979. (Note: A Chronicle of Current Events, issues 43-45, 31 December 1976, 12 March 1977, and 25 May 1977.) Issue 59 (15 November 1980) was confiscated on 20 February 1981 by the KGB in the final stages of preparation. Recently, the edited text has been recovered from the KGB files on Yury Shikhanovich.
65	–	–	Not published at the time or translated. Only the account of Gleb Pavlovsky's trial in August 1982 has so far appeared in English. (Note: "The trial of Gleb Pavlovsky", A Chronicle of Current Events, 65.1 (31 December 1982).)

A dedicated website, bringing all these translations together for the first time, was launched in the autumn of 2015.

=== Uncensored Russia (Peter Reddaway) ===
Nos. 1–11, covering 1968 and 1969, formed The Annotated Text of the Unofficial Moscow Journal, "A Chronicle of Current Events", in a book titled Uncensored Russia. This 1972 volume was produced by British academic Peter Reddaway who edited and translated the texts, apportioning the items to thematic sections in his book (e.g. Chapter 12, "The Crimean Tatars") rather than preserving the sequence and structure of the original issues. The book was provided with extensive annotations.

Reddaway subsequently translated and circulated issues 12 to 15 but they were never published until the creation of the Chronicle website in 2015.

=== A Chronicle of Current Events (Amnesty International) ===
From 1971 onwards Amnesty International periodically released booklets containing English translations of the Chronicle. The series began in 1971 with No. 16 (31 October 1970, Moscow) and ended in 1984 with No. 64 (30 June 1982, Moscow). The erratic and uncertain transfer of the texts to the West, and the time needed for translation into English, meant there was always a lag of months between the appearance of the latest issue in the USSR and its publication in English. The printed volumes might comprise one or more of the successive numbers. For reasons described above (see Section "Case 24") translations of Nos. 28–30, dated 1972 and 1973, appeared in a single volume much later than their nominal dates in Russian.

The production of these translations was organised by Zbyněk Zeman, a British historian of Czech origin, and over a period of almost ten years covered the issues from No. 17 (Moscow, 31 December 1970) to No. 58 (Moscow, 31 October 1980). One who restored the prompt translation and publication of the Chronicle in English after a halt at the height of détente in 1977 was Marjorie Farquharson, Amnesty's researcher on the USSR from 1978 to 1991. The issues were now translated and published within months, or at most a year later, and in the original sequence; three important "missed" issues from 1976 to 1977 appeared in English translation in January 1979. Amnesty published the translation of No. 64 (30 June 1982), the last circulated issue of the Chronicle, on the eve of perestroika in 1984.

== Post-Soviet Russia ==
The example and standards of the dissident Chronicle of Current Events continue to influence activists in post-Soviet Russia.

The Chronicle is cited as an inspiration by the founders of OVD-Info, which came into existence as a response to the "mass arrests of protesters in December 2011". OVD-Info, a human rights media project associated with the Memorial NGO, is concerned with "monitoring State violence". Today it gathers and distributes information about violations of human rights and freedom of expression in Russia using the same basic concepts and categories (political prisoners, extrajudicial harassment, police violence, freedom of assembly and protest) as were developed by the original samizdat journal to classify and analyse reports it received from all over the country.

A Russian website entitled A New Chronicle of Current Events appeared on the Internet in 2015. One of its founders, former Soviet dissident Victor Davydoff, in an interview with the "Voice of America" radio station, referred to the past experience of dissidents in the USSR. Any attempts at change within the system were immediately suppressed in Russia. When dissidents appealed to international human rights organizations and foreign governments, however, there was a result. The same approach, he suggested, should be used now. Mass manipulation through the media meant that many people in Russia did not understand what was happening, either in their own country or abroad. The New Chronicle website published a list of 217 political prisoners in Russia as of August 2015: opposition politicians, environmental activists, human rights activists, bloggers and religious believers.

After the full-scale Russo-Ukrainian War began in 2022, OVD-Info continued to gather and circulate information about abuses of human rights in contemporary Russia.

== Legacy ==
Today, the Chronicle offers a unique historical overview of the nature and extent of political repression in the Soviet Union. No other samizdat publication covered the entire country for so long, with the Chronicle recording every aspect of human rights violation that was committed by the post-Stalin Soviet authorities at both the national and local levels of the Soviet Union.

The periodical modelled itself on earlier more narrowly focused underground publications and in the early 1970s its example was followed in Ukraine (Ukrainsky visnyk, Ukraine Herald, 1970–1975) and Lithuania (Chronicle of the Catholic Church in Lithuania, 1972–1989). The Chronicle's precursors were produced by confessional and ethnic minority groups, the persecuted Baptists and Crimean Tatars. A Chronicle of Current Events was created by dissenting members of Moscow's literary and scientific intelligentsia. Its editors and contributors were particularly affected by the August 1968 invasion of Czechoslovakia to which the third issue of the periodical and many subsequent reports and "Samizdat update" entries were devoted.

In time the Chronicle's coverage extended to almost all the constituent nations, confessional and ethnic groups of the Union of Soviet Socialist Republics, the one exception being Islam and the Central Asian republics.

"We are convinced that The Chronicle of Current Events is an historically necessary product of the ethical and social demands of Soviet society, a manifestation of the healthy spiritual forces in Soviet society." (Andrei Sakharov, Andrei Tverdokhlebov, Vladimir Albrecht, 28 May 1974)

The first editor and typist of the Chronicle was Natalya Gorbanevskaya. She was a major contributor to the publication and responsible for introducing its regular "Samizdat update" section. A participant in the 1968 Red Square demonstration, she was forced to undergo psychiatric examination, then and later. In 1970 she was tried and convicted and sent to the Kazan Special Psychiatric Hospital, from which she was released in 1972. (Note: CCE 24, 5 March 1972 — 24.10 "News in brief". Uncensored Russia – The Human Rights Movement in the Soviet Union. Peter Reddaway (ed). London: Andre Deutsch, 1972. pp 159–160)

Others stepped forward to take Gorbanevskaya's place (see Section The Editors, above) and were themselves, in turn, subjected to various forms of harassment and intimidation. This pattern would be repeated more than once over the next 13 years.

== See also ==
- Human rights movement in the Soviet Union
- Chronicle of the Catholic Church in Lithuania

== Bibliography ==
=== A Chronicle of Current Events ===
In Russian

Print (re-published abroad, 1969–82)

- Posev quarterly (Munich), issues 1–27 reprinted.
- Khronika tekushchikh sobytii. Amsterdam: Alexander Herzen Foundation, 1979. Nos. 1–15.
- Khronika tekushchikh sobytii. New York: Khronika Press, 1972 onwards. Nos. 30-58, 60–62.

Online

- Khronika tekushchikh sobytii ("Хроника текущих событий"), Moscow: Memorial, 2008. Nos. 1–58, 60–65. Issue Nos. 1–27 were posted online in 1998, Nos. 28–65 in 2002. (Tatyana Kudryavtseva and Alexander Cherkasov)
- Khronika tekushchikh sobytii ("Хроника текущих событий") Nos. 1–58, 60–65, wiki-linked version provided by Memorial

In English

Print

- Uncensored Russia – The Human Rights Movement in the Soviet Union. Peter Reddaway (ed). London: Andre Deutsch, 1972. Nos. 1–11.
- A Chronicle of Current Events. Zbynek Zeman (ed), Amnesty International, London. Nos. 16–58. ISSN 0254-6175 OCLC 474527391
- A Chronicle of Current Events. Amnesty International, London. Nos. 60–64.

Online

- A Chronicle of Current Events website providing access to all the issues translated into English (1–64). As of March 2025 nos. 1–58 had been scanned and digitized; the remaining six issues were still in pdf format.

=== A Chronicle of Human Rights in the USSR ===
- A Chronicle of Human Rights in the USSR. Valery Chaldize, Edward Kline, and Peter Reddaway (ed). New York: Khronika Press, 1973–82.
