= Initiative Group for the Defense of Human Rights in the USSR =

Soviet human rights non-governmental organization

- Инициативная группа по защите прав человека в СССР
- Formation: 19 May 1969
- Founders: Pyotr Yakir, Victor Krasin, 15 dissidents: Pyotr Yakir; Victor Krasin; Sergei Kovalev; Mustafa Dzhemilev; Tatyana Velikanova; Natalya Gorbanevskaya; Tatyana Khodorovich; Aleksandr Lavut; Anatoly Levitin-Krasnov; Yury Maltsev; Grigory Podyapolsky; Anatoly Yakobson; Vladimir Borisov; Genrikh Altunyan; Leonid Plyushch
- Founded at: Moscow, Russia
- Dissolved: 1979; 47 years ago
- Type: Association
- Purpose: Human rights monitoring

The Initiative or Action Group for the Defense of Human Rights in the USSR (Russian: Инициати́вная гру́ппа по защи́те прав челове́ка в СССР) was the first civic organization of the Soviet human rights movement. Founded in 1969 by 15 dissidents, the unsanctioned group functioned for over six years as a public platform for Soviet dissidents concerned with violations of human rights in the Soviet Union.

The main work of the group consisted in documenting abuses and preparing appeals. The letters focused on persecution of people for their convictions in the USSR, with particular attention being given to the use of punitive psychiatry and to political prisoners. Unusually for the dissident movement at the time, the appeals were directed to international organizations such as the UN Commission on Human Rights. The documents of the Initiative Group were circulated in samizdat, and published by the Western press, as well as being broadcast back into the USSR by radio stations such as Radio Liberty, the BBC World Service and Deutsche Welle.

Most of the members of the group were harassed and persecuted: they and family members lost their jobs, they were arrested and imprisoned, or encouraged to leave the Soviet Union altogether. By 1979, all the founding members of the Group were imprisoned, in internal exile or living abroad. The Initiative Group served as a precursor and model, nevertheless, to a variety of dissident organizations that took over many of its functions, among them Andrei Sakharov's Committee on Human Rights in the USSR, the Moscow Helsinki Group, and the Commission on the Abuse of Psychiatry.

== Founding ==
In late 1968, Ivan Yakhimovich, a philologist and chairman of a collective farm in Latvia, wrote a letter to the Communist Party expressing his concern for the fate of arrested samizdat authors Yuri Galanskov and Alexander Ginzburg. After the letter by Yakhimovich was widely publicized, he was expelled from the Communist Party, arrested and later committed to a psychiatric hospital without trial.

In April 1969 former general and dissident Pyotr Grigorenko met with fellow dissidents at his apartment and proposed creating a formal "Committee in Defense of Ivan Yakhimovich". The proposal elicited mixed reactions: Some dissidents advocated for a broader human rights group, while others doubted the effectiveness of a group over informal expressions of protest, and warned of the significantly harsher crackdowns organized activity would provoke under Anti-Soviet Agitation laws. The disputes came to a close in May, when a report by KGB chairman Yuri Andropov lead to the arrest of Grigorenko. This was followed by the arrest of poet Ilya Gabai, another luminary of the dissident movement.

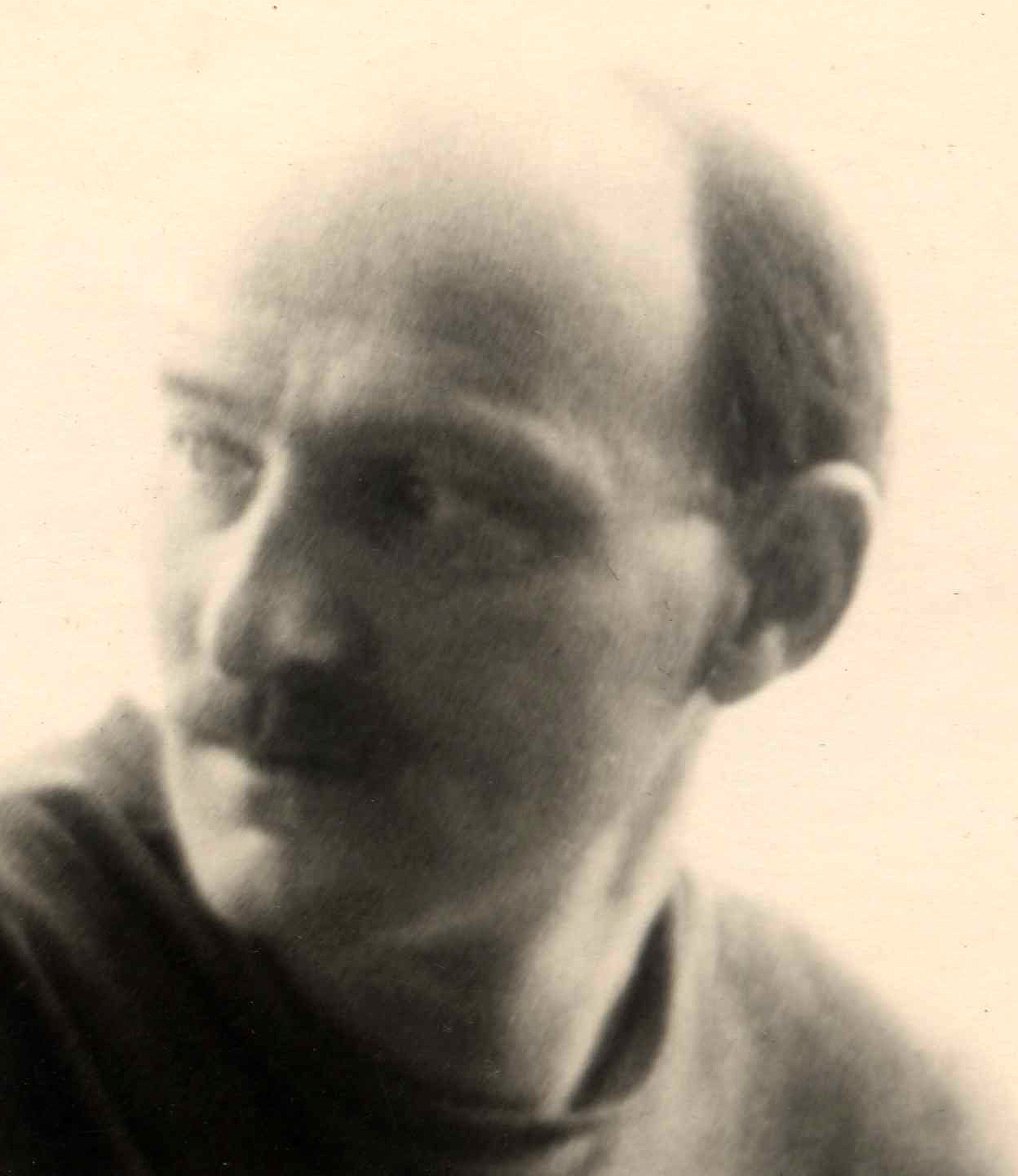
Victor Krasin, a founder of the Initiative Group for the Defense of Human Rights in the USSR

On 19 May 1969, the day of Ilya Gabai's arrest, a group of dissidents assembled at Pytor Yakir's apartment and agreed to join a proposed human rights group, modelled after the Initiative Groups of Crimean Tatars. As a first action, Victor Krasin drafted an appeal. It enumerated several political trials of the late 1960s, in which defendants were prosecuted for exercising the right to impart information. It was addressed to the United Nations and exhorted it to investigate human rights abuses in the Soviet Union:

We appeal to the United Nations because our protests and complaints, addressed for a number of years to the higher state and judicial offices in the Soviet Union, have received no response of any kind. The hope that our voice might be heard, that the authorities would cease the lawless acts which we constantly pointed out—this hope has been exhausted. Therefore we appeal to the United Nations, believing that the defense of human rights is the sacred duty of this organization.

The document was signed The Initiative Group for the Defense of Civil Rights in the USSR. This designation was followed by the names of fifteen dissidents: The Muscovites Tatyana Velikanova, Natalya Gorbanevskaya, Tatyana Khodorovich, Sergei Kovalev, Victor Krasin, Aleksandr Lavut, Anatoly Levitin-Krasnov, Yury Maltsev, Grigory Podyapolsky, Pyotr Yakir and Anatoly Yakobson, Vladimir Borisov from Leningrad, Ukrainians Genrikh Altunyan and Leonid Plyushch, and the Crimean Tatar activist in Uzbekistan Mustafa Dzhemilev. These names were supplemented by a list of 38 supporters.

On 20 May 1969, without consulting the other members of the group, Pyotr Yakir and Victor Krasin passed the text to foreign correspondents and a representative of the United Nations in Moscow. Expecting to first discuss the petition and further actions, all fifteen individuals had effectively become members of a new public organization. The members agreed to continue with appeals under that name, on the conditions that no member's name would be used as co-signatory without their express consent.

== History ==
=== First appeals (1969-1970) ===
Over the course of 1969, the Initiative Group sent four further letters to the United Nations. In each instance, it appealed for recognition and assistance with the human rights problems in the Soviet Union.

Document No. 2 (30 June 1969) was a supplement to its original petition. Written by Natalya Gorbanevskaya and Lyudmila Alexeyeva, it provided information about the case against Anatoly Marchenko and about the use of punitive psychiatry against Ivan Yakhimovich and Pyotr Grigorenko. As the letter reached the West through samizdat distribution and was picked up by shortwave radio stations, the members of the group were interrogated and some arrested.

Document No. 3 (26 September 1969) appealed personally to United Nations Secretary General U Thant. It reported the reaction of the Soviet authorities to the first two documents, which included the arrest of four members: Vladimir Borisov, Genrikh Altunyan, Anatoly Levitin-Krasnov, and Mustafa Dzhemilev, and called on U Thant to use his authority and place the violation of human rights in the USSR on the agenda. As the appeal reached the Western media, UN information centers around the world were instructed by its secretariat not to forward petitions to New York.

When these appeals to the UN went unanswered, the Initiative Group turned to other recipients: The World Health Organization and the International Congress of Psychiatrists for cases involving punitive psychiatry, the Papacy for the arrest of religious dissenters, news agencies such as Reuters, and simply "public opinion". By May 1970, six of the fifteen original members of the Initiative group had faced arrest or imprisonment.

=== Mission statement (1970) ===
In May 1970 the Initiative Group commemorated its first anniversary with an "Open Letter" addressed to Reuters and the Soviet press agency. Penned by mathematician Tatyana Velikanova, biologist Sergei Kovalev and poet Anatoly Yakobson, it set out three tenets that guided the group's activity: It aimed not only defend human rights, but by being a group itself assert the formally guaranteed freedom of association; the diverse group was unified by the conviction that "the foundation of a normal life of society is recognition of the unconditional value of the human individual"; and the group's activity in defense of human rights was not a form of politics:

The Initiative Group has no set program, no bylaws, and no defined structure. Each of us has the right to abstain from signing a document of the Group, and each of us has complete freedom when acting in his or her own name. [...] The Initiative Group does not get involved in politics. We don't lobby for any specific government measures. We only say: don't violate your own laws. While we don't engage in politics, we have no intention of becoming reconciled to the punitive measures directed against dissenters. Resistance to illegality, to the abuse of power, these are the tasks of the Initiative Group. The Initiative Group does not believe that it is attacking the state when it criticizes specific actions of the authorities.

In spite of these common goals, the Initiative group was marked by ideological differences. Some, like Sergei Kovalev and Anatoly Yakobson, saw their activity as strictly humanitarian and avoided actions that might be construed as treasonous or anti-Soviet; others like such as Pyotr Yakir, Victor Krasin and Anatoly Levitin-Krasnov, believed that they were engaged in a political struggle with the Soviet regime, and were open to cooperation with the NTS, an émigré anti-communist organization founded in 1930. These disagreements lead Kovalev, Yakobson and Alexander Lavut to threaten that they would leave the Initiative Group.

=== Case 24 and aftermath (1972-1973) ===
The members of the Initiative Group were closely linked with other dissident information networks. In April 1968, the samizdat (self-published) bulletin Chronicle of Current Events had begun circulation, reporting violations of civil rights and judicial procedure by the Soviet government and responses to those violations by citizens across the USSR. A succession of the Chronicle's editors came from the ranks of the Initiative Group.

In 1972 the KGB initiated Case 24, a wide-ranging crackdown intended to suppress the Chronicle. Three members of the Initiative Group were arrested that year. Leonid Plyushch endured four years of punitive psychiatry until he was released in 1976 and immigrated to the West. Pyotr Yakir and Victor Krasin began to collaborate with their interrogators. In a televised testimony, they recanted their "anti-Soviet activity" and renounced the Initiative Group as a fraudulent undertaking whose real purpose was the deception of international public opinion. The crackdown reduced the Initiative Group to five members.

Between July 1972 and December 1973, the Initiative Group issued only two documents, rejecting the accusations and reporting the conditions and procedure of interrogations. In 1974, it resumed its activity with a steady stream of protests focusing on the plight of inmates of the Gulag and psychiatric hospitals. As a result, a large volume of testimonies about prisons and camps entered the information networks of the movement.

=== Day of the Political Prisoner in the USSR (1974) ===
In 1974, the Initiative Group organized a "Day of the Political Prisoner in the USSR". The action had been conceived in the Gulag by astrophysicist Kronid Lyubarsky as part of an ongoing campaign for the recognition of inmates' status as political prisoners. Wives of inmates smuggled information about the planned action out of the Mordovian and Perm labor camps and out of Vladimir prison to the Moscow dissident community.

On 30 October 1974, the Initiative Group held a press conference at the apartment of Andrei Sakharov. Speaking before invited foreign correspondents, Sergei Kovalev, Tatyana Velikanova, Tatyana Khodorovich and Alexander Lavut reported the origins of the event in the Gulag and the spectrum of political prisoners in the USSR. In the name of the Initiative Group, a statement was distributed explaining the origins of the action and contradicting the Soviet regime's claim that it did not have political prisoners. While the press conference was in progress, inmates in Vladimir Prison and in camps in Perm and Mordovia conducted a hunger strike.

Kovalev was arrested two months later, and his role in the press conference featured prominently in his interrogations. Nevertheless, the Day of the Political Prisoner became an annual event in the Gulag. In 1991 the annual event was supplanted by Russia's official Day of Remembrance of the Victims of Political Repressions.

=== End of activities and Moscow Helsinki Group (1976) ===
By March 1976, of the members of the Initiative Group only Tatyana Velikanova and Tatyana Khodorovich remained at liberty. In November 1977, Khodorovich emigrated to the West. Velikanova continued to sign documents in the name of the Group for another two years, before her arrest in November 1979 marked the formal end of the Initiative Group as a public structure. A final appeal from 17 November 1981 was smuggled out of the women's zone of the Mordovan labor camps. Calling attention to the treatment of infirm and elderly inmates, it was signed by dissident Tatyana Osipova and by Tatyana Velikanova, who described herself as "Member of the Initiative Group for the Defense of Human Rights in the USSR".

The Initiative Group survived long enough to pass on the baton to other emerging human rights groups in the Soviet Union during the later 1970s. The last statements by its remaining members — Grigory Podyapolsky (died 9 March 1976), Tatyana Velikanova, and Tatyana Khodorovich — were supported by other dissidents who would become members of the new Moscow Helsinki Group: Yuri Orlov, Malva Landa, and Lyudmila Alekseeva. Established in May 1976, the Moscow Helsinki Group quickly assumed the Initiative Group's role as flagship of the human rights movement in the USSR.

== See also ==
- Committee on Human Rights in the USSR
- Moscow Helsinki Group

== Bibliography ==
- Alexeyeva, Lyudmila (1993). The Thaw Generation: Coming of Age in the Post-Stalin Era. Pittsburgh, PA: University of Pittsburgh Press. ISBN 978-0-8229-5911-3.
- Gilligan, Emma (2004). Defending Human Rights in Russia: Sergei Kovalyov, Dissident and Human Rights Commissioner, 1969-2003. London. ISBN 978-0-415-54611-9.
- Horvath, Robert (2014). "Breaking the Totalitarian Ice: The Initiative Group for the Defense of Human Rights in the USSR". Human Rights Quarterly. 36 (1): 147–175. doi:10.1353/hrq.2014.0013. ISSN 1085-794X. S2CID 144147528.
