= Sergei Kovalev =

Russian human rights activist and politician (1930–2021)

- Сергей Ковалёв
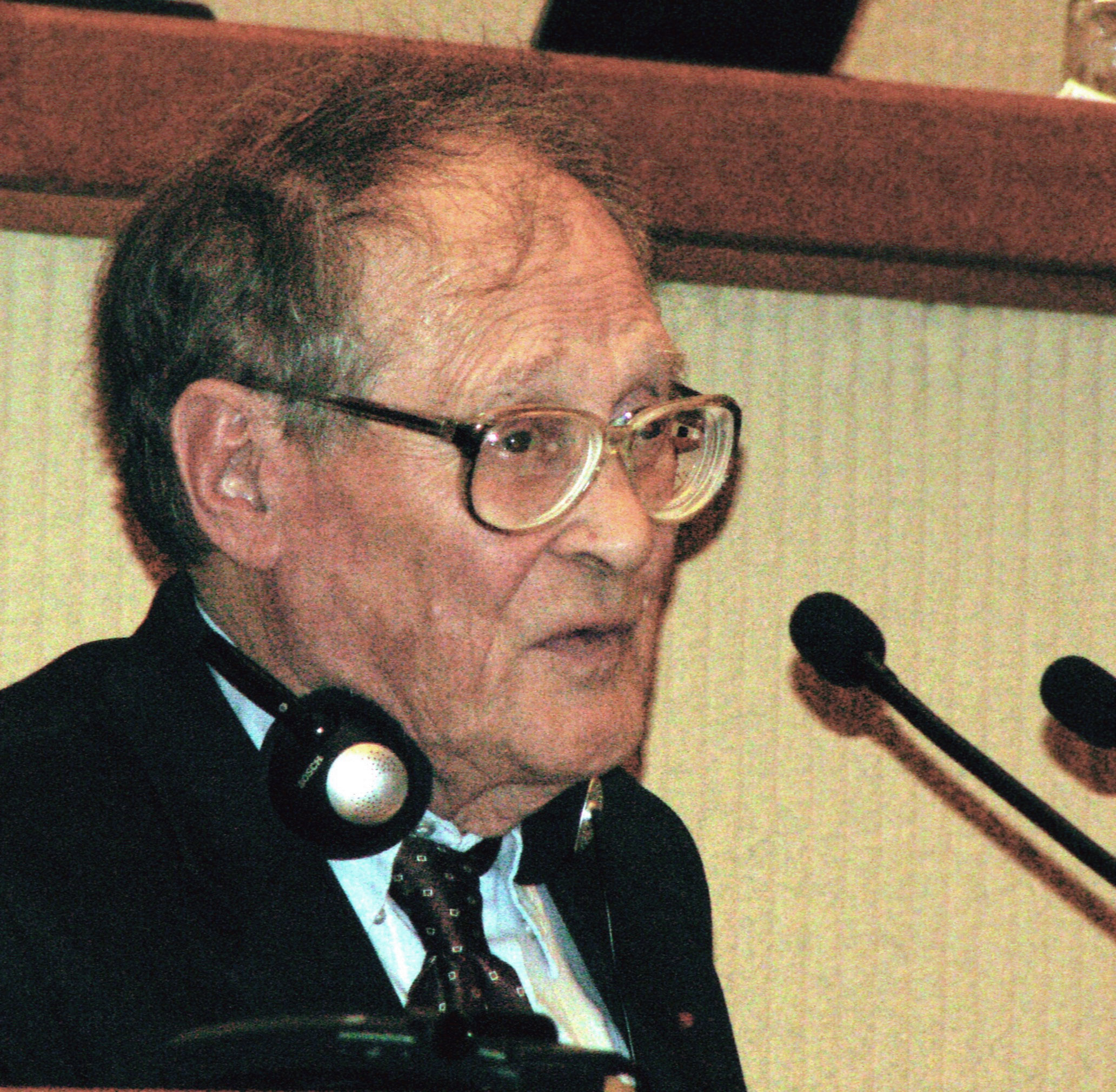
- Kovalyov in 2009

Commissioner for Human Rights
- In office 17 January 1994 – 10 March 1995
- President: Boris Yeltsin
- Preceded by: Position established
- Succeeded by: Oleg Mironov

Member of the State Duma
- In office 12 December 1993 – 7 December 2003
- Preceded by: Position established
- Succeeded by: Sergei Shokhin
- Constituency: Chertanovo (1993–1999); Union of Right Forces list (1999–2003)

Personal details
- Born: 2 March 1930 Seredyna-Buda, Ukrainian SSR, Soviet Union
- Died: 9 August 2021 (aged 91) Moscow, Russia
- Party: Democratic Choice of Russia
- Children: Ivan; Maria, Varvara
- Education: Moscow State University (1954)
- Occupation: Biophysicist, politician
- Awards: Geuzenpenning, Légion d'honneur, Sakharov Prize, Victor Gollancz Prize, Olof Palme Prize, Order of the Cross of Terra Mariana, Order of Merit of the Republic of Poland, Order of Tomáš Garrigue Masaryk, Lithuanian Freedom Award
- Kovalev's voice Interview with Echo of Moscow; Recorded 5 May 2014

Sergei Adamovich Kovalyov (also spelled Sergey Kovalev; Russian: Сергей Адамович Ковалёв; 2 March 1930 – 9 August 2021) was a Russian human rights activist and politician. During the Soviet period he was a dissident and, after 1975, a political prisoner.

== Early career and arrest ==
Kovalyov was born in the town of Seredyna-Buda, near Sumy (in Soviet Union, now Ukraine). In 1932, his family moved to Podlipki village near Moscow. In 1954, Kovalyov graduated from Moscow State University and in 1964 he gained a PhD in biophysics. As a biophysicist, Kovalyov was author of more than 60 scientific publications. From the mid-1950s onwards, as a graduate student and a lecturer he opposed Trofim Lysenko's theories, then favored by Khrushchev and the ruling Communist Party of the Soviet Union.

In 1969 Kovalyov was one of a group of dissidents who set up the Action Group for the Defense of Human Rights in the USSR, the first such independent body in the Soviet Union. The 14 members of the group first drew public and international attention when they and 38 supporters signed an Appeal about political persecution in the USSR and sent it, over the head of the Soviet government, to the United Nations; meanwhile a number of them also became involved as authors and editors in the samizdat (self-published) human rights quarterly, the Chronicle of Current Events (1968–1983) which first appeared in April 1968. The members of the Action Group came under pressure from the authorities and their statements and activities became intermittent.

After signing the May 1969 Appeal to the UN Human Rights Commission Sergei Kovalyov went on to sign many statements and appeals, in defense of other dissidents, authors and rights activists: Vladimir Bukovsky, Mustafa Dzhemilev, Pyotr Grigorenko, Viktor Khaustov, Viktor Nekipelov, Leonid Plyushch, Yuri Shikhanovich, Aleksandr Solzhenitsyn and Gabriel Superfin. (See the charge sheet at his 1975 trial in Vilnius.)

Following the arrest of Pyotr Yakir in June 1972 the Chronicle did not appear for over a year. On 7 May 1974, Kovalyov, Tatyana Velikanova and Tatyana Khodorovich gave a press conference for foreign journalists, declaring their determination to renew distribution of the bulletin, starting with the three postponed issues. (They were among the editors of the Chronicle but did not admit so at the time.) As a consequence two of them were arrested and imprisoned and the third, Tatyana Khodorovich, was forced into emigration. Kovalyov was the first to be detained. He was arrested on 27 December 1974 in Moscow and twelve months later he was put on trial in the Lithuanian capital Vilnius, charged with "anti-Soviet agitation and propaganda" . Sentenced to ten years imprisonment and exile under Article 70, a "particularly grave crime against the State", Kovalyov served seven years in strict-regime penitentiary facilities for political prisoners (Perm-36 in the Urals and Chistopol Prison in Tatarstan) followed by three years of exile in Kolyma in the Soviet Far East. On completing his sentence at the end of 1984, he was allowed to settle in Kalinin (today Tver) in central Russia.

== Perestroika, 1985–1991 ==
The six years of reform initiated by the last Soviet leader Mikhail Gorbachev, often referred to as perestroika and glasnost, led to the release in 1987 of hundreds of political prisoners from the camps, from exile and from psychiatric hospitals, and lifted residence restrictions from those who had completed their sentences. Kovalyov was thus allowed to return to Moscow in 1987.

He became actively involved in a number of organisations that emerged then. In 1989, for instance, Andrei Sakharov recommended him as a co-director of the Project Group for defense of Human Rights, the short-lived Russian-American Human Rights Group. Some bodies like the "Glasnost" press club and the International Humanitarian Conference (December 1987) did not outlast the period: the Gorbachev Politburo was not keen to allow former dissidents to organise national or international gatherings, as their discussions reveal. The Politburo and the KGB were similarly wary of Memorial, another new organisation that survives until this day. Its dual focus on the repressive Soviet past and the human rights issues of the present, made it particularly suitable for Kovalyov's involvement and he served as its co-chairman for many years after 1990.

== Post-Soviet Russia ==
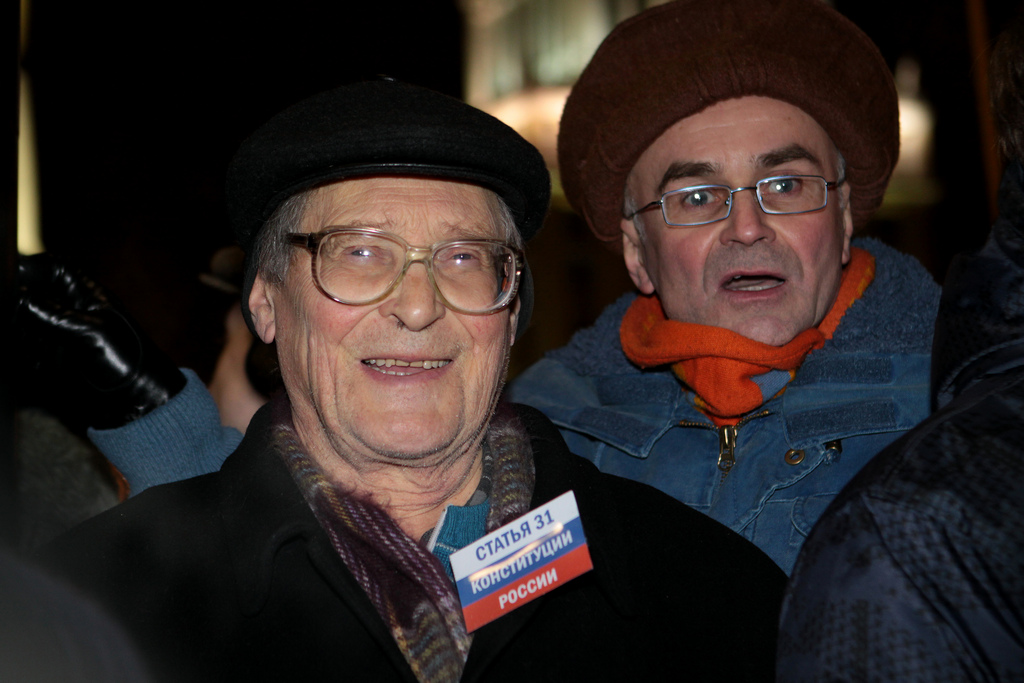
Kovalev at the Strategy-31 rally in defense of Article 31 (Freedom of assembly) of the Constitution of Russia. Moscow, 31 January 2010

After the dissolution of the Soviet Union, Kovalyov turned to official politics. In January 1991, he coauthored the Declaration of Human and Civil Rights in Russia and was a major contributor to Article 2 (Rights and Liberties of Man and Citizen) of the Constitution of the Russian Federation.

From 1990 to 1993, he was an elected People's Deputy of the Russian Federation, and a member of the Presidium of the Supreme Council of the Russian Federation. He served as the chairman of the President's Human Rights Commission and Human Rights Commissioner for the Russian parliament, the State Duma.

From 1993 until 2003, Kovalyov was a member of the Russian State Duma. From 1996 to 2003 he was also a member of the Russian delegation to the Parliamentary Assembly of the Council of Europe and a member of the Assembly's Committee on Legal Affairs and Human Rights.

In 1993, he co-founded the movement and later, the political party Choice of Russia (Выбор России), later renamed Democratic Choice of Russia (Демократический выбор России). Since 1994, Kovalyov, then Yeltsin's human rights adviser, has been publicly opposed to Russia's military involvement in Chechnya. From Grozny, he witnessed the realities of the First Chechen War. His daily reports via telephone and on TV galvanized Russian public opinion against the war. For his activism, he was removed from his post in the Duma in 1995. In 1994, he was awarded the Homo Homini Award for human rights activism by the Czech group People in Need.

Kovalyov has been an outspoken critic of authoritarian tendencies in the administrations of Boris Yeltsin and Vladimir Putin. In 1996, he resigned as head of Yeltsin's presidential human rights commission, having published an open letter to Yeltsin, where Kovalyov accused the president of giving up democratic principles. In 2002, he organized a public commission to investigate the 1999 Moscow apartment bombings (the Kovalyov Commission), which was effectively paralyzed after one of its members, Sergei Yushenkov, was assassinated, another member, Yuri Shchekochikhin, allegedly poisoned with thallium, and its legal counsel and investigator, Mikhail Trepashkin, arrested.

In 2005, he participated in They Chose Freedom, a four-part television documentary on the history of the Soviet dissident movement.

Kovalyov opposed the 2008 Russian invasion of Georgia and following Russian recognition of the self-proclaimed Georgian breakaway states Abkhazia and South Ossetia.

In March 2010, Kovalyov signed the online anti-Putin manifesto of the Russian opposition, "Putin must go".

Kovalyov spoke out against the 2014 Russian annexation of Crimea and Russia's military, political, and economic support for the self-proclaimed Ukrainian breakaway states Donetsk People's Republic and Luhansk People's Republic.

Kovalyov died aged 91 in his sleep in Moscow on 9 August 2021.

== Awards ==
Kovalyov is a recipient of numerous awards and honorary titles. In 2004, he was awarded the Victor Gollancz Prize by the Society for Threatened Peoples, for documenting Russian crimes in Chechnya. Kovalyov was also a joint recipient, with Anna Politkovskaya and Lyudmila Alexeyeva, of the 2004 Olof Palme Prize. In 2011, he was honored with the Lithuanian Freedom Award for his adherence to democratic values and ideals of freedom.

== Works ==
=== Books ===
- Der Flug des weißen Raben: von Sibirien nach Tschetschenien: eine Lebensreise [The flight of the white raven: from Siberia to Chechnya: Autobiography] (in German). Rowohlt Berlin. 1997. ISBN 978-3871342561.
- Russlands schwieriger Weg und sein Platz in Europa [Russia's difficult path and its place in Europe] (in German). Jena: Collegium Europaeum Jenense an der Friedrich-Schiller Universität Jena. 1999. ISBN 978-3933159052.
- Hood, Roger; Kovalev, Sergei (1999). The death penalty: abolition in Europe. Strasbourg: Council of Europe Pub. ISBN 978-9287138743.
- Прагматика политического идеализма [Pragmatics of political idealism] (in Russian). Moscow: Институт прав человека. 1999. OCLC 162477430.
- Мир, страна, личность [World, country, personality] (in Russian). Moscow: Изограф. 2000. ISBN 978-5871130858.

=== Articles ===
- Kovalev, Sergei (8 June 1995). "Death in Chechnya". The New York Review of Books.
- "How the West should not to react to events in Russia?" (PDF). Transition. 1 (9): 42–43. 9 June 1995. Archived (PDF) from the original on 26 March 2016.
- Kovalev, Sergei (1996). "Human rights: old griefs revisited". Index on Censorship. 25 (3): 54–58. doi:10.1080/03064229608536075.
- Fitzpatrick, Catherine A.; Kovalev, Sergei (29 February 1996). "A letter of resignation". The New York Review of Books.
- Kovalev, Sergei (18 April 1996). "On the New Russia". The New York Review of Books.
- Открытое письмо Сергея Ковалева Б.Н.Ельцину и А.И.Лебедю [Sergei Kovalev's open letter to B.N. Yeltsin and A.I. Lebed] (in Russian). 15 July 1996.
- "Human rights were the big losers in Russia's election". New Perspectives Quarterly. 13: 39–40. 22 June 1996. Archived from the original on 17 November 2015 – via HighBeam Research.
- Kovalev, Sergei (17 July 1997). "Russia after Chechnya". The New York Review of Books: 27–31. Archived (PDF) from the original on 26 March 2016.
- "Andrei Dmitrievich Sakharov: meeting the demands of reason". Izvestiya. 21 May 1998. Archived from the original on 23 February 2016.
- Kamau, John; Jere-Malanda, Regina; Rogers, Daniel; Clayton, Rupert; Kendle, Andrew; Pilch, Ruth; Richards, Catherine; Martin, Simon; Cortés, Dolores; Azad, Arif; Newsham, Gill; Sammonds, Neil; Elkin, Andrew; Callaghan, Tony (1999). "Russia – Murder incorporated". Index on Censorship. 28 (1): 96–97. doi:10.1080/03064229908536512. S2CID 220988419.
- Kovalev, Sergei (2000). "Men and messiahs". Index on Censorship. 29 (4): 30–31. doi:10.1080/03064220008536757.
- Kovalev, Sergei (10 February 2000). "Putin's war". The New York Review of Books.
- Kovalev, Sergei (9 August 2001). "The Putin put-on". The New York Review of Books.
- Kovalev, Sergei (22 November 2007). "Why Putin wins". The New York Review of Books.
- Kovalev, Sergueï (2009). "Éthique et "RealPolitik"" [Ethics and "realpolitik"]. La Revue Russe (in French). 33 (1): 25–30. doi:10.3406/russe.2009.2382.
- "За идеал ответишь? Об ответственности интеллектуалов: пора резко противопоставить чувство собственного достоинства так называемой real politics" [Will you pay the full penalty for ideal? On the responsibility of intellectuals: it is time to sharply oppose the feeling of self-esteem to so-called real politics]. Novaya Gazeta (in Russian). No. 75. 15 July 2009.
- "О тщеславии и вранье" О тщеславии и вранье. Ответ с переходом на личности [About vanity and lies. The answer with ad hominem argument]. Novaya Gazeta (in Russian). No. 115. 14 October 2013.
- "В нынешних конфликтах стороны всегда ищут опору в понятии «патриотизм". Лекция Сергея Адамовича Ковалева на собственном юбилее в международном центре "Мемориал" ["In current conflicts, the parties are always looking for a foothold in the concept of "patriotism." Sergei Adamovich Kovalev's lecture on his own anniversary at the International Center "Memorial"]. Novaya Gazeta (in Russian). No. 24. 11 March 2015.
- Открытое письмо Сергея Ковалева [An open letter by Sergei Kovalev]. Novaya Gazeta (in Russian). No. 65. 15 June 2015.
- Тень ГУЛАГа [The shadow of Gulag] (in Russian). 5 May 2015.
