= Sluggish schizophrenia =

Controversial psychiatric diagnosis

Sluggish schizophrenia or slow progressive schizophrenia (Russian: вялотеку́щая шизофрени́я, romanized: vyalotekushchaya shizofreniya) was a diagnostic category used in the Soviet Union to describe what was claimed to be a form of schizophrenia characterized by a slowly progressive course; it was diagnosed even in patients who showed no symptoms of schizophrenia or other psychotic disorders, on the assumption that these symptoms would appear later. It was developed in the 1960s by Soviet psychiatrist Andrei Snezhnevsky and his colleagues, and was used exclusively in the USSR and several Eastern Bloc countries, until the fall of Communism starting in 1989. The diagnosis has long been discredited because of its scientific inadequacy and its use as a means of confining dissenters. It has never been used or recognized outside of the Eastern Bloc, or by international organizations such as the World Health Organization. It is considered a prime example of the political abuse of psychiatry in the Soviet Union.

Sluggish schizophrenia was the most infamous of diagnoses used by Soviet psychiatrists, due to its usage against political dissidents. After being discharged from a hospital, persons diagnosed with sluggish schizophrenia were deprived of their civic rights, credibility and employability. The usage of this diagnosis has been internationally condemned.

In the Russian version of the 10th revision of the International Statistical Classification of Diseases and Related Health Problems (ICD-10), which has long been used throughout present-day Russia, sluggish schizophrenia is no longer listed as a form of schizophrenia, but it is still included as a schizotypal disorder in section F21 of chapter V.

According to Sergei Jargin, the same Russian term "vyalotekushchaya" for sluggish schizophrenia continues to be used and is now translated in English summaries of articles not as "sluggish" but as "slow progressive".

== Development of theory ==
The term "sluggish schizophrenia" was introduced in the Soviet Union in the 1930s by Dr. Grunia Sukhareva. Sukhareva first used the term in a 1933 article in which she described a type of schizophrenia that developed slowly in children beginning before puberty. Sukhareva's term became a standard part of Soviet textbooks on schizophrenia in the 1940s. In the 1960s, Professor Andrei Snezhnevsky, the most prominent theorist of Soviet psychiatry and director of the Institute of Psychiatry of the USSR Academy of Medical Sciences, developed a novel classification of mental disorders postulating an original set of diagnostic criteria. Snezhnevsky and his colleagues who developed the concept were supported by Soviet psychiatrists Fedor Kondratev, Sergei Semyonov, and Yakov Frumkin. All were members of the "Moscow school" of psychiatry.

A majority of experts believe that the concept was developed under instructions from the Soviet secret service KGB and the Communist Party.

== Use against political dissidents ==
Psychiatric diagnoses such as sluggish schizophrenia were used in the USSR for political purposes; the diagnosis of sluggish schizophrenia was most frequently used for Soviet dissidents. Sluggish schizophrenia as a diagnostic category was created to facilitate the stifling of dissidents and was a root of self-deception among psychiatrists to placate their consciences when the doctors acted as a tool of oppression in the name of a political system. American psychiatrist Peter Breggin points out that the term "sluggish schizophrenia" was created to justify involuntary treatment of political dissidents with drugs normally used for psychiatric patients.

Critics implied that Snezhnevsky designed the Soviet model of schizophrenia (and this diagnosis) to make political dissent a mental illness.

St. Petersburg academic psychiatrist professor Yuri Nuller notes that the concept of Snezhnevsky's school allowed psychiatrists to consider, for example, schizoid psychopathy and even schizoid character traits as early, delayed in their development, stages of the inevitable progredient process, rather than as personality traits inherent to the individual, the dynamics of which might depend on various external factors. The same also applied to a number of other personality disorders. It entailed the extremely broadened diagnostics of sluggish (neurosis-like, psychopathy-like) schizophrenia. Despite a number of its controversial premises, but in line with the traditions of then Soviet science, Snezhnevsky's hypothesis immediately acquired the status of dogma, which was later overcome in other disciplines but firmly stuck in psychiatry. Snezhnevsky's concept, with its dogmatism, proved to be psychologically comfortable for many psychiatrists, relieving them from doubt when making a diagnosis.

On the covert orders of the KGB, thousands of social and political reformers—Soviet dissidents—were incarcerated in mental hospitals after being labelled with diagnoses of sluggish schizophrenia. Snezhnevsky himself diagnosed, or was otherwise involved in, a series of famous dissident cases, and in dozens of cases he personally signed a commission decision on the legal insanity of dissidents who were in fact mentally healthy, including Vladimir Bukovsky, Natalya Gorbanevskaya, Leonid Plyushch, Mikola Plakhotnyuk, and Pyotr Grigorenko.

== Premises for using the diagnosis ==
According to the Global Initiative on Psychiatry chief executive Robert van Voren, the political abuse of psychiatry in the USSR arose from the concept that people who opposed the Soviet regime were mentally ill (since there was no logical reason to oppose the sociopolitical system considered the best in the world). The diagnosis of sluggish schizophrenia furnished a framework for explaining this behavior. This seemed to many Soviet psychiatrists a logical explanation for why someone would be willing to abandon his happiness, family, and career for a conviction so different from what most individuals seemed to believe.

== Popularity of diagnosis ==
Because of diagnoses of sluggish schizophrenia, Russia in 1974 had 5–7 cases of schizophrenia per 1,000 population, compared to 3–4 per 1,000 in the United Kingdom. In the 1980s, Russia had three times as many schizophrenic patients per capita as the US, twice as many schizophrenic patients as West Germany, Austria and Japan, and more schizophrenic patients than any Western country. The city with the highest diagnosed prevalence of schizophrenia in the world was Moscow.

Along with paranoia, sluggish schizophrenia was the diagnosis most frequently used for the psychiatric incarceration of dissenters. Darrel Regier of the National Institute of Mental Health, one of the U.S. experts who visited Soviet psychiatric hospitals in 1989, testified that a "substantial number" of political dissenters had been recognized as mentally sick on the basis of such symptoms as "anti-Soviet thoughts" or "delusions of reformism".

According to Moscow psychiatrist Alexander Danilin, the nosological approach in the Moscow psychiatric school established by Andrei Snezhnevsky (whom Danilin considered a state criminal) boiled down to the ability to diagnose schizophrenia.

== Systematics by Snezhnevsky ==
The Soviet model of schizophrenia is based on the hypothesis that a fundamental characteristic (by which schizophrenia spectrum disorders are distinguished clinically) is its longitudinal course. The hypothesis implies three main types of schizophrenia:

- Continuous: unremitting, proceeding rapidly ("malignant") or slowly ("sluggish"), with a poor prognosis
- Periodic (or recurrent): characterized by an acute attack, followed by full remission with little or no progression
- Mixed (German: schubweise; in German, schub means "phase" or "attack"): mixture of continuous and periodic types which occurs periodically and is characterized by only partial remission.

The classification of schizophrenia types attributed to Snezhnevsky is still used in Russia, and considers sluggish schizophrenia an example of the continuous type. The prevalence of Snezhnevsky's theories has particularly led to a broadening of the boundaries of disease such that even the mildest behavioral change is interpreted as indication of mental disorder.

=== Conditions posed as symptoms ===
A carefully crafted description of sluggish schizophrenia established that psychotic symptoms were non-essential for the diagnosis, but symptoms of psychopathy, hypochondria, depersonalization or anxiety were central to it. Symptoms considered part of the "negative axis" included pessimism, poor social adaptation and conflict with authorities, and were themselves sufficient for a formal diagnosis of "sluggish schizophrenia with few symptoms". According to Snezhnevsky, patients with sluggish schizophrenia could present as seemingly sane but manifest minimal (and clinically relevant) personality changes which could remain unnoticed by the untrained eye. Patients with non-psychotic mental disorders (or who were not mentally ill) could be diagnosed with sluggish schizophrenia.

Harold Merskey and Bronislava Shafran write that many conditions which would probably be diagnosed elsewhere as hypochondriacal or personality disorders, anxiety disorders or depressive disorders appear liable to come under the banner of slowly progressive schizophrenia in Snezhnevsky's system.

The incidence of sluggish schizophrenia increased because, according to Snezhnevsky and his colleagues, patients with this diagnosis were capable of socially functioning almost normally. Their symptoms could resemble those of a neurosis or paranoia. Patients with paranoid symptoms retained insight into their condition, but overestimated their significance and had grandiose ideas of reforming society. Sluggish schizophrenia could have such symptoms as "reform delusions", "perseverance" and "struggle for the truth". As Viktor Styazhkin reported, Snezhnevsky diagnosed a reform delusion in every case where a patient "develops a new principle of human knowledge, drafts an ideal of human happiness or other projects for the benefit of mankind".

During the 1960s and 1970s, theories which contained ideas about reforming society, struggling for the truth, and religious convictions were not considered delusional paranoid disorders in nearly any foreign classifications; however, Soviet psychiatry (for ideological reasons) considered critiques of the political system and proposals to reform it as delusional behavior. The diagnoses of sluggish schizophrenia and paranoid states with delusions of reform were used only in the Soviet Union and several Eastern European countries.

An audience member at a lecture by Georgi Morozov on forensic psychiatry in the Serbsky Institute asked, "Tell us, Georgi Vasilevich, what is actually the diagnosis of sluggish schizophrenia?" Since the question was asked ironically Morozov replied ironically: "You know, dear colleagues, this is a very peculiar disease. There are not delusional disorders, there are not hallucinations, but there is schizophrenia!"

The two Soviet psychiatrists Marat Vartanyan and Andrei Mukhin in their interview to the Soviet newspaper Komsomolskaya Pravda issued on 15 July 1987 explained how it was possible that a person might be mentally ill, while people surrounding him did not notice it, for example, in the case of "sluggish schizophrenia". What was meant by saying that a person is mentally ill? Marat Vartanyan said, "... When a person is obsessively occupied with something. If you discuss another subject with him, he is a normal person who is healthy, and who may be your superior in intelligence, knowledge and eloquence. But as soon as you mention his favourite subject, his pathological obsessions flare up wildly." Vartanyan confirmed that hundreds of people with this diagnosis were hospitalized in the Soviet Union. According to Mukhin, it took place because "they disseminate their pathological reformist ideas among the masses." A few months later the same newspaper listed "an exceptional interest in philosophical systems, religion and art" among symptoms of sluggish schizophrenia from a Manual on Psychiatry of Snezhnevsky's Moscow school.

== Recognizing method, treatment and study ==
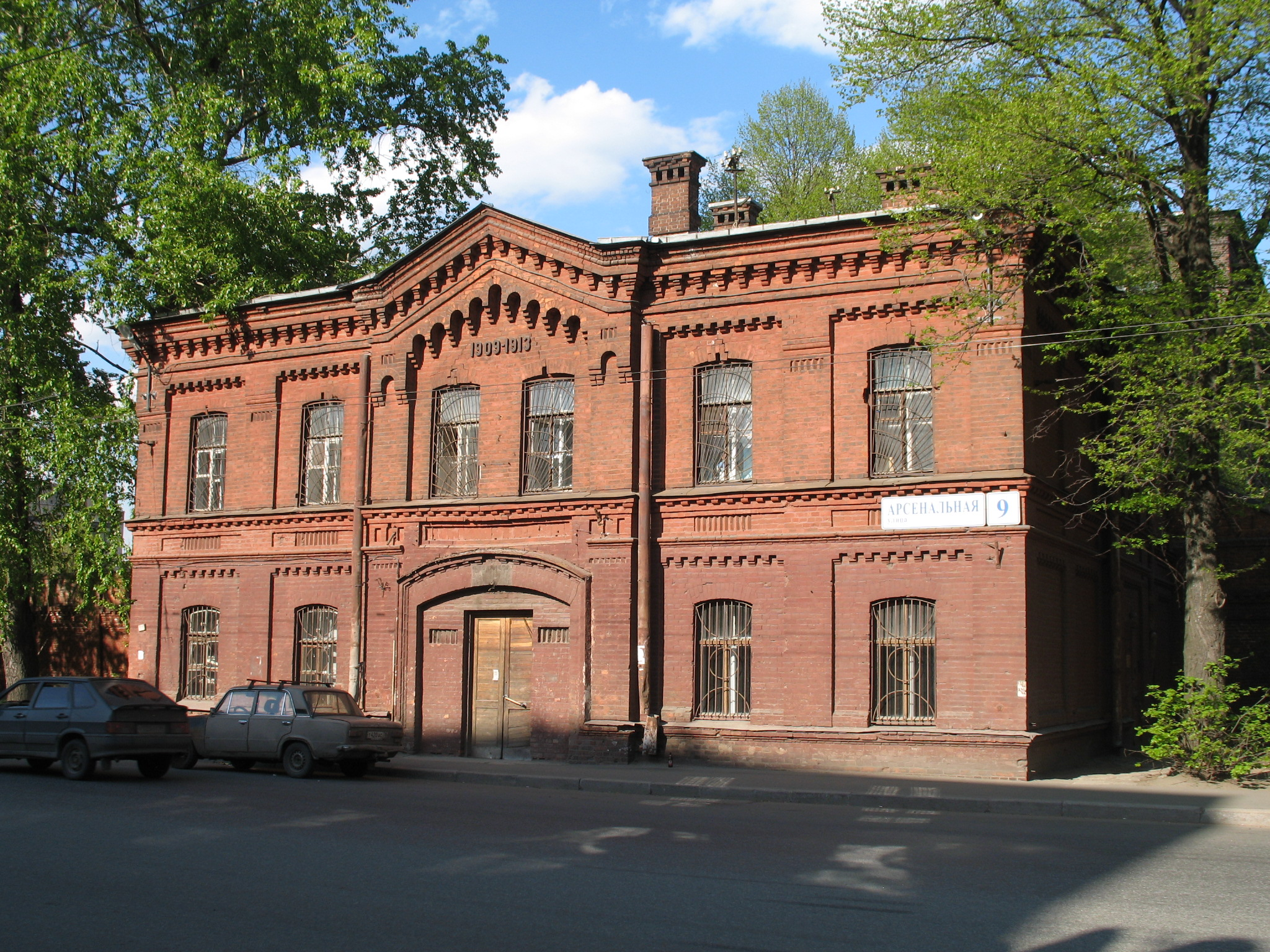
The Leningrad Special Psychiatric Hospital of Prison Type of the USSR Ministry of Internal Affairs where Vladimir Bukovsky, Pyotr Grigorenko, Alexander Yesenin-Volpin and Viktor Fainberg were imprisoned was one of the psychiatric hospitals of a special type used to "treat" litigiousness and reformism

Only specially instructed psychiatrists could recognize sluggish schizophrenia to indefinitely treat dissenters in a "Special Psychiatric Hospital" with heavy doses of antipsychotic medication. Convinced of the immortality of the totalitarian USSR, Soviet psychiatrists, especially in Moscow, did not hesitate to form "scientific" articles and defend dissertations by using the cases of dissidents. For example, Snezhnevsky diagnosed dissident Vladimir Bukovsky as schizophrenic on 5 July 1962 and on 12 November 1971 wrote to writer Viktor Nekrasov that the characteristics of Bukovsky's mental disease were included in the dissertation by Snezhnevsky's colleague. All the paper products were available in medical libraries. As Semyon Gluzman recollects, when he returned to Kiev in 1982 after his absence of ten years, he was amazed to see all this "scientific" literature in open storage at the Kiev medical library and was even more amazed to read all the "ridiculous stuff" hardly put into scientific psychiatric terminology. In their papers and dissertations on treatment for litigiousness and reformism, Kosachyov and other Soviet psychiatrists recommended compulsory treatment for persons with litigiousness and reformism, in the same psychiatric hospitals used for murderers:

Compulsory treatment in psychiatric hospitals of special type is to be recommended in cases of brutal murders committed on delusional grounds as well as in cases of persistent litigiousness and reformism with an inclination to induce surrounding persons and with a tendency to repetition of the illegal acts.

== Western criticism ==
Westerners first became aware of sluggish schizophrenia and its political uses in the mid-1970s, as a result of the high reported incidence of schizophrenia in the Russian population. Snezhnevsky was personally attacked in the West as an example of psychiatric abuse in the USSR. He was charged with cynically developing a system of diagnosis that could be bent for political purposes. American psychiatrist Alan A. Stone stated that Western criticism of Soviet psychiatry focused on Snezhnevsky personally because he was responsible for the diagnosis of sluggish schizophrenia for "reformism" and other such symptoms.

== Recurrence in post-Soviet countries ==
In 2010, Yuri Savenko, the president of the Independent Psychiatric Association of Russia, warned that Professor Anatoly Smulevich, author of the monographs Problema Paranoyi (The Problem of Paranoia) (1972) and Maloprogredientnaya Shizofreniya (Continuous Sluggish Schizophrenia) (1987), which had contributed to the hyperdiagnosis of sluggish schizophrenia, had again begun to play the same role. Under his influence, therapists have begun to widely use antidepressants and antipsychotics but often in inadequate cases and in inappropriate doses, without consulting psychiatrists. This situation has opened up a huge new market for pharmaceutical firms, and the flow of the mentally ill to internists.

In their joint book Sociodinamicheskaya Psikhiatriya (Sociodynamic Psychiatry), Doctor of Medical Sciences professor of psychiatry Caesar Korolenko and Doctor of Psychological Sciences Nina Dmitrieva note that Smulevich's clinical description of sluggish schizophrenia is extremely elusive and includes almost all possible changes in mental status and conditions that occur in a person without psychopathology: euphoria, hyperactivity, unfounded optimism, irritability, explosiveness, sensitivity, inadequacy and emotional deficit, hysterical reactions with conversive and dissociative symptoms, infantilism, obsessive-phobic states and stubbornness. At present, the hyperdiagnosis of schizophrenia becomes especially negative due to a large number of schizophreniform psychoses caused by the increasing popularity of various esoteric sects. They practice meditation, sensory deprivation, special exercises with rhythmic movements which directly stimulate the deep subconscious and, by doing so, lead to the development of psychoses with mainly reversible course. Smulevich bases the diagnosis of continuous sluggish schizophrenia, in particular, on appearance and lifestyle and stresses that the forefront in the picture of negative changes is given to the contrast between retaining mental activity (and sometimes quite high capacity for work) and mannerism, unusualness of one's appearance and entire lifestyle. In his 2014 interview, Anatoly Smulevich says, "Now everything has slightly turned in a different way, sluggish schizophrenia has been transformed into schizotypal disorder, etc. I think it is not the end of his [Snezhnevsky's] teaching, because after a while, everything will get back into a rut, but it will not be a simple repetition but will get some new direction."

In 2009, Tatyana Dmitrieva, the then director of the Serbsky Center, said to the BBC Russian Service, "A diagnosis is now made only according to the international classification, so called ICD-10. In this classification, there is no sluggish schizophrenia, and therefore, even this diagnosis has not just been made for a long time." However, according to the 2012 interview by the president of the Ukrainian Psychiatric Association Semyon Gluzman to Radio Liberty, though the diagnosis of sluggish schizophrenia no longer exists in Ukraine, in Russia, as far as he knows, this diagnosis still exists, and was given to Mikhail Kosenko, one of the accused in the Bolotnaya Square case. The prosecution's case for his forced hospitalization rested on confirmation of the diagnosis of sluggish schizophrenia that he has been treated for over the last 12 years, until 2013 when the diagnosis was changed to that of paranoid schizophrenia by the Serbsky Center experts who examined Kosenko and convinced the court to send him for compulsory treatment to a psychiatric hospital. Zurab Kekelidze (ru), who heads the Serbsky Center and is the chief psychiatrist of the Ministry of Health and Social Development of the Russian Federation, confirmed that Kosenko was diagnosed with sluggish schizophrenia.

According to the commentary by the Independent Psychiatric Association of Russia on the 2007 text by Vladimir Rotstein, a doctrinist of Snezhnevsky's school, there are sufficient patients with delusion of reformism in psychiatric inpatient facilities for involuntary treatment. In 2012, delusion of reformism was mentioned as a symptom of mental disorder in Psychiatry: National Manual. In the same year, Vladimir Pashkovsky in his paper reported that he diagnosed 4.7 percent of 300 patients with delusion of reform. As Russian sociologist Alexander Tarasov wrote, "you will be treated in a hospital so that you and all your acquaintances get to learn forever that only such people as Anatoly Chubais or German Gref can be occupied with reforming in our country." According to Raimonds Krumgolds, a former member of the political party The Other Russia, he was examined because of his "delusion of reformism", which gave rise to an assumption of slow progressive schizophrenia. In 2012, Tyuvina and Balabanova in their joint paper reported that they used sulpiride to treat slow progressive schizophrenia.

== See also ==
- Drapetomania
- Excited delirium
- Female hysteria
- Gaslighting
- The Protest Psychosis: How Schizophrenia Became a Black Disease
- Oppositional defiant disorder
- Sluggish cognitive tempo
- Trump derangement syndrome

== Sources ==
- "The ICD-10 Classification of Mental and Behavioural Disorders. F21 Schizotypal Disorder".
- "МКБ-10: Классификация психических и поведенческих расстройств. F21 Шизотипическое расстройство" [The ICD-10 Classification of Mental and Behavioural Disorders. F21 Schizotypal Disorder] (in Russian). Archived from the original on 2016-04-22.
- "Проблема социальной опасности психически больных" [The problem of the social danger of the mentally ill]. Nezavisimiy Psikhiatricheskiy Zhurnal [The Independent Psychiatric Journal] (in Russian) (4): 12–17. 2007.
- "Цитатник номера" [Quote set of the issue]. Вестник Ассоциации психиатров Украины [The Herald of the Ukrainian Psychiatric Association] (in Russian) (5). The Ukrainian Psychiatric Association. 2013.
- "Russian Protester Committed to Psychiatric Hospital Over Riot". RIA Novosti. 8 October 2013.
- Bleikher, Vadim [Вадим Блейхер] (1984). Эпонимические термины в психиатрии, психотерапии и медицинской психологии. Словарь [Dictionary of eponymous terms in psychiatry, psychotherapy and medical psychology] (in Russian). Kiev: Головное издательство Издательского объединения «Вища школа» [Headquarters publishers of Publishing Association "Higher school"].
- Bloch, Sidney; Reddaway, Peter (1985). Soviet psychiatric abuse: The shadow over world psychiatry. Westview Press. p. 40. ISBN 0-8133-0209-9.
- Breggin, Peter (1993). "Psychiatry's role in the holocaust" (PDF). International Journal of Risk & Safety in Medicine. 4 (2): 133–148. doi:10.3233/JRS-1993-4204. PMID 23511221. Archived from the original on September 6, 2013.
- Danilin, Alexander [Александр Данилин] (28 March 2008). "Тупик" [Deadlock]. Russkaya Zhizn (in Russian).
- Davidoff, Victor (13 October 2013). "Soviet Psychiatry Returns". The Moscow Times.
- Dmitrieva, Tatyana [Татьяна Дмитриева]; Krasnov, Valery [Валерий Краснов]; Neznanov, Nikolai [Николай Незнанов]; Semke, Valentin [Валентин Семке]; Tiganov, Alexander [Александр Тиганов], eds. (2012). Психиатрия: Национальное руководство [Psychiatry: National manual] (in Russian). Moscow: ГЭОТАР-Медиа [GEOTAR-Media]. p. 322. ISBN 978-5970420300.
- Engmann, Birk (2021). "On the origins of the concept of 'latent schizophrenia' in Russian psychiatry". History of psychiatry. 2 (33): 230–235. doi:10.1177/0957154X211035328. PMID 34320852.
- Fainberg, Victor (1975). "My five years in mental hospitals". Index on Censorship. 4 (2): 67–71. doi:10.1080/03064227508532427.
- Fedenko, Pavel [Павел Феденко] (9 October 2009). "Был бы человек, а диагноз найдется" [A diagnosis is quickly found to attribute a person with] (in Russian). The BBC Russian Service.
- Gershman, Carl (July–August 1984). "Psychiatric abuse in the Soviet Union". Society. 21 (5): 54–59. doi:10.1007/BF02695434. PMID 11615169.
- Gluzman, Semyon [Семён Глузман] (2013a). "История психиатрических репрессий" [The history of psychiatric repression]. Вестник Ассоциации психиатров Украины [The Herald of the Ukrainian Psychiatric Association] (in Russian) (2). The Ukrainian Psychiatric Association.
- Gluzman, Semyon [Семён Глузман] (2013b). "Снежневский" [Snezhnevsky]. Вестник Ассоциации психиатров Украины [The Herald of the Ukrainian Psychiatric Association] (in Russian) (6). The Ukrainian Psychiatric Association: 79–80.
- Gluzman, Semyon [Семён Глузман] (2012). "Snezhnevsky, Andrei [Андрей Снежневский]. Письмо Виктору Некрасову от 12 ноября 1971" [The letter to Viktor Nekrasov of 12 November 1971]. Рисунки по памяти, или воспоминания отсидента [Pictures drawn from memory, or the released dissident's memories] (in Russian). Kiev: Издательский дом Дмитрия Бураго [Dmitry Burago's publishing house]. pp. 284–289. ISBN 978-966-489-121-6.
- Gluzman, Semyon [Семён Глузман] (2009). "Украинское лицо судебной психиатрии" [The Ukrainian face of forensic psychiatry]. Новости медицины и фармации [Medicine and Pharmacy News] (in Russian). 15 (289). Издательский дом «Заславский» ["Zaslavsky" Publishing House].
- Gosden, Richard (2001). Punishing the Patient: How Psychiatrists Misunderstand and Mistreat Schizophrenia. Melbourne: Scribe Publications. ISBN 0-908011-52-0.
- Healey, Dan (June 2011). "Book Review: Robert van Voren, Cold War in Psychiatry". History of Psychiatry. 22 (2): 246–247. doi:10.1177/0957154X110220020802.
- Jargin, Sergei (2011). "Some aspects of psychiatry in Russia". International Journal of Culture and Mental Health. 4 (2): 116–120. doi:10.1080/17542863.2010.519485.
- Katona, Cornelius; Robertson, Mary (2005). Psychiatry at a glance. Wiley-Blackwell. p. 77. ISBN 1-4051-2404-0.
- Kekelidze, Zurab [Зураб Кекелидзе] (22 October 2013). "Кому выгоден миф о карательной психиатрии? (Пресс-конференция проф. З.И. Кекелидзе в связи с направлением на принудительное лечение оппозиционера Михаила Косенко)" [For whom is the myth of punitive psychiatry profitable? (Press conference of prof. Z.I. Kekelidze in connection with sending oppositionist Mikhail Kosenko to compulsory treatment] (in Russian). Independent Psychiatric Association of Russia.
- Korolenko, Caesar; Dmitrieva, Nina [Цезарь Короленко, Нина Дмитриева] (2000). Социодинамическая психиатрия [Sociodynamic psychiatry] (in Russian). Moscow: Академический проект [Academic project]. ISBN 5829100150.
- Korolenko, Caesar; Kensin, Dennis (2002). "Reflections on the past and present state of Russian psychiatry". Anthropology & Medicine. 9 (1): 51–64. doi:10.1080/13648470220130017. PMID 26953493.
- Korotenko, Ada; Alikina, Natalia [Ада Коротенко, Наталия Аликина] (2002). Советская психиатрия: Заблуждения и умысел [Soviet psychiatry: fallacies and wilfulness] (in Russian). Kiev: Издательство «Сфера» [Publishing house "Sphere"]. ISBN 966-7841-36-7.
- Krumgold, Raimond [Раймонд Крумголд] (2012). "Экспертиза" [Examination]. In Prilepin, Zakhar [Захар Прилепин] (ed.). Лимонка в тюрьму [Limonka to a prison] (in Russian). Moscow: Центрполиграф [Centerpoligraf]. ISBN 978-5-227-03569-1.
- Lavretsky, Helen (1998). "The Russian Concept of Schizophrenia: A Review of the Literature" (PDF). Schizophrenia Bulletin. 24 (4): 537–557. doi:10.1093/oxfordjournals.schbul.a033348. PMID 9853788. Archived from the original (PDF) on 29 July 2014.
- Merskey, Harold (15 October 1988). "IPPNW: Forum for Soviet Anti-American propaganda?". Canadian Medical Association Journal. 139 (8): 699–700. PMC 1268271.
- Merskey, Harold; Shafran, Bronislava (March 1986). "Political hazards in the diagnosis of 'sluggish schizophrenia'". The British Journal of Psychiatry. 148 (3): 247–256. doi:10.1192/bjp.148.3.247. PMID 3719218.
- Moran, Mark (5 November 2010). "Psychiatric Abuses Once Led to Cold War Confrontation". Psychiatric News. 45 (21). The American Psychiatric Association: 6–7. doi:10.1176/pn.45.21.psychnews_45_21_009.
- Moseley, Ray (13 July 1989). "U.S. Group Blasts Soviet Mental Wards". Chicago Tribune.
- Nuller, Yuri [Юрий Нуллер] (2008). Структура психических расстройств [The Structure of Mental Disorders] (PDF) (in Russian). Kyiv: Сфера. pp. 17–18. ISBN 978-966-8782-44-2. See also: Nuller, Yuri [Юрий Нуллер] (1991). "О парадигме в психиатрии" [On paradigm in psychiatry]. The Bekhterev Review of Psychiatry and Medical Psychology (4). Институт им. В.М. Бехтерева.
- Ougrin, Dennis; Gluzman, Semyon; Dratcu, Luiz (30 November 2006). "Psychiatry in post-communist Ukraine: dismantling the past, paving the way for the future". Psychiatric Bulletin. 30 (12): 456–459. doi:10.1192/pb.30.12.456.
- Park, Young Su; Park, Sang Min; Jun, Jin Yong; Kim, Seog Ju (October 2014). "Psychiatry in Former Socialist Countries: Implications for North Korean Psychiatry" (PDF). Psychiatry Investigation. 11 (4): 363–370. doi:10.4306/pi.2014.11.4.363. PMC 4225199. PMID 25395966. Archived from the original (PDF) on 2017-01-30.
- Pashkovsky, Vladimir [Владимир Пашковский] (2012). "О клиническом значении религиозно-архаического бредового комплекса" [The clinical meaning of religious-archaic delusions]. Социальная и клиническая психиатрия [Social and Clinical Psychiatry] (in Russian). 22 (2): 43–48.
- Pavlova, Svetlana; Polyakovskaya, Elena [Светлана Павлова, Елена Поляковская] (28 November 2012). "Дело Косенко: лечение и возмещение" [The case of Kosenko: treatment and compensation]. Радио Свобода (in Russian). Radio Liberty.
- Plante, Thomas (2013). Abnormal Psychology across the Ages. ABC-CLIO. p. 110. ISBN 978-0313398377.
- Popov, Yuri (1992). "Diagnosis of a "Severe Personality Disorder" as a Cause of Criminal Inresponsibility: V.K. Bukovsky". In Popov, Yuri (ed.). The Bekhterev Review of Psychiatry and Medical Psychology. Washington, DC: American Psychiatric Press. pp. 69–73. ISBN 978-0-88048-667-5.
- Reich, Walter (30 January 1983). "The world of Soviet psychiatry". The New York Times.
- Robertson, Michael; Walter, Garry (2013). Ethics and Mental Health: The Patient, Profession and Community. CRC Press. p. 84. ISBN 978-1444168648.
- Safina, Nailya [Наиля Сафина] (23 December 2011). "Нет здоровья без душевного здоровья" [There is no health without mental health]. Meditsinskaya Gazeta (in Russian). Archived from the original on December 5, 2013.
- Savenko, Yuri [Юрий Савенко] (2010). "Латентные формы антипсихиатрии как главная опасность" [Latent forms of anti-psychiatry as a major threat]. Nezavisimiy Psikhiatricheskiy Zhurnal [The Independent Psychiatric Journal] (in Russian) (4): 13–17. ISSN 1028-8554.
- Savenko, Yuri [Юрий Савенко] (2008). "Навстречу МКБ-11" [Toward the ICD-11]. Nezavisimiy Psikhiatricheskiy Zhurnal [The Independent Psychiatric Journal] (3).
- Sfera, Adonis (9 September 2013). "Can psychiatry be misused again?". Frontiers in Psychiatry. 4 (4): 101. doi:10.3389/fpsyt.2013.00101. PMC 3766833. PMID 24058348.
- Smulevich, Anatoly (1989). "Sluggish schizophrenia in the modern classification of mental illness". Schizophrenia Bulletin. 15 (4): 533–539. doi:10.1093/schbul/15.4.533. PMID 2696084.
- Smulevich, Anatoly [Анатолий Смулевич] (2009). "Глава 1. Клиническое сходство малопрогредиентной шизофрении и пограничных состояний" [Chapter 1. Clinical similarity between continuous sluggish schizophrenia and borderline conditions]. Малопрогредиентная шизофрения и пограничные состояния [Continuous sluggish schizophrenia and borderline conditions] (in Russian). Moscow: МЕДпресс-информ [MEDpress-inform]. ISBN 978-5983224896.
- Smulevich, Anatoly; Morozov, Pyotr [Анатолий Смулевич, Пётр Морозов] (2014). "Психиатрию нельзя выдумать из головы или из учебников" [Psychiatry cannot be invented in mind or textbooks] (PDF). Дневник психиатра [The Psychiatrist's Diary] (in Russian). No. 1. pp. 1–4. Archived (PDF) from the original on 28 April 2014.
- Snezhnevsky, Andrei [Андрей Снежневский] (2014). "Письмо Виктору Некрасову от 12 ноября 1971" [The letter to Viktor Nekrasov of 12 November 1971] (PDF). Дневник психиатра [The Psychiatrist's Diary] (in Russian). No. 1. pp. 12–13.
- Stone, Alan (1985). Law, Psychiatry, and Morality: Essays and Analysis. American Psychiatric Pub. p. 8. ISBN 0-88048-209-5.
- Stone, Alan (2002). "Psychiatrists on the side of the angels: the Falun Gong and Soviet Jewry" (PDF). The Journal of the American Academy of Psychiatry and the Law. 30 (1): 107–111. PMID 11931357. Archived from the original (PDF) on 2011-09-28.
- Styazhkin, Viktor (1992). "Diagnosis of a Paranoiac (Delusional) Personality Development in the Forensic Psychiatric Expert Examination". In Popov, Yuri (ed.). The Bekhterev Review of Psychiatry and Medical Psychology. Washington, DC: American Psychiatric Press. pp. 65–68. ISBN 978-0-88048-667-5.
- Tarasov, Alexander [Александр Тарасов] (2006). "Психиатрия: контроль над сознанием или тем, что от него осталось" [Psychiatry: the control over consciousness or what is left of it]. Альманах "Неволя" ["Bondage" Almanac] (in Russian) (9): 154–159. Archived from the original on 7 February 2009.
- Targum, Steven; Chaban, Oleh; Mykhnyak, Serhiy (April 2013). "Psychiatry in the Ukraine". Innovations in Clinical Neuroscience. 10 (4): 41–46. PMC 3659038. PMID 23696959.
- Tiganov, Alexandr [Александр Тиганов] (1999). Tiganov, Alexandr [Александр Тиганов] (ed.). Руководство по психиатрии [A manual on psychiatry] (in Russian). Vol. 1. Moscow: Медицина [Medicine]. ISBN 5-225-02676-1.
- Tobin, John (June 2013). "Editorial: political abuse of psychiatry in authoritarian systems". Irish Journal of Psychological Medicine. 30 (2). College of Psychiatrists of Ireland: 97–102. doi:10.1017/ipm.2013.23. PMID 30199973.
- Tyuvina, N.; Balabanova, V. [Н. Тювина, В. Балабанова] (2012). "Патокинез эндогенных депрессивно-ипохондрических нарушений непсихотического регистра на фоне терапии сульпиридом" [Pathokinesis of endogenous depressive-hypochondriacal disorders of a non-psychotic register in therapy by sulpiride] (PDF). Современная терапия психических расстройств [Modern therapy of mental disorders] (in Russian) (4): 22–26. Archived from the original (PDF) on 2013-07-12.
- Vasilenko, N.Y. [Н.Ю. Василенко] (2004). Основы социальной медицины [Fundamentals of social medicine] (in Russian). Vladivostok: Издательство Дальневосточного университета [Publishing house of Far Eastern Federal University].
- Voren, Robert van (2010a). "Abuse of psychiatry for political purposes in the USSR: a case-study and personal account of the efforts to bring them to an end". In Helmchen, Hanfried; Sartorius, Norman (eds.). Ethics in psychiatry: European contributions. International library of ethics, law, and the new medicine. Vol. 45. Vol. 45. Springer Netherlands. pp. 489–507. doi:10.1007/978-90-481-8721-8_29. ISBN 978-90-481-8720-1.
- Voren, Robert van (2010b). "Political Abuse of Psychiatry—An Historical Overview". Schizophrenia Bulletin. 36 (1): 33–35. doi:10.1093/schbul/sbp119. PMC 2800147. PMID 19892821.
- Voren, Robert van [Роберт ван Ворен] (2013). "От политических злоупотреблений психиатрией к реформе психиатрической службы" [From political abuses of psychiatry to the reform of psychiatric service]. Вестник Ассоциации психиатров Украины [The Herald of the Ukrainian Psychiatric Association] (in Russian) (2). The Ukrainian Psychiatric Association.
- Wilkinson, Greg (13 September 1986). "Political dissent and "sluggish" schizophrenia in the Soviet Union". British Medical Journal. 293 (6548): 641–642. doi:10.1136/bmj.293.6548.641. PMC 1341504. PMID 3092963.
- Zajicek, Benjamin (2018). "Soviet psychiatry and the origins of the sluggish schizophrenia concept, 1912-1936". History of the Human Sciences. 31 (2): 88–105. doi:10.1177/0952695117746057.
- Zharikov, Nikolai; Tyulpin, Yuri [Николай Жариков, Юрий Тюльпин] (2000). Психиатрия: Учебник [Psychiatry: a textbook] (in Russian). Moscow: Медицина [Medicine]. ISBN 5-225-04189-2.
