= Andriy Slyusarchuk =

Ukrainian mnemonist (born 1971)

Andriy Tykhonovych Slyusarchuk
- Андрій Тихонович Слюсарчук
- Born: May 10, 1971 (age 55); Zhytomyr, Ukraine
- Citizenship: Soviet Union (1971–1991); Ukraine (1991–present)
- Education: School for intellectually-disabled infant orphans in Hryshkivtsi (Berdychiv Raion of Zhytomyr Oblast); Higher Vocational School of Railway Transport in Kozyatyn (Vinnytsia Oblast); Specialized Vocational School 62 in Chervonohrad (Lviv Oblast)
- Employers: V. Chornovol Lviv State Institute of Modern Technology and Management; Kyiv National University of Construction and Architecture; Lviv Polytechnic, P.L. Shupyk National Medical Academy of Postgraduate Education; A.P. Romodanov Institute of Neurosurgery, Government of Ukraine
- Known for: Establishing the National Institute of the Brain; Mnemonic ability; Illegal medical activity (including brain surgery) in hospitals
- Criminal charges: Forgery, illegal medical activity, murder, fraud
- Criminal penalty: 8 years in prison
- Criminal status: Released
- Awards: 2011 Ukraine State Prize for scientific achievement in education
- Website: World Neuro Center in Kharkiv

Andriy Tykhonovych Slyusarchuk (Ukrainian: Андрі́й Ти́хонович Слюсарчу́к, born 10 May 1971) is a Ukrainian mnemonist who has claimed to be a general aviation pilot, psychotherapist, Doctor of Science in medicine, psychiatrist, psychologist and neurosurgeon. He has performed brain surgery throughout Ukraine in state and municipal hospitals. Slyusarchuk has been employed by the V. Chornovol Lviv State Institute of Modern Technology and Management, the Kyiv National University of Construction and Architecture, the P.L. Shupyk National Medical Academy of Postgraduate Education, and the A. P. Romodanov Institute of Neurosurgery. He has lectured at the Lviv Polytechnic, and worked for the government of Ukraine as an adviser to Oleksandr Turchynov.

Slyusarchuk claimed to have set several world records in mnemonics by memorizing data and figures (such as pi) and performing complex calculations in his mind. Because of this, he came to be known as "Doctor Pi".

Slyusarchuk defrauded two Ukrainian presidents: Viktor Yushchenko and Viktor Yanukovych. The Verkhovna Rada (the Ukrainian Parliament) referred to his activities as "the largest-scale fraud in Ukraine's 20 years of independence". On 14 February 2014, the Sykhiv Raion Court sentenced Slyusarchuk to eight years in prison.

== Education and career ==
Slyusarchuk's education began in an institutional school for intellectually-disabled infant orphans in the village of Hryshkivtsi (Berdychiv Raion of Zhytomyr Oblast). He was diagnosed with schizophrenia, oligophrenia, cerebral palsy, hepatitis and nephropathy. Slyusarchuk claimed he obtained a Doctor of Science degree, which allowed him to go into medical practice, performing neurosurgery, appearing on radio and television, granting interviews and publicly demonstrating his mnemonic skills. He met a Ukrainian president who authorized him to establish the National Institute of Brain, attended private clubs and meetings of Ukrainian nomenklatura, befriended ministers and received a State Prize. Slyusarchuk forged documents, cheated the public at chess matches and memory demonstrations and practiced medicine without a license. He was interviewed by major newspapers, including Trud:

As a teacher, as a psychiatrist, I can say pleno jure (with full right): today it is mostly the dependent children who attend universities in this country. All is about money, there is no natural scientific selection. Previously, in the 1980s and 90s, you had to withstand intellectual contest. Today there is no necessity for it. Now a lot of mediocrities grind away at their studies. But with mother's and father's money, they manage to buy not only diplomas but also positions.

== Biography ==
The details of Andriy Slyusarchuk's life were uncovered through investigative journalism. Slyusarchuk was born in Zhytomyr, Ukraine on 10 May 1971. His 21-year-old mother, Natalia Tykhonovna Slyusarchuk of Zhytomyr, left her newborn son at a maternity home. She did not know the name of the father of her child, and Slyusarchuk's middle name was recorded on his birth certificate as "Tykhonovych" (the masculine version of Natalia Slyusarchuk's patronymic).

He was hospitalized at the Zhytomyr psychiatric hospital eight times between 1974 and 1987. From 1980 to 1987 (second to eighth grade) Slyusarchuk lived and studied at an institutional school for young orphans in the town of Hryshkivtsi in Berdychiv Raion, receiving a certificate for the completion of his education there. Nearly all the documents pertaining to his education at the school were later destroyed; his birth date became 19 May 1974 on some documents, yielding negative results for official inquiries about his time at the school.

From 1987 to 1989, Slyusarchuk studied in the 208th group at the inter-regional Higher Vocational School of Railway Transport in Kozyatyn, Vinnytsia Oblast, to become a plasterer-tiler-facing worker. On 2 October 1989, according to order No. 31, he was transferred to the Specialized Vocational School No. 62 in Chervonohrad, Lviv Oblast. According to teachers there, Slyusarchuk walked with a briefcase and a stethoscope like a doctor and conducted hypnosis sessions at a nearby school to earn money. On 1 June 1990, he received a certificate for the completion of his course; although his occupation was listed as "assistant foreman”, he was not appointed to a job. In 1993, Slyusarchuk was turned down for a position as a neurosurgeon at the hospital in Novoyavorivsk (Lviv Oblast), but later practiced medicine elsewhere.

On 27 July 1996, the first criminal complaint was filed against Slyusarchuk. The Zhydachiv Raion police in Lviv Oblast accused him of fraud, investigating the case for eight years. According to the complaint, Slyusarchuk diagnosed a woman with a terminal illness, promised to cure her with expensive drugs, stole $665 from her and disappeared; it indicated that he had a diploma from the M. I. Pirogov Vinnytsia Medical Institute.

In 1999, Slyusarchuk taught at the Departments of Engineering and Pedagogical Training at Lviv Polytechnic for about six months. According to his colleagues, Slyusarchuk lectured on the psychology of managing people. His lectures were popular, with students cutting classes to listen to him, and were also attended by other teachers.

On 17 July 2000, a second criminal complaint was brought against Slyusarchuk in Lviv. According to complainants Oleg and Bogdana Gamalii, they paid him $1,500 to treat their two young children; the children's health worsened following his treatment. After five years, the complaint was dropped.

Between 2003 and 2006 Slyusarchuk lived in a Lviv Polytechnic National University dormitory where he fraudulently diagnosed students and "treated" them with psychotropic drugs. He extorted large amounts of money from parents for treatment, telling them that their children would commit suicide without it, and distributed unapproved drugs for $4,000 per ampoule.

On 28 February 2006, Slyusarchuk claimed to have set a record by memorizing the numbers which make up pi. Journalists from Ekspres and Moskovskij Komsomolets noted that at his public performances, he was attended by a nearby assistant with a computer (and, perhaps, a small earphone). In March 2006, Slyusarchuk began work as an associate professor at the Chornovil Lviv State Institute of Modern Technology and Management and became a professor in the general-law department that year. At the end of October 2008 the media reported that he had applied for emigration to Canada, where he wanted undertake studies "impossible to undertake in Ukraine."

From June 2008 to February 2010, Slyusarchuk was a professor of neurosurgery at the P.L. Shupyk National Medical Academy of Postgraduate Education. According to department head Mykola Polishchuk, when Slyusarchuk read several pages from a medical book given to him by Polishchuk and recited them from memory he was hired. Slyusarchuk lectured on the subject of memory, and Polishchuk said that colleagues had found Slyusarchuk's 2002 dissertation on the Internet. Polishchuk later found a 2000 dissertation by Nikolai Ershov in the Russian State Library in Moscow; the only difference between Ershov's and Slyusarchuk's dissertations was in the title. After Polishchuk's report to the rector, a dismissal order for Slyusarchuk was issued. When the academic administration requested verification from the Higher Attestation Commission of the Ministry of Education of Russia for Slyusarchuk's credentials, it was told that there was no record of him as a professor or a Doctor of Science. He was a professor in the Department of Information Systems and Networks at Lviv Polytechnic from September 2009 to June 2011.

From 9 December 2009 to 11 March 2010, Slyusarchuk was an adviser to Oleksandr Turchynov in the Ukrainian Cabinet of Ministers. He co-hosted the program Mind Games on Radio Era from 2009 to 2011.

On 22 December 2009, Slyusarchuk discussed an Institute of the Brain with Ukrainian President Viktor Yushchenko; Yushchenko issued a decree establishing it that same day. On 26 December, the Mirror Weekly published an interview with Slyusarchuk where he claimed that he had been offered the position of head of the institute and hoped to implement his plans. He said in another interview that the institute's annual budget would be ₴500 million.

In 2010 the Ministry of Education and Science of Ukraine, headed by Dmytro Tabachnyk, reportedly gave Slyusarchuk a document appointing him a professor at the department of neurosurgery of the A. P. Romodanov Institute of Neurosurgery. The Higher Attestation Commission of Ukraine refused to recognize the professorship, nullifying a professorship allegedly given to him in Russia; later the Russian professorship was proved to be fraudulent. In 2010 Slyusarchuk practiced disaster medicine, performed surgery throughout Ukraine and conducted behavioral experiments on rats in his one-room apartment with his assistant Chervoniy, using a neuromagnetic stimulator and other devices. A newspaper article about the devices called them part of a prototypical psychotropic weapon.

On 25 May 2011, Dmytro Pavlychko, Levko Lukyanenko, Yuri Palchukovsky and Volodymyr Pylypchuk appealed to President Viktor Yanukovych to establish the Institute of the Brain and to invite Slyusarchuk to head it because he was threatening to leave Ukraine for intellectual reasons. According to Slyusarchuk, the institute's primary aim would be "to engage specialists, to be active — [to] have the possibility to be a scientist". Anatoly Kashpirovsky, whom Slysarchuk called "my idol in the profession", also lobbied for the institute's establishment.

On 9 June 2011 he was first criticized in the press, by the weekly 2000. On 30 September 2011, Slysarchuk received the 2011 State Prize of Ukraine for "scientific achievements in the field of education": for the series of works The Complex of Educational Information Technologies for Presenting, Memorizing and Processing Superlarge Information Objects in the Learning Process.

The Lviv newspaper Ekspres published the first of a series of articles criticizing him, "The Sensational Exposure of Pseudo-professor Pi", on 6 October 2011. It was followed by "The First Victims of Pseudo-professor Pi", "Pseudo-doctor Slyusarchuk Kills People", "The Cheap Tricks of Professor Pi", "The New Victims of the Pseudo-Doctor", "Pseudo-doctor Slyusarchuk is in a Trap", "Pseudo-doctor Slyusarchuk Buried His Mother Alive", "The Pseudo-Doctor Sows New Deaths", "It is Just a Shock. The Pseudo-doctor Kills the Child of a Priest", "The Pi Record is Cancelled", "The Pi Record is Falsified," "The Secret Protectors of Doctor Pi", "The Pseudo-Doctor Again Picked Up a Scalpel", "The Perverts of Minister Tabachnyk", "The Pseudo-Doctor, Sex and Drugs", "The Grave Sin of Minister Tabachnyk", "Three More New Victims of the Pseudo-Doctor" (a video), "The New Attitude of Doctor Pi", "The Intelligentsia of the Lviv Oblast Demand that Tabachnyk, Who is an Accessory of Doctor Pi, Be Relieved of His Position", "The Computer Operator of Doctor Pi Speaks Out", "New Actions Brought Against the Pseudo-Doctor", "A New Death in the Case of Doctor Pi", "The Millions of Doctor Pi Against Ekspres", "The Inquest Breaks the Action Brought Against Doctor Pi", "Doctor Pi is Ignorant of Even Arithmetic", "Doctor Pi Took Up to Tens of Thousands". After the Ekspres articles were published, criminal complaints were again brought against Slyusarchuk.

On 14 November 2011 he was charged with fraud by the Berkut, and on 21 November he was informed that his records memorizing pi were canceled and removed from The Book of Records of Ukraine. Between 2 February and 1 March 2012, Slyusarchuk underwent a medical and psychiatric examination at the Lviv Oblast Psychiatric Hospital. The examination found him partially sane, authorizing a psychiatrist to supervise and treat him in a prison if and when needed. Between 2 July and fall 2012, Slyusarchuk received a second psychiatric examination at the Pavlov Psychiatric Hospital in Kyiv. On 14 February 2014 the Sykhiv Raion Court sentenced him to eight years in prison, with the judge reading the 150-page sentence based on the 26-volume criminal-case transcript.

=== Biography based on Slyusarchuk's own interviews ===
According to a birth certificate shown by him to journalists, Slyusarchuk was born in the village of Tuğ in the Hadrut Rayon of the Nagorno-Karabakh Autonomous Oblast of the Azerbaijan Soviet Socialist Republic. His father was Mushegyan Vartan Aramovich, an ethnic Armenian. His mother, a Ukrainian, was Ruslana Tykhonovna Slyusarchuk. The Hadrut Rayon civil registry reportedly changed his birth details to his mother's by request in 1984, and he became Andriy Tykhonovych Slyusarchuk.

Slyusarchuk said that he graduated from a secondary school in Vinnytsia at the age of nine. His parents, medical professionals (his mother a pediatrician and his father a cardiac surgeon), died in a car accident the year he graduated from secondary school.

During the 1980s he was subjected to punitive psychiatry, physically abused and sent to a psychiatric hospital where he was tied to a bed, given psychoactive drugs and injected with sulfozin. When the psychiatrists asked him which books he was reading, Slyusarchuk said that he was reading medical literature and works by Ivan Pavlov and Vladimir Lenin. He was sent to an institution for the mentally-ill children.

Slyusarchuk was placed in a Soviet orphanage where he was misunderstood by his teachers and encouraged to conform. When he tried to retrieve his secondary-school certification to enter a higher educational institution, he was labeled mentally ill and punished. At age 11, Slyusarchuk ran away from the orphanage.

He taught himself by reading the book Your Abilities, Man, which was given to him by Soviet psychiatrist Andrei Snezhnevsky (who examined him when he was a child). When Slyusarchuk arrived in Moscow he found a Gypsy camp, where he was accepted, fed and taught to beg for money. At the time, he felt the environment was what he needed; he learned about Gypsy hypnotism and its use.

After living with the Gypsies for about a year, Slyusarchuk met an employee of the Russian National Research Medical University. They became friends, and through him Slyusarchuk received an appointment with Soviet Minister of Health Yevgeniy Chazov.

With Chazov's help, at age 12 Slyusarchuk was admitted for studies at the general-therapy department of the Russian State Medical University. He specialized in neurosurgery under Professor E. I. Gusev (Гусев Е.И.), and his teachers included neurologists V. A. Karlov (Карлов В. А.), A. N. Konovalov and A. M. Vein (Вейн А.М.). Slyusarchuk claimed to have graduated from the Russian National Research Medical University with an honorable diploma at 18, beginning a postgraduate course without the usual internship.

His partial self-reported timeline was:

- 1985 — Entered the 2nd Moscow State Medical University, named after Nikolay Pirogov and now known as the Russian National Research Medical University.
- 1992 — Entered the St Petersburg University medical psychology faculty.
- 1998 — Defended his Candidate of Sciences dissertation.
- 2003 — Defended his Doctor of Sciences dissertation.
- 2006 — Claimed a world record for memorizing 5,100 digits in 117 seconds, not accepted by international organizations.

In June 2009, after claiming a world record for memorizing pi by being able to recite randomly selected sequences from the first 30 million places of pi, Slyusarchuk was congratulated by Ukrainian President Viktor Yuschenko and funding for a research center for the development of Slyusarchuk's methodology was discussed. A December 22 press release from the President of Ukraine reported that Yushchenko and Slyusarchuk had discussed an Institute of Brain Studies to prevent and treat neurological disorders, focusing on social problems such as drug and alcohol abuse. Yushchenko issued a decree providing for the Institute of Brain Studies, for research in neurology, psychiatry, psychology and neurorehabilitation, to be established within one month.

Slyusarchuk claimed that his memorization skills were based on mental associations between figures, images, words, numbers (mnemonics) and a photographic memory of everything on which he concentrates. According to the scientists verifying Slyusarchuk's records, "The mnemonic technique can be used by any person". A February 2010 article in the newspaper Novaya reported that Slyusarchuk's student, Alexander Chervonyi, claimed that he could reproduce many of his teacher's memory performances including the recitation of randomly-selected sequences from the first five million decimal places of pi.

Slyusarchuk became interested in chess. In April 2011, he defeated the chess program Rybka in an exhibition match in Kyiv while blindfolded. On 26 May, Slyusarchuk said that he memorized 2,600 books on chess in preparation for the game with Rybka. The Trinidad and Tobago Guardian newspaper published an account of Slyusarchuk's victory over Rybka as "Oh, the wonders of gullibility", quoting the Internet-based chess newspaper Chess Today: "What can help [to prove that it was a mystification] are Slyusarchuk’s numerous absurd statements which show his complete ignorance of chess—quite unforgivable for a guy who has read, as is claimed, more than 2000 chess books within several months!"

According to Slyusarchuk's friend, journalist Igor Yurchenko, no one argued that Slyusarchuk played chess better than a world champion or a grandmaster; at the time, Slyusarchuk stressed that it was not a chess event but a demonstration of memory. Sponsors bought Slyusarchuk a heavy-duty computer which played many games daily with another comparable computer, and he memorized the strategy of these games. Memorizing thousands of chess games reportedly helped him defeat the Rybka-4; according to Yurchenko, Slyusarchuk just recalled memorized games.

== Mnemonics and hypnosis ==
Slyusarchuk claimed to have set records for memorizing large amounts of digital data, sequences of geometric figures, words and other information, including one million digits of the figure pi. By 2008, he claimed to have memorized two million decimal places of pi and about 7,000 volumes of text; by the following year, his claim had increased to 15,000 volumes.

By June 2009 Slyusarchuk claimed to have set a record by memorizing the first 30 million decimal places of pi, which were printed in 20 volumes of text. He claimed to have memorized 200 million decimal places of pi by October 2010. None of the claimed pi records appear on the Pi World Ranking list.

Slyusarchuk was known for his hypnotic skill; he claimed the ability to hypnotize people to feel no pain when burned. On a TV show, he hypnotized students of the L'viv University of Modern Technology (Львівський державний інститут новітніх технологій та управління ім. В. Чорновола) into believing that the onions they ate were apples. Slyusarchuk demonstrated hypnosis of a salesman who accepted a ₴1 bill, thinking it was a ₴500 bill. His televised demonstration of chess-position memory (memorizing all pieces on 80 boards) was criticized by invited chess master Grigoriy Timoshenko, who said that he was 99.9-percent sure that the performance was fake, and a New York Times article called Slyusarchuk "an illusionist".

== Forgery and fraud ==
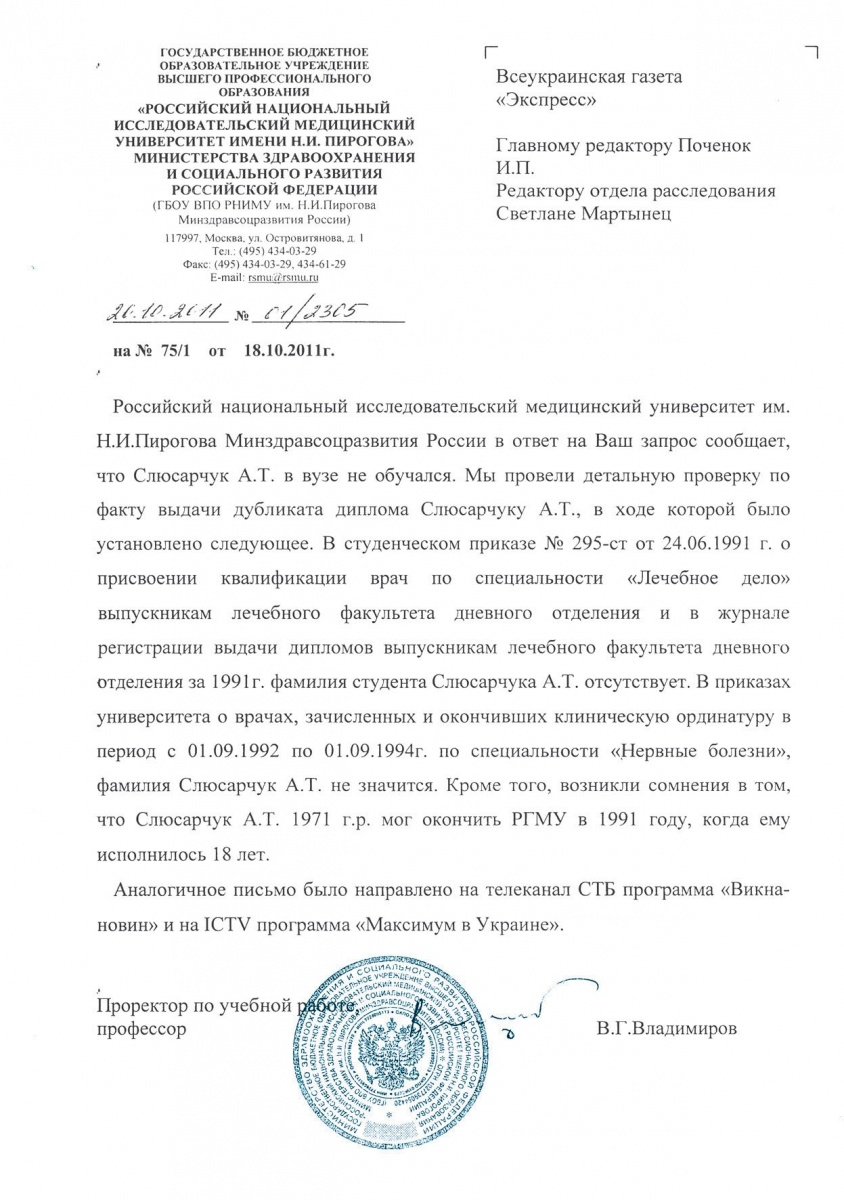
Letter from the Russian National Research Medical University published by Ekspres, stating that Slyusarchuk never graduated from the university

On 6 October 2011 the Lviv newspaper Ekspres published its first article critical of Slyusarchuk, "The Sensational Exposure of Pseudo-Professor Pi", accusing him of forgery and fraud and investigating him in subsequent articles. Three weeks later, the newspaper published a letter from the Russian National Research Medical University saying that Slyusarchuk had not studied at the university. On 10 January 2012 the newspaper released a video of brain surgery performed by Slyusarchuk, surrounded by assistants in an operating room; in the video, he wiped his scalpel with cotton wool before incising the patient's brain. On 14 March Ekspres published an interview with Andriy Novosad, who told reporters that he wrote a computer program which Slyusarchuk tested with radio equipment for the pi demonstrations and created articles which were published in Slyusarchuk's name.

After the Ekspres articles attracted widespread publicity Slyusarchuk denied the accusations in interviews for other media sources, saying that he had applied to the General Prosecutor of Ukraine to clarify the situation and disprove the Ekspres allegations. On 14 November 2011, the Ukrainian police detained him on suspicion of forgery and fraud.

During the investigation, senior officials of the Ministry of Education and Science, Youth and Sport of Ukraine (including department heads and the vice-minister) had told the press that Slyusarchuk's documents and scientific titles were valid according to Ukrainian law and protocol. Large portions of Slyusarchuk's scientific works were considered classified, with state secrets privilege in Ukraine and Russia. At Slyusarchuk's trial people who admired him and invited him to work for them testified that although they were aware that he was not a doctor, they did not report him; he continued to practice neurosurgery in hospitals.

From 2 February to 1 March 2012, Slyusarchuk underwent a psychiatric examination at Lviv Oblast Psychiatric Hospital. The examination found Slyusarchuk partially sane from a legal standpoint; he had a "mixed personality disorder with a predominance of dissocial, hysterical and narcissistic elements". According to Alexander Soroka, Slyusarchuk is mentally ill but responsible for his actions; if such a person is imprisoned, they would be supervised and treated by a psychiatrist as needed. The examination results were questioned by Ukrainian psychiatrist Semyon Gluzman: "If Doctor Pi begins to testify, a lot of compromising materials on the powerful of the world can appear. But in this way, it all can be attributed to his mental illness. I saw many performances of Slyusarchuk on television, listened to his speeches on radio and did not notice any signs of mental illness". According to Gluzman, none of his colleagues suspected that Slyusarchuk was mentally ill.

He received a second psychiatric examination at Pavlov Psychiatric Hospital in Kyiv from 2 July to the fall of 2012. Ministry of Internal Affairs public-affairs department head Volodymyr Polishchuk said, "Independent examination [was] conducted to check Slyusarchuk's mental health and his possible psychic and hypnotic abilities". Slyusarchuk's first attorneys had based their strategy on a finding of mental incompetence, a strategy with which he disagreed. In his final testimony at the trial Slyusarchuk said, "The logic of such 'expert opinions' is simple: to diminish the defendant's attempts to adduce evidence in his defense, to force court and public not to believe a word said by him, he is declared out of his mind. The true value of such 'examinations' is known because since the USSR punitive psychiatry has been a trusted servant of the NKVD and the KGB." According to investigators, he did not graduate from a university; his background consisted of an institutional school, a sewing vocational school in Chervonohrad and treatment at the Zhytomyr psychiatric hospital. With his forged credentials, he worked as a neurosurgeon and held senior positions for long periods.

According to a former agent of the USSR secret service who knew Slyusarchuk by sight, he was probably a product of a secret KGB pilot project. The agent was aware of a program in which orphans with unusual abilities were recruited throughout the Soviet Union; many died as a result of neurological experiments, but Slyusarchuk survived. He believes that Slyusarchuk participated in the secret pilot projects, receiving a professorship in return. His medical knowledge was derived from books and his memory was actually faulty; over time, he came to believe that he actually held the university diplomas. According to the agent, sealed documents about Slyusarchuk are stored in the KGB archives.

Slyusarchuk maintained that his case was fabricated by the Prosecutor General and the Security Service of Ukraine. In 2005, he reportedly accidentally damaged his original diploma from the Russian National Research Medical University; a month later he received a duplicate, and denied any forgery. In 2003 Slyusarchuk reportedly met with Russian Federal Security Service (FSB) agents, agreeing in writing not to disclose the results of his scientific works and advising the Ukrainian government. In 2011, he traveled to Moscow and asked the former FSB curator for help. When Slyusarchuk was told that the FSB would confirm his education and academic degrees if he cooperated with them, he refused.

Under questioning, the head of the university archives testified that Slyusarchuk showed her his damaged diploma in 2005 and his full name was legible. Verifying his surname in the registry, the woman submitted a request to the rector for approval. He did so, adding the instructions: "Carry out according to procedure"; the university neither proved nor disproved whether Slyusarchuk originally received a diploma from them.

At a 16 December 2011 press conference, Minister of Education and Science Dmytro Tabachnyk said that his ministry's Russian counterpart admitted that it had mistakenly issued Slyusarchuk a duplicate diploma. At the press conference, Slyusarchuk's diplomas (including a duplicate) were demonstrated to be scanned documents.

== Conviction and sentencing ==
In the Verkhovna Rada, Slyusarchuk's activities were called "the largest-scale fraud in the 20 years of Ukrainian independence". According to the Ukrainian Independent Information Agency, his defrauding of government agencies is unprecedented. In 2012, Ukrainsky Medychny Chasopys (Ukrainian Medical Journal) published the outcome of his case entitled, "Head doctors who let the person without medical training into operating room should be held criminally responsible." In the article, Ukrainian psychiatrist Semyon Gluzman expressed the opinion that Slyusarchuk skillfully took advantage of poor security; if he had chosen a lower-profile specialty, he might have succeeded. According to Gluzman, Ukraine has hundreds of people with the degree of Doctor of Sciences with expertise comparable to Slyusarchuk's. In the journal, Doctor of Science Olga Bogomolets wrote that the admission of a person without medical training to an operating room violated laws clearly regulating who can practice medicine, when and where; a hospital supervising physician who violates the law must be held accountable.

On 14 February 2014, the Sykhiv Raion Court sentenced Slyusarchuk to eight years in prison after finding him guilty of five counts of illegal medical activities and two counts of murder by negligence: a 52-year-old man named Lozovyi and three-year-old Danylo Prokopchuk of Ternopil Oblast. He was also found guilty of knowingly using forged documents and five counts of appropriating property by deception and breach of confidence (fraud). The court upheld victim claims, with Slyusarchuk fined about $40,000 (the amount of money paid for his services). He was also fined ₴70,000 to compensate Lozovyi's family and ₴30,000 for each of the other four victims. Slyusarchuk was fined a total of ₴500,000 in victim compensation and ₴44,000 in state fines. The court found that Slyusarchuk's diplomas from the Moscow and Vinnytsia medical universities were falsified.

In a five-bed prison cell furnished with a table, a washstand, a toilet, bookshelves, a TV and a radio, he reads books on medicine, the criminal code and the criminal-procedure code. In September 2014, Slyusarchuk dismissed his attorneys, telling them that for what he paid for their services he could have bought ten more diplomas. He distrusts defense attorneys, feeling that they do their job poorly, and hoped to appeal his conviction at the regular session of the Lviv Oblast Appeal Court scheduled for 1 October 2014.

== State award ==
On 30 September 2011, Ukrainian president Viktor Yanukovych issued Decree No 960/2011 awarding Slyusarchuk the 2011 State Prize of Ukraine for "scientific achievements in the field of education" for a series of works: "The complex of educational information technologies for presenting, memorizing and processing superlarge information objects in the learning process". Slyusarchuk's research involved the technology of inputting large amounts of information into electronic databases and its playback. Portions on which Slyusarchuk worked are stamped "secret". Slyusarchuk's portions were published in Russia and are secret. His research was nominated by the academic administration of Lviv Polytechnic for the State Prize, and the issue was debated in Kyiv by a commission of Ukrainian scientists.

As a State Prize laureate Slyusarchuk would have received ₴150,000; he did not, after his detention for fraud by the Berkut on 14 November 2011. The decree awarding the State Prize is unrevoked, describing his credentials as a professor of Information Systems and Networks at Lviv Polytechnic and a Doctor of Sciences in medicine.

== Documentaries ==
Documentaries and TV programs have been made about Slyusarchuk, including a 2008 BBC documentary. In 2009 the STB Channel broadcast the documentary, Pravyla Zhyttya: Povelyteli Svidomosti (The Rules of Life: The Rulers of Consciousness). In 2012 the HTH channel broadcast a documentary by Oleg Vasilevsky, Nezbagnenna Afera Doktora π (The Incredible Fraud of Doctor Pi). On 26 December 2012 the ТСН channel broadcast a documentary, Ukrainskiе Sensatsyi: Rascryli Vse Tainy "Doktora Pi" (Ukrainian Sensation: The Secrets of Doctor Pi).
