= Andrei Snezhnevsky =

Soviet psychiatrist (1904–1987)

- Born: Andrei Vladimirovich Snezhnevsky; 20 May [O.S. 7 May] 1904; Kostroma, Russian Empire
- Died: 12 July 1987 (aged 83); Moscow, Soviet Union
- Citizenship: Russian Empire; Soviet Union
- Education: Kazan Federal University
- Known for: His active participation in Pavlovian session, political abuse of psychiatry in the Soviet Union by developing and applying the diagnosis of sluggish schizophrenia to political dissidents; no less active participation in persistent counteractions to stop struggle against political abuse of psychiatry in the Soviet Union by attributing the struggle to the Cold War against the USSR at the Congresses of the World Psychiatric Association
- Awards: Hero of Socialist Labour, two Orders of Lenin, four Orders of the Red Banner of Labour, USSR State Prize
- Scientific career
- Fields: Forensic psychiatry and clinical psychiatry
- Workplaces: Serbsky Institute for Forensic Psychiatry, Institute of Psychiatry of the USSR Academy of Medical Sciences, All-Union Mental Health Research Center of the USSR Academy of Medical Sciences

Andrei Vladimirovich Snezhnevsky (Russian: Андре́й Влади́мирович Снежне́вский, IPA: [sʲnʲɪˈʐnʲefskʲɪj]; 20 May [O.S. 7 May] 1904 – 12 July 1987) was a Soviet psychiatrist whose name was lent to the unbridled broadening of the diagnostic borders of schizophrenia in the Soviet Union. He coined the term sluggish schizophrenia, an embodiment of history of repressive psychiatry, and a direct participant in psychiatric repression against dissidents.

He was an academician of the USSR Academy of Medical Sciences, the director of the Serbsky Institute for Forensic Psychiatry (1950–1951), the director of the Institute of Psychiatry of the USSR Academy of Medical Sciences (1962–1987), and the director of the All-Union Mental Health Research Center of the USSR Academy of Medical Sciences (1982–1987).

== Sluggish schizophrenia ==
At the height of his power, Snezhnevsky dominated the whole of Soviet psychiatry. He forced the psychiatric community in the USSR and in many of its Eastern European satellites to adopt the diagnosis of sluggish schizophrenia as dogma. Starting in the early 1950s, Snezhnevsky opposed the concept of "soft" schizophrenia but later promoted the same idea under a different title: "slow-flowing", or "sluggish." The term "sluggish schizophrenia" was invented by Snezhnevsky and became widespread by the 1960s. The prevalence of Snezhnevsky's theories directly led to a broadening of the boundaries of disease such that even the mildest behavioral change could be interpreted as indication of mental disorder. Despite his power and virtual monopolies on textbooks and conferences, some prominent Soviet doctors were unwilling to accept Snezhnevsky's methods, such as Iosif Polishchuk in Kyiv, and Fyodor Detengof in Dushanbe.

== Political abuse of psychiatry ==
Snezhnevsky was long attacked in the West as an exemplar of political abuse of psychiatry in the Soviet Union. He was charged with cynically developing a system of diagnosis which could be bent for political purposes and, in dozens of cases, he personally signed a commission decision on legal insanity of mentally healthy dissidents including Vladimir Bukovsky, Natalya Gorbanevskaya, Leonid Plyushch, Mikola Plakhotnyuk, Petro Grigorenko. Some of Snezhnevsky's employees say that one day in a selected auditorium, when discussing the situation in the country, he also gave the diagnosis of sluggish schizophrenia to Andrei Sakharov in absentia. Also in absentia, he diagnosed Joseph Brodsky with the same disease and concluded that he was "not a valuable person at all". As Oleh Wolansky noted, professor Snezhnevsky did not hesitate to act against principles of the Hippocratic Oath. On the covert orders of the KGB, thousands of social and political reformers—Soviet "dissidents"—were incarcerated in mental hospitals after being labelled with diagnoses of "sluggish schizophrenia", a disease fabricated by Snezhnevsky and "Moscow school" of psychiatry. The belief that career development depended on loyalty to the Party and that the Party and its interests were cardinal can partly explain why Snezhnevsky, who earnestly defended the rights of his patients at the frontline hospital during the massive destruction of World War II, also employed his scientific regalia and academic title to legitimate the psychiatric confinement of dissenters. However, Alexander Tiganov, a pupil of Snezhnevsky and full member of the Russian Academy of Medical Sciences, believes his teacher was honest in his diagnosing dissenters. In 2011, Tiganov said it was rumored that Snezhnevsky took pity on dissenters and gave them a diagnosis required for placing in a special hospital to save them from a prison, but it was not true, he honestly did his medical duty. The same ideas are voiced in the 2014 interview by Anatoly Smulevich, a pupil of Snezhnevsky, full member of the Russian Academy of Medical Sciences; he says what was attributed to Snesnevsky was that he recognized the healthy as the ill, it did not happen and is pure slander, it is completely ruled out for him to give a diagnosis to a healthy person.

== Discredit at the Royal College ==
In 1980, the Special Committee on the Political Abuse of Psychiatry, established by the Royal College of Psychiatrists in 1978, charged Snezhnevsky with involvement in the abuse and recommended that Snezhnevsky, who had been honoured as a Corresponding Fellow of the Royal College of Psychiatrists, be invited to attend the college's Court of Electors to answer criticisms because he was responsible for the compulsory detention of celebrated dissident, Leonid Plyushch. Instead Snezhnevsky chose to resign his Fellowship.

Snezhevsky wrote the letter to the president of the Royal College:

The Royal College has taken a very dubious function of intervening into the inner affairs of national psychiatric associations and using mentally-ill patients for political purposes. I sincerely hope that none of the members… seriously believes that in the Soviet Union mentally-healthy people could be forcibly put into mental hospitals.

The college's Committee on Abuse passed the following judgment:

The evidence is now sufficient to conclude that Professor Snezhnevsky has acted unethically and no longer warrants a place of honour in the Royal College of Psychiatrists.

== Other contributions to psychiatry ==
In 1968, Snezhnevsky wrote of a distinction between the positive and negative symptoms of schizophrenia, a concept long attributed to Snezhnevky but in fact introduced by John Hughlings Jackson and John Russell Reynolds. The concept came to be increasingly used in schizophrenia research and classification since the 1970s, citing his colleague I.F. Ovchinnikov that the symptoms appear to exist "as if on two levels".

The American Psychiatric Association at its annual meeting held in San Francisco in 1970 honored Snezhnevsky by naming him a "distinguished fellow" for his "outstanding contribution to psychiatry and related sciences."

Snezhnevsky created his own school in psychiatry. The disciples of his school are Ruben Nadzharov, Taksiarkhis Papadopulos, Gregory Rotstein, Moisey Vrono, Marat Vartanyan, Nikolay Zharikov, Anatoly Anufriev, Nikolay Shumsky, Alexander Tiganov, Irina Shakhmatova-Pavlova, Anatoly Smulevich. Snezhnevsky worked together with Smulevich every day for 20 years. In the Soviet Union, Snezhnevsky's school alone had the exclusive right to truth and held key positions in psychiatry. Doctors who wished to gain more knowledge were unable to do so, because all textbooks and handbooks on psychiatry described only the views of Snezhnevsky's school.

== Estimations ==
According to the psychiatrist Marina Voikhanskaya, Academician Snezhnevsky and his "school" have debased, reduced Russian psychiatry to a semi-amateur level and single doctrine about schizophrenia, in the terms of which alcoholic psychoses and alcoholism are considered schizophrenia; congenital idiocy in the children of alcoholics is considered premature schizophrenia; and dissent is considered schizophrenia with delusions of reform.

As reported by the psychiatrist Boris Zoubok, who worked at the Kashchenko hospital under Snezhnevsky and afterwards settled in the US, Snezhnevsky and his colleagues genuinely believed in their concept of dissent as mental disease and in the method of diagnosis.

According to Moscow psychiatrist Mikhail Buyanov, Snezhnevsky discovered nothing; he muddled everything he attempted, could not find anything.

According to Moscow psychiatrist Alexander Danilin, the so-called "nosological" approach in the Moscow psychiatric school established by Snezhnevsky boiled down to the ability to make a single diagnosis, schizophrenia. Such psychiatry, said Danilin, is not science but a system of opinions to which people by the thousands fell victim. Millions of lives were disabled by virtue of the concept "sluggish schizophrenia" introduced by Snezhnevsky, whom Danilin called a state criminal. However, the founder of the Moscow Helsinki Group Yuri Orlov has the opinion that Snezhnevsky did not willingly participate in the political abuse of psychiatry, and that the real criminal was Georgy Morozov, the director of the Serbsky Institute, who collaborated with the KGB since his students days.

St Petersburg academic psychiatrist professor Yuri Nuller notes that the concept of Snezhnevsky's school allowed psychiatrists to consider, for example, schizoid psychopathy and even schizoid character traits as early, delayed in their development, stages of the inevitable progredient process, rather than as personality traits inherent to the individual, the dynamics of which might depend on various external factors. The same also applied to a number of other personality disorders. It entailed the extremely broadened diagnostics of sluggish (neurosis-like, psychopathy-like) schizophrenia. Despite a number of its controversial premises and in line with the traditions of then Soviet science, Snezhnevsky's hypothesis has immediately acquired the status of dogma which was later overcome in other disciplines but firmly stuck in psychiatry. Snezhnevsky's concept, with its dogmatism, proved to be psychologically comfortable for many psychiatrists, relieving them from doubt when making a diagnosis. That carried a great danger: any deviation from a norm evaluated by a doctor could be regarded as an early phase of schizophrenia, with all ensuing consequences. It resulted in the broad opportunity for voluntary and involuntary abuses of psychiatry. But Snezhnevsky did not take civil and scientific courage to reconsider his concept which clearly reached a deadlock.

In his article of 2002, a former president of the American Psychiatric Association Alan A. Stone, who as a member of team had examined Soviet dissident Petro Grigorenko and found him mentally healthy in 1979, disregarded the findings of the World Psychiatric Association and the later avowal of Soviet psychiatrists themselves and instead claimed that there were no political abuses of psychiatry in the Soviet Union. He asserted that Snezhnevsky was wrongly condemned by critics and argued that it was time for psychiatry in the Western countries to reconsider the accounts of political abuse of psychiatry in the USSR in the hope of discovering that Soviet psychiatrists were more deserving of sympathy than condemnation.

Helen Lavretsky supposes that a totalitarian regime, the lack of a democratic tradition in Russia, and oppression and "extermination" of the best psychiatrists during the 1930–50 period prepared the ground for the abuse of psychiatry and Russian-Soviet concept of schizophrenia.

== Awards ==
He was honored with the title of a Hero of Socialist Labour, two Orders of Lenin, four Orders of the Red Banner of Labour, and the USSR State Prize.

== Death ==
Having learnt of his diagnosis of lung cancer and facing his death within a few years, Snezhnevsky started lamenting over his making a lot of blunders at the Pavlovian session and departed from his indisputable tone as to his own concept. He died on 12 July 1987 in Moscow and was buried in the Kuntsevo Cemetery.

== Interesting facts ==
Snezhnesky examined Andriy Slyusarchuk as a child, was kind to him and presented him the book Your Abilities, Man used by Slyusarchuk to be taught in the field.

== See also ==
- Political abuse of psychiatry in the Soviet Union
- Andriy Slyusarchuk
