= Comorbidity =

Co-occurrence of two or more diseases

In medicine, comorbidity refers to the simultaneous presence of two or more medical conditions in a person; often co-occurring (that is, concomitant or concurrent) with a primary condition. It originates from the Latin term morbus (meaning "sickness") prefixed with co- ("together") and suffixed with -ity (to indicate a state or condition). Comorbidity includes all additional ailments a person may experience alongside a primary diagnosis, which can be either physiological or psychological in nature. In the context of mental health, comorbidity may refer to the concurrent existence of mental disorders, for example, the co-occurrence of depressive and anxiety disorders. The concept of multimorbidity is related to comorbidity but is different in its definition and approach, focusing on the presence of multiple diseases or conditions in a person without the need to specify one as primary.

== Definition ==
The term "comorbid" has three definitions:

1. to indicate a medical condition existing simultaneously but independently with another condition in a patient.
2. to indicate a medical condition in a patient that causes, is caused by, or is otherwise related to another condition in the same patient.
3. to indicate two or more medical conditions existing simultaneously regardless of their causal relationship.

Comorbidity can indicate either a condition existing simultaneously, but independently with another condition or a related derivative medical condition. The latter sense of the term causes some overlap with the concept of complications. For example, in longstanding diabetes mellitus, the extent to which coronary artery disease is an independent comorbidity versus a diabetic complication is not easy to measure, because both diseases are quite multivariate and there are likely aspects of both simultaneity and consequence. The same is true of intercurrent diseases in pregnancy. In other examples, the true independence or relation is not ascertainable because syndromes and associations are often identified long before pathogenetic commonalities are confirmed (and, in some examples, before they are even hypothesized). In psychiatric diagnoses it has been argued in part that this "'use of imprecise language may lead to correspondingly imprecise thinking', [and] this usage of the term 'comorbidity' should probably be avoided." However, in many medical examples, such as comorbid diabetes mellitus and coronary artery disease, it makes little difference which word is used, as long as the medical complexity is duly recognized and addressed.

=== Difference from multimorbidity ===
Comorbidity is often referred to as multimorbidity even though the two are considered distinct clinical scenarios.

Comorbidity means that one 'index' condition is the focus of attention, and others are viewed in relation to this. In contrast, multimorbidity describes someone having two or more long-term (chronic) conditions without any of them holding priority over the others. This distinction is important in how the healthcare system treats people and helps making clear the specific settings in which the use of one or the other term can be preferred. Multimorbidity offers a more general and person-centered concept that allows focusing on all of the patient's symptoms and providing a more holistic care. In other settings, for example in pharmaceutical research, comorbidity might often be the more useful term to use.

== Mental health ==
In psychiatry, psychology, and mental health counseling, comorbidity refers to the presence of more than one diagnosis occurring in an individual at the same time. However, in psychiatric classification, comorbidity does not necessarily imply the presence of multiple diseases, but instead can reflect current inability to supply a single diagnosis accounting for all symptoms. On the DSM Axis I, major depressive disorder is a very common comorbid disorder. The Axis II personality disorders are often criticized because their comorbidity rates are excessively high, approaching 60% in some cases. Critics assert this indicates these categories of mental illness are too imprecisely distinguished to be usefully valid for diagnostic purposes, impacting treatment and resource allocation. Symptom overlap is a key component against DSM classification and serves as a note towards redefining criteria in disorders that the root cause may not be understood thoroughly. Regardless of criticisms, it stands that, annually, up to 45% of mental health patients fit the criteria for a comorbid diagnosis. A comorbid diagnosis is associated with more severe symptomatic expression and greater chance of dismal prognosis. Certain diagnoses such as ADHD, autism, OCD, and mood disorders have higher rates of co-occurring or being prevalent in separate diagnoses. "Comorbidity in OCD is the rule rather than the exception" with OCD diagnoses facing a lifetime rate of 90%. With overlapping symptoms comes overlap in treatment as well, CBT for example is common for both ADHD and OCD with pediatric onset and can be effective for both in a comorbid diagnosis. OCD and eating disorders have a high rate of occurrence, it is estimated that 20-60% of patients with an eating disorder have OCD. More often, comorbidity complicates and can prevent treatment efficacy on a varying scale depending on the circumstances.

The term 'comorbidity' was introduced in medicine by Feinstein (1970) to describe cases in which a 'distinct additional clinical entity' occurred before or during treatment for the 'index disease', the original or primary diagnosis. Since the terms were coined, meta studies have shown that criteria used to determine the index disease were flawed and subjective, and moreover, trying to identify an index disease as the cause of the others can be counterproductive to understanding and treating interdependent conditions. In response, 'multimorbidity' was introduced to describe concurrent conditions without relativity to or implied dependency on another disease, so that the complex interactions to emerge naturally under analysis of the system as a whole.

Although the term 'comorbidity' has recently become very fashionable in psychiatry, its use to indicate the concomitance of two or more psychiatric diagnoses is said to be incorrect because in most cases it is unclear whether the concomitant diagnoses actually reflect the presence of distinct clinical entities or refer to multiple manifestations of a single clinical entity. It has been argued that because "'the use of imprecise language may lead to correspondingly imprecise thinking', this usage of the term 'comorbidity' should probably be avoided".

Due to its artifactual nature, psychiatric comorbidity has been considered as a Kuhnian anomaly leading the DSM to a scientific crisis and a comprehensive review on the matter considers comorbidity as an epistemological challenge to modern psychiatry. The Hierarchical Taxonomy of Psychopathology is a leading alternative classification system that addresses these concerns about comorbidity.

== History ==
Widespread study of physical and mental pathology found its place in psychiatry. I. Jensen (1975), J.H. Boyd (1984), W.C. Sanderson (1990), Yuri Nuller (1993), D.L. Robins (1994), A. B. Smulevich (1997), C.R. Cloninger (2002) and other psychiatrists discovered a number of comorbid conditions in those with psychiatric disorders.

The influence of comorbidity on the clinical progression of the primary (basic) physical disorder, effectiveness of the medicinal therapy and immediate and long-term prognosis of the patients was researched by physicians and scientists of various medical fields in many countries across the globe. These scientists and physicians included: M. H. Kaplan (1974), T. Pincus (1986), M. E. Charlson (1987), F. G. Schellevis (1993), H. C. Kraemer (1995), M. van den Akker (1996), A. Grimby (1997), S. Greenfield (1999), M. Fortin (2004) & A. Vanasse (2004), C. Hudon (2005), L. B. Lazebnik (2005), A. L. Vertkin (2008), G. E. Caughey (2008), F. I. Belyalov (2009), L. A. Luchikhin (2010) and many others.

=== Inception of the term ===
Many centuries ago the doctors propagated the viability of a complex approach in the diagnosis of disease and the treatment of the patient, however, modern medicine, which boasts a wide range of diagnostic methods and a variety of therapeutic procedures, stresses specification. This brought up a question: How to wholly evaluate the state of a patient who has a number of diseases simultaneously, where to start from and which disease(s) require(s) primary and subsequent treatment? For many years this question stood out unanswered, until 1970, when a renowned American doctor epidemiologist and researcher, A.R. Feinstein, who had greatly influenced the methods of clinical diagnosis and particularly methods used in the field of clinical epidemiology, came out with the term of "comorbidity". The appearance of comorbidity was demonstrated by Feinstein using the example of patients physically affected by rheumatic fever, discovering the worst state of the patients, who simultaneously had multiple diseases. In due course of time after its discovery, comorbidity was distinguished as a separate scientific-research discipline in many branches of medicine.

=== Evolution of the term ===
Presently there is no agreed-upon terminology of comorbidity. Some authors bring forward different meanings of comorbidity and multi-morbidity, defining the former, as the presence of a number of diseases in a patient, connected to each other through proven pathogenetic mechanisms and the latter, as the presence of a number of diseases in a patient, not having any connection to each other through any of the proven to date pathogenetic mechanisms. Others affirm that multi-morbidity is the combination of a number of chronic or acute diseases and clinical symptoms in a person and do not stress the similarities or differences in their pathogenesis. However the principle clarification of the term was given by H. C. Kraemer and M. van den Akker, determining comorbidity as the combination in a patient of 2 or more chronic diseases (disorders), pathogenetically related to each other or coexisting in a single patient independent of each disease's activity in the patient.

== Synonyms ==
- Polymorbidity
- Multifactorial diseases
- Polypathy
- Dual diagnosis, used for mental health issues
- Pluralpathology

== Epidemiology ==
Comorbidity is widespread among the patients admitted at multidiscipline hospitals. During the phase of initial medical help, the patients having multiple diseases simultaneously are a norm rather than an exception. Prevention and treatment of chronic diseases declared by the World Health Organization, as a priority project for the second decade of the 20th century, are meant to better the quality of the global population. This is the reason for an overall tendency of large-scale epidemiological researches in different medical fields, carried-out using serious statistical data. In most of the carried-out, randomized, clinical researches the authors study patients with single refined pathology, making comorbidity an exclusive criterion. This is why it is hard to relate researches, directed towards the evaluation of the combination of ones or the other separate disorders, to works regarding the sole research of comorbidity. The absence of a single scientific approach to the evaluation of comorbidity leads to omissions in clinical practice. It is hard not to notice the absence of comorbidity in the taxonomy (systematics) of disease, presented in ICD-10.

=== Clinico-pathological comparisons ===
All the fundamental researches of medical documentation, directed towards the study of the spread of comorbidity and influence of its structure, were conducted until the 1990s. The sources of information, used by the researchers and scientists, working on the matter of comorbidity, were case histories, hospital records of patients and other medical documentation, kept by family doctors, insurance companies and even in the archives of patients in old houses.

The listed methods of obtaining medical information are mainly based on clinical experience and qualification of the physicians, carrying out clinically, instrumentally and laboratorially confirmed diagnosis. This is why despite their competence, they are highly subjective. No analysis of the results of postmortem of deceased patients was carried out for any of the comorbidity researches.

"It is the duty of the doctor to carry out autopsy of the patients they treat", said once professor M. Y. Mudrov. Autopsy allows you to exactly determine the structure of comorbidity and the direct cause of death of each patient independent of his/her age, gender and gender specific characteristics. Statistical data of comorbid pathology, based on these sections, are mainly devoid of subjectivism.

=== Research ===
The analysis of a decade long Australian research based on the study of patients having 6 widespread chronic diseases demonstrated that nearly half of the elderly patients with arthritis also had hypertension, 20% had cardiac disorders and 14% had type 2 diabetes. More than 60% of asthmatic patients complained of concurrent arthritis, 20% complained of cardiac problems and 16% had type 2 diabetes.

In patients with chronic kidney disease (renal insufficiency) the frequency of coronary heart disease is 22% higher and new coronary events 3.4 times higher compared to patients without kidney function disorders. Progression of CKD towards end stage renal disease requiring renal replacement therapy is accompanied by increasing prevalence of Coronary Heart Disease and sudden death from cardiac arrest.

Fibromyalgia is a condition which is comorbid with several others, including but not limited to; depression, anxiety, headache, irritable bowel syndrome, chronic fatigue syndrome, systemic lupus erythematosus, rheumatoid arthritis, migraine, and panic disorder.

The number of comorbid diseases increases with age. Comorbidity increases by 10% in ages up to 19 years, up to 80% in people of ages 80 and older. According to data by M. Fortin, based on the analysis of 980 case histories, taken from daily practice of a family doctor, the spread of comorbidity is from 69% in young patients, up to 93% among middle aged people and up to 98% patients of older age groups. At the same time the number of chronic diseases varies from 2.8 in young patients and 6.4 among older patients.

The fourteen-year research conducted on 883 patients of idiopathic thrombocytopenic purpura (Werlhof disease), conducted in Great Britain, shows that the given disease is related to a wide range of physical pathologies. In the comorbid structure of these patients, most frequently present are malignant neoplasms, locomotorium disorders, skin and genitourinary system disorders, as well as haemorrhagic complications and other autoimmune diseases, the risk of whose progression during the first five years of the primary disease exceeds the limit of 5%.

In research conducted on 196 larynx cancer patients, it was determined that the survival rate of patients at various stages of cancer differs depending upon the presence or absence of comorbidity. At the first stage of cancer the survival rate in the presence of comorbidity is 17% and in its absence it is 83%, in the second stage of cancer the rate of survivability is 14% and 76%, in the third stage it is 28% and 66% and in the fourth stage of cancer it is 0% and 50% respectively. Overall the survivability rate of comorbid larynx cancer patients is 59% lower than the survivability rate of patients without comorbidity.

Except for therapists and general physicians, the problem of comorbidity is also often faced by specialists. However, they seldom pay attention to the coexistence of a whole range of disorders in a single patient and mostly conduct the treatment of specific to their specialization diseases. In current practice, urologists, gynecologists, ENT specialists, eye specialists, surgeons and other specialists often mention only the diseases related to their "own" field of specialization, passing on the discovery of other accompanying pathologies "under the control" of other specialists. It has become an unspoken rule for any specialized department to carry out consultations of the therapist, who feels obliged to carry out symptomatic analysis of the patient, as well as to the form the diagnostic and therapeutic concept, taking in view the potential risks for the patient and his long-term prognosis.

Based on the available clinical and scientific data, it is possible to conclude that comorbidity has a range of undoubted properties, which characterize it as a heterogeneous and often encountered event, which enhances the seriousness of the condition and worsens the patient's prospects. The heterogeneous character of comorbidity is due to the wide range of reasons causing it.

== Causes ==
- Anatomic proximity of diseased organs
- Singular pathogenetic mechanism of a number of diseases
- Terminable cause-effect relation between the diseases
- One disease resulting from complications of another
- Pleiotropy

The factors responsible for the development of comorbidity can be chronic infections, inflammations, involutional and systematic metabolic changes, iatrogenesis, social status, ecology and genetic susceptibility.

== Types ==
- Trans-syndromal comorbidity: coexistence, in a single patient, of two and/or more syndromes, pathogenetically related to each other.
- Trans-nosological comorbidity: coexistence, in a single patient, of two and/or more syndromes, pathogenetically not related to each other.

The division of comorbidity as per syndromal and nosological principles is mainly preliminary and inaccurate, however it allows us to understand that comorbidity can be connected to a singular cause or common mechanisms of pathogenesis of the conditions, which sometimes explains the similarity in their clinical aspects, which makes it difficult to differentiate between nosologies.

- Etiological comorbidity: It is caused by concurrent damage to different organs and systems, which is caused by a singular pathological agent (for example due to alcoholism in patients with chronic alcohol intoxication; pathologies associated with smoking; systematic damage due to collagenoses).
- Complicated comorbidity: It is the result of the primary disease and often subsequent after sometime after its destabilization appears in the shape of target lesions (for example chronic nephratony resulting from diabetic nephropathy (Kimmelstiel-Wilson disease) in patients with type 2 diabetes; development of brain infarction resulting from complications due to hypertensive crisis in patients with hypertension).
- Iatrogenic comorbidity: It appears as a result of necessitated negative effect of the doctor on the patient, under the conditions of pre determine danger of one or the other medical procedure (for example, glucocorticosteroid osteoporosis in patients treated for a long time using systematic hormonal agents (preparations); drug-induced hepatitis resulting from chemotherapy against TB, prescribed due to the conversion of tubercular tests).
- Unspecified (NOS) comorbidity: This type assumes the presence of singular pathogenetic mechanisms of development of diseases, comprising this combination, but require a number of tests, proving the hypothesis of the researcher or physician (for example, erectile dysfunction as an early sign of general atherosclerosis (ASVD); occurrence of erosive-ulcerative lesions in the mucous membrane of the upper gastrointestinal tract in "vascular" patients).
- "Arbitrary" comorbidity: initial alogism of the combination of diseases is not proven, but soon can be explained with clinical and scientific point of view (for example, combination of coronary heart disease (CHD) and choledocholithiasis; combination of acquired heart valvular disease and psoriasis).

== Structure ==
There are a number of rules for the formulation of clinical diagnosis for comorbid patients, which must be followed by a practitioner. The main principle is to distinguish in diagnosis the primary and background diseases, as well as their complications and accompanying pathologies.

- Primary disease: This is the nosological form, which itself or as a result of complications calls for the foremost necessity for treatment at the time due to threat to the patient's life and danger of disability. Primary is the disease, which becomes the cause of seeking medical help or the reason for the patient's death. If the patient has several primary diseases it is important to first of all understand the combined primary diseases (rival or concomitant).
- Rival diseases: These are the concurrent nosological forms in a patient, interdependent in etiologies and pathogenesis, but equally sharing the criterion of a primary disease (for example, transmural myocardial infarction and massive thromboembolism of pulmonary artery, caused by phlebemphraxis of lower limbs). For practicing pathologist rival are two or more diseases, exhibited in a single patient, each of which by itself or through its complications could cause the patient's death.
- Polypathia: Diseases with different etiologies and pathogenesis, each of which separately could not cause death, but, concurring during development and reciprocally exacerbating each other, they cause the patient's death (for example, osteoporotic fracture of the surgical neck of the femur and hypostatic pneumonia).
- Background disease: This helps in the occurrence of or adverse development of the primary disease increases its dangers and helps in the development of complications. This disease as well as the primary one requires immediate treatment (for example, type 2 diabetes).
- Complications: Nosologies having pathogenetic relation to the primary disease, supporting the adverse progression of the disorder, causing acute worsening of the patient's conditions (are a part of the complicated comorbidity). In a number of cases the complications of the primary disease and related to it etiological and pathogenetic factors, are indicated as conjugated disease. In this case they must be identified as the cause of comorbidity. Complications are listed in a descending order of prognostic or disabling significance.
- Associating diseases: Nosological units not connected etiologically and pathogenetically with the primary disease (Listed in the order of significance).

== Diagnosis ==
Many tests attempt to standardize the "weight" or value of comorbid conditions, whether they are secondary or tertiary illnesses. Each test attempts to consolidate each individual comorbid condition into a single, predictive variable that measures mortality or other outcomes. Researchers have validated such tests because of their predictive value, but no one test is as yet recognized as a standard.

=== Charlson Comorbidity Index (CCI) ===
The Charlson Comorbidity Index predicts the mortality for a patient who may have a range of comorbid conditions, such as heart disease, AIDS, or cancer (a total of 17 conditions). Each condition is assigned a score of 1, 2, 3, or 6, depending on the risk of dying associated with each one. Scores are summed to provide a total score to predict mortality. Many variations of the Charlson comorbidity index have been presented, including the Charlson/Deyo, Charlson/Romano, Charlson/Manitoba, and Charlson/D'Hoores comorbidity indices.

For a physician, this score is helpful in deciding how aggressively to treat a condition. For example, a patient may have cancer with comorbid heart disease and diabetes. These comorbidities may be so severe that the costs and risks of cancer treatment would outweigh its short-term benefit.

Since patients often do not know how severe their conditions are, nurses were originally supposed to review a patient's chart and determine whether a particular condition was present in order to calculate the index. Subsequent studies have adapted the comorbidity index into a questionnaire for patients.

The Charlson index, especially the Charlson/Deyo, followed by the Elixhauser have been most commonly referred by the comparative studies of comorbidity and multimorbidity measures.

=== Comorbidity–Polypharmacy Score (CPS) ===
The comorbidity–polypharmacy score (CPS) is a simple measure that consists of the sum of all known comorbid conditions and all associated medications. There is no specific matching between comorbid conditions and corresponding medications. Instead, the number of medications is assumed to be a reflection of the "intensity" of the associated comorbid conditions. This score has been tested and validated extensively in the trauma population, demonstrating good correlation with mortality, morbidity, triage, and hospital readmissions. Of interest, increasing levels of CPS were associated with significantly lower 90-day survival in the original study of the score in trauma population.

=== Elixhauser Comorbidity Index ===
The Elixhauser comorbidity measure was developed using administrative data from a statewide California inpatient database from all non-federal inpatient community hospital stays in California (n = 1,779,167). The Elixhauser comorbidity measure developed a list of 30 comorbidities relying on the ICD-9-CM coding manual. The comorbidities were not simplified as an index because each comorbidity affected outcomes (length of hospital stay, hospital changes, and mortality) differently among different patients groups. The comorbidities identified by the Elixhauser comorbidity measure are significantly associated with in-hospital mortality and include both acute and chronic conditions. van Walraven et al. have derived and validated an Elixhauser comorbidity index that summarizes disease burden and can discriminate for in-hospital mortality. In addition, a systematic review and comparative analysis shows that among various comorbidities indices, Elixhauser index is a better predictor of the risk especially beyond 30 days of hospitalization.

=== Diagnosis-related group ===
Patients who are more seriously ill tend to require more hospital resources than patients who are less seriously ill, even though they are admitted to the hospital for the same reason. Recognizing this, the diagnosis-related group (DRG) manually splits certain DRGs based on the presence of secondary diagnoses for specific complications or comorbidities (CC). The same applies to Healthcare Resource Groups (HRGs) in the UK.

=== Clinical example of evaluation ===
Patient S., 73 years, called an ambulance because of a sudden pressing pain in the chest. It was known from the case history that the patient had CHD for many years. Such chest pains were experienced by her earlier as well, but they always disappeared after a few minutes of sublingual administration of organic nitrates. This time taking three tablets of nitroglycerine did not kill the pain. It was also known from the case history that the patient had twice had myocardial infarctions during the last ten years, as well as had an Acute Cerebrovascular Event with sinistral hemiplegia more than 15 years ago. Apart from that the patient had hypertension, type 2 diabetes with diabetic nephropathy, hysteromyoma, cholelithiasis, osteoporosis and varicose pedi-vein disease. It was also learned that the patient regularly takes a number of antihypertensive drugs, urinatives and oral antihyperglycemic remedies, as well as statins, antiplatelet and nootropics. In the past the patient had undergone cholecystectomy due to cholelithiasis more than 20 years ago, as well as the extraction of a cataract of the right eye 4 years ago. The patient was admitted to cardiac intensive care unit at a general hospital diagnosed for acute transmural myocardial infarction. During the check-up moderate azotemia, mild erythronormoblastic anemia, proteinuria and lowering of left vascular ejection fraction were also identified.

=== Methods of evaluation ===
There are currently several generally accepted methods of evaluating (measuring) comorbidity:

1. Cumulative Illness Rating Scale (CIRS): Developed in 1968 by B. S. Linn, it became a revolutionary discovery, because it gave the practicing doctors a chance to calculate the number and severity of chronic illnesses in the structure of the comorbid state of their patients. The proper use of CIRS means separate cumulative evaluation of each of the biological systems: "0" The selected system corresponds to the absence of disorders, "1": Slight (mild) abnormalities or previously had disorders, "2": Illness requiring the prescription of medicinal therapy, "3": Disease, which caused disability and "4": Acute organ insufficiency requiring emergency therapy. The CIRS system evaluates comorbidity in cumulative score, which can be from 0 to 56. As per its developers, the maximum score is not compatible with the patient's life.
2. Cumulative Illness Rating Scale for Geriatrics (CIRS-G): This system is similar to CIRS, but for aged patients, offered by M. D. Miller in 1991. This system takes into account the age of the patient and the peculiarities of the old age disorders.
3. The Kaplan–Feinstein Index: This index was created in 1973 based on the study of the effect of the associated diseases on patients with type 2 diabetes during a period of 5 years. In this system of comorbidity evaluation all the present (in a patient) diseases and their complications, depending on the level of their damaging effect on body organs, are classified as mild, moderate and severe. In this case the conclusion about cumulative comorbidity is drawn on the basis of the most decompensated biological system. This index gives cumulative, but less detailed as compared to CIRS, assessment of the condition of each of the biological systems: "0": Absence of disease, "1": Mild course of the disease, "2": Moderate disease, "3": Severe disease. The Kaplan–Feinstein Index evaluates comorbidity by cumulative score, which can vary from 0 to 36. Apart from that the notable deficiency of this method of evaluating comorbidity is the excessive generalization of diseases (nosologies) and the absence of a large number of illnesses in the scale, which, probably, should be noted in the "miscellaneous" column, which undermines (decreases) this method's objectivity and productivity of this method. However the indisputable advantage of the Kaplan–Feinstein Index as compared to CIRS is in the capability of independent analysis of malignant neoplasms and their severities. Using this method patient S's, age 73, comorbidity can be evaluated as of moderate severity (16 out of 36 points), however its prognostic value is unclear, because of the absence of the interpretation of the overall score, resulting from the accumulation of the patient's diseases.
4. Charlson Index: This index is meant for the long-term prognosis of comorbid patients and was developed by M. E. Charlson in 1987. This index is based on a point scoring system (from 0 to 40) for the presence of specific associated diseases and is used for prognosis of lethality. For its calculation the points are accumulated, according to associated diseases, as well as the addition of a single point for each 10 years of age for patients of ages above forty years (in 50 years 1 point, 60 years 2 points etc.). The distinguishing feature and undisputed advantage of the Charlson Index is the capability of evaluating the patient's age and determination of the patient's mortality rate, which in the absence of comorbidity is 12%, at 1–2 points it is 26%; at 3–4 points it is 52% and with the accumulation of more than 5 points it is 85%. However, this method has some deficiencies: Evaluating comorbidity severity of many diseases is not considered, as well as the absence of many important for prognosis disorders. Apart from that it is doubtful that possible prognosis for a patient with bronchial asthma and chronic leukemia is comparable to the prognosis for the patient ailing from myocardial infarction and cerebral infarction. In this case comorbidity of patient S, 73 years of age according to this method, is equivalent to mild state (9 out of 40 points).
5. Modified Charlson Index: R. A. Deyo, D. C. Cherkin, and Marcia Ciol added chronic forms of ischemic cardiac disorder and the stages of chronic cardiac insufficiency to this index in 1992.
6. Elixhauser Index: The Elixhauser comorbidity measure include 30 comorbidities, which are not simplified as an index. Elixhauser shows a better predictive performance for mortality risk especially beyond 30 days of hospitalization.
7. Index of Co-Existent Disease (ICED): This Index was first developed in 1993 by S. Greenfield to evaluate comorbidity in patients with malignant neoplasms, later it also became useful for other categories of patients. This method helps in calculating the duration of a patient's stay at a hospital and the risks of repeated admittance of the same at a hospital after going through surgical procedures. For the evaluation of comorbidity the ICED index suggests to evaluate the patient's condition separately as per two different components: Physiological functional characteristics. The first component comprises 19 associated disorders, each of which is assessed on a 4-point scale, where "0" indicates the absence of disease and "3" indicates the disease's severe form. The second component evaluates the effect of associated diseases on the physical condition of the patient. It assesses 11 physical functions using a 3-point scale, where "0" means normal functionality and "2" means the impossibility of functionality.
8. Geriatric Index of Comorbidity (GIC): Developed in 2002
9. Functional Comorbidity Index (FCI): Developed in 2005.
10. Total Illness Burden Index (TIBI): Developed in 2007.

Analyzing the comorbid state of patient S, 73 years of age, using the most used international comorbidity assessment scales, a doctor would come across totally different evaluation. The uncertainty of these results would somewhat complicate the doctors judgment about the factual level of severity of the patient's condition and would complicate the process of prescribing rational medicinal therapy for the identified disorders. Such problems are faced by doctors on everyday basis, despite all their knowledge about medical science. The main hurdle in the way of inducting comorbidity evaluation systems in broad based diagnostic-therapeutic process is their inconsistency and narrow focus. Despite the variety of methods of evaluation of comorbidity, the absence of a singular generally accepted method, devoid of the deficiencies of the available methods of its evaluation, causes disturbance. The absence of a unified instrument, developed on the basis of colossal international experience, as well as the methodology of its use does not allow comorbidity to become doctor "friendly". At the same time due to the inconsistency in approach to the analysis of comorbid state and absence of components of comorbidity in medical university courses, the practitioner is unclear about its prognostic effect, which makes the generally available systems of associated pathology evaluation unreasoned and therefore un-needed as well.

== Treatment of comorbid patient ==
The effect of comorbid pathologies on clinical implications, diagnosis, prognosis and therapy of many diseases is polyhedral and patient-specific. The interrelation of the disease, age and drug pathomorphism greatly affect the clinical presentation and progress of the primary nosology, character and severity of the complications, worsens the patient's life quality and limit or make difficult the remedial-diagnostic process. Comorbidity affects life prognosis and increases the chances of fatality. The presence of comorbid disorders increases bed days, disability, hinders rehabilitation, increases the number of complications after surgical procedures, and increases the chances of decline in aged people.

A study of inpatient hospital data in the United States in 2011 showed that the presence of a major complication or comorbidity was associated with a great risk of intensive-care unit utilization, ranging from a negligible change for acute myocardial infarction with major complication or comorbidity to nearly nine times more likely for a major joint replacement with major complication or comorbidity.

== See also ==
- Coinfection
- Conditions comorbid to autism spectrum disorders
- Superinfection
- Syndemic
