= Leonid Plyushch =

Ukrainian mathematician (1938–2015)

- Леонід Плющ
- Born: Leonid Ivanovych Plyushch; 26 April 1938; Naryn, Kirghiz SSR, Soviet Union
- Died: 4 June 2015 (aged 77); Bessèges, France
- Citizenship: Soviet Union; France
- Education: Odesa University; Taras Shevchenko National University of Kyiv
- Occupation: Mathematician
- Known for: Human rights activism with participation in the Ukrainian Helsinki Group
- Movement: dissident movement in the Soviet Union
- Spouse: Tatyana Ilinichna Zhitnikova
- Awards: Order For Courage; Antonovych prize (1987)

Leonid Ivanovych Plyushch (Ukrainian: Леоні́д Іва́нович Плющ, IPA: [leoˈn⁽ʲ⁾id iˈwɑnowɪtʃ ˈplʲuʃtʃ]; 26 April 1938 – 4 June 2015) was a Ukrainian mathematician and Soviet dissident.

Although he was employed to work on Soviet space missions, he became disillusioned with some aspects of the Soviet Union, and started to protest, by sending letters to multiple entities and signing petitions and declarations. These activities led to his interrogation and, in 1972, eventual arrest and imprisonment by the Soviet authorities, where he was injected with drugs and mistreated. He was put on trial in secret, closed to public scrutiny, by the Soviet authorities. Eventually, in 1976, he was able to leave the Soviet Union, and later settled in France, after which he became involved in trying to promote human rights.

In 1979, with the help of his wife, he wrote a book describing how he and other dissidents were placed in psychiatric facilities. Throughout his later years, he supported anti-totalitarian publications.

== Early life and career ==
Leonid Plyushch was born into a working-class family in 1938 in Naryn, Kirghizia. His father worked as railway foreman, and died on the front in 1941. Leonid's childhood was marked by tuberculosis of the bone, which he contracted at the age of 8.

Plyushch graduated from Kyiv University in 1962 with a degree in mathematics. In his last year of studies he became interested in the mathematical modeling of biological systems, in particular mental illness, which he sought to model with the help of a computer. This proved too difficult a task, but Plyushch published papers on modeling and regulating simpler biological systems like the blood sugar level. He was eventually hired by the Institute of Cybernetics of the USSR Academy of Sciences, which was often tasked with solving various problems for the Soviet space program.

== Dissident activities ==
Plyushch became a dissident by taking a public stance on political hot topics of the time. In 1968 he protested against the misconduct of the Galanskov–Ginzburg trial by sending a letter to Komsomolskaya Pravda, which was not published. When Soviet troops invaded Czechoslovakia in 1968, Plyushch jointly signed with 16 other Soviet dissidents a declaration of solidarity with the democratic movement in Czechoslovakia. In the same year he joined the Initiative Group for the Defense of Human Rights in the USSR, which sent a letter to the UN Human Rights Commission asking it to investigate the violations by the USSR of the right to hold independent beliefs and to propagate them by legal means. Plyushch was one of the fifteen signatories to An Appeal to The UN Committee for Human Rights. Due to blowback from his political stances, he was dismissed from the Cybernetics Institute in 1968, and the KGB confiscated a number of his manuscripts and interrogated him several times.

== Trial and imprisonment ==
He was arrested in January 1972 on charges of anti-Soviet activity, and was jailed for a year before his trial began. During his trial, the court sat in camera and in the absence of the accused. Although no expert witnesses of any kind were called, Plyushch was declared insane, and was ordered to be "sent for treatment in a special type of hospital." He was locked up in a ward for severely psychotic patients in the Dnipropetrovsk Special Psychiatric Hospital where high doses of haloperidol, insulin and other drugs were administered, which temporarily made him incapable of reading and writing. Three commissions that examined him after a year of detention, one of which was chaired by Andrei Snezhnevsky, found him suffering from "reformist delusions" with "Messianic elements" and "sluggish schizophrenia." On 28 November 1976, Plyushch said, Moscow has taken advantage of the Helsinki security pact to improve its economy while increasing the suppression of political dissenters.

While he was imprisoned, he corresponded with Tatiana Khodorovich. Plyushch's letters to her later formed the basis of the book The Case of Leonid Plyushch, first published in Russian in 1974 by an Amsterdam publisher, and translated into English two years later, which received attention in medical ethics journals. His imprisonment triggered international protests, including a letter by 650 American mathematicians addressed to the Soviet embassy. Henri Cartan brought the case to the attention of the participants to the 1974 International Congress of Mathematicians, which was held in Vancouver. Amnesty International sponsored an International Day for Plyushch in April 1975, and Andrei Sakharov also pleaded on his behalf.

== Freedom and later life ==
Eventually he was allowed to leave the Soviet Union together with his family in 1976. His arrival in the West increased the friction between Western and Soviet psychiatrists leading eventually to a condemnation of Soviet practices by the World Psychiatric Association at the Sixth World Congress of Psychiatry. At a press conference in Paris, Plyushch gave a memorable account of the effects of his detention and medications:

I noted with horror the daily progression of my degradation. I lost interest in politics, then in scientific problems, finally in my wife and children. My speech became blurred; my memory worsened. In the beginning, I reacted strongly to the sufferings of other patients. Eventually I became indifferent. My only thoughts were of toilets, tobacco and the bribes to the male nurses to let me go to the toilet one more time. Then I began to experience a new thought: 'I must remember everything I see here, I told myself, so that I can tell about it afterwards.'

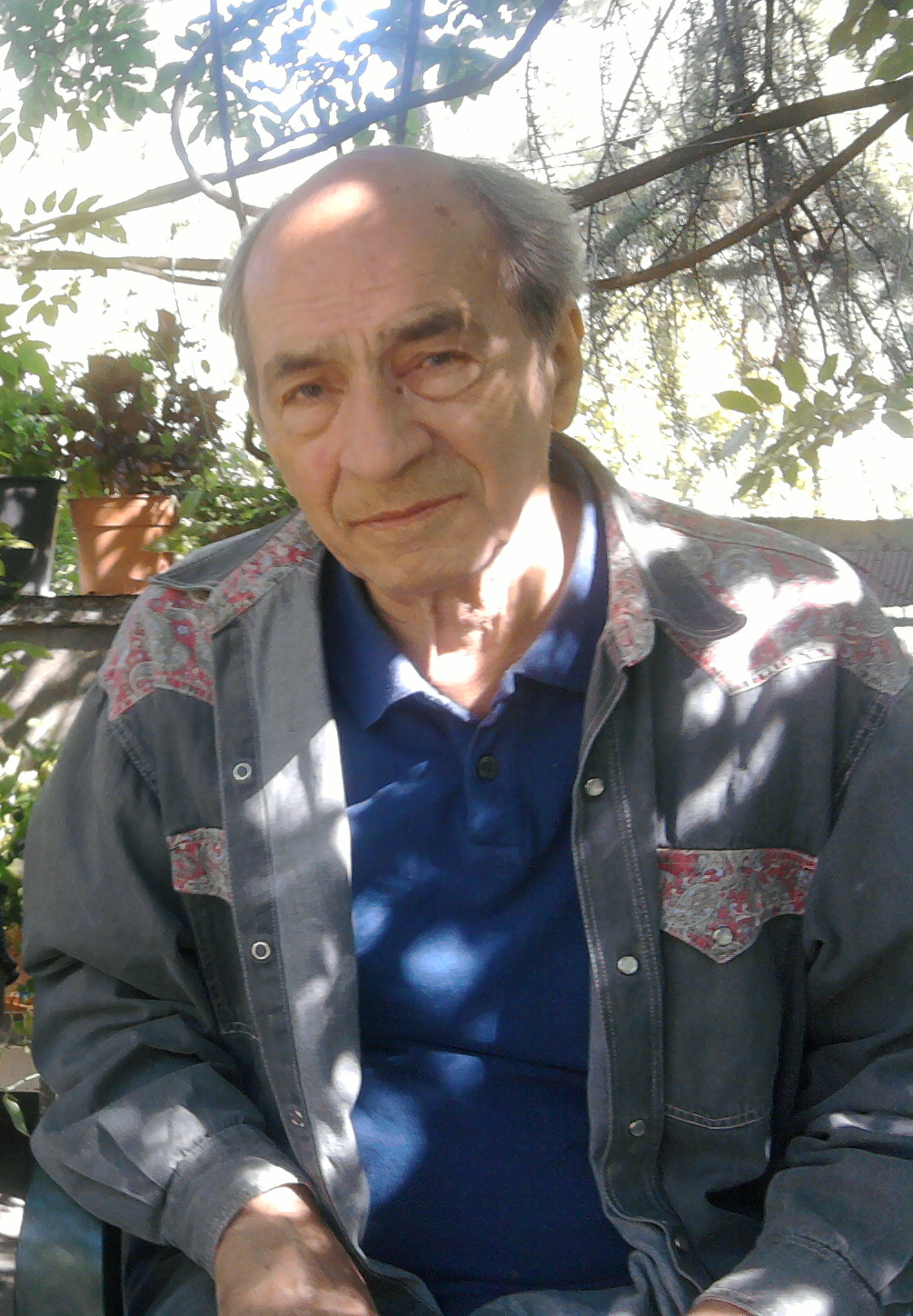
Leonid Plyushch (1939-2015) in Bessèges (France) in 2013

Plyushch became a member of the Ukrainian Helsinki Group in 1977, promoting human rights in his native Ukraine.

On 23 July 1978, Plyushch visited Ukrainians in Australia and addressed the Australian Parliament.

In 1979, with the contribution of his wife, Plyushch published his book History's Carnival: A Dissident's Autobiography in which he described how he and other dissidents were committed to psychiatric hospitals. At the same year, the book was translated into English. In 1980, Andrei Snezhnevsky, who was a Corresponding Fellow of the Royal College of Psychiatry, was invited by his British colleagues to answer criticism relating to Plyushch and other dissidents. He refused to do so, and instead resigned his Fellowship.

Later in life, although he retained communist convictions, Plyushch supported anti-totalitarian publications in other communist countries, including Vietnam.

In 2006, he translated the book Talking with angels (originally Dialogues avec l'ange, ISBN 978-2700700350) into Russian and Ukrainian with his wife Tatiana.

Plyushch died 4 June 2015 in Bessèges, France. His death was reported by a friend and fellow ex-Soviet dissident, Arina Ginzburg.

== Bibliography ==
=== Books ===
- Plyushch, Leonid; Mikhaylov, Mikhaylo; Belotserkovsky, Vadim; Elberfeld, Yan; Andreev, Herman; Vishnevskaya, Yuliya; Yanov, Alexander; Levitin-Krasnov, Anatoly; Etkind, Efim; Kushev, Yevgeny (1976). СССР. Демократические альтернативы: сборник статей и документов [USSR. Democratic alternatives: a collection of articles and documents] (in Russian). Achberg. ISBN 978-3881030700. OCLC 3953394.
- Pljušč, Leonid; Michajlov, Michailo; Belocerkovskij, Vadim; Andreev, German; Elberfeld, Jan; Janov, Aleksandr; Levitin-Krasnov, Anatolij; Etkind, Jefim; Kušev, Jevgenij (1977). UdSSR. Alternativen der demokratischen Opposition. Sammelband [USSR. Alternatives of democratic opposition. Collection] (in German). Achberg. ISBN 978-3881030854.
- Pliouchtch, Léonide; Biélotserkovsky, Vadim; Mikhaïlov, Mikhaïlo; Andreev, Herman; Lévitine-Krasnov, Anatoli; Yanov, Alexandre; Elberfeld, Yan; Etkind, Yéfime; Vichnevskaia, Youlia; Kouchev, Evguéni (1978). U.R.S.S.: alternatives démocratiques [U.S.S.R.: democratic alternatives] (in French). Paris: Savelli. ISBN 978-2859300258.
- Plyushch, Leonid; Khodorovich, Tatyana (1979). History's carnival: a dissident's autobiography. San Diego: Harcourt Brace Jovanovich. ISBN 978-0151416141.
- Плющ, Леонід (1986). Екзод Тараса Шевченка. Навколо "Москалевої криниці" [Taras Shevchenko's exodus. By "The Muscovite Well"] (in Ukrainian). Edmonton: Canadian Institute of Ukrainian Studies. ISBN 9780920862490.
- Pliouchtch, Léonide (1991). Réponse à Alexandre Soljénitsyne [Response to Aleksandr Solzhenitsyn] (in French). La Tour-d'Aigues: Éditions de l'Aube. ISBN 978-2876780644.
- Pliouchtch, Léonide (1993). Ukraine, à nous l'Europe! [Ukraine, our Europe!] (in French). Monaco: Éditions du Rocher. ISBN 978-2268014128.
- Плющ, Леонід (2006). Його таємниця, або, "Прекрасна ложа" Хвильового [His secret, or Khvylovy's "Beautifil Bed"] (in Ukrainian). Kyiv: Факт. ISBN 9789663591346.

=== Articles and interviews ===
- Plyushch, Leonid (15 April 1976). "A message to all British nurses and to their professional organisations and trade unions from Leonid Plyushch". Nursing Mirror and Midwives Journal. 142 (16): 47–48. PMID 1046216.
- Bukovsky, Vladimir; Plyushch, Leonid (17 February 1977). "An appeal for Vasyl Fedorenko". The New York Review of Books. 24 (2).
- Alexeyeva, Lyudmila; Bukovsky, Vladimir; Amalrik, Andrei; Voikhanskaya, Marina; Plyushch, Leonid; Elina, Emilia; Voronina, Lidia; Bresenden, Yevgeniy (November 1977). "The Orlov tribunal". Index on Censorship. 6 (6): 52–60. doi:10.1080/03064227708532716. S2CID 143045934.
- Plyushch, Leonid (August 1978). "Liberty in the Soviet Union". Quadrant. 22 (8): 4–11.
- Pliouchtch, Léonide (1987). "Les limites de la glasnost" [The limits of glasnost] (PDF, immediate download). Lignes (in French). 1 (1): 44–62. doi:10.3917/lignes0.001.0044. Archived from the original on 25 May 2016.
- Pljusc, Leonid (18 October 1987). "II dissidente sovietico parla del "nuovo corso". L'Urss vista da Leonid Pljusc. Tra speranze e contraddizioni" [The Soviet dissident speaks of "a new course." The USSR seen by Leonid Plyushch. Between hopes and contradictions] (PDF). Bresciaoggi (in Italian). Archived (PDF) from the original on 22 April 2016.
- Pljusc, Leonid (25 April 1989). "Pljusc, dall l'URSS al PSDI" [Plyushch, from the USSR to PSDI]. la Repubblica (in Italian).

== Audiovisual material ==
- Лекція Оксани Забужко та Леоніда Плюща – Як кожен може боротися з тоталітарною пропагандою, частина 1 (The lecture by Oksana Zabuzhko and Leonid Plyushch – How anyone can fight totalitarian propaganga, part 1, 119 min, in Ukrainian) on YouTube
- Лекція Оксани Забужко та Леоніда Плюща – Як кожен може боротися з тоталітарною пропагандою, частина 2 (The lecture by Oksana Zabuzhko and Leonid Plyushch – How anyone can fight totalitarian propaganga, part 2, 31 min, in Ukrainian) on YouTube
