= Alan A. Stone =

American psychiatrist and legal scholar (1929–2022)

- Born: August 15, 1929; Boston, Massachusetts, U.S.
- Died: January 23, 2022 (aged 92); Cambridge, Massachusetts, U.S.
- Occupation: Professor
- Children: 2
- Awards: Guggenheim Fellowship

Academic background
- Education: Harvard University (BS); Yale University (MD)

Academic work
- Discipline: Law, psychiatry
- Institutions: Harvard University
- Main interests: Ethics, Violence, Mental health
- Notable works: Law, Psychiatry, and Morality
- Website: Faculty page

Alan Abraham Stone (August 15, 1929 – January 23, 2022) was an American psychiatrist who was the Touroff-Glueck Professor of Law and Psychiatry Emeritus at Harvard Law School. His writing and teaching has focused on professional medical ethics, issues at the intersection of law and psychiatry, and the topic of violence in both law and in psychiatry. Stone served as president of the American Psychiatric Association. He also served for a number of years as the film critic for the Boston Review.

== Biography ==
Stone was born on August 15, 1929, in Boston, Massachusetts, to Julius and Betty Stone. His parents were both from Jewish-Lithuanian families. Julius Stone was a lawyer, and later a judge.

He graduated from Harvard College in 1950, where he majored in psychology and played on the Varsity Football team. He studied at the Boston Psychoanalytic Institute and earned his M.D. from Yale Medical School in 1955. He pursued his joint interest in the intersection of law, psychology, and psychiatry first as a lecturer at Harvard Law School in 1969, and later through a joint appointment with Harvard Medical School in 1972. In 1978, he was awarded a Guggenheim Fellowship. He later lectured at Stanford before returning to Harvard.

Stone married Sue Smart, with whom he had three children, Karen, David, and Douglas. Karen died in 1988, and Sue died in 1996. He was later romantically involved with Laura Maslow-Armand, to the end of his life, though they never married.

He died from laryngeal cancer on January 23, 2022, at his home, in Cambridge, Massachusetts, at the age of 92.

== Work ==
Stone's work often explores the intersection between psychiatry, ethics, and law. He wrote about decisions in psychotherapy in managed care, and about psychiatric treatment of oppressed minorities such as the Falun Gong and Soviet Jews. In 2002, he asserted that it was time for psychiatry in the Western countries to reconsider accounts of political abuse of psychiatry in the USSR and in China.

Stone believed that Andrei Snezhnevsky was wrongly condemned by critics. According to Stone, one of the first points made by Soviet psychiatrists condemned for unethical political abuse of psychiatry, was that the revolution is the greatest good for the greatest number, the greatest piece of social justice, and the greatest beneficence imaginable in the twentieth century. In the Western view, the ethical compass of Soviet psychiatrists began to wander when they acted in the service of this greatest beneficence.

He was against the use of psychiatry as a political driver, and the use of psychiatric expert testimony. The only time he ever served as an expert psychiatric witness was in mock trials of Shakespeare's Hamlet conducted by United States Supreme Court Justice Anthony Kennedy. The trials were an exercise in the use of insanity defense, and Stone served as prosecution witness, showing that Hamlet was sane when he murdered Polonius.

== Publications ==
Books

- Movies and the Moral Adventure of Life (2007)
- Law, Psychiatry, and Morality: Essays and Analysis (1984)
- The Abnormal Personality Through Literature (1966)

Articles

- The Ethical Boundaries of Forensic Psychiatry: A View from the Ivory Tower (1984)
- A model state law on civil commitment of the mentally ill. (1983)
- Law, science, and psychiatric malpractice: a response to Klerman's indictment of psychoanalytic psychiatry (1990)
