= Expres =

Ukrainian newspaper

Ekspres
- Available in: Ukrainian
- Editor: Ihor Pochynok
- Website: expres.online
- Commercial: Yes

Expres (Ukrainian: Експрес, also transliterated Ekspres or Express) is a Ukrainian language Lviv-based, daily broadsheet newspaper founded in 1992. It claims to be the biggest newspaper in Ukraine in Ukrainian in terms of circulation. Its popularity is based in Western Ukraine.

According to Ekspres employees and IFEX, Ekspres has been subjected to intimidation by the Judicial system of Ukraine and the Ukrainian police in the period between 2010 and 2013. In February 2012 the International Press Institute "condemned alleged attempts by local officials to gag Ekspres". The Ministry of Revenues and Duties denied such allegations in August 2013.

The newspaper's editorial office was shot at three times in 2009.

== Geographic distribution and circulation ==
The editors position the publication as "the leader of the newspaper market in Right-Bank Ukraine", but the newspaper's "target audience" includes both the left-bank Poltava and Chernihiv regions. Separate regional tabs are published for different regions of Ukraine.

According to its editorial staff, Express is the largest Ukrainian-language newspaper in Ukraine (as of 2009, the weekly circulation exceeded 1,200,000 copies). The newspaper is printed at its own publishing complex, Mandarin, not far from Lviv near the village of Ryasne-Ruske. It is distributed by subscription (all-Ukrainian catalog) and through Ukrpress newsstands and its own Interpress network. The newspaper is most actively banned in the western regions; in Kyiv, only the Thursday (weekly) issue is distributed through newsstands.

According to the newspaper, citing the results of a subscription campaign conducted by Ukrposhta, the increase in subscriptions to the print editions of the "Pensioner's Bulletin", "Good Doctor", "Express", "My Confession", "Hostess Recipes", "Hostess Adviser", and "Post-Postup" of the Express media group in the second half of 2012 was over 160,000, and 801,868 subscribers signed up for 2013, which is a record for Ukraine. Almost the same number of people buy the newspaper in retail. The Express newspaper itself has the largest number of subscribers.

According to Ukrposhta, in January–February 2013, almost 30,000 more people subscribed to the Express media group's publications, bringing the total number to 829,999. The number of people who buy the newspaper in retail exceeded this number. As of 2023, the total circulation of the newspaper is 155,000.

== See also ==
- List of newspapers in Ukraine
