= Hryshkivtsi =

Rural settlement in Zhytomyr Oblast, Ukraine

Hryshkivtsi Гришківці
- Rural settlement
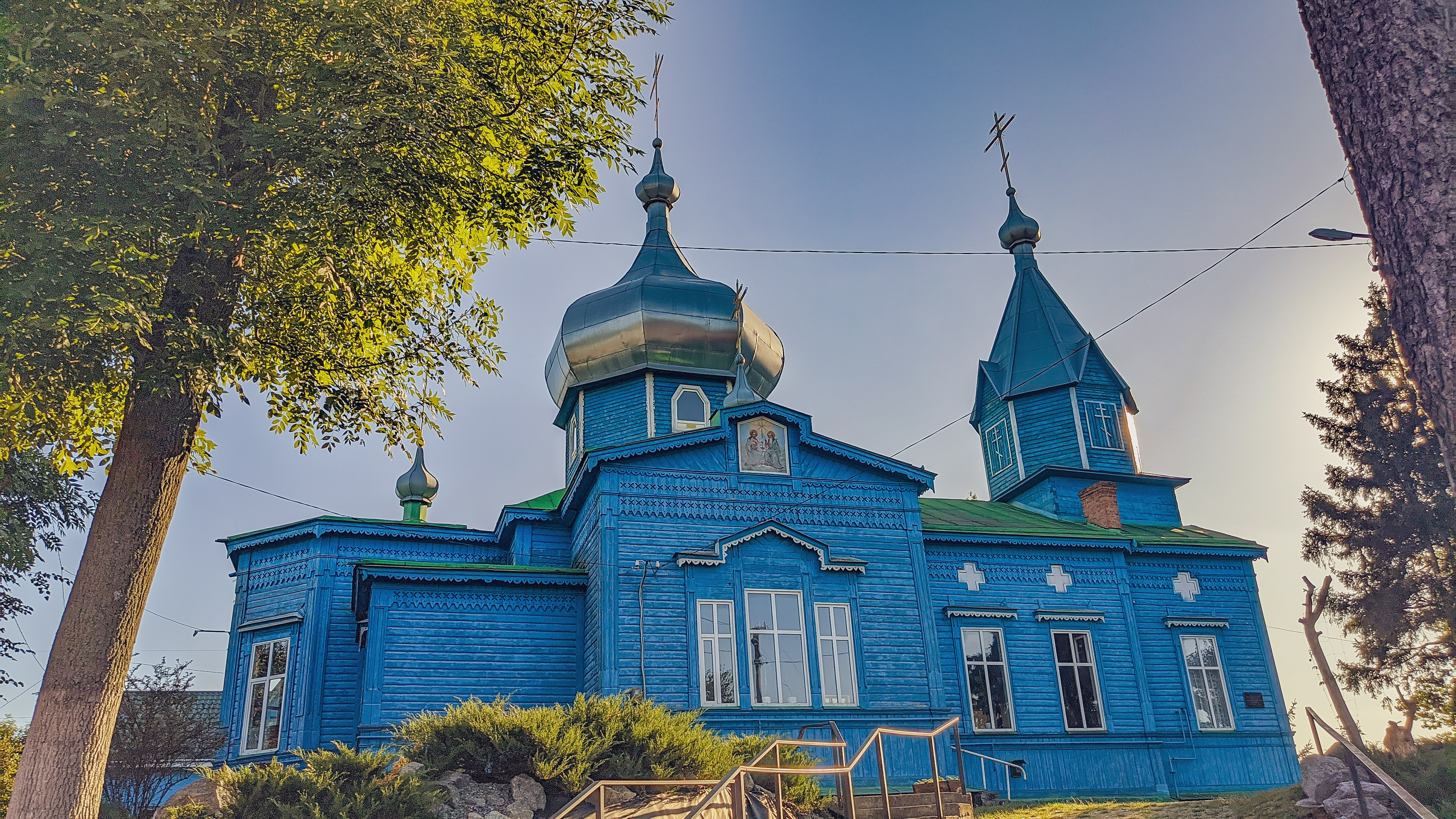
- St. Demetrius Church, 1913

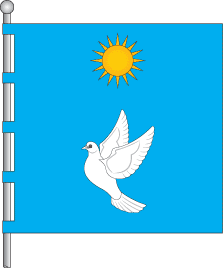
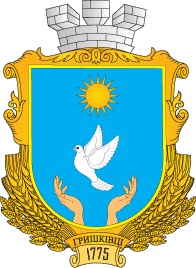
- Flag Coat of arms

- Location in Ukraine Hryshkivtsi (Ukraine)
- Coordinates: 49°56′2″N 28°36′28″E
- Country: Ukraine
- Oblast: Zhytomyr Oblast
- Raion: Berdychiv Raion

Area
  - Total: 6 km^{2} (2.3 sq mi)

Population (2022)
  - Total: 4,099
- Time zone: UTC+2 (EET)
  - Summer (DST): UTC+3 (EEST)

Hryshkivtsi (Ukrainian: Гришківці) is a rural settlement in Berdychiv Raion, Zhytomyr Oblast, Ukraine. Its population is 4,099 (2022 estimate) According to the 2001 census, population was 4,627.

== History ==
Until 26 January 2024, Hryshkivtsi was designated urban-type settlement. On this day, a new law entered into force which abolished this status, and Hryshkivtsi became a rural settlement.
