= Alexander Danilin =

Russian psychotherapist (1960–2026)

- Александр Данилин
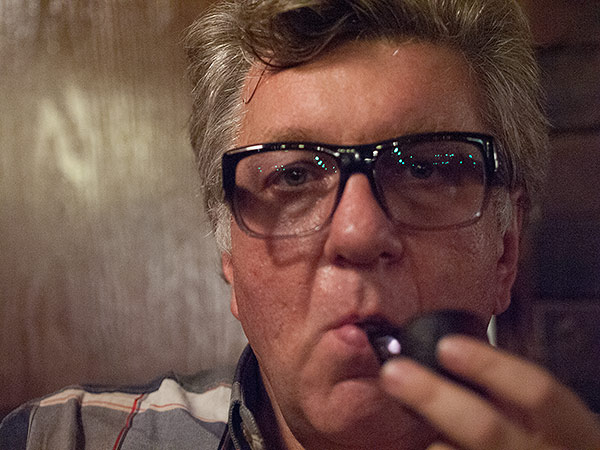
- Danilin in 2012
- Born: 12 March 1960
- Died: 14 August 2026 (aged 66); Egypt
- Medical career
- Profession: Psychiatrist, narcologist, writer
- Field: Psychiatry, narcology

Alexander Gennadievich Danilin (Russian: Александр Геннадиевич Данилин; 12 March 1960 – 14 August 2026) was a Russian psychotherapist, psychiatrist, and physician-narcologist. He was the author of ten books, numerous articles, lectures and trainings on addiction psychology and existential psychotherapy.

From 2003, Danilin was an anchorman of radio program Silver Threads (Serebryanye Niti) that is broadcast by Radio Rossii and is dedicated to the human soul in all its manifestations. A number of the media reported that Danilin was engaged in practical psychotherapy in Moscow clinics for over 20 years. He was a member of the International Psychoanalytical Association and the head of the drug abuse unit in the Moscow drug abuse hospital No 17. The media and websites of wholesale book-selling companies published information that the book by Danilin LSD: Hallucinogens, Psychedelia, and Addiction Phenomenon was withdrawn from the market by the officers of the Federal Drug Control Service of Russia and Federal Security Service of the Russian Federation. Danilin's articles about problems of Russian psychiatry (Dead End, Any Diagnosis in Psychiatry is a Myth, etc.) often caused heated controversy.

Danilin was married and had two sons. He died on August 14, 2026, around 23:55 (GMT+3), at the age of 66.

== Bibliography ==
- Данилин, Александр (2001). LSD: галлюциногены, психоделия и феномен зависимости (PDF). Москва: ЗАО Изд-во Центрполиграф. ISBN 5-227-01464-7.
- Данилин, Александр (2009). Человек зависимый. Москва: Зебра. ISBN 978-5-94663-895-1.
- Данилин, Александр (2008). Прорыв в гениальность. Москва: Вершина. ISBN 978-5-9626-0439-8.
- Данилин, Александр (2010). Поиск видения. Москва: АСТ, Зебра Е. ISBN 978-5-94663-974-3.
- Данилин, Александр (2010). Поиск видения-2. Языческая встреча. Москва: АСТ, Зебра Е. ISBN 978-5-94663-975-0.
- Данилин, Александр (2010). Таблетка от смерти. Москва: Исолог. ISBN 978-5-89516-212-5.
- Данилин, Александр (2010). Ключи к смыслу жизни. Москва: Исолог. ISBN 978-5-9902121-3-8.
- Данилин, Александр (2011). INFERNO: Испытания души. Москва: Исолог. ISBN 978-5-9902121-1-4.
- Данилин, Александр (2011). Ключи к смыслу жизни. Москва: Исолог. ISBN 978-5-9902121-6-9.
- Данилин, Александр (2012). Вопросы психотерапевту. Отвечает доктор Александр Данилин + CD. Москва: Исолог. ISBN 978-5-905670-02-2.
