= Yuri Nuller =

Yuri Lvovich Nuller
- Юрий Львович Нуллер
- Born: 28 August 1929; Leningrad, Soviet Union
- Died: 10 November 2003 (aged 74); St Petersburg
- Citizenship: Soviet Union (1929–1991) → Russian Federation (1991–2003)
- Education: First Leningrad Medical Institute
- Known for: study of depression and anxiety
- Scientific career
- Fields: Psychiatry
- Workplaces: Bekhterev Psychoneurological Institute

Yuri Lvovich Nuller (Russian: Ю́рий Льво́вич Ну́ллер) (28 August 1929 – 10 November 2003 in Saint-Petersburg) was a Soviet and Russian psychiatrist and professor. He spent many years investigating the problem of anxiety.

== Early life ==
Yuri's father, Lev Moiseevich Nuller, a Soviet diplomat in France, was recalled from abroad with his family in 1938, arrested and executed by NKVD on 28 July 1941.

== Sentence ==
In 1950 Yuri himself was arrested under the preposterous accusation that he had been recruited by France's secret service at the age of three. He was sentenced to 10 years in camps and freed only in 1955, two years after Stalin's death.

== Education and career ==
Yuri went on with his studies, and in 1959 had graduated from the First Leningrad Medical Institute and started working at Svirsky mental hospital, a former Alexander-Svirsky Monastery and Svirlag concentration camp. After several months' work he became a head of the acute ward, and in two years defended a Ph.D. thesis, "A strategy for clinical trials of antidepressant drugs and its implementation in the trials of chloracizine and phenylethylhydrazine". In 1972 he upheld a thesis for a Doktor nauk degree, "Clinical investigations of antidepressant drugs".

== Legacy ==
As a person, Yuri is remembered for his kindness, morality and superb intellectual qualities that put him in the ranks of Russian intelligentsia. He abstained from visible dissident activities, but befriended some dissidents known in the West. As a psychiatrist, Yuri Nuller was noted for his high professionalism. Novel psychotropic medications were introduced in his clinic, and he strived to create new treatment strategies, aiming primarily to relieve anxiety. His technique was christened a "Diazepam test": high doses of the drug were introduced acutely and the psychiatrist tried to interpret, judging on the changing anxiety level and the symptoms that became more prominent, what may have caused the disorder.

Yuri Nuller had more than 130 publications and became an author of two books. He was a thesis adviser, with two Ph.D. and five doctoral dissertations defended under his supervision. During the last 12 years of his life he was the head of a department at the St. Petersburg V. M. Bekhterev Psychoneurological Research Institute.

== Bibliography ==
- Нуллер Ю.Л. Депрессия и деперсонализация. ("Depression and depersonalisation") -Л., 1981
- Нуллер Ю.Л., Михаленко И.Н. Аффективные психозы. ("Affective psychoses") Л.: Медицина, 1988.
- Nuller, Y.L. (1992). "Affective Disorders in ICD-10: Strengths and Weaknesses". The Bekhterev Review of Psychiatry and Medical Psychology. Washington, DC: American Psychiatric Press. pp. 44–47. ISBN 0-88048-667-8. ISSN 1064-6930.
- Нуллер, Юрий (2008). Структура психических расстройств [The Structure of Mental Disorders] (PDF) (in Russian). Kyiv: Сфера. ISBN 978-966-8782-44-2.
