= Boris Parygin =

Russian academic

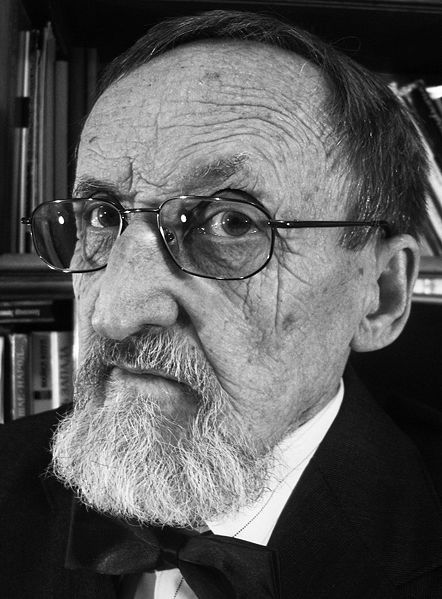
- Boris Parygin St. Petersburg. 2010.
- Born: Boris Dmitrievitch Parygin; 19 June 1930; Leningrad, Soviet Union
- Died: 9 April 2012 (aged 81); Saint Petersburg, Russia

Education
- Education: Saint Petersburg State University

Philosophical work
- Era: 20th-century
- Region: Russian philosophy
- Main interests: social psychology
- Website: Boris Parygin Foundation

Signature
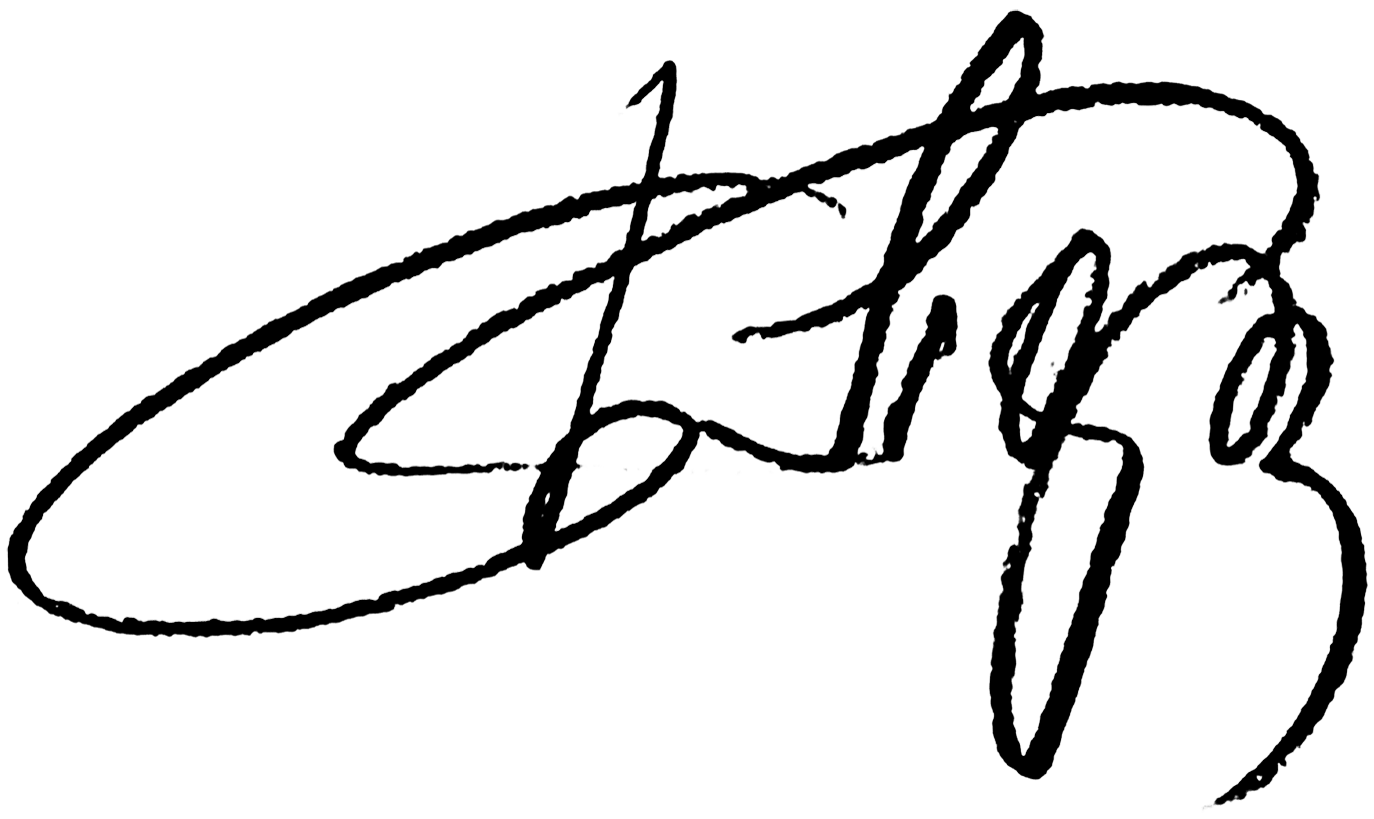

Boris Dmitrievitch Parygin (Russian: Бори́с Дми́триевич Пары́гин; 19 June 1930 – 9 April 2012) was a Soviet and Russian philosopher, sociologist and one of the founders of social psychology and member of a wide range of international academies. Parygin was a specialist in a sphere of philosophical and psychological problems of social psychology – its history, methodology, theory and praxeology.

== Biography ==
Parygin was born in Leningrad, USSR, where he survived the Siege of Leningrad. After school he attended Saint Petersburg State University where he studied philosophy (1948—1953, diploma with distinction). In 1961 he defended a thesis about a problem of the social mood. In 1967 he defended a doctoral thesis, Social Psychology as a science (questions of history, methodology and theory).

== Research ==
After graduation he was teaching philosophy at Saint Petersburg State Pediatric Medical Academy (1957–1962). In 1965, Saint Petersburg State University publishing house had released Parygin's first monograph, Social Psychology as a Science, which became a bibliographical rarity. In 1967, a revised edition of the monograph (15,000 copies) was translated into Czech, Bulgarian, Portuguese and Spanish.

From 1968 Parygin was at the head of the Philosophy Department of Herzen University. There he created the laboratory of the social and psychologic studies and social psychology faculty which was the first one in the Soviet Union. Many first-rate scientists lectured there: Andreeva G. M., Bodalev A. A., Gumilev L. N., Klimov E. A., Lomov B. F., Porshnev B. F., Firsov B. M., Yadov V. A. and others. Аnd books edited by Boris Parygin were published.

In 1971, Parygin's work titled The Basics of Socio-Psychological Theory was published (20,000 printed copies). In his book, Parygin presented the concept of the main social and psychological problems and, first of all, the question of personality and human communication. This book drew a wide response in a scientific sphere of the Soviet Union and abroad. The monograph was republished in Germany (Cologne, 1975, 1982, Berlin, 1975, 1976) and in Japan (Tokyo, 1977).

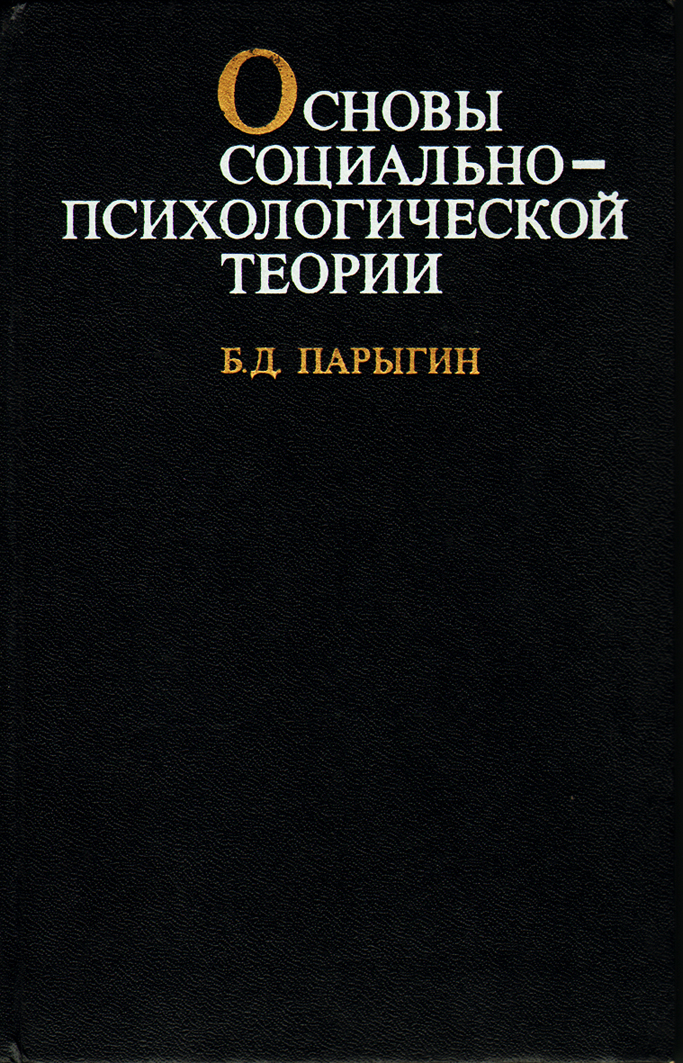
The Basics of Socio-Psychological Theory. 1971. Book cover. (Rus.)

Parygin’s theory grounds on two basic concepts, two psychological phenomena are basic for his reasoning: personality and social interaction (Parygin 1965, 1971, 1999, 2010).

His main assumptions are:

– Personality, on the one hand, has a certain stability and cross-situational constancy, and on the other – it is changeable and fluid, depending on the situation;

– Personality, on the one hand, is the procreation of social interactions in the course of socialization. On the other hand, the relations between personality and social surroundings are dialectical and contradictory, because personality has the greater autonomy, the higher the level of its development is. In social interactions personality pursues its own aims and follows its own value orientations.

Parygin’s attention is focused primarily on the intra-personal contradictions in the course of personality development and on the inter-personal contradictions, which arise in the process of social interaction. His theoretical model of personality involves two different personality schemas: a "static" one and a "dynamic" one.

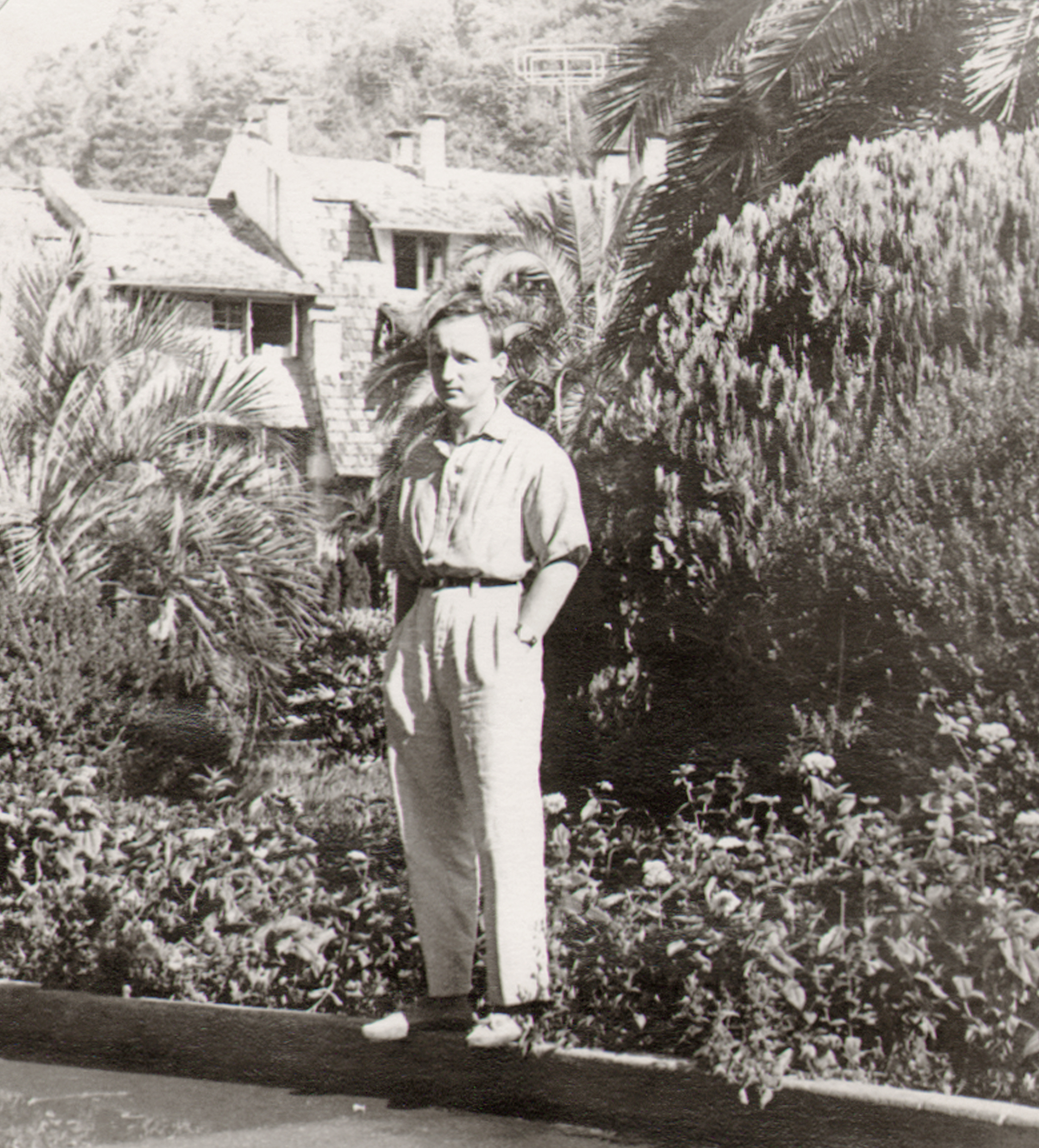
Young Boris Parygin. Old Gagra. Summer 1959

At the meeting of Central Committee of the Communist Party of the Soviet Union (1972), however, Parygin was called a leader of international revisionism of Marxism because of his independent interpretation. Later he was accused of the intention to substitute Marxist philosophy by the Personality psychology. Due to this, he had got a different job in a Social and Economic Problems Institute, where he organized and led the department of socio-psychologic problems of the labor collectives. The results of his work have found reflection in his books The Scientific-Technical Revolution and personality (1978), "Social and psychological climate of the collective" (1981), Social psychology of territorial self-government (1993) and others. Parygin was the head of the Research Committee of a Social Association, coordinated international researches within a Comecon.

Boris Parygin died in St. Petersburg on 9 April 2012. The philosopher was buried at the cemetery in Kirillovskoye, Leningrad Oblast.

== Publications ==
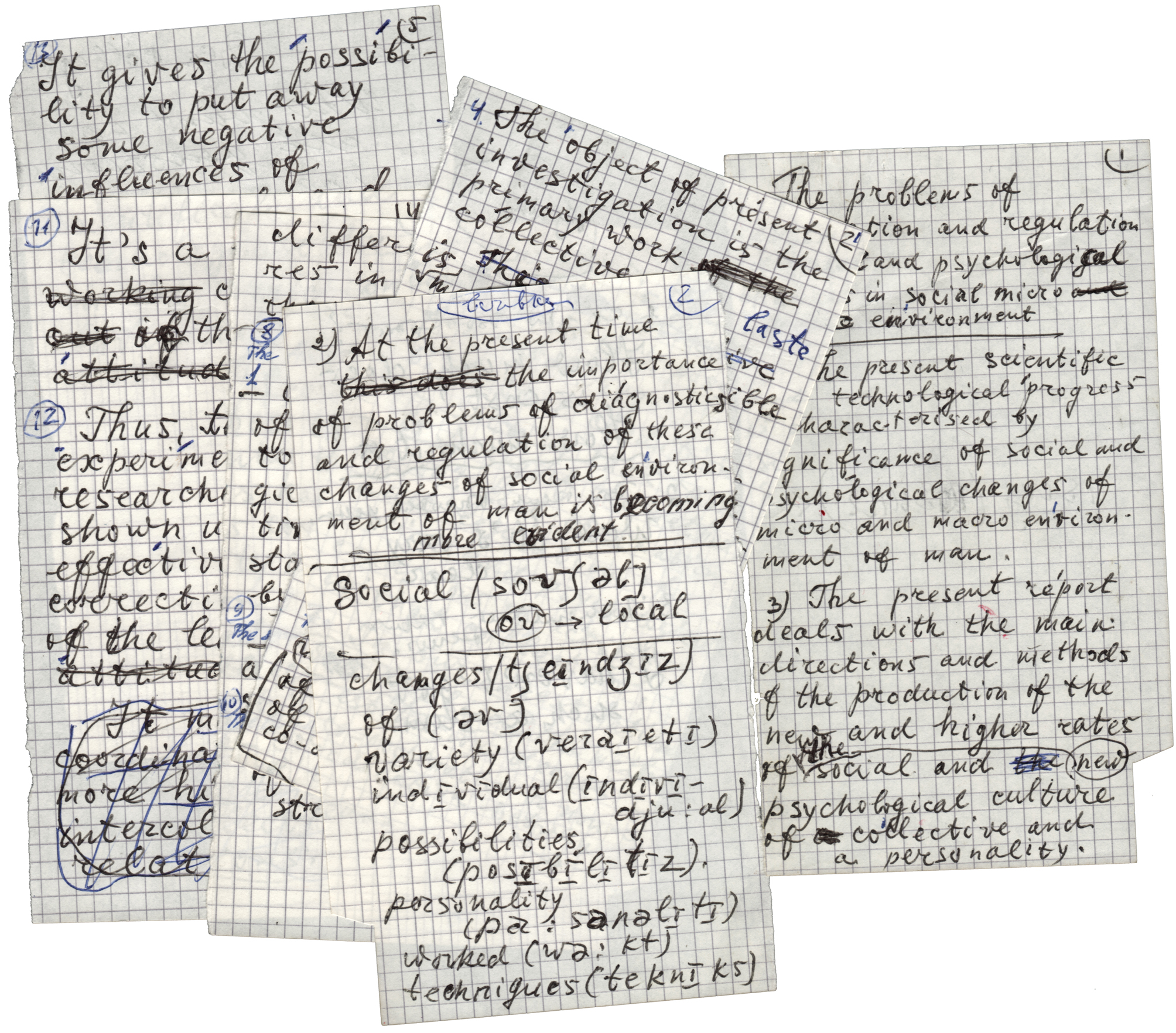
B. Parygin. Text of speech at XI World Congress of Sociology. August 1986. New Delhi

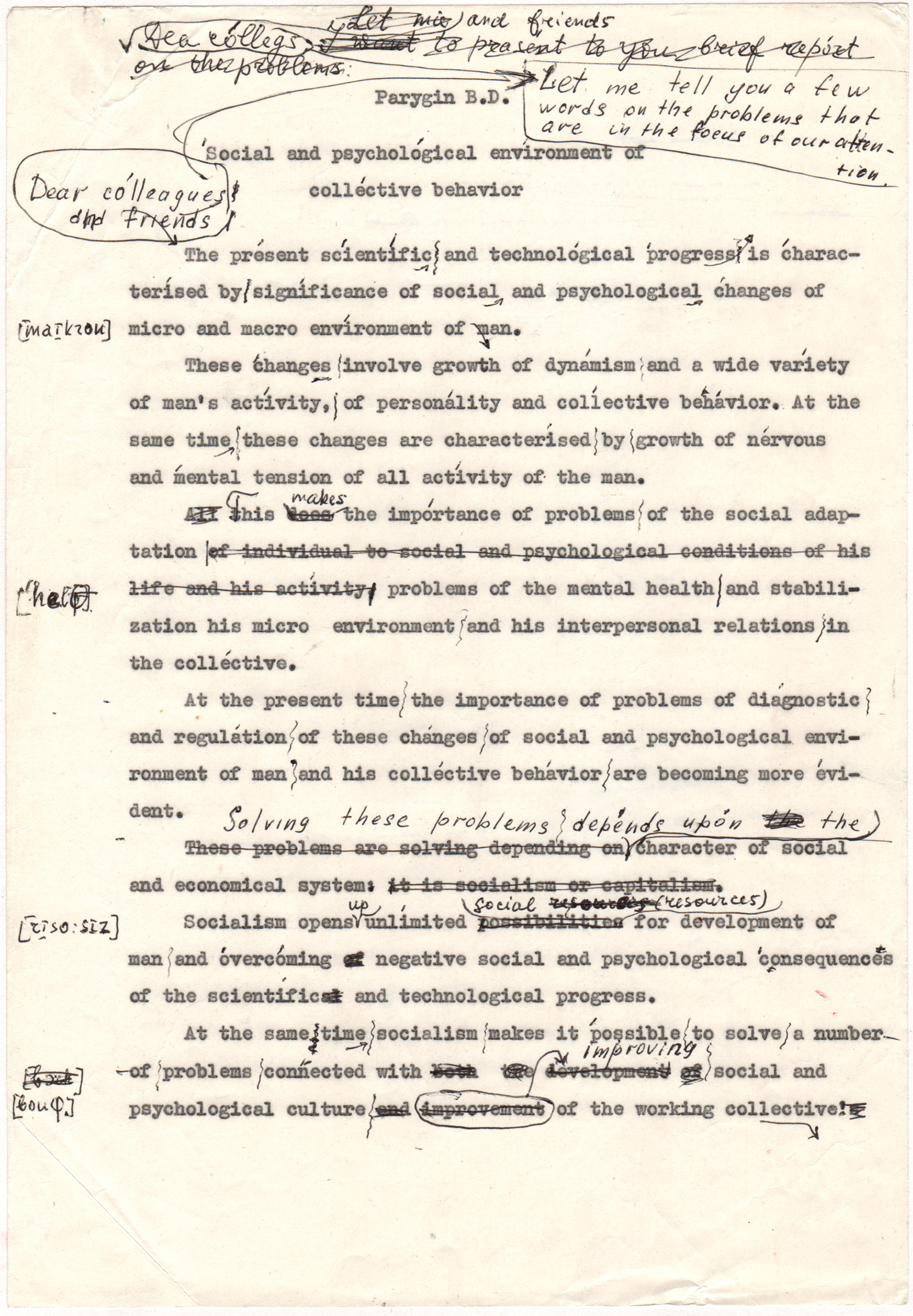
B. Parygin ″Social and psychological environment of collective behavio″. Text for the VII-th General meeting. European Association of Social Psychology. Varna. 1987

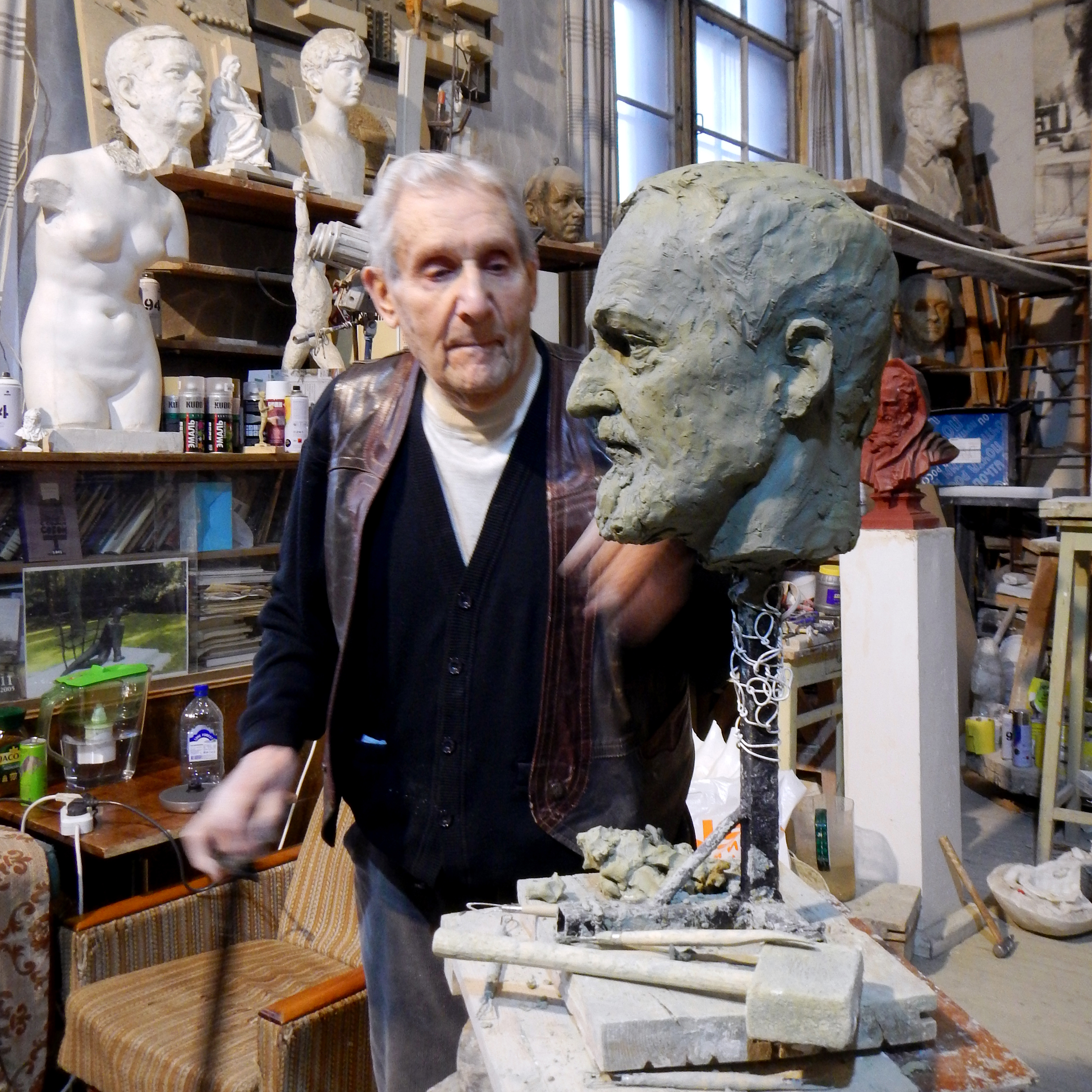
Grigory Yastrebenetsky/ Portrait of Boris Parygin. SPb. 2020

He was the author of 10 prominent monographs and more than 400 articles, which were translated into many foreign languages: English, French, German, Spanish, Chinese, Portuguese, Bulgarian, Czech, Hungarian, Lithuanian, Lettish and others.

=== Monographs ===
- Social Psychology. Sources and Prospects. Saint Petersburg: SPb GUP, 2010. – 533 pp. ISBN 978-5-7621-0543-9 (Rus).
- Social Psychology (study guide). Saint Petersburg: SPb GUP, 2003. – 616 pp. ISBN 5-7621-0250-5 (Rus).
- Anatomy of Communication. Saint Petersburg: Ed. Mikhailova, 1999. – 301 pp. ISBN 5-8016-0046-9 (Rus).
- Social Psychology. Problems of Methodology, History and Theory. Saint Petersburg: SPb GUP, 1999. – 592 pp. ISBN 5-7621-0100-2 (Rus).
- Social Psychology of Territorial Self-Government. Saint Petersburg: SPb GUP, 1993. – 170 pp. ISBN 5-02-027347-3 (Rus).
- Social-Psychological Climate in a Collective. L.: Nauka, 1981. – 192 pp. (Rus).
- Technological Revolution and Personality. Moscow, 1978. – 240 pp. (Rus).
- Technological Revolution and Social Psychology. L.: Znaniye, 1976. – 39 pp. (Rus).
- The Basics of Socio-Psychological Theory. Moscow: Mysl', 1971. – 352 pp. (Rus).
  - Grundlagen der sozialpsychologischen Theorie. Cologne: Pahl-Rugenstein. 1975. – 265 pp. ISBN 3-7609-0186-7 (in German).
  - Grundlagen der sozialpsychologischen Theorie. – (1. Aufl.). Berlin: Deutscher Verlag der Wissenschaften, 1975.— 264 pp.
  - Grundlagen der sozialpsychologischen Theorie. Berlin: VEB. 1976. – 266 pp.(in German).
  - 社会心理学原論, 海外名著選〈76〉. 明治図書出版. 1977. – 281 pp. (in Japanese).
  - Grundlagen der sozialpsychologischen Theorie. Cologne: Pahl-Rugenstein Verlag. 1982. – 264 pp. ISBN 3-7609-0186-7 (in German).
- Public Mood. Moscow: Mysl'. 1966. – 328 pp. (Rus).
- Social Psychology as a Science. L.: Saint Petersburg State University. 1965. – 208 pp. (Rus).
  - Social Psychology as a Science (2nd edition corrected and supplemented). L.: Lenizdat, 1967. – 264 pp. (Rus).
  - La psicologia social como ciencia. – Montevideo: Pueblos Unidos. 1967. – 249 pp. (in Spanish).
  - Sociialni psychologie jako veda. Prague. 1968. – 192 pp. (in Czech.).
  - Социалната психология като наука. Sofia. 1968. – 240 pp. (in Bulgarian).
  - A psicologia social como ciência. Rio de Janeiro: Zahar Ed. 1972. – 218 pp. (in Portu.).
- What is Social Psychology. L. 1965. – 39 pp. (Rus).

=== Articles ===
- Опыт ретроспективного видения судьбы социальной психологии // СПб: Вестник СПбГУ. Серия 16. 2011. Выпуск 4. С. 11–17. (Rus).
- Диалогу нет альтернативы // Ленинградская правда. – 1991, 20 апреля. (Rus).
- Advance of science and technology and the problem of self-realization of an individual // Proceedings of the 2nd Finnish-Soviet symposium on personality. – Tampere. – 1983, 14–16 June.
- Климат коллектива как предмет диагностического исследования // Психологический журнал. – 1982. – Том 3, No. 3. (Rus).
- Scientific and technological progress and socio-psychological climate in a scientific collective // Proceedings of the 1st Finnish-Soviet symposium on personality. – Moscow, 1979. S. 18.
- Советский образ жизни как социально-психологическое явление // Вопросы философии. – 1975. – No. 3. (Rus).
- Как найти ключи // Комсомольская правда. – 1974, 29 марта. (Rus).
- Укрощение строптивой. Интервью // Литературная газета. – 1973, 5 декабря. (Rus).
- Социальное настроение как объект исторической науки // История и психология. – М., 1971. (Rus).
- Структура личности // Социальная психология и философия. – Л., 1971. – Вып. No. 1. (Rus).
- О соотношении социального и психологического // Философские науки. – 1967. – No. 6. (Rus).
- К итогам Йенского симпозиума по проблемам социальной психологии // Вопросы психологии. – 1966. – No. 2. (Rus).
- Проблемы социальной психологии // Социальные исследования. – М., 1965. (Rus).
- The subject matter of social psychology // American Psychologist. Vol. 19 (5). May 1964, p. 342-349.
- Общественная психология как социальное явление // Философские науки. – 1964. – No. 6. (Rus).
- On the subject of social psychology // Joint publications research (selected translation abstract) Number: AD0405666. 16 apr.1963. Washington D.C
- Совещание по проблемам социальной психологии // Вопросы психологии. – 1963. – No. 5. (Rus).
- К вопросу о предмете социальной психологии // Вопросы психологии. – 1962. – No. 5. (Rus).
- О психологическом направлении в современной буржуазной социологии и о социальной психологии // Вестник ЛГУ. – 1959. – No. 23. (Rus).
- Ленин об общественных настроениях // Вестник ЛГУ. – No. 17. Сер. Экономика, философия и право. – 1952. – Вып. 3. (Rus).

=== Reviews ===
- Sorokin P. S., Mironenko I. A., Zhuravlev A. L. Boris Parygin' Social Psychology: History and Perspectives // Journal of the History of the Behavioral Sciences. 2025. Vol. 61. No. 1. PMID 39648490 DOI: 10.1002/jhbs.70006
- Парыгин А. Б. Борис Парыгин (наброски по памяти). — Петербургские искусствоведческие тетради, выпуск 71, СПб: АИС, 2022. — С. 103-110.
- Mironenko I. A. Boris Parygin's Personality Social Psychology / JOINT VIRTUAL MEETING CHEIRON AND ESHHS. 9–11 JULY 2020.
- Мироненко И. А., Журавлев А. Л. Эмпирические и прикладные работы в научном творчестве Б. Д. Парыгина (к 90-летию со дня рождения) // Психологический журнал, 2020, Т. 41, No. 4. 46–54.
- Rubén Ardila Pariguin, B.D. La Psicología Social como Ciencia // Revista Interamericana de Psicología / Seccion Libeos. 2019. – С. 228–229.
- Mironenko I. A. Personality as a Social Process: where Peter Giordano Meets Boris Parygin // Integrative Psychological and Behavioral Science, 2018, 52(2), 288—295: doi:10.1007/s12124-018-9417-y
- Журавлев А. Л., Мироненко И. А. Вклад Б. Д. Парыгина в возрождение отечественной социальной психологии (к 85-летию со дня рождения) // Психологический журнал, 2015, No. 5, — С. 117–124. ISSN 0205-9592
- В. А. Кольцова Парыгин Борис Дмитриевич. Персоналии/ История психологии в лицах // Психологический Лексикон. Энциклопедический словарь в шести томах. Редактор-составитель Л. А. Карпенко. Под общей редакцией А. В. Петровского. — М.: Психологический институт имени Л. Г. Щукиной. РАО, 2015. — С. 345.
- Research in Soviet Social Psychology (Recent Research in Psychology)/ Editors: Lloyd H. Strickland; Vladimir P. Trusov; Eugenia Lockwood. – New York: Springer New York, 1986. – 109 p. P. 2, 4, 7. ISBN 1461577470
- Ján Bubelíni Sociálnopsychologická klíma pracovného kolektívu – niektoré teoretické a metodologické otázky // Sociologický Časopis / Czech Sociological Review. – Roč. 22, Čís. 4 (1986). – P. 351–362.
- Цимбалюк В. Д. Рецензия на книгу Б. Д. Парыгина «Социально-психологический климат коллектива», 1981 // Вопросы психологии. С. 163–164.
- Uring, Reet Suhtlemine, informeeritus ja subjektiivne informatiivsus // Nõukogude KOOL. Tallinn. Nr. 11. 1980. – Lk. 17–18.
- Sychev U. V. The Individual and the Microenvironment. Progress Publishers. 1978. – Р. 8, Р. 25, Р. 64.
- H. Priirimä Mõningate sotsiaalpsühholoogiliste momentide arvestamisest õppetöös // Nõukogude KOOL. Tallinn. Nr. 2 Veebruar 1968. – Lk. 86–89.
- Tschacher, G; Kretschmar, A. Konkret-soziologische Forschung in der UdSSR // Deutsche Zeitschrift für Philosophie. – Berlin. Band 14, Ausgabe 8, (1 Jan 1966). – P. 1008.
- Social Psychology // The Current Digest of the Soviet Press. – Pittsburgh: American Association for the Advancement of Slavic Studies. – 1966. Volume 18, Issues 37–52. – S. 13
- И. В. Костикова Обсуждение книги Б. Д. Парыгина «Социальная психология как наука» // Вестник Московского университета/ Философия. – Москва: МГУ. Серия VII. Тома 21–22, 1966. – С. 15, 50–52.
- Асеев В. А., Зотова О. И. Обсуждение книги «Проблемы общественной психологии» // Вопросы психологии. 1966. No. 3.
- Pirojnikoff, Leo A. & Bertone C. M. Some Basic Assumptions of Soviet Psychology. Presented at the Far Western Slavic Conference, University of California, 30 April 1966. – Berkeley. – 1966. – 12 s.
- Parygin B. D. / Technical Translations. – United States Department of Commerce. Volume10. Number 1. 1963. – S. 7
