= Sergei Rubinstein =

Soviet psychologist and philosopher (1889–1960)

- Born: Sergei Leonidovich Rubinstein; 18 June 1889; Odesa, Kherson Governorate, Russian Empire
- Died: 11 January 1960 (aged 70); Moscow, Russian SFSR, Soviet Union
- Known for: Activity theory
- Awards: Stalin Prize

Sergei Leonidovich Rubinstein (Russian: Сергей Леонидович Рубинштейн; 18 June [O.S. 6 June] 1889 – 11 January 1960) was a Soviet psychologist and philosopher and one of the founders of the Marxist tradition in Soviet psychology. The pioneer of distinct tradition of "activity approach" in Soviet and, subsequently, international psychology.

== Life ==
Sergei Leonidovich Rubinstein was born on June 18, 1889, in Odesa to a Jewish family of a prominent local lawyer. Rubinstein studied in Germany from 1909 to 1913 at the universities of Freiburg and Marburg and received his education in philosophy under the guidance of Hermann Cohen and Paul Natorp, the intellectual leaders of the well known Neo-Kantianism in University of Marburg. In 1914 he defended his doctorate in philosophy Eine Studie zum Problem der Methode on the methodological problems, applied specifically to Hegelian philosophy. Additionally he studied natural history, sociology, mathematics, ethics, and aesthetics. Many of his works dating back to the 1910s and 1920s remain unpublished.

In 1921 he became the professor of the department of philosophy and psychology in Novorossiysk University in Odesa. From 1922 to 1930, he was the director of the Odesa Scientific Library, then he worked at the Herzen Leningrad State Pedagogical Institute (1930–1942). Rubinstein was awarded the Stalin Prize of 1941 (awarded in 1942) for his monumental "Principles of Psychology" (1940). From 1948 and up until somewhat after the death of Stalin, in the course of the anti-Semitic campaign in the Soviet Union, Rubinstein was persecuted and was criticised for having a "non-party" approach to science. He was removed from most leadership positions in academia (although he remained a corresponding member of the Academy of Sciences). It was only after the death of Stalin was he able to regain some of his former status. In 1953, he participated in the organization of the first specialized publication of psychology in the Soviet Union, the journal Voprosy Psikhologii. In 1956, Rubinstein was reappointed chairman of the Sector of Psychology at the Institute of Philosophy at the Academy of Sciences of the Soviet Union.

== Psychology ==
Rubinstein laid the foundations of Soviet Marxist psychology with his debut psychological publication of a journal article "Problems of Psychology in Karl Marx's Works" on the terminological and methodological issues in psychology based on the works and intellectual legacy of Karl Marx and Friedrich Engels. This visionary and programmatic paper came out in 1934 and established a few ground principles of psychological research such as:

- The focus on personality as the priority of research in psychological science
- The principle of the unity of consciousness and activity that overcomes the deficiencies of the three dominant philosophies in psychology, namely, introspectionism, behaviorism and the "psychology of spirit" (geisteswissenschaftliche/verstehende Psychologie, in the original German; perhaps, better known as a range of variations of the so-called existential and humanistic psychology)
- The inseparable unity of the subject and object (in the philosophical meaning of the terms).

Rubinstein was also in effect the originator of the entire tradition of psychological research on human activity that ultimately resulted in the proliferation of the so-called activity theory. Unlike this intellectual movement and explicitly in contrast with behaviorism, Rubinstein always insisted on regarding activity as inseparable from consciousness, which is also in a clear opposition to Freudian tradition with its emphasis on the depths of the human psyche and unconscious psychological processes. Thus, Rubinstein is de facto the founder of activity approach in psychology and pedagogy, although the term "activity approach" would not appear until after Rubinstein's death in January, 1960.

== Selected publications ==
- Sergej L. Rubinštejn. Problems of psychology in the works of Karl Marx (pdf). Studies in Soviet Thought (1987) 33: 111. https://doi.org/10.1007/BF01151778 . (Originally published in Sovetskaja psichotechnika, Vol. 7, No. 1, 1934. Translated from Russian by T.J. Blakeley (Boston College) with the editorial help of Alex Kozulin (Boston University). On Rubinštejn's life and career, see Ted Payne, S.L. Rubinštejn and the Philosophical Foundation of Soviet Psychology, Dordrecht, Reidel, 1968.).

See also "Books and Articles by S. L. Rubinstein". In Payne, T.R. (1968). S.L. Rubinstein and the Philosophical Foundations of Soviet Psychology. Dordrecht / New York: D. Reidel / Humanities Press, 1968.
