= Mikhail Gurevich =

Mikhail Gurevich may refer to:

- Mikhail Gurevich (psychiatrist) (1878–1953), Soviet psychiatrist
- Mikhail Gurevich (aircraft designer) (1893–1976), co-founder of the Soviet Mikoyan-and-Gurevich Design Bureau (MiG)
- Mikhail Gurevich (chess player) (born 1956), chess player
- Mikhail Gurevich, Soviet and Russian writer
