= Dima Zicer =

Russian teacher (born 1966)

- Дима Зицер
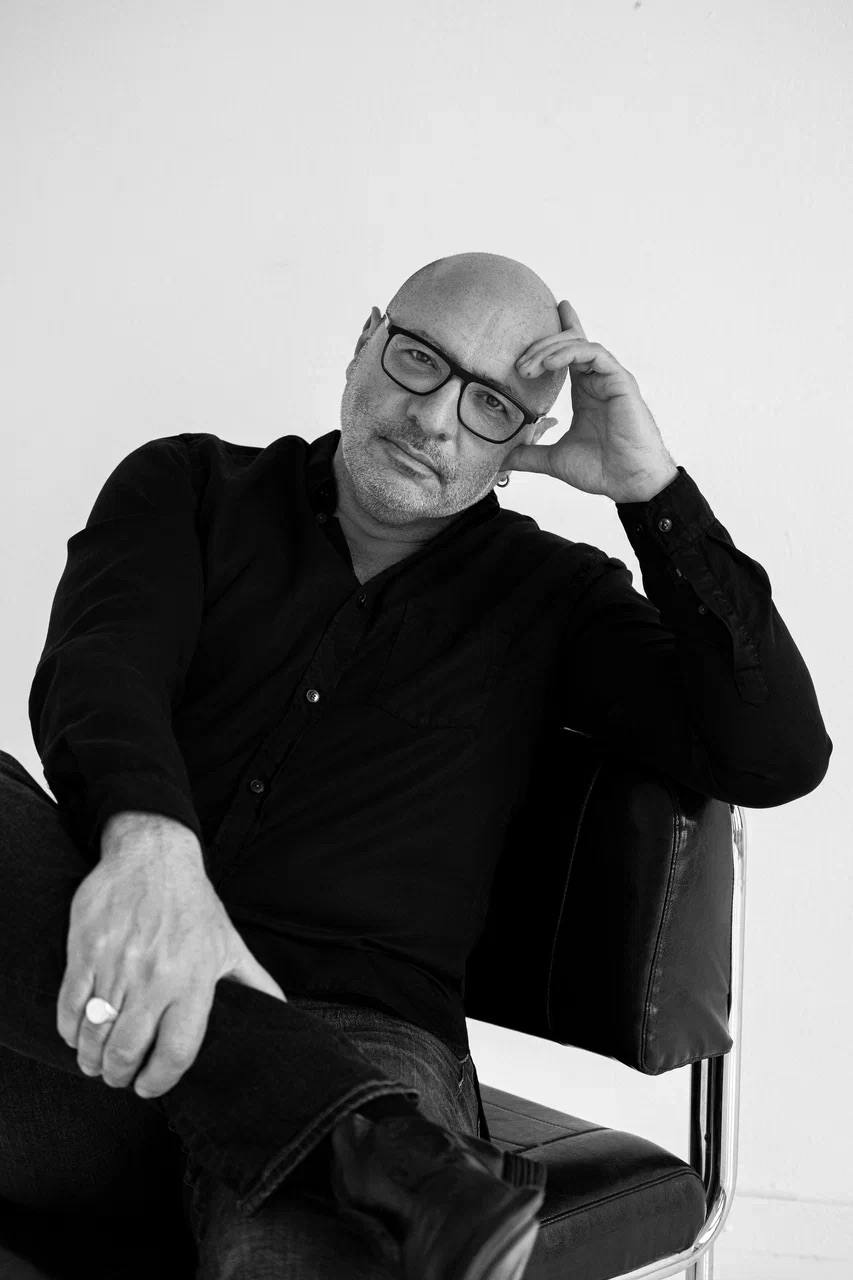
- Dima Zicer in 2022
- Born: Vadim Semenovich Zicer; November 28, 1966 (age 59); Leningrad, Russian SFSR, Soviet Union (now Saint Petersburg, Russia)
- Education: Herzen University (philology), Russian State Institute of Performing Arts (film directing)
- Occupations: educator; author; media figure
- Writing career
- Period: 2014-
- Subjects: education; pedagogy
- Notable work: Practical Pedagogy: The ABCs of Informal Education
- Website: zicerino.com

Vadim Semyonovich Zicer (Russian: Вадим Семёнович Зицер; born 28 November 1966), known as Dima Zicer (Дима Зицер) is an Israeli-Russian educator, pedagogue, theater director, and writer known for his innovative approach to informal education. He founded the Institute for Informal Education and the private school "Orange" (Апельсин). In January 2025, Russia's Justice Ministry labeled Zicer a "foreign agent".

Born in Leningrad, Zicer graduated from Herzen State Pedagogical University with a degree in philology and the Russian State Institute of Performing Arts as a theater director. He holds a Ph.D. in pedagogy.

Zicer advocates for education centered on students' personal interests and believes school systems should prioritize children's freedom, creativity, and critical thinking. He opposes traditional school models based on strict discipline and standardization.

== Biography ==
=== Early life ===
Dima Zicer was born Vadim Semyonovich Zicer on November 28, 1966, in Leningrad (now Saint Petersburg), USSR, to Semyon and Emma Zicer, who had recently moved to the city. Initially named Vadim, he became known as Dima. He developed an early passion for reading and attended multiple schools due to bullying, including antisemitic incidents.

Zicer initially aimed to study theater but was unsuccessful on his first attempt, leading him to enroll at Herzen State Pedagogical University, where he studied philology. After graduation, he pursued theater directing at the Leningrad State Institute of Theatre, Music, and Cinematography (LGITMiK), earning his degree.

=== Career ===
During his studies, Zicer became involved in children's theater and education, creating an innovative summer camp, "Isracampus", where groups were formed based on interests rather than age. This experience inspired his pedagogical methods.

In 1999, Zicer earned his Ph.D. in pedagogy at Herzen University, focusing on the role of freedom in parent-child relationships. He introduced the concept of non-formal education (NE). In 2005, he founded the Institute of Non-Formal Education (INO) and the Apelsin school in St. Petersburg.

Following Russia's invasion of Ukraine in 2022, Zicer moved to Estonia, continuing his pedagogical projects and establishing a new informal-education school, OMA Erakool, emphasizing multilingualism and student autonomy.

=== Public Activity and Views ===
Zicer frequently appears as an educational expert in media, writing articles and previously hosting a radio program on Radio Mayak. He openly condemned Russian invasion of Ukraine, criticized war propaganda targeting children, and faced criminal charges in Russia due to his anti-war position. In 2023, Zicer was charged by Russian authorities for spreading allegedly false information about the Russian army's actions in Ukraine.

Zicer actively advises parents on how to discuss complex issues, such as war, with children, emphasizing openness and honesty to protect children from propaganda and misinformation.

=== Awards ===
- Radiomania Award ("Golden Microphone") for best radio show, 2020.
- "Headliner of the Year" award in Science and Education, 2021.

=== Selected publications ===
Zicer authored numerous books promoting student-centered learning, including Freedom from Education, Love Cannot Be Brought Up, and On the Meaninglessness of Raising Teenagers.
