= Pavlovian session =

The Pavlovian session (Russian: Павловская сессия) was the joint session of the USSR Academy of Sciences and the USSR Academy of Medical Sciences held on June 28 to July 4, 1950. The session was organized by the Soviet Government headed by Joseph Stalin in order to fight Western influences in Russian physiological sciences. During the session, a number of Ivan Pavlov's former students attacked another group of his students (Leon Orbeli, Pyotr Anokhin, Aleksey Speransky, Ivan Beritashvili) whom they accused of deviating from Pavlov's teaching. As the result of this session, Soviet physiology excluded itself from the international scientific community for many years.

== Preceding events ==
The Pavlovian session followed a sequence of Stalin's interferences in academic affairs during the post-war time:

- In 1947, Georgy Aleksandrov asked Stalin to review his textbook for university students entitled "History of West European Philosophy". Stalin criticized the book as an attempt to analyze philosophy from a pro-Western position rather than using the principles of Marxism–Leninism.
- In 1948, Stalin strongly supported Lysenko's work on the inheritance of acquired characteristics in plants which has now been discredited. Lysenko's research was thought to hold the promise of strengthening the Soviet Union's agriculture.
- In 1949, Stalin declared an opposition to cosmopolitism. Great Soviet Encyclopedia defined cosmopolitism as a "reactionary bourgeois ideology of rejecting national traditions and national sovereignty by preaching indifferent relationship to one's country and national culture and advocating the establishment of a 'world government' and 'world citizenship.' "
- In 1949, Stalin commented on the issues of linguistics, in particular he criticized the view that language was a derivative of an economic base. Stalin also stated that "no science can develop and flourish without a battle of opinions, without freedom of criticism."

The interference in physiology, psychology and psychiatry was initiated in the summer of 1949 when Stalin instructed the Minister of Health Yefim Smirnov to hold a session on Pavlov's teachings. On 28 September 1949, on the eve of the 100th anniversary of Pavlov's birth, Yuri Zhdanov reported to Stalin about the "serious trouble" with the development of Pavlov's teaching and put the blame on Orbeli, Beritashvili, and arrested Stern. In replying to this report, Stalin wrote: "In my opinion, the greatest harm to Academician Pavlov's teaching was done by Academician Orbeli... The sooner Orbeli will be exposed and the more thoroughly his monopoly will be eliminated, the better. Beritov and Stern are not so dangerous because they oppose to Pavlov openly and thus facilitate the reprisal of science against these amateurs of science... Now something about the tactics of the struggle against the opponents of Academician Pavlov's theory. At first, it is necessary to stealthily collect Academician Pavlov's supporters, organize them, assign roles, and only after this to gather the session of physiologists... where it will be necessary to give decisive battle to the opponents. Without this, it can fail. Remember: the enemy should be firmly beaten, with reliance on complete success." Georgy Malenkov supervised the organization of the meeting.

== Keynote speeches ==
Four keynote speakers outlined the main topics of the session: Sergey Vavilov, the President of the USSR Academy of the Sciences; Ivan Petrovich Razenkov, the vice-president of the USSR Academy of Medical Sciences; Konstantin Bykov, the Director of the General Physiological Department at the Institute of Experimental Medicine; and Anatoly Grigorievitch Ivanov-Smolenskiy, a psychiatrist.

=== Vavilov's speech ===
In his inaugural address, Sergey Vavilov, praised Stalin and Pavlov for their materialistic approach to the problem of relationship between the material and mental. He stated that Pavlov was a great scientist whom Stalin and the Soviet Government esteemed very highly. Vavilov noted that Soviet physiologists had made great achievements since Pavlov's death, but some did not follow Pavlov's teaching and even attempted a revision of Pavlov's views. Open or concealed opposition to Pavlov's materialistic theory was expected and quite understandable for bourgeois scientists who suggested that Pavlov's theory of conditioned reflexes should be shelved and only his experimental methods might be useful. However, even Soviet scientists did very little to develop important trends suggested by Pavlov. For example, experts who participated in a broad discussion of materialistic linguistics in Pravda did not even mention the role of Pavlov's theory in the study of language. Vavilov explained that the goal of the joint session of physiologists and psychiatrists was to conduct "a critical and self-critical examination of how matters stand with regard to the development of Pavlov's legacy in the Soviet Union". He concluded: "There can be no doubt that it is only a return to Pavlov's road that physiology can be most effective, most beneficial to our people and most worthy of the Stalin epoch of the building of Communism. Glory to Pavlov's genius! Long live the leader of peoples, our great scientist and preceptor in all our major undertakings, Comrade Stalin!"

=== Razenkov's speech ===
Ivan Razenkov spoke after Vavilov. He emphasized the importance of opposing the "reactionary idealist trend" in physiology following the example of Trofim Lysenko who contributed to a "decisive victory" of Ivan Vladimirovich Michurin's teachings over Weismannism-Morganism. Razenkov praised Pavlov's contribution to practical medicine and criticized Pavlov's students for not applying the progressive ideas of Pavlov and Ivan Sechenov to theoretical and practical medicine. He blamed Pavlov's immediate disciples and successors: L.N. Fydorov, the former director of the Institute of Experimental Medicine, Leon Orbeli, the director of the Pavlov Institute of Evolutionary Physiology, Pyotr Anokhin, the head of the Moscow Institute of Physiology, and Aleksey Speransky, the head of the Institute of General and Experimental Pathology. According to Razenkov, these scientists did not fight hard enough to defend Pavlov's materialist theory against the assaults of Western idealist physiologists, such as Sherrington, Lashley and Fulton, and Pavlov's opponents in Russia, such as Beritov. Razenkov also expressed some self-criticism for not conforming with the Party and the Government's expectation of the Academy of Medical Sciences. He informed that the Government had created a new scientific institution, the Institute of Physiology of the Higher Nervous System, to advance Pavlov's teachings, and Pavlov's faithful disciple Konstantin Bykov had been named the director of that institute. Razenkov emphasized the importance of the application of the work conducted by Bykov and his colleagues to clinical practice. He concluded his speech with a praise to the "peerless scientist, Comrade Stalin".

=== Bykov's speech ===
The next keynote speaker, Konstantin Bykov, asserted that medical science must be built on the foundation of correct humanitarian sciences in addition to biology and psychology. He praised the triumph of Michurian biology based on the philosophy of materialism. He also praised the "decisive blow struck at reactionary idealist theories" by Pavlov. Bykov divided the history of physiology and psychology into two periods: idealistic pre-Pavlovian stage and Pavlovian materialistic stage. Bykov condemned the West-European theories of the pre-Pavlovian stage which explained complex nervous phenomena based on idealistic analytical physiology. The authors of these theories failed to recognize class roots of scientific views. According to Bykov, Pavlov made a transition from analytical to synthetic thinking. He discovered a new class of reflexes, conditioned reflexes. He then developed the theory of higher nervous activity. Under the Soviet System, Pavlovian physiology could develop and flourish. However, some of Pavlov's students failed to follow his theory of higher nervous function and instead diverted to irrelevant issues. Even worse, they accepted Western theories. Bykov named Pavlov's disciples who correctly followed the theories of their teacher: Anatoly Ivanov-Smolenskiy and Ezras Asratovich Asratian. Then, he named the ones who deviated from the right path: Orbeli, Anokhin, Speransky and their coworkers. In particular, Orbeli followed idealist sensory theories of Ewald Hering and Wilhelm Wundt and even claimed that they had similarities with Pavlov's materialist theory. Orbeli's associates A.G. Ginetsinskiy and A.V. Lebedinskiy wrote a textbook for physicians "Principles of the Physiology in Man and Animals". in which they treated Pavlov's results as inferior to Western studies. In Anokhin's case, Bykov noted that, although Anoknin had deviated from Pavlov's ideas when Pavlov was still alive, there was still some hope for him and he might correct his mistakes and contribute to Soviet physiology. Bykov praised the contributions of Pavlov's ideas to medicine, emphasized the importance of following the right direction of Pavlov's teachings and resisting false Western theories. Finally, he spoke about Stalin's work that suggested improvement of science through criticism and self-criticism.

=== Ivanov-Smolenskiy's speech ===
In his long speech, Anatoly Ivanov-Smolenskiy reviewed of Pavlov's achievements in the development of the theory of higher nervous activity. According to Ivanov-Smolenskiy, Pavlov's contribution to psychiatry was "of immense value" as opposed to the failure of foreign scientists who did not achieve anything important. Ivanov-Smolenskiy then praised some Russian physiologists and condemned the others. He praised L. A. Andreev and M. K. Petrova as the followers of Pavlov's legacy. He accused Anokhin, Kupalov, and Orbeli. Anokhin was blamed for suggesting that Pavlov's theory was isolated from foreign science and needed improvement, for leaning toward Sherrington's concept of integration, and for criticizing Pavlov's conception of cortical inhibition. Kupalov was accused of distorting Pavlov's conceptualization of reflexes. Ivanov-Smolenskiy characterized Orbeli's views of the relation between subjective experience and objective reality as anti-Pavlovian because — unlike Pavlov who believed that subjective, psychological experience was superimposed on the objective experience of the environment — Orbeli separated the subjective and objective and adhered to psychophysiological parallelism. Orbeli was also blamed for diverging from Pavlov's deterministic position on the mechanisms of higher nervous activity.

== Responses ==
In the sessions that followed the keynote speeches, a number of speakers continued to attack the accused Pavlovians, and the accused confessed to their errors and expressed apologies.

=== Asratian's speech ===
Ezras Asratian spoke on June 29. According to him, several Pavlovians failed the expectations of the Communist Party and the Soviet government. In particular, they failed to pursue research in several important fields, for example cortical localization of functions and fixation of inherited conditioned reflexes in the next generation. They also failed to challenge the anti-Pavlovian theories of Western physiologists.

== Consequence ==
In 1982, M.G. Yaroshevsky, criticizing the Pavlovian session, wrote that, in fact, Ivanov-Smolenskiy and his disciples did nothing but pervert the kernel of Pavlovian teaching, substituting for it a mechanistic view of the brain activity. These so-called scholars of Pavlov emasculated the ground of his theory and extremely damaged the prospects of Soviet science.

A precursor of later abuses in psychiatry in the Soviet Union and the most somber event in the history of Russian-Soviet psychiatry was the so-called 'Joint Session' of the USSR Academy of Medical Sciences and the Board of the All-Union Neurologic and Psychiatric Association, held in the name of Ivan Pavlov in October 1951, considered the matter of several leading neuroscientists and psychiatrists of the time (for example, Grunya Sukhareva, Vasily Gilyarovsky, Raisa Golant, Aleksandr Shmaryan, Mikhail Gurevich) who were charged with practicing 'anti-Pavlovian, anti-Marxist, idealistic, reactionary' science damaging to Soviet psychiatry. These talented psychiatrists had to admit publicly to their wrong beliefs and mistakes and promise to profess only Pavlov's teaching. During the Joint Session, scientists falsely acknowledged their 'wrongdoings' and gave up their beliefs, out of fear. But in the closing speech, the lead author of the policy report Andrei Snezhnevsky stated that they "have not disarmed themselves and continue to remain in the old anti-Pavlovian positions", thereby causing "grave damage to the Soviet scientific and practical psychiatry", and the vice president of the USSR Academy of Medical Sciences accused them that they "diligently fall down to the dirty source of American pseudo-science". The fear and less than noble ambitions of the accusers including Irina Strelchuk, Vasily Banshchikov, Oleg Kerbikov, and Andrei Snezhnevsky were also likely to make them serve in the role of inquisitors. Not surprisingly, many of them were advanced and appointed to leadership positions shortly after the session.

The Joint Session also affected neuroscience in such a way that the best neuroscientists of the time, such as academicians Pyotr Anokhin, Aleksey Speransky, Lina Stern, Ivan Beritashvili, and Leon Orbeli, who headed various scientific directions at that time, were labeled as anti-Pavlov, anti-materialist and reactionaries, and discharged from their positions. These scientists lost their laboratories, and some were subjected to tortures in prisons. The Moscow, Leningrad, Ukrainian, Georgian, and Armenian schools of neuroscience and neurophysiology were damaged, at least for a while. The Joint Session ravaged productive research in neurosciences and psychiatry for years to come. It was pseudoscience that took over.

After the joint meeting of the USSR Academy of Medical Sciences and the USSR Academy of Sciences (Pavlovian Session of 1950), pathophysiology of higher nervous activity was established as a new discipline mandatory for all of the USSR psychiatrists who underwent retraining in accordance with this concept. According to the postulates of pathophysiology of higher nervous activity, the development of all mental disorders was explained in terms of the changed relations between the excitation and inhibition, their interference and different phases of the inhibition. Psychological approaches during diagnosing, treating and explaining the mechanisms of mental disorders have been banned and virtually excluded from the practice of psychiatrists. This ban was based on the ideological concept of labeling all psychological theories of personality, especially psychoanalytic ones, as reactionary and idealistic.

After the joint session of the Academy of Sciences and the Academy of Medical Sciences on June 28 — July 4, 1950 and during the session of the Presidium of the Academy of Medical Sciences and the Board of the All-Union Society of Neuropathologists and Psychiatrists on October 11–15, 1951, the leading role was given to Snezhnevky's school. The 1950 decision to give monopoly over psychiatry to the Pavlovian school of Professor Andrei Snezhnevsky was one of crucial factors of the onset of political psychiatry. The Soviet doctors, under the incentive of Snezhnevsky, devised 'Pavlovian theory of schizophrenia' on the strength of which they diagnosticated this illness in political oppositionists.

== See also ==
- Lysenkoism
- Marxism and Problems of Linguistics
- Politicization of science
- Suppressed research in the Soviet Union
