= Konstantin Bykov =

Soviet physiologist

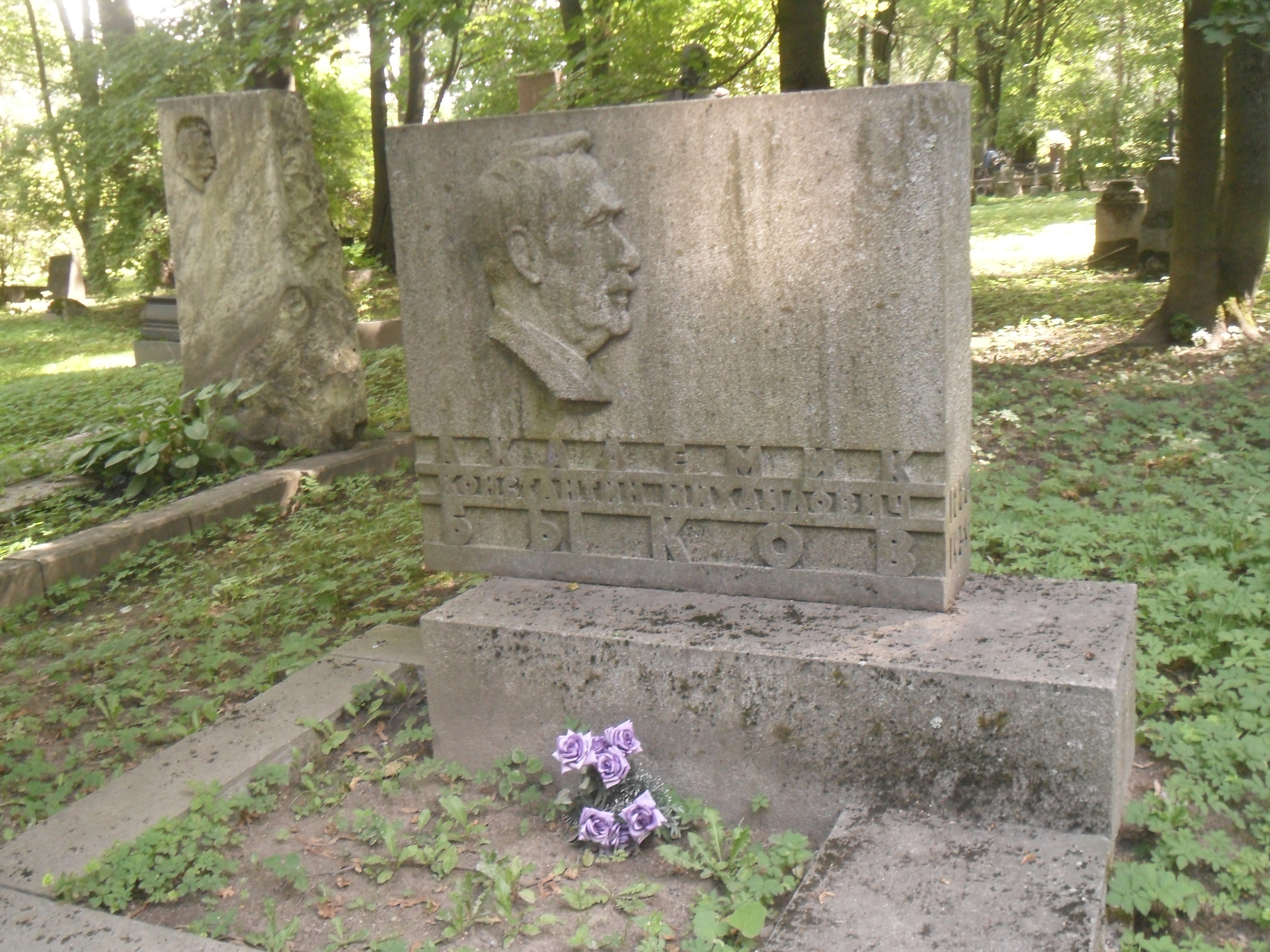
- Grave of Konstantin Bykov at Volkovo Cemetery
- Born: January 20, 1889; Chukhloma, Kostroma Governorate, Russian Empire
- Died: June 13, 1959 (aged 73); Leningrad, Russian SFSR, Soviet Union
- Education: Kazan University
- Scientific career
- Fields: Physiology
- Workplaces: Academy of Sciences of the Soviet Union; USSR Academy of Medical Sciences; Leningrad State Pedagogical University; Leningrad State University
- Academic advisors: Ivan Pavlov

Konstantin Mikhailovich Bykov (Russian: Константин Михайлович Быков; 20 January 1886 – 13 May 1959) was a Russian Soviet physiologist and Academician of the USSR Academy of Medical Sciences.

== Career ==
In 1912 he graduated from Kazan University, and was engaged in scientific and teaching activities at the same university until 1921.

From 1921 to 1950 he worked at the Institute of Experimental Medicine, where from 1921 to 1931 he was under the direct supervision of Ivan Pavlov. From 1943 to 1948 he was head of the scientific research medical institute of the Soviet Navy. Bykov was also a professor at a number of universities in Leningrad such as the Leningrad State University and the Leningrad State Pedagogical Institute.

Bykov was one of the main speakers at the joint session of the Soviet Academy of Sciences and the USSR Academy of Medical Sciences known as the Pavlovian session. The session was organized with the aim of combating the “Western influence” and idealism in Soviet physiology.

From 1950 until his death, Bykov was Director of the Institute of Physiology USSR Academy of Medical Sciences.

He was buried in Leningrad on the Literatorskie bridge of the Volkovo Cemetery.

== Scientific research ==
Konstantin Bykov developed the doctrine of the influence of the cerebral cortex on internal organs and the doctrine of the sensitivity of internal organs. In the field of digestive physiology, he investigated the importance of mechanical stimulation of the gastric glands and studied in detail the features of digestion in humans. In the field of experimental balneology, Bykov collected extensive material justifying the therapeutic effects of mineral water, sulfur springs and radon baths on various body functions.
