= Russia Without Putin =

Russian political card game

Russia Without Putin (Russian: Россия без Путина) is a Russian political card game created in Saint Petersburg in 2018 by Russian opposition politician and civic activist Pavel Chuprunov. Conceived as an indoor format for political discussion and civic education, it uses cards representing Russian political figures and organisations. The game received media attention after police seized its demonstration set during Chuprunov's detention in October 2018; a city court later ordered the set returned. Public tournaments subsequently took place in Saint Petersburg.

== Gameplay and purpose ==
The demonstration set described by Fontanka consisted of about 100 thick cardboard cards divided among four factions: the pro-government groups United Russia and "Putin's Squads", and the opposition groups Open Russia and "Navalny's Headquarters". The cards depicted politicians and public figures, each assigned a strength value, and the faction with the highest total score won.

According to 15min, Chuprunov developed the game as a safer and entertaining way to involve people who were interested in politics but reluctant to participate in opposition activity. Chuprunov told 15min that he chose an indoor board-game format to avoid having to obtain permission for a street event. The sessions combined humour with discussion of political events and opposition proposals.

== History ==
Chuprunov produced the first version in autumn 2018 and invited people to test it through opposition channels on Telegram. In a September 2019 interview with 15min, Chuprunov said that several printing companies had declined to print the cards because of their political content.

On 5 October 2018, police detained Chuprunov and two other Open Russia activists near Smolny in Saint Petersburg. Officers seized a demonstration copy of the game and a rubber mask, took the activists to Police Station No. 76, and charged them under Article 19.3 of the Russian Code of Administrative Offences. The police paperwork explicitly mentioned the Russia Without Putin game.

On 7 October, a district court sentenced Chuprunov to five days of administrative detention and ordered that the seized objects be destroyed after the ruling became final. On 9 October, the Saint Petersburg City Court overturned the destruction order and ordered the objects returned, finding that they were neither prohibited items nor instruments of the offence. Fontanka reported on 1 November that they had not yet been returned. Chuprunov also filed a complaint seeking their return.

In December 2018, the Czech daily Deník N reported that five copies of the game existed at the time and covered the confiscation and court proceedings. In January 2019, RFE/RL outlets covered a second mini-tournament in Saint Petersburg and identified Chuprunov as its organiser and the game's creator.

By September 2019, Chuprunov had organised three tournaments in Saint Petersburg with participants of different ages. 15min reported Chuprunov's account that some participants had subsequently attended political rallies.

The 5 October 2018 detention also formed part of Chuprunov's application no. 24538/19 to the European Court of Human Rights. In December 2025, the Court held in Drokin and Others v. Russia that the arrest and related administrative proceedings disclosed violations of the Convention. The application separately concerned his treatment following a March 2020 protest; the Court awarded Chuprunov €5,000.
