= Pavel Chuprunov =

Russian opposition politician and civic activist (born 1993)

- Павел Чупрунов
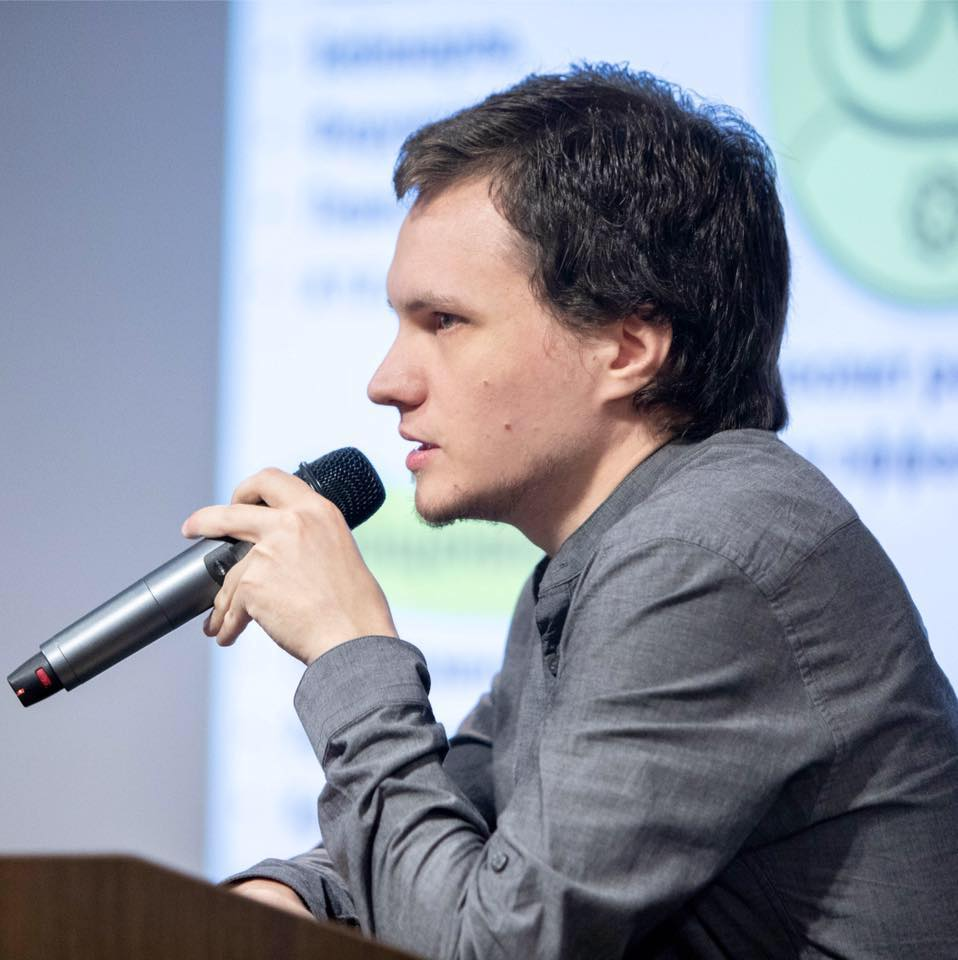
- Chuprunov at the Russia Instead of Putin conference in 2018
- Born: June 28, 1993 (age 33)
- Citizenship: Russian
- Education: Herzen University
- Occupations: Opposition politician and civic activist

Pavel Chuprunov (Russian: Павел Чупрунов; born 28 June 1993) is a Russian opposition politician and civic activist. He attracted attention through litigation over the 2019 municipal election in Saint Petersburg, which resulted in the annulment of the result in the five-seat constituency where he had sought to stand and a repeat election. He has also organised protests and civic projects.

After his detention at a rally in support of Alexei Navalny in January 2021, a police search and subsequent attention from the police anti-extremism unit, Chuprunov moved to Sweden, where he became an asylum seeker. SVT described him as an opposition politician active in local politics who had fled after persecution by Russian police. A Swedish migration court granted him asylum in 2022. He has since continued his political activism in Sweden, including as a representative of the Russian Anti-War Committee in Sweden.

== Education and professional background ==
Candidate information released for the 2019 municipal election states that Chuprunov completed his studies at Herzen University in 2017 and worked as an environmental engineer on sanitary protection-zone projects. In the same year he co-authored a conference paper on the geochemical condition of snow cover along Moskovsky Prospekt in Saint Petersburg.

== Political activism ==
=== Early political activism (2011–2014) ===
In a 2019 interview, Chuprunov said that he became interested in elections and politics after being detained near a Strategy-31 demonstration and served as an election observer in 2011 and 2012. OVD-Info listed him among those detained at the March of Millions in Moscow on 6 May 2012. In the same interview he said that an attempt to register as a candidate in the 2014 municipal election had been unsuccessful.

=== Early projects and police attention (2018) ===
In 2018, Chuprunov developed the satirical political board game Russia Without Putin?, whose demonstration version consisted of about one hundred cards. After a detention, a court ordered the return of the game and a rubber mask seized by police. Fontanka later reported that contacts between Chuprunov and the police anti-extremism unit had begun that autumn and continued in 2019 and 2021.

=== Municipal election and protests (2019) ===
Chuprunov sought to stand in constituency No. 2 of the then Chernaya Rechka municipal district. RFE/RL reported that queues of people whom he described as sham candidates obstructed access to the election commission. The commission issued him a candidate certificate but did not adopt a valid registration decision. A court ordered it to consider his registration, but he was not placed on the ballot. The dispute drew criticism from Central Election Commission chair Ella Pamfilova. The later annulment affected five seats, including one held by a brother of the then speaker of the city legislature.

Süddeutsche Zeitung reported on the registration dispute and Chuprunov's proposals for greater municipal transparency. He and Krasimir Vranski also organised the authorised Piter za Moskvu demonstration, which RFE/RL reported was attended by more than 2,000 people. His campaign and activism in Vesna were featured in a half-hour Arte documentary.

=== Litigation and civic projects (2020) ===
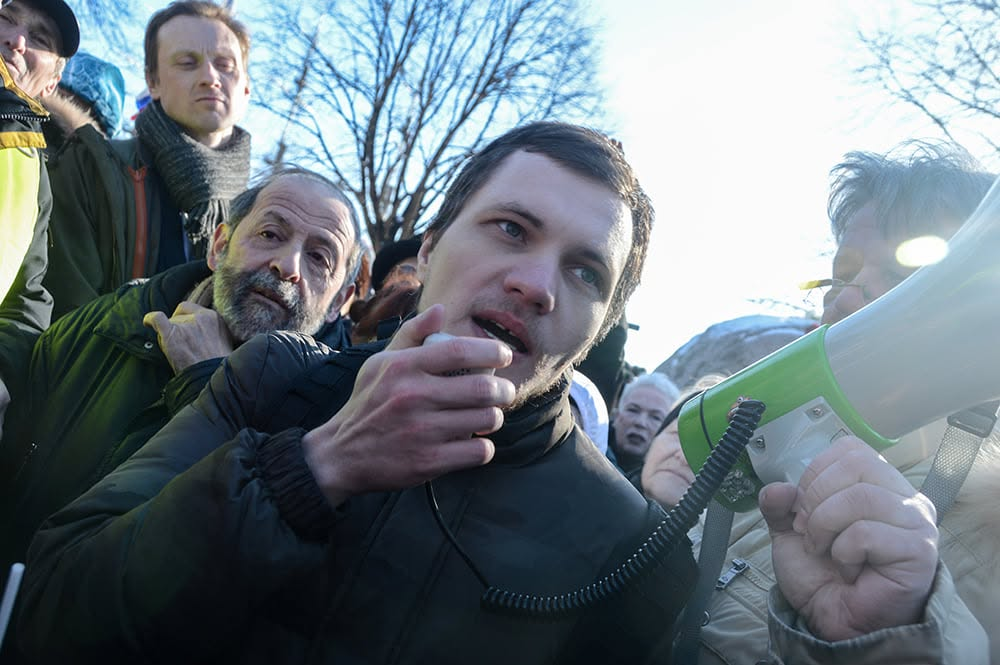
Chuprunov speaking through a megaphone during a memorial march for Boris Nemtsov in Saint Petersburg on 29 February 2020

In January 2020, a court annulled the election result in the five-seat constituency where Chuprunov had sought to stand because the earlier registration decision had not been implemented. That month he launched Uznik Online, a project linking internet users with political prisoners.

In early 2020, he participated in protests against proposed constitutional amendments and was among the initiators of the Saint Petersburg memorial march for Boris Nemtsov. On 15 March he read an appeal opposing the amendments at a protest where at least 22 people were detained. During the COVID-19 pandemic he organised local assistance for elderly and isolated residents; RFE/RL reported that about ten people formed the core group and around thirty participated overall.

During the constitutional vote on 1 July, Chuprunov, a voting member of local election commission No. 1802, was removed from the polling station after asking to observe the count. The commission said that he lacked a negative COVID-19 test. He was later detained over the incident and sentenced to ten days' administrative detention. The city court overturned the decision and released him after six days; the case was later closed, while a separate challenge to his removal from the polling station was dismissed.

That year Chuprunov was also reported as assisting residents in environmental disputes involving the Novosyolki waste facility and the Karabashmed smelter, where regulators found violations after he requested an inspection.

=== Police search, repeat election and departure (2021) ===
Novaya Gazeta described Chuprunov in 2021 as a member of the Saint Petersburg council of Open Russia. The movement dissolved later that year to reduce the risk of prosecution of people associated with it. After his detention at a rally supporting Navalny, an altercation occurred in a police van when an OMON officer tried to take his telephone. Kommersant reported that he then faced possible prosecution under Article 318 of the Russian Criminal Code.

On 6 February, police searched Chuprunov's registered address and seized computer equipment. According to him and the occupants, no search warrant was shown. Police linked coordinated searches at more than 30 addresses to an investigation into roads blocked during the 23 January protest; Kommersant later reported that his parents were called for questioning.

Ahead of the repeat election, Chuprunov led the informal opposition group Komanda Chernoy Rechki, which supported candidates. All five seats went to United Russia candidates.

=== Emigration to Sweden and anti-war activism (2021–2022) ===
Following further attention from the anti-extremism unit, Chuprunov left Russia and requested asylum in Sweden. The Swedish Migration Agency initially rejected Chuprunov's request, saying that he could seek protection from Russian authorities. The decision was subsequently discussed on the opinion pages of Svenska Dagbladet, where the agency's director-general also responded. A migration court reversed the decision and granted him asylum in July 2022.

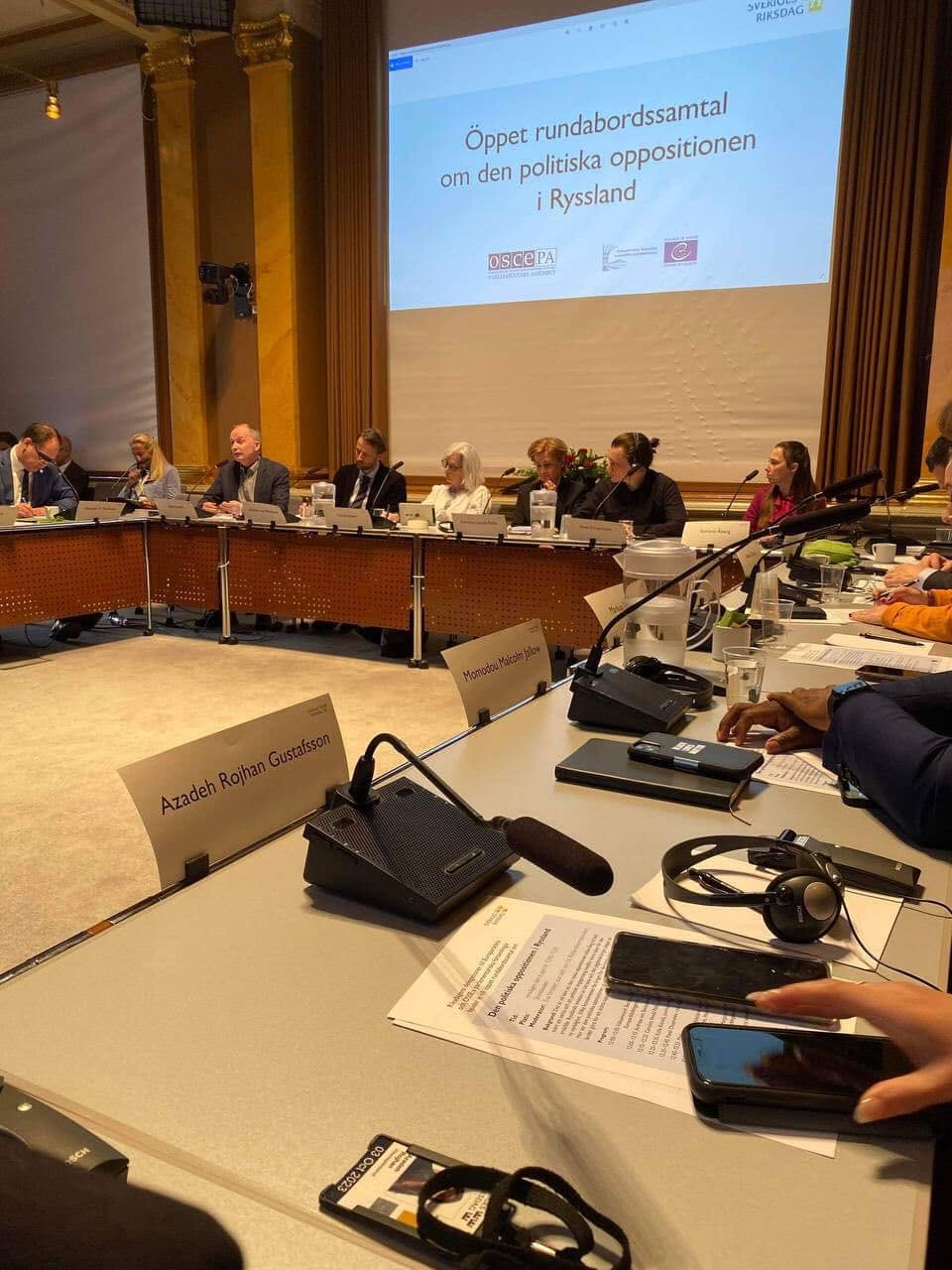
Chuprunov attending a round-table discussion at the Swedish Riksdag in 2022

During 2022, Chuprunov appeared on Sveriges Radio's programme Konflikt about resistance to Putin, was announced as a speaker at an anti-war demonstration outside the Russian embassy, and participated in an open roundtable at the Swedish Riksdag on Russia's political opposition. He presented a report titled Russian opposition during the war with Ukraine 2022. In August he appeared in a Dagens Nyheter report about Russian-speaking people in Sweden and the war.

=== Continued public activism (2023–present) ===
In 2023, Dagsavisen described Chuprunov as one of Vesna's leaders. Vesna had by then been banned in Russia as an extremist organisation. During a visit to Norway, where the movement had been nominated for the Nobel Peace Prize by Bjørnar Moxnes, Chuprunov was interviewed about sanctions and military support for Ukraine; Deutsche Welle also listed Chuprunov among the nominees for the 2023 Nobel Peace Prize. He made further appearances on Sveriges Radio in 2024 and 2025.

In January 2025, Echo Sthlm reported that Chuprunov had been appointed a representative in Sweden for a support function of the Russian Anti-War Committee. The committee's website also listed him as a board member of Russians Against War and a member of Vesna. Russian authorities had previously designated the Swedish organisation undesirable.

In December 2025, the European Court of Human Rights ruled in the joined case Drokin and Others v. Russia, which included Chuprunov's application no. 24538/19 concerning police action connected with protests on 5 October 2018 and 15 March 2020. The court found several Convention violations and awarded him €5,000. In March 2026, the Supreme Court of Russia designated the Russian Anti-War Committee a terrorist organisation and banned its activities in Russia. In August, Yle identified Chuprunov as the committee's representative in Sweden in a report about a detained Russian couple.
