= Social Psychology as a Science =

1965 book by Boris Parygin

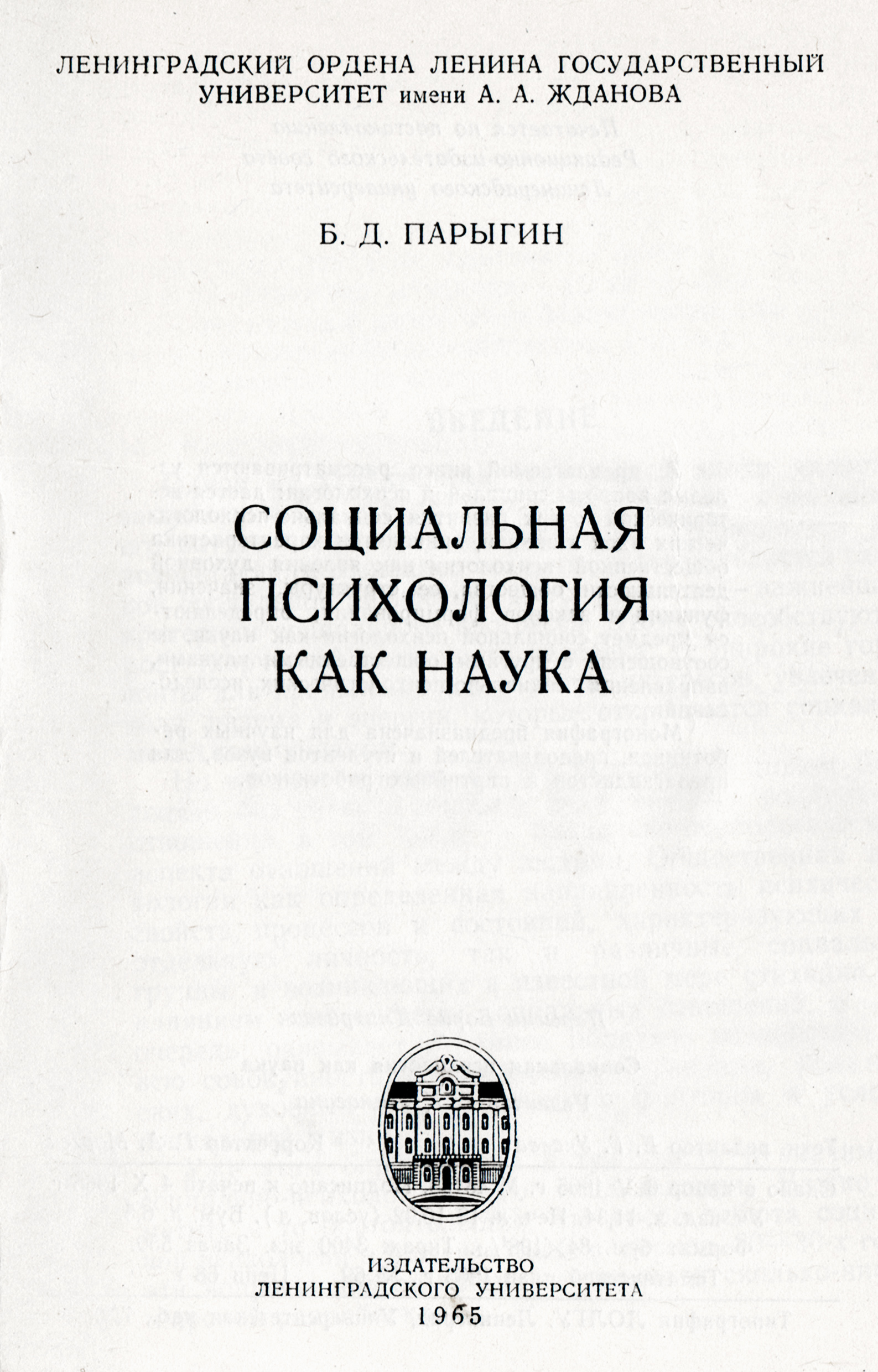
- Title of the first edition
- Author: Boris Parygin
- Language: Russian trans. to Spanish, Portuguese, Czech, and Bulgarian
- Subjects: Social psychology
- Publisher: ЛГУ
- Publication date: 1965
- Publication place: Soviet Union
- Pages: 208

Social Psychology as a Science (Russian: Социальная психология как наука), a monograph by Boris Parygin. The first monograph in social psychology written and published in the USSR in 1965.

== History of creation ==
The book was published by the publishing house of Leningrad State University with a circulation of 3400 copies. That same 1965, Parygin’s pamphlet “What is Social Psychology” was published with a circulation of 5600 copies. The publication of the monograph was preceded by the publication of a number of articles by B. D. Parygin, which offered the author's vision of the place and role of social psychology in the system of humanities and sciences, its subject and specifics in contrast to sociology and general psychology, the features and structural characteristics of its main manifestations.

== Key ideas ==
The book "Social Psychology as a Science" for the first time presented and gave reasons for the author's theory of social psychology as a self-sufficient system of scientific knowledge, its methodology, subject and real-world application, structure, functions and status in the context of humanities and sciences. Parygin writes:

The gist of the subject of social psychology is the whole complex of problems associated with the study of the psychological characteristics of social groups. Videlicet: manifestations of all components of individual psychology — needs, interests, will, feelings, moods, beliefs, habits, hobbies, etc.; forms of mental community and structural and psychological characteristics of various social groups; methods of communication and socio-psychological interaction of individuals within a group and groups among themselves; a mechanism for motivating an individual’s behavior in a group and in the aggregate activities of members of various groups; the psychological mechanism of reflection of the social environment and its effects by members of various social groups and a mass of people; patterns of group and collective behavior; laws of dynamics and the formation of social psychology of various social groups and classes of society. Along with the subject, it is necessary to distinguish the field of socio-psychological research, i.e., the entire social structure of society, the entire system of social relations - economic, political, family, national, etc. It is quite obvious that the study of the psychology of personality and the characteristics of group, collective and mass behavior and communication can and should be considered in all these areas of social practice.

== Value ==
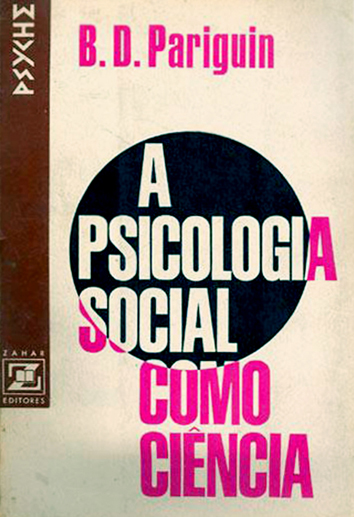
Pariguin B.D. A psicologia social como ciência. 1972. (Portuguese)

The center of attention of the science of social psychology and its highest value was proclaimed a human as a person, with all the wealth of his relationships with other people, understood beyond the declared ideological attitudes, patterns and political dogmas. The publication of this book became a challenge of sorts to a totalitarian ideology based on the orthodox and vulgar-dogmatic interpretation of Marxism. Together with the second monograph published in 1966 — "Public Mood”, Parygin’s books became for Russia a sign of its time in the humanities. The basic provisions and innovations of the work became part of the fundamental research published in 1971, "Fundamentals of socio-psychological theory."

In 1967, on the basis of published books, at a session of the academic council of the faculty of philosophy of LSU, B. D. Parygin defended the first in the USSR doctoral dissertation on social psychology.

Russian psychology is mainly known by the Activity Theory, which was its "mainstream" during the Soviet period. However, Soviet psychological science, along with the "mainstream", included some "peripheral" trends, one of such was the philosophical social psychology by Parygin. Parygin’s first monograph was published in 1965, the last one in 2010. Some of his works, but few, have been translated into foreign languages (Parygin 1964, 1967, 1968, 1975, 1976), but eventually they dropped out from the international science. It should be noted that Parygin was not a pure theoretician. His theoretical developments were born in the process of systematic and long-term empirical research. The theoretical models he proposed were tested with the participation of his students and the staff of the research teams he led at different times. In his empirical and applied studies Parygin primarily addressed the life of real working divisions and departments, engaged in scientific, engineering and technical work. For such real groups, methods of diagnosis, prediction and regulation of the Bsocio-psychological "climate", were developed, which earned good reputation in Soviet Russia (Parygin 1981, 1986).

Among those who influenced Parygin’s worldview are the following names: Gordon Allport, Gustave Le Bon, Karl Marx, Friedrich Engels, George Plekhanov, Jacob Moreno, Sigmund Freud, Arthur Schopenhauer, Nicolai Hartmann, Georges Gurvitch, Talcott Parsons, Erich Fromm, Paul Baran.

== Editions ==
Two years later, in 1967, after the author's refinements and supplements, Parygin's monograph “Social Psychology as a Science” was reprinted in Leningrad with a circulation of 15,000 copies. and translated into a number of languages. We know translations of the book into Czech, Bulgarian, Spanish and Portuguese; re-editions were made in Czechoslovakia (Prague, 1968), Bulgaria (Sofia, 1968), Uruguay (Montevideo, 1967) and Brazil (Rio de Janeiro, 1972).

- Парыгин Б. Д. Социальная психология как наука. — Л.: ЛГУ, 1965. — 208 с. (Russian)
- Парыгин Б. Д. Социальная психология как наука (издание 2-е исправленное и дополненное). — Л.: Лениздат, 1967. — 264 с. (Russian)
- Pariguin B. D. A psicologia social como ciência. Rio de Janeiro: Zahar Ed., 1972. — 218 p. (Portuguese).
- Паригин Б. Д. Социалната психология като наука. София, 1968. — 240 с. (Bulgarian)
- Parygin B. D. Sociialni psychologie jako veda. Praha, 1968. — 192 s.(Czech)
- Paryguin B. D. La psicologia social como ciencia. — Montevideo: Pueblos Unidos, 1967. — 249 p. (Spanish)
