= Herzen University =

University in Saint Petersburg, Russia

The Herzen State Pedagogical University of Russia
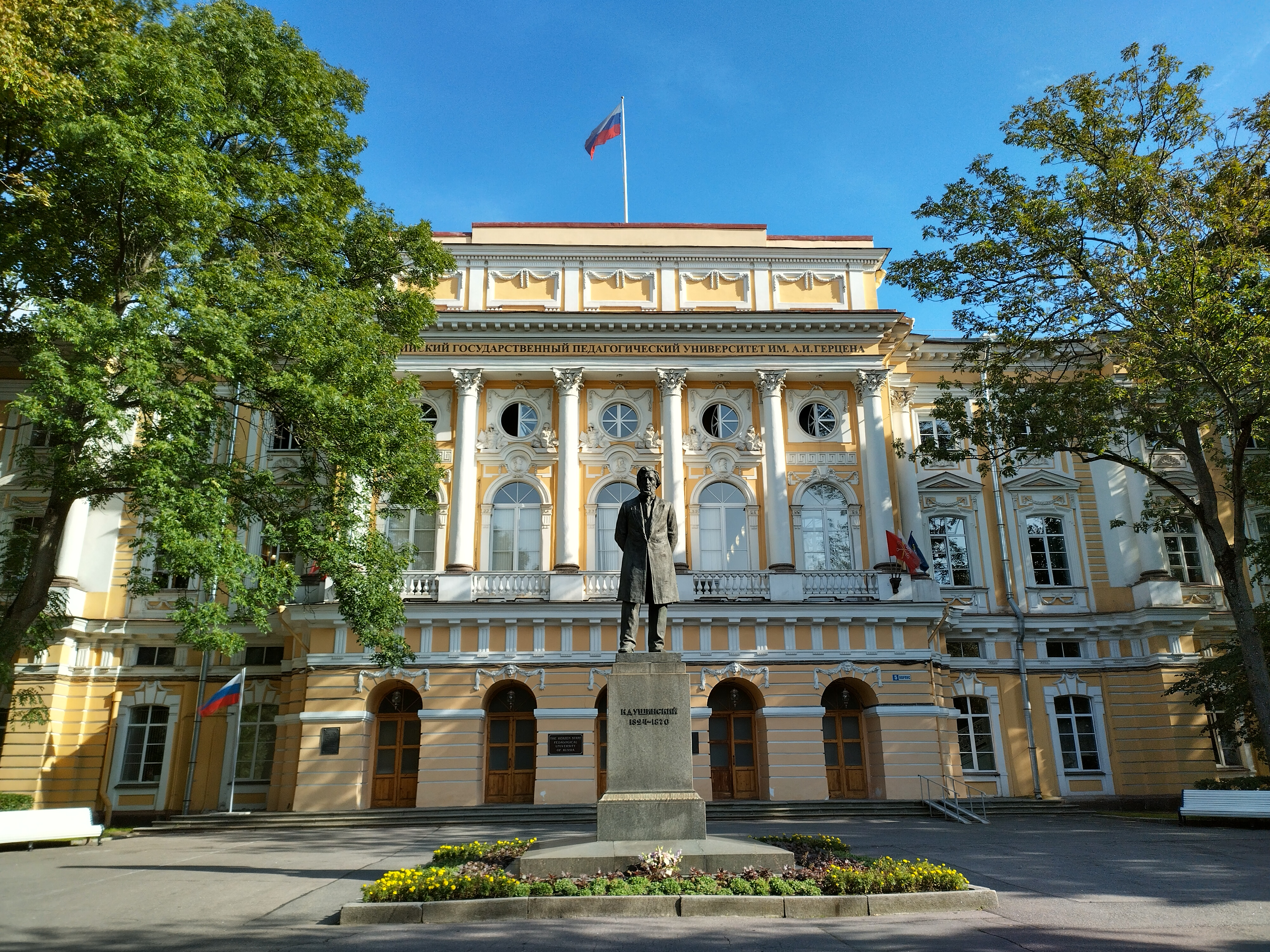
- Main building of Herzen University
- Established: 1797; 229 years ago
- Affiliations: Network Association of Universities "Pedagogical staff of Russia"
- President: Gennady Bordovsky
- Rector: Sergey Tarasov
- Students: 18,000
- Location: Saint Petersburg, Russia; 59°56′2″N 30°19′10″E
- Website: www.herzen.spb.ru

University rankings

Regional – Overall
- QS Emerging Europe and Central Asia: 201-210 (2022)

Herzen University, or formally the Russian State Pedagogical University in the name of A. I. Herzen (Russian: Российский государственный педагогический университет имени А. И. Герцена, romanized: Rossiysky gosudarstvennyy pedagogichesky universitet imeni A. I. Gertsena) is a university in Saint Petersburg, Russia. It was formerly known as the Leningrad State Pedagogical Institute. It is one of the largest universities in Russia, operating 20 faculties and more than 100 departments. Embroidered in its structure are the Institute of Pre-University Courses, the Institute of Continuous Professional Development, and the Pedagogical Research Center. The university is named after the Russian writer and philosopher Alexander Herzen.

== History ==
The university dates its creation to 13 May [O.S. 2 May] 1797, when Emperor Paul I of Russia gave an independent status to the Saint Petersburg Orphanage, or foundling house, established by Ivan Betskoy and put it under the patronage of Empress Maria Feodorovna. The Imperial Foundling House eventually developed into the modern Pedagogical University. Betskoy's humanistic ideas furnished the basic principles of the foundling house. The Imperial Foundling House developed as an educational establishment carrying progressive ideas of upbringing based upon charity and patronage. It mainly took in destitute and deprived children: foundling orphans, disabled children, and children from failed marriages.

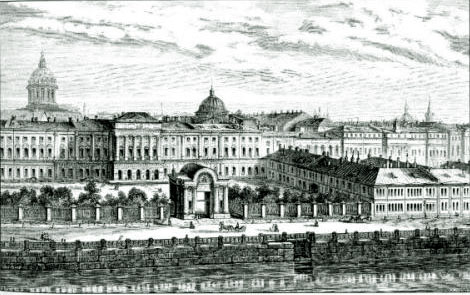
Old view of the Razumovsky Palace compound

In 1837, the "Women's Foundling Institute" was established on the basis of the House's higher classes. After 1885 it was called Nicholas' Foundling House. In 1806, a college for the deaf appeared, the first educational establishment for disabled children in Russia. In 1864, a pedagogical seminary was created for countryside students who were to become teachers of public schools and colleges. Four years later, a women's college was established that granted specialisations of a nurse, village school and kindergarten children. This set the basis for Russian pre-school education. During these years, kindergartens were set up in the district of the foundling house. The graduates of the House worked in the new establishments for children. In the Mariininsky department, a reorganised foundling house, pedagogues like Mikhail Chistyakov worked, the editor-in-chief of "Children's magazine" and the author of books for children, and Vasily Zolotov, an adherent of the "sound method" of teaching reading and writing and an author of textbooks for public colleges.

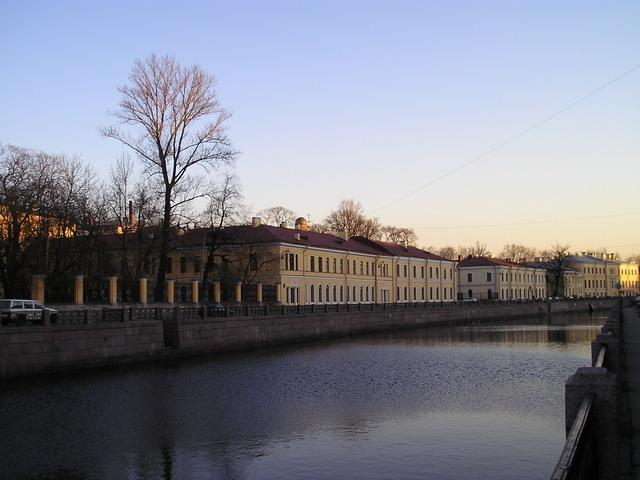
Herzen University as seen from Moika River

In 1918, the consolidation process of Mariinsky department and foundling house-related establishments started. In the same year, the Women's Pedagogical University was renamed the First Pedagogical Institute. Based on the Teachers' Board, the second Pedagogical Institute was established. On 17 October 1918, the third Pedagogical Institute was created. In 1918, the foundling house-related establishments were reorganized into the Pre-school Education Institute and Social Education Institute. In the period between 1922 and 1925, the first, second, and third Pedagogical Universities, the Pre-school education Institute, the Social Education Institute, and the Psychoneurological Institute were merged. The united establishment was named State Leningrad Herzen Pedagogical Institute.

After the 2022 Russian invasion of Ukraine, the university in Krakow in Poland, the University of Freiburg in Germany, and the international university consortium ‘University of the Arctic’ suspended cooperation with the university.

== Notable staff and alumni ==
Over the years, the university has been the workspace for scientists, academicians, and professors.

- Boris Ananev, psychologist
- Aleksandra Antonova (1932–2014), teacher and writer
- Alexander Kushner, poet (graduated from the university)
- Raissa L. Berg, geneticist
- Konstantin Bykov, physiologist
- Pavel Chuprunov (born 1993), Russian opposition politician and civic activist (graduated in 2017)
- Nina Dyakonova, English literature historian
- Efim Etkind, Russian and Western literature historian
- Alexander Fersman, geologist
- Grigorii Fichtenholz, mathematician
- Aleksandr Ginzberg, geologist
- Boris Grekov, historian
- Igor Ivanov, pedagogue
- Orest Khvolson, physicist
- Nikolai Knipovich, zoologist
- Vladimir Komarov, botanist (who later became President of Russian Academy of Sciences)
- Igor Kon, sociologist and sexologist
- Igor Kurchatov, physicist
- Solomon Mikhlin, mathematician
- Rusudana Nikoladze, chemist
- Leon Orbeli, physiologist
- Alexey Parygin, artist, and art theorist
- Boris Parygin, social psychologist
- Albert Pinkevich, pedagogue
- Sergei Rubinstein, psychologist
- Veniamin Semyonov-Tyan-Shansky, geographer
- Yuly Shokalsky, geographer
- Fyodor Skazkin, botanist
- Viktor Sochava, geographer
- Viktor Soroka-Rosinskii, pedagogue
- Vasily Struve, historian
- Aleksandr Volodin, linguist
- Oktyabrina Voronova (1934–1990), poet
- Lev Vygotsky, psychologist
- Yevgeny Tarle, historian
- Thongloun Sisoulith, President of Laos

== International collaboration ==
The university is a member of the University of the Arctic. UArctic is an international cooperative network based in the Circumpolar Arctic region, consisting of more than 200 universities, colleges, and other organizations with an interest in promoting education and research in the Arctic region. The collaboration has been paused after the beginning of the Russo-Ukrainian War in 2022.

== See also ==
- List of higher education and academic institutions in Saint Petersburg
