= Mikhail Gurevich (psychiatrist) =

Mikhail Osipovich Gurevich
- Михаил Осипович Гуревич
- Born: 18 September 1878; Sosnytsia, Chernigov Governorate, Russian Empire
- Died: 16 November 1953 (aged 75); Soviet Union
- Citizenship: Russian (1878–1917); Soviet (1917–1953)
- Education: Moscow University
- Known for: Promoting Soviet child psychiatry and psychoneurology
- Awards: Order of the Red Banner of Labour, honoured worker of science of the RSFSR
- Scientific career
- Fields: Psychiatry
- Workplaces: Moscow University, First Moscow Medical Institute, Second Moscow Medical Institute, USSR Academy of Medical Sciences
- Thesis: On Neurofibrils and Their Changes in Some Pathological Conditions (1908)
- Doctoral advisor: Sergei Sukhanov

Mikhail Osipovich Gurevich (Russian: Михаи́л О́сипович Гуре́вич) (September 18, 1878, the village of Sosnytsia, Chernigov Governorate — November 16, 1953) was a Ukrainian and Soviet psychiatrist, one of leaders of Russian psychoneurology, honoured worker of science of the RSFSR, and a full member of the USSR Academy of Medical Sciences.

== Biography ==
Gurevich was born on 18 September 1878 in the village of Sosnytsia, Chernigov Governorate. In Chernigov, he finished public school as a recipient of a gold medal for academic excellence.

In 1902, he graduated from the medical faculty of the Moscow University and was left as a resident doctor of its psychiatric clinic directed by Vladimir Serbsky since 1900.

For his successes he was encouraged by being sent abroad where he familiarized himself with organization of psychiatric care in various countries and worked in Kraepelin’s clinic in Munich.

In 1904, he began to write his doctoral thesis On Neurofibrils and Their Changes in Some Pathological Conditions under the direction of S.А. Sukhanov, a closest collaborator of Sergey Korsakov, and defended the thesis in 1908.

Between 1909 and 1914, Gurevich continued his anatomoclinic studies in the famous Burashevskay psychiatric colony, in Tver and Saratov. During the First World War, he served as a doctor in army.

From 1918 to 1925, he worked for Pyotr Gannushkin as an assistant and then an assistant professor of the psychiatric clinic at the Moscow University.

In the 1920s, Gurevich along with V.А. Gilyarovsky became a pioneer of Soviet child psychiatry and published the manual Psychopathology of Childhood in 1927. Its second, considerably enlarged edition was published in 1932.

From 1929 to 1936, he was the head of a subdepartment in the Second Moscow Medical Institute. From 1937, he was the head of the psychiatry subdepartment in the First Moscow Medical Institute.

During the Second World War, Gurevich served as a consulting physician for a number of largest evacuation hospitals.

In 1944, he was elected as a full member of the USSR Academy of Medical Sciences.

In 1950 and 1951, Gurevich along with Aleksandr Smaryan and Raisa Golant became the key target of harassment during Pavlovian sessions, including the joint session held by the enlarged panel of the USSR Academy of Medical Sciences and the plenum of the board of the All-Union Society of Neuropathologists and Psychiatrists from 11 to 15 October 1951. The members of the joint session made against Gurevich the accusation that “he hampered the development of domestic psychiatry.” Gurevich believed in these words and began to suffer from delusion of self-accusation, repeating, “What have I done! You know, I ruined psychiatry and all my disciples who followed in my footsteps!” He did not manage to recover from that. He died on 16 November 1953.

Gurevich was a recipient of the Order of the Red Banner of Labour and the author of about 120 significant scientific works, three monographs, and two manuals republished many times.
