= Grigory Yastrebenetsky =

Russian sculptor (1923–2022)

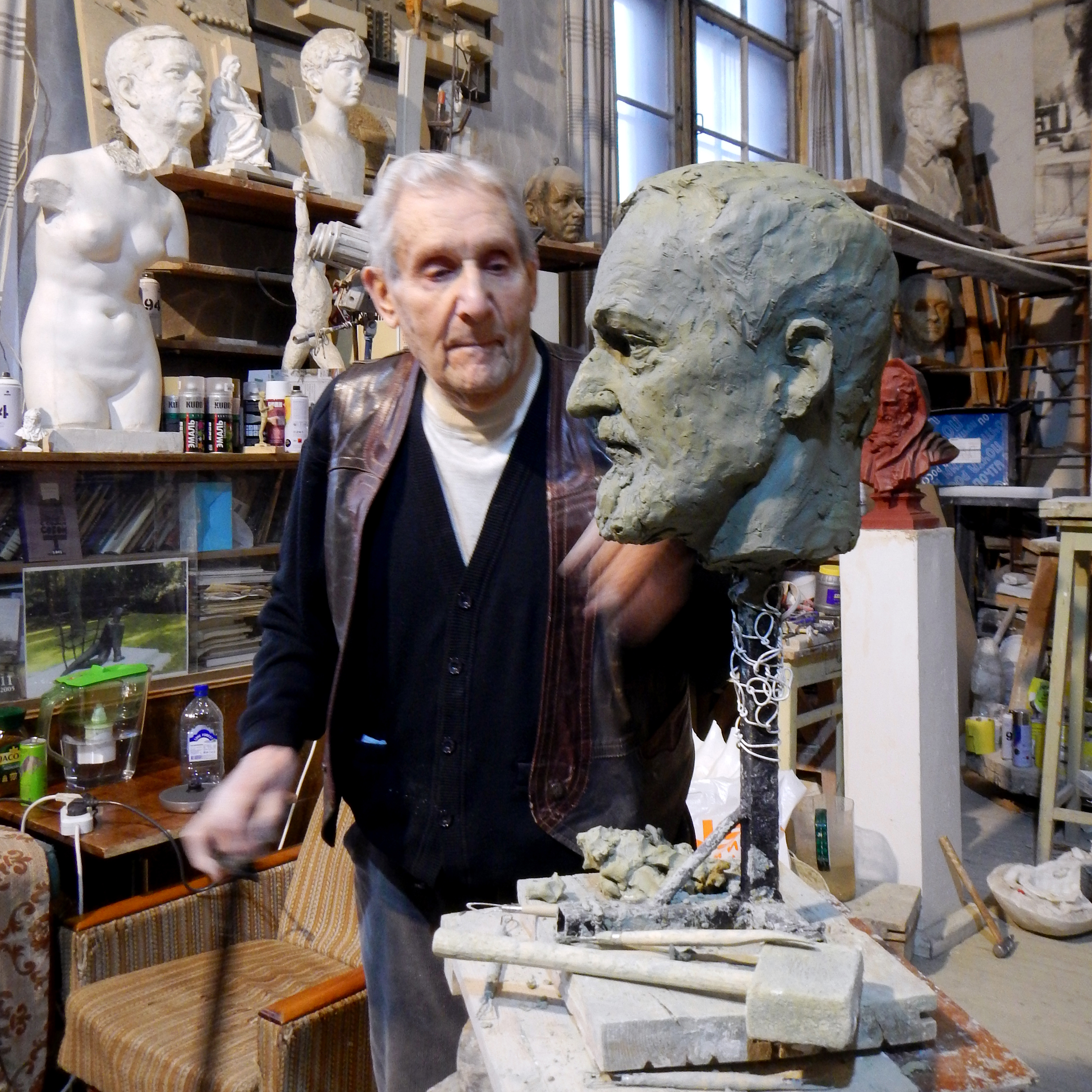
- Yastrebenetsky in 2020
- Born: Grigory Danilovich Yastrebenetsky; 29 October 1923; Baku, Transcaucasian SFSR, USSR
- Died: 18 March 2022 (aged 98); Saint Petersburg, Russia
- Occupation: Sculptor

Grigory Danilovich Yastrebenetsky (29 October 1923 – 18 March 2022) was a Russian sculptor. He served on the Eastern Front in World War II. Yastrebenetsky was honoured with the People's Artist of the RSFSR (1984). He was also a member of the Russian Academy of Arts.

Yastrebenetsky died on 18 March 2022 in Saint Petersburg, at the age of 98.

== Career ==
Yastrebenetsky served in a reserve mortar regiment during the Siege of Leningrad, and was hospitalised in December 1941 with malnutrition. He later served with the 8th Artillery Observation Balloon Division, participating in battles in Narva, Shlisselburg, the Karelian Isthmus and Königsberg.

In 1951, he graduated from the Ilya Repin Academy of Fine Arts. His body of work includes over 250 portraits, and numerous sculptures, monuments and memorial plaques for noted residents of St. Petersburg and the memorial at Neuengamme concentration camp. His works can be found in the collections of the State Russian Museum and the Tretyakov Gallery, and in the collection of the Hermitage Museum.

== Works ==
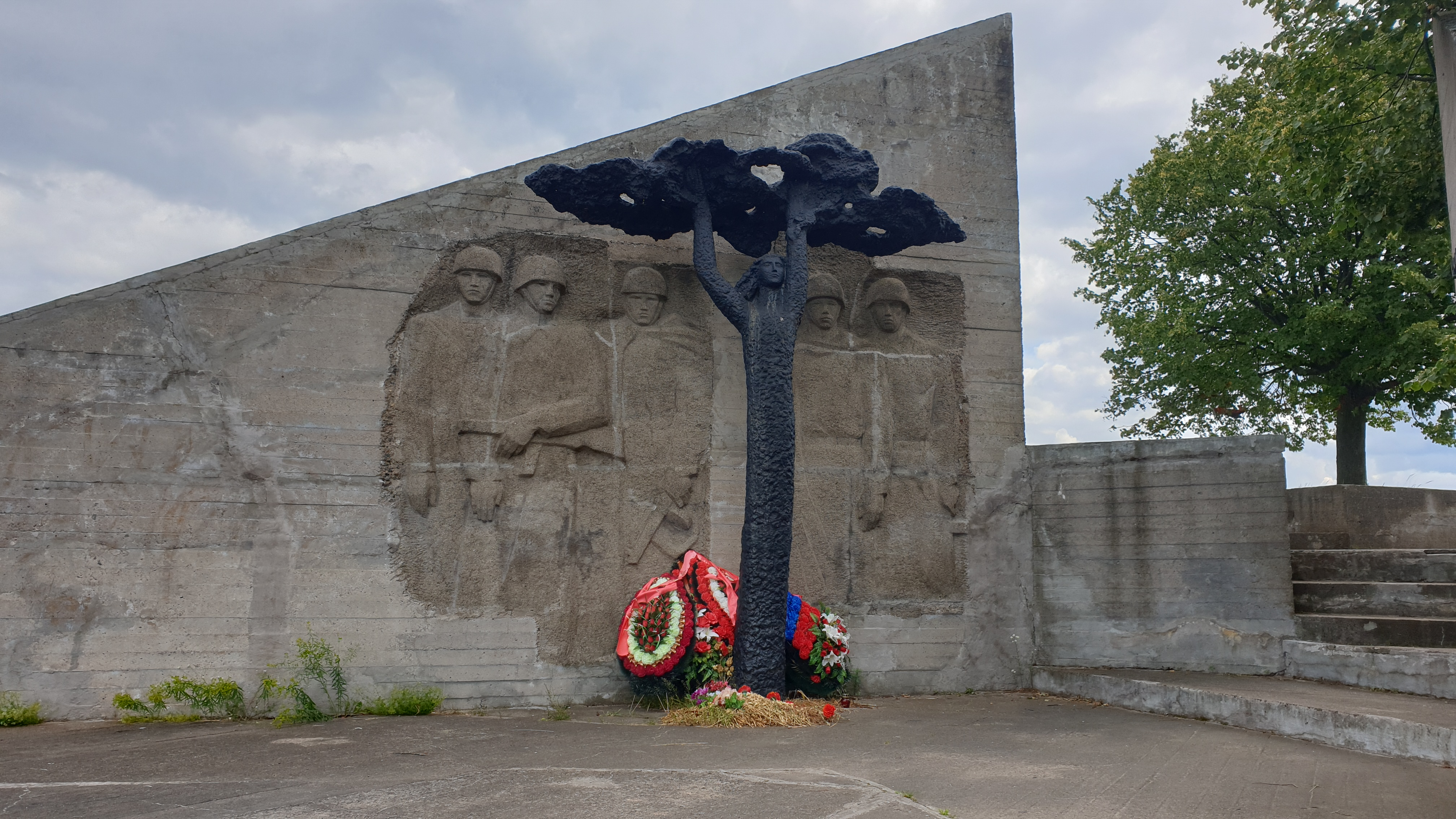
Nameless Height (Hill of Glory) bas-relief and Statue

Yastrebenetsky designed sculptures along the Leningrad defense line, part of the Green Belt of Glory monument complex surrounding Saint Petersburg. Notably the Nameless Height (Hill of Glory), erected in 1968 on the banks of the Neva, where the Red Army prevented the Nazis from crossing the river and grouping with Finnish forces. The monument sits on a man-made mound, 20 metres high, overlooking the confluence of the Neva and Tosna rivers. It consists of a bas-relief depicting five soldiers, behind a figure of a woman in a pose symbolizing the Tree of Life. The memorial's concrete walls are inscribed with lines of poetry and commemorative inscriptions.

The memorial statue at the Oreshek Fortress on Orekhovy Island was erected in 1985, and is dedicated to the soldiers who defended the castle and prevented the Nazis from cutting off the Road of Life across Lake Ladoga, the only supply route to Leningrad. The fortress was defended for 500 days until the siege of the fortress was lifted during Operation Iskra. The ruins of a church inside the fortress were transformed into the memorial.

== Gallery ==
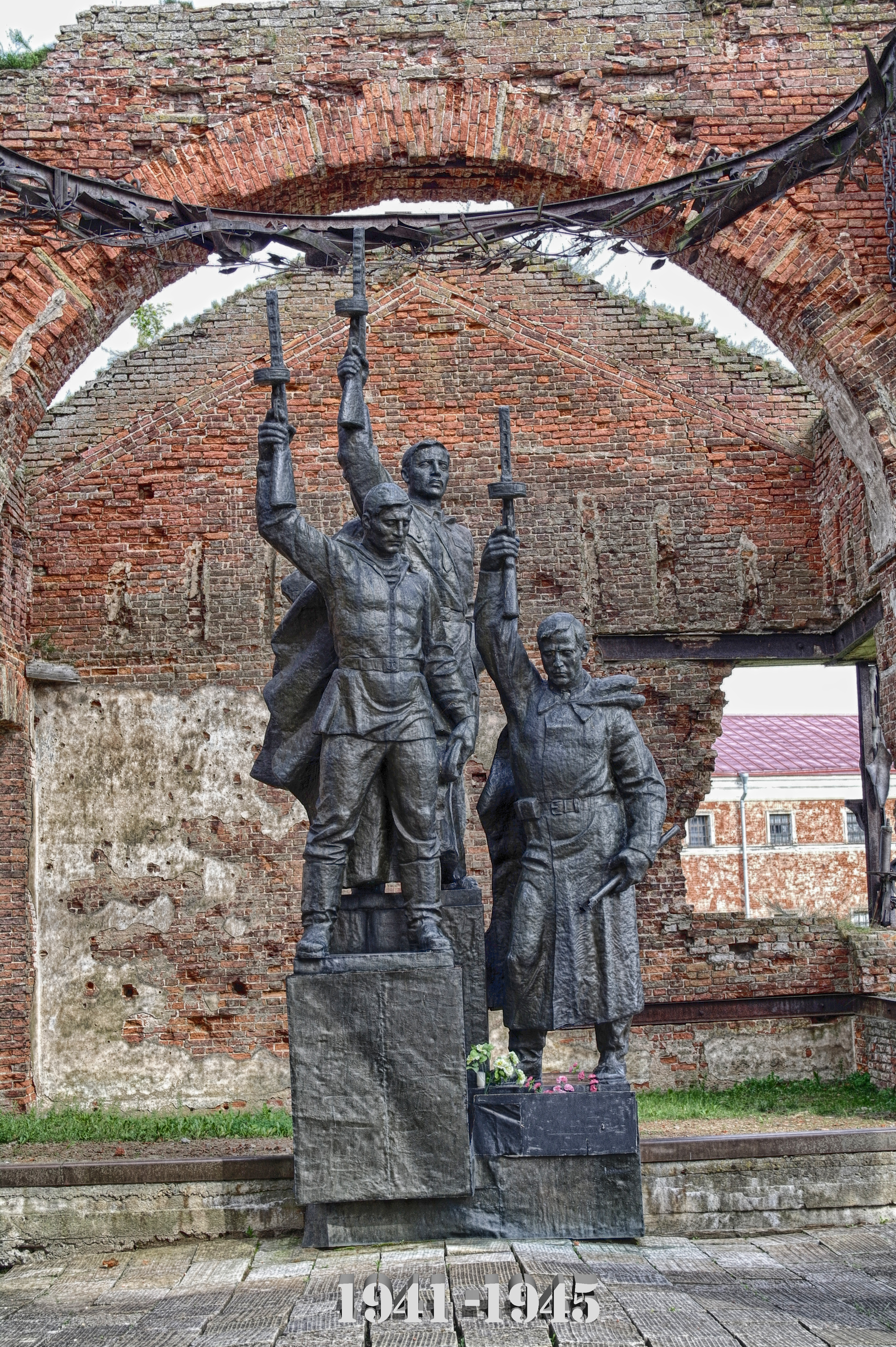
Monument to the defenders of Oreshek Fortress during World War II

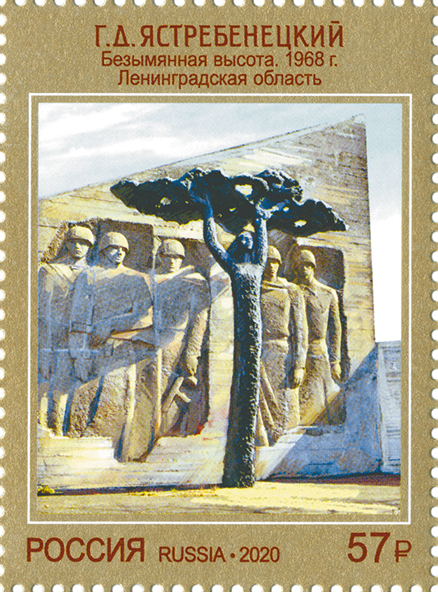
Russia stamp 2020 № 2645

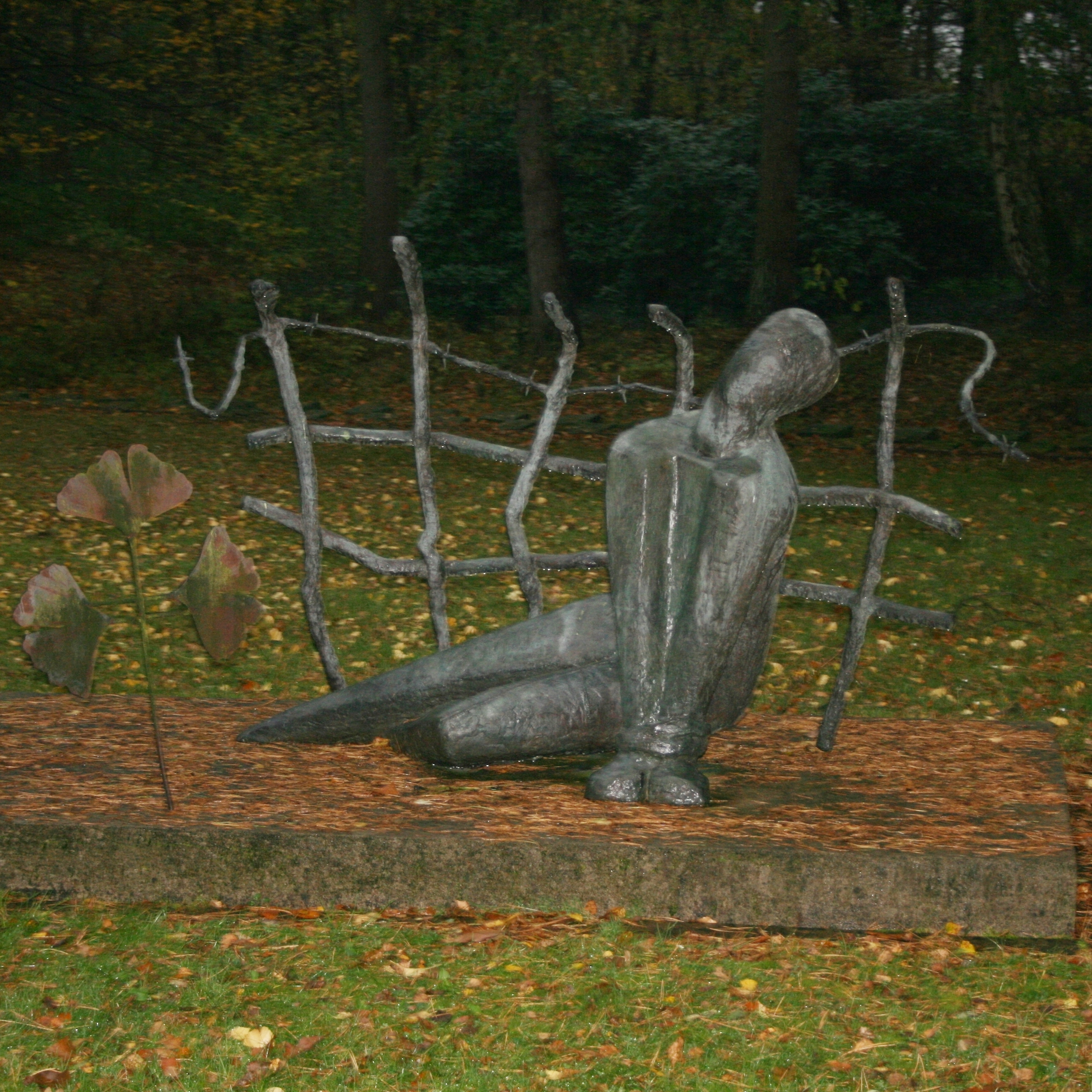
Memorial to Soviet prisoners of war at Bergedorf Cemetery, 2002
