= Voprosy Psikhologii =

- Discipline: Psychology, psychotherapy
- Language: Russian
- Edited by: Ekaterina Shchedrina

Publication details
- History: 1955–present
- Publisher: Psychological Institute of Russian Academy of Education (Russian Federation)
- Frequency: Bimonthly
- Impact factor: 0,934 (2021)

Standard abbreviations
- ISO 4: Vopr. Psikhol.

Indexing
- ISSN: 0042-8841
- OCLC no.: 1769291

Links
- Journal homepage

Voprosy Psikhologii (Russian: Вопросы психологии, The Issues Relevant to Psychology) is a bimonthly Russian-language academic journal covering diverse areas of psychology and psychotherapy. The journal is included in the list of the Higher Attestation Commission and is also indexed in the Social Sciences Citation Index and Current Contents/Social & Behavioral Sciences.

== History and academic reputation ==
Launched in 1955, Voprosy Psikhologii (along with Psikhologicheskii zhurnal, founded in early 1970s) became the leading psychological journal of Russia in 1950s through 1990s.

Yet, the second decade of 21st century demonstrated gradual, but steady decline of the journal's academic reputation and impact, and, according to the national rating of Russian scholarly publications, the Russian Science Citation Index (RSCI), Voprosy Psikhologii currently occupies the 20th place (20/98) on the list of top-rated academic journals in psychology in Russian Federation.

According to research published by a Russian volunteer community network working to clean Russian science of plagiarism, the Dissernet, this journal is qualified as a "Journal with considerable deviations from academic publishing standards".

== Thematic coverage ==
The journal has the following rubrics:

- Theoretical Research
- Developmental and Pedagogical Psychology
- Psychology in High School
- Psychology and Practice
- Psychological counselling
- History of psychology
- Experimental Research
- Scientific Events
- Our Anniversaries

== See also ==
- List of psychology journals
- List of psychotherapy journals
