= Naum Meiman =

Soviet-Israeli mathematician and human rights activist

Naum Natanovich (Nokhim Sanalevich) Meiman
- Наум Натанович (Нохим Санелевич) Мейман
- Born: May 12, 1912; Bazar, Ukraine, Russian Empire
- Died: March 31, 2001 (aged 88); Tel Aviv, Israel
- Citizenship: Russian Empire → Soviet Union → Israel
- Education: Kazan State University
- Known for: human rights activism with participation in dissident movement in the Soviet Union
- Spouse: Inna Meiman-Kitrossky
- Awards: USSR State Prize
- Scientific career
- Fields: mathematics
- Workplaces: Kazan State University; University of Kharkiv; Institute for Physical Problems; Institute for Theoretical and Experimental Physics; Tel Aviv University; Moscow Helsinki Group
- Doctoral advisor: Nikolai Chebotaryov

Naum Natanovich (Nokhim Sanalevich) Meiman (Russian: Нау́м Ната́нович (Но́хим Са́нелевич) Ме́йман; 12 May 1912, Bazar, Ukraine – 31 March 2001, Tel Aviv) was a Soviet mathematician, and dissident. He is known for his work in complex analysis, partial differential equations, and mathematical physics, as well as for his dissident activity, in particular, for being a member of the Moscow Helsinki Group.

== Life ==
He was born in Bazar, Ukraine on 12 May 1912. In 1932 he graduated from Kazan State University as an extern. In 1937 he submitted his Ph.D. under the supervision of Nikolai Chebotaryov and was awarded the degree Doktor nauk. In 1939 he became a full professor at Kazan State University.

He worked for two years in the Mathematics Institute at the University of Kharkiv, where he became friends with Lev Landau with whom he collaborated for many years. After the Second World War, he went to Moscow and worked at the Institute for Physical Problems, where he was a head of the mathematics lab. Then he worked in the Institute for Theoretical and Experimental Physics. In 1953, he was awarded a Stalin prize for his work in theoretical physics. He made important contributions in the development of nuclear weapons in the USSR.

Starting in 1968, Meiman became active in politics and signed several letters of protest against political trials in the USSR.

In 1971, he retired and applied for permission to emigrate to Israel. Denied on grounds of knowing state secrets, he soon became a refusenik. Gradually he became more active in politics, and was a member of the Moscow Helsinki Group beginning in 1977. Later he became deputy chairman and the last active free member, writing hundreds of the group's documents. He also participated in a Refusenik scientific seminar. He was permanently under surveillance by the KGB, who also bugged his telephone and searched his home.

In 1982, Naum Meiman and Andrei Dmitrievich Sakharov published a letter in defence of Yuri Fyodorovich Orlov.

Meiman also struggled for the right of his wife Inna Meiman-Kitrossky to go to the USA for medical treatment since she had been diagnosed with cancer. After several years of struggle, she was allowed to go to the US and she died in February 1987 in Georgetown (Washington, D.C.). Meiman was not allowed to attend her funeral in Washington D.C.

In 1988 Meiman was finally allowed to emigrate to Israel, where he became a professor emeritus in Tel Aviv University. In 1992, in Tel-Aviv, there was a conference in his honor dedicated to his 80th birthday. Meiman died there in 2001.

== Online journals ==
- Московская Хельсинкская группа (Moscow Helsinki group). Мейман Наум Натанович (Naum Meiman) (in Russian)
- Naum Meiman. List of works
