= Grigory Vaypan =

Russian human rights lawyer and legal scholar

- Григорий Викторович Вайпан
- Born: Moscow, Russia
- Citizenship: Russian
- Education: Moscow State University; Harvard Law School; Saint Petersburg State University
- Occupations: Human rights lawyer; legal scholar
- Years active: c. 2013–present
- Known for: Senior Lawyer at Memorial "Children of the Gulag" litigation
- Awards: Moscow Helsinki Group Human Rights Award (2022)

Grigory Viktorovich Vaypan (Russian: Григорий Викторович Вайпан) is a Russian human rights lawyer and legal scholar. He is a lawyer at the human rights organization Memorial. He was designated a foreign agent in July 2024. He currently lives in Montenegro.

== Education ==
Vaypan has a law degree from Moscow State University, a Master of Laws from Harvard Law School, and a Ph.D. in International Law from Saint Petersburg State University.

In 2024, he returned to Harvard Law as a visiting researcher focused on transitional justice for Russia post-Vladimir Putin.

== Career ==
Vaypan worked at the Institute for Law and Public Policy in Moscow before joining Memorial in 2020.

=== Children of the Gulag case ===
Vaypan represented clients in the high profile "Children of the Gulag" case in Russian courts. The case followed a 2019 ruling in Russia's Constitutional Court that approximately 1,500 family members of those displaced by Soviet gulag era exile be given financial assistance to relocate.

In 2021, The Russian Supreme Court declined to hear the case.

=== Memorial ===
In 2021, he represented Memorial alongside Mikhail Biryukov, Henri Reznik, and Maria Eismont in liquidation proceedings. Memorial was liquidated by the Russian Supreme Court in December 2021.

=== Activity in exile ===
Since 2022, he has worked in the defense of Russian citizens who face legal troubles for protesting against the war in Ukraine.

== Foreign agent designation ==
The Russian Ministry of Justice accused Vaypan of spreading false information about Russian authorities, and speaking out against the "Special military operation". On 5 July 2024, he was designated a foreign agent, and on 28 November 2024 he was fined 30,000 rubles for violating said law.

== Awards ==
- 2022 Moscow Helsinki Group Human Rights Award
