= Kronid Lyubarsky =

Soviet dissident

Kronid Arkadyevich Lyubarsky
- Кронид Аркадьевич Любарский
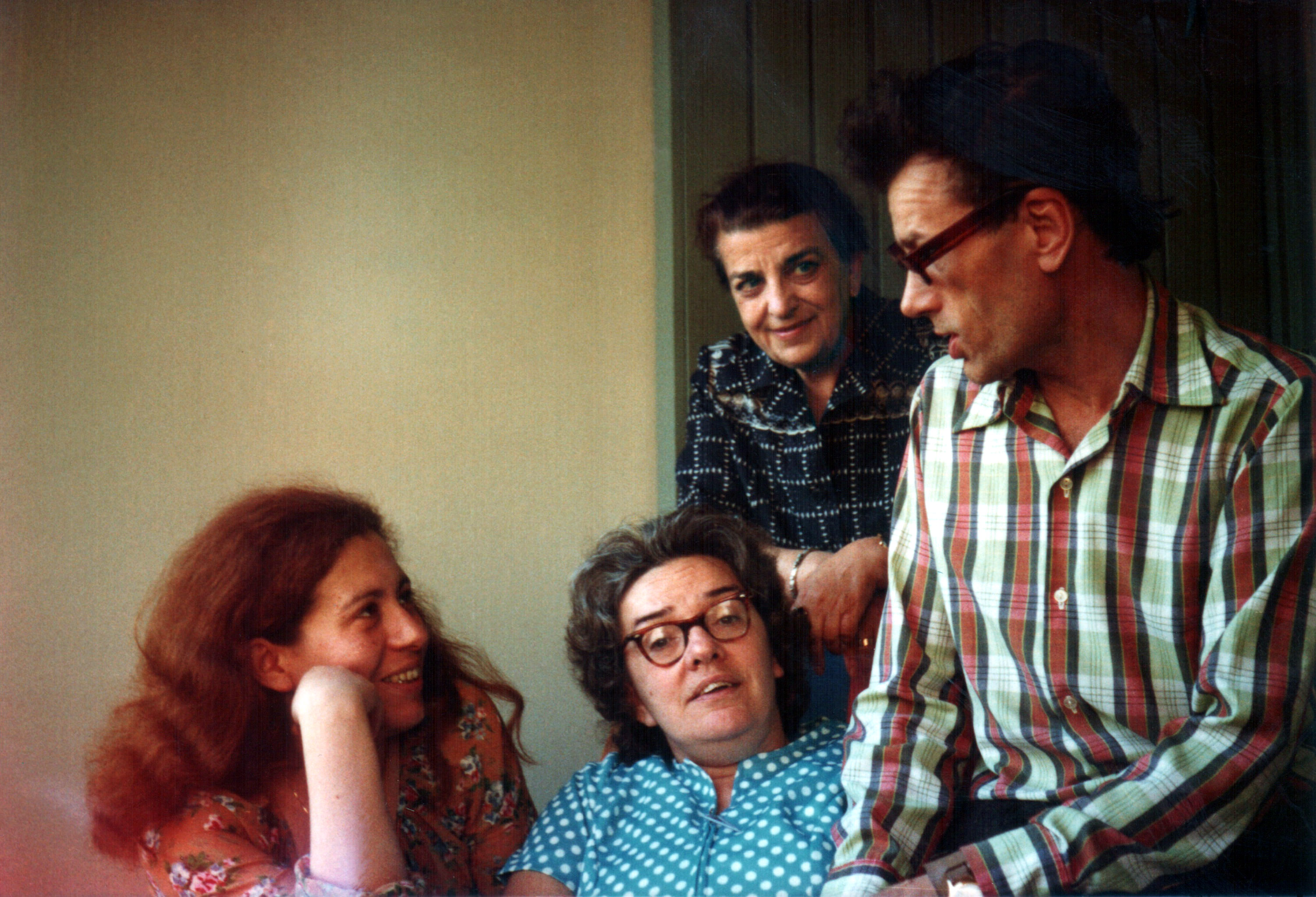
- Yuliya Vishnevskya, Lyudmila Alexeyeva, Dina Kaminskaya and Kronid Lyubarsky in Munich, 1978
- Born: April 4, 1934; Pskov, Russian SFSR, Soviet Union
- Died: May 23, 1996 (aged 62); Bali, Indonesia
- Citizenship: Soviet Union; Russia
- Education: Moscow State University
- Occupations: Astronomer, astrophysicist, journalist
- Known for: Human rights activism with participation in the Moscow Helsinki Group
- Movement: Dissident movement in the Soviet Union
- Spouse: Galina Salova

Kronid Arkadyevich Lyubarsky (Russian: Крони́д Арка́дьевич Люба́рский; 4 April 1934 – 23 May 1996) was a Russian journalist, dissident, human rights activist and political prisoner.

== Early career ==
Born in the city of Pskov, USSR, on April 4, 1934, Lyubarsky graduated from the Moscow State University in 1956 and worked as an astrophysicist at the All-Union Institute of Scientific and Technical Information of the USSR Academy of Sciences. His academic work included studies on meteors and space biology. He was also working in the Soviet program of interplanetary exploration of Mars. He authored several books on astrobiology and translated scientific works into Russian, including books by Fred Hoyle.

== Dissident activity ==
In the mid-1960s, Lyubarsky became active in the civil rights movement and became a contributing editor of various samizdat publications. These included the Chronicle of Current Events which circulated between April 1968 and August 1983, documenting extrajudicial persecution, arrests, court proceedings, incarceration in psychiatric hospitals and other forms of harassment in the Soviet Union.

In January 1972, Luybarsky's apartment was searched by the police and more than 600 documents, manuscripts and books were confiscated. The search was followed by his arrest three days later on charges of anti-Soviet agitation and propaganda. Following his conviction on October 30, 1972, Lyubarsky spent the next five years in various labor camps and prisons in Mordovia, as well as the notorious Vladimir Central Prison.

While still in the camps, he initiated the idea of celebrating a Day of the Political Prisoner in the USSR. The initiative spread quickly to other camps and prisons. The annual event later became Russia's Day of Remembrance of the Victims of Political Repressions.

After his release, Lyubarsky was exiled to Tarusa, a town in the Moscow Region, where he was kept under surveillance. During this period, he became one of the managers of the Public Aid Fund set up by the writer Alexander Solzhenitsyn to aid political prisoners, and a member of the Soviet branch of Amnesty International. However, mounting pressures by the authorities and the imminent threat of a renewed arrest forced Lyubarsky and his family into emigration in October 1977. Stripped of his citizenship, he sought political asylum in West Germany.

== Emigration ==
In Munich, Lyubarsky founded a bulletin, Vesti iz SSSR (USSR News Brief), a periodical providing comprehensive information between November 1978 and December 1991 about the human rights situation and resistance to the Communist regime in the Soviet Union. Published in Russian and English twice a month, this bulletin included an annual "List of Political Prisoners in the USSR", a yearbook of political prisoners complete with case details and family contacts. The list appeared until 1989, when the last Soviet political prisoner was released, and was widely used for reference by private citizens, human rights organizations and numerous parliamentary commissions, as well as the United States Congress.

Beginning in 1984, Lyubarsky also edited and published the magazine Strana i Mir (The Country and the World). Taking its name from a book by the political dissident and Nobel laureate, Andrei Sakharov, the magazine was intended for a broad readership. It reported not only on repression and resistance in the USSR but also economic and political developments in the rest of the world.

== Post-Soviet Russia ==
Lyubarsky returned to Russia following the breakup of the USSR. His citizenship was restored in June 1992.

Lyubarsky was one of the authors of the current Constitution of the Russian Federation and drafted a number of its articles, including those on the right to freedom of movement and residence within the borders of Russia.

In 1990, he joined the Soviet-International commission chaired by Irwin Cotler investigating the fate of Raoul Wallenberg, the Swedish diplomat who disappeared into the Soviet prison system.

In February 1993, he joined the magazine The New Times, where he was appointed first deputy editor in chief. He continued to write articles in defense of democracy and human rights. He was strongly opposed to the First Chechen War and took Duma deputy and film-maker Stanislav Govorukhin to court for defamation, when the latter quoted from a letter supposedly showing that certain Russian journalists were in the pay of the Chechen authorities. (After his death, Lyubarsky's widow Galina won the case against Govorukhin, and received the nominal damages — one Russian rouble — that he had demanded.)

From 1993 to 1996, Lyubarsky led the revived Moscow Helsinki Group, a watchdog organization first set up in the mid-1970s to monitor Soviet compliance with the human rights provisions in the 1975 Helsinki Final Act.

=== Death and legacy ===
Lyubarsky died of a heart attack, while vacationing in Indonesia, on 23 May 1996, aged 61.

An online version of USSR News Brief, the historic fortnightly bulletin compiled and issued by Lyubarsky in Munich, in the original Russian (Vesti iz SSSR), offers historians and activists the thousands of long and short reports provided by this unique source in the crucial and ambivalent years of Soviet history from 1978 to 1987 (and see below "External Links").

Lyubarsky's earlier years as a dissident and his work abroad, between 1976 and 1992, were recognised, posthumously, in 2000 when the International Press Institute named him a World Press Freedom Heroes of the past 50 years.

== Bibliography ==
- Любарский, Кронид (1962). Очерки по астробиологии [Outlines on astrobiology] (in Russian). Moscow: USSR Academy of Sciences Publishing House.
- Любарский, Кронид; Вдовыкин, Геннадий (1969). Возникновение органического вещества в Солнечной системе: сборник статей [The occurrence of organic matter in the Solar System: a collection of articles] (in Russian). Moscow: Mir Publishers.
- Lubarsky, Cronid (1979). Soziale Basis und Umfang des sowjetischen Dissidententums [Social basis and scope of Soviet dissidence] (in German). Köln: Bundesinstitut für Ostwissenschaftliche und Internationale Studien.
- Lubarsky, Cronid (1979). "Social basis and scope of Soviet dissidence". Osteuropa. 29 (11): 923–935.
- Желудков, Сергей; Любарский, Кронид (1982). Христианство и атеизм [Christianity and atheism] (in Russian). Brussels: Издательство "Жизнь с богом".
- Салова Г. И., ed. (2001). Кронид. Избранные статьи К. Любарского [Kronid. Selected articles by K. Lyubarsky] (in Russian). Moscow: Russian State University for the Humanities. ISBN 978-5-7281-0406-3. (publicly available unabridged Russian text)
- Lubarsky, Cronid (May 1988). "The human rights movement and perestroika". Index on Censorship. 17 (5): 16–20. doi:10.1080/03064228808534412.
