= Dina Kaminskaya =

Soviet lawyer and activist (1919–2006)

Dina Isaakovna Kaminskaya
- Дина Исааковна Каминская
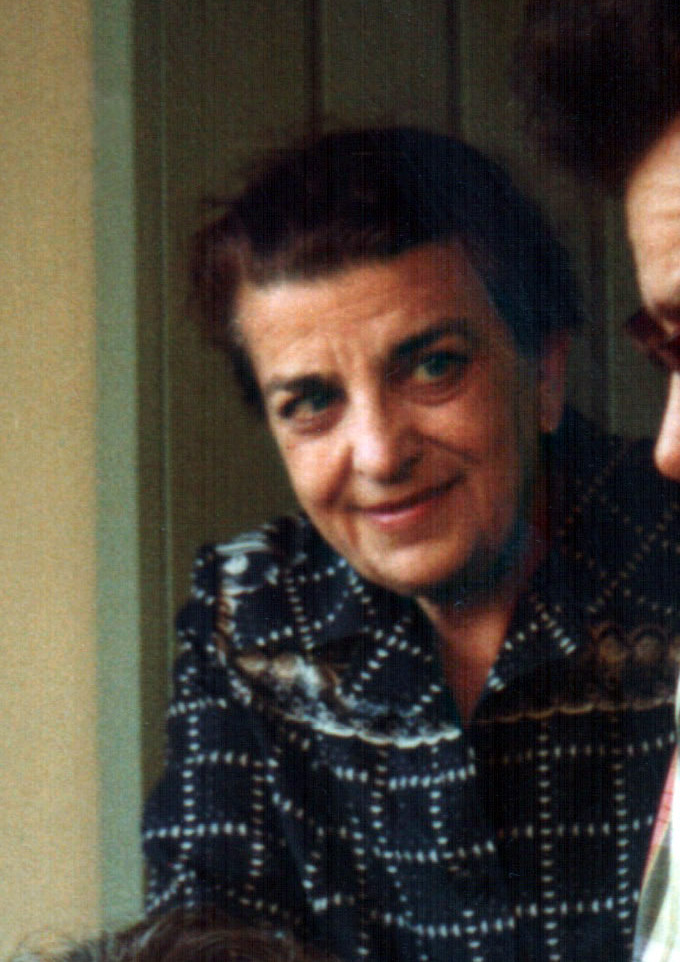
- Dina Kaminskaya in Munich, 1978
- Born: January 13, 1919; Yekaterinoslav, Ukrainian SSR
- Died: July 7, 2006 (aged 87); Falls Church, Virginia
- Citizenship: Soviet Union, United States
- Occupation: Lawyer
- Known for: Human rights activism with participation in the Moscow Helsinki Group
- Movement: Dissident movement in the Soviet Union
- Spouse: Konstantin Simis
- Children: Dimitri K. Simes

Dina Isaakovna Kaminskaya (Russian: Ди́на Иса́аковна Ками́нская, 13 January 1919, Yekaterinoslav – 7 July 2006, Falls Church, Virginia) was a lawyer and human rights activist in the Soviet Union who was forced to emigrate in 1977 to avoid arrest. She and her husband moved to the United States. She was born to Jewish family in Yekaterinoslav.

The writer Yuli Daniel engaged Kaminskaya as his lawyer when, in December 1965, he was prosecuted with Andrei Sinyavsky, but the state refused to allow her to speak up in court on his behalf. She went on to defend - as far as the Soviet authorities would let her in a legal system designed as an instrument of Soviet power - Vladimir Bukovsky in 1967. She also defended Yuri Galanskov (who would die in a Soviet labour camp), Anatoly Marchenko (who would also die in camp), Larisa Bogoraz and Pavel Litvinov, and the Crimean Tatar activist Mustafa Jemilev.

Kaminskaya was prevented from defending Bukovsky in his 1971 trial and Sergei Kovalyov in 1975. In 1977, after being stripped of her license to practice as a lawyer, she was barred from defending Anatoly Shcharansky. On account of her political defense work Kaminskaya was forced into exile in 1977.

Kaminskaya's book Final Judgment: my life as a Soviet defense attorney translated by Michael Glenny was published in English in 1982. In 1984, the book was published in Russian under the title Lawyer's Notes.

The recent publication of Stars of Advocacy qualifies Dina Kaminskaya and Sofia Kallistratova as stars of the legal profession in Soviet Russia.

Kaminskaya was married to Konstantin Simis and they had one son, Dimitri K. Simes. She died in Falls Church, Virginia.
