= Malva Landa =

Soviet-Israeli human rights activist and geologist

- Мальва Ланда
- Landa in the 1970s
- Born: 14 August 1918; Odesa, Ukrainian State (now Ukraine)
- Died: 3 July 2019 (aged 100); Haifa, Israel
- Occupations: Human rights activist, geologist

Malva Noyivna Landa (Note: Russian: Ма́льва Но́евна Ла́нда, romanized: Mal'va Noyevna Landa Ukrainian: Ма́льва Но́ївна Ла́нда Hebrew: מלבה לנדה) (14 August 1918 – 3 July 2019) was a Ukrainian-born Soviet-Russian dissident, publicist, and geologist. She was the author of multiple articles about human rights, the translator of number of humanitarian essays from English to Russian, and a veteran of the human rights movement in the Soviet Union, being a member of the Moscow Helsinki Group from its founding in 1976. She received the Officer of the Order of the Cross of Vytis (Lithuania, 8 January 2003).

== Early life and career ==
Malva Noyivna Landa was born in Odesa, in what was then the Ukrainian State, amidst World War I and the Russian Civil War. Landa's family was Jewish. Her mother was a high school teacher, and her father was a professor of animal husbandry at a veterinary institute. In the autumn of 1932, her father was imprisoned and tortured in the jail of Stalingrad, and in 1938, he was executed. From 1940 to 1945, she studied at the Moscow Geological Prospecting Sergo Ordzhonikidze Institute (now the Russian State Geological Prospecting University). In the 1950s, she worked as a head of geological surveying party Karatau Expedition MGRI.

== Dissident activities ==
Landa was a founding member of the Moscow Helsinki Group, which campaigned for the Soviet Unions to abide by its human rights commitments under the 1975 Helsinki Accords. She made the statement that the Soviet socialist system may not respect human rights and, accordingly, was not in compliance with the provisions of the Helsinki Accords. She joined the Helsinki Group to more effectively expose the situation of human rights in the Soviet Union. The group was mainly involved in the issue of political prisoners.

On 26 March 1980, Landa was sentenced to five years exile under article 190-1 of the Russian SFSR criminal code, which banned the dissemination of false fabrications defaming the Soviet state and social system. She served time in the village of Dzhezdy, Dzhezkazgan Region in Kazakhstan. She remained in the Helsinki Group and returned from exile in 1984.

== Later life and death ==
Following the dissolution of the Soviet Union, Landa continued to participate in political activities in Russia, particularly criticising the Chechen–Russian conflict and President Vladimir Putin. In March 2010, she signed a petition advocating for Putin's removal from office.

In 2015, aged 97, Landa moved to Israel, where she lived with her son and daughter-in-law in Haifa. She died there on 3 July 2019.
