= Vladimir Slepak =

Soviet-Israeli human rights activist

Vladimir Semyonovich Slepak
- Владимир Семёнович Слепак
- Born: 29 October 1927; Moscow, Russian SFSR, Soviet Union (now Russia)
- Died: 24 April 2015 (aged 87); New York, New York, United States
- Citizenship: Soviet Union (1927–1987); Israel (1987–2015)
- Education: Moscow Aviation Institute
- Occupation: Radio engineer
- Known for: human rights activism, participation in the Moscow Helsinki Group
- Movement: Dissident movement in the Soviet Union

Vladimir Semyonovich Slepak (Russian: Влади́мир Семёнович Слепа́к; 29 October 1927 – 24 April 2015) was a Soviet dissident, refusenik, member of the Moscow Helsinki Group. Along with his wife Mariya Slepak (née Rashkovskaya) and sons Alexander and Leonid he fought for the right of Jews to emigrate from the Soviet Union.

He participated in the compilation of about 70 documents, appeals by Moscow Helsinki Group.

He graduated from the Moscow Aviation Institute as a radio engineer.

He lived and worked in Moscow as the head of the laboratory at the Research Institute of television in Golyanovo District and trust "Spetsgeofizika."

Slepak and his wife were arrested by Soviet authorities on June 1, 1978, after displaying a banner from their Moscow apartment reading: "Let us go to our son in Israel." On June 21, they were sentenced to "internal exile" for "malicious hooliganism". Slepak was sent to the village of Tsokto-Khangil, Agin-Buryat Autonomous Okrug in the Chita Oblast, where he lived in a shack and worked as a stoker in temperatures reaching -50 degrees Celsius. "Nobody knows" what will happen after his sentence is completed, he wrote in English to a Canadian supporter. "Let's be more optimistic. Let's hope for a 'happy end' of this too long story." Slepak returned to Moscow from exile in Siberia on December 4, 1982.

On Oct. 14, 1987, months after finishing a 17-day protest fast, Soviet authorities announced they would allow the Slepaks to leave the country. Previously, Slepak told Natan Sharansky, the KGB had told him that he couldn't leave the Soviet Union "because you know state secrets." When Slepak questioned the assertion, because "Where I worked, we were ten years behind the West," the KGB officer responded: "Aha, that's the secret." "But that secret is known by every schoolboy," Slepak protested. "But you know it better," he was told.

The Slepaks emigrated to Israel on October 26, 1987, 17 years after he first applied to the Soviet Visa Office to leave. He immediately lived with his family in Kfar Saba, Israel.

== Books ==
- Potok, Chaim; Slepak, Leonid; Slepak, Vladimir; Slepak, Alexander; Slepak, Maria (2010). The Gates of November. Random House Publishing Group. ISBN 978-0307575517.
