= Anatoly Marchenko =

Soviet dissident (1938–1986)

- Анатолий Марченко
- Born: 23 January 1938; Barabinsk, Novosibirsk Oblast, Russian SFSR, Soviet Union (now Russia)
- Died: 8 December 1986 (aged 48); Chistopol, Tatar ASSR, Russian SFSR, Soviet Union (now Russia)
- Cause of death: Hunger strike
- Citizenship: Soviet Union
- Occupations: Driller, writer, human rights activist
- Years active: 1958–1986
- Known for: Human rights activism, Moscow Helsinki Group co-founder
- Movement: Dissident movement in the Soviet Union
- Spouse: Larisa Bogoraz
- Awards: Sakharov Prize for Freedom of Thought

Anatoly Tikhonovich Marchenko (Russian: Анато́лий Ти́хонович Ма́рченко, 23 January 1938 – 8 December 1986) was a Soviet dissident, author, and human rights campaigner, who became one of the first two recipients (along with Nelson Mandela) of the Sakharov Prize for Freedom of Thought of the European Parliament when it was awarded to him posthumously in 1988.

Marchenko, originally an apolitical oil driller from a poor background, turned to writing and politics as a result of several episodes of incarceration starting in 1958, during which he began to associate with other dissidents. Marchenko gained international fame in 1969 through his book, My Testimony, an autobiographical account written after his arrival in Moscow in 1966 about his then-recent sentences in Soviet labour camps and prisons. After limited circulation inside the Soviet Union as samizdat, the book caused a sensation in the West after it revealed that the Soviet gulag system had continued after the death of Joseph Stalin.

In 1968, in the run-up to the Soviet invasion of Czechoslovakia, Marchenko wrote an open letter predicting the invasion. Arrested again, he was released in the early 1970s, but in 1974 he was interrogated and internally exiled to Irkutsk Oblast. In 1976, Marchenko became one of the founding members of the Moscow Helsinki Group, before being again arrested and imprisoned in 1981, where he kept writing throughout his prison time, publicizing the fate of Soviet political prisoners. Having spent about 20 years in all in prison and internal exile, Nathan Shcharansky said of him: "After the release of Yuri Feodorovich Orlov, he was definitely the number one Soviet prisoner of conscience." becoming one of the Soviet Union's "perpetual prisoner[s]".

Marchenko died at age 48 in Chistopol prison hospital, as a result of a three-month-long hunger strike, the goal of which was the release of all Soviet prisoners of conscience. The widespread international outcry over his death was a major factor in finally pushing then-Soviet General Secretary Mikhail Gorbachev to authorize the large-scale amnesty of political prisoners in 1987.

== Early life ==
Anatoly Tikhonovich Marchenko was born on 23 January 1938, in Barabinsk, Novosibirsk Oblast, in the Siberia region of the Russian SFSR, Soviet Union, to illiterate railway workers from a peasant background. His father, Tikon Akhimovich, was a locomotive fireman, and his mother was a train station cleaner. The couple had two other sons, one of whom died in infancy. His grandfather had been shot by Aleksandr Kolchak.

Marchenko left school two years short of the normal full secondary education in the Soviet Union. He then joined the Komsomol, and became a shift foreman for an oil drilling group, which travelled around the Siberia region.

== First imprisonment and political prisoner ==
In 1958, while on a job at the Karaganda power station, Marchenko ran into trouble which resulted in his first period of imprisonment: some exiled Chechens began a fight with some of the Russian workers in the hostel where Marchenko was staying. Marchenko broke up the fight, but after the fight was over and most of the combatants had left, "the police indiscriminately arrested the innocent and the guilty"; they were all sent to the Karaganda labour camps.

Two-years later, Marchenko escaped from the camp, just as his sentence was about to be overturned. Seeing no future for himself in the Soviet Union, he tried to escape over the border into Iran; however, he was captured on October 29 near Ashkabad, just short of the border. Marchenko was subsequently tried for treason on 2 March 1961; the charge of treason was because he supposedly intended to engage in work against the Soviet Union for money. In reality, it was payback for his attempt to leave. On 3 March 1961, he was convicted for treason and was sentenced to six-years in labour camp, officially designating Marchenko a political prisoner, not an ordinary criminal as he was previously.

After several months in a series of transit prisons, Marchenko was moved to a labour camp in Mordovia where attempted to escape, but did not succeed, and as a result he was sentenced to serve three-years of his sentence in a regular prison, which he spent in the infamous Vladimir Prison. While in Vladimir, he went on a long hunger strike, a tactic he would often later repeat. In 1963, Marchenko was moved from Vladimir back to the labour camp in Mordovia. While there, in March 1966, he survived a bout of meningitis with almost no medical care, which caused problems with his ears which would trouble him for the rest of his life. During his time in the camps Marchenko educated himself, reading a number of accessible socio-political works, including the complete works of the communist figures Karl Marx, Friedrich Engels, and Soviet Union founder Vladimir Lenin. Marchenko also met a number of intellectual political prisoners, including Yuli Daniel.

=== First release and My Testimony ===
Marchenko was released on 2 November 1966, and spent months travelling through the Russian SFSR, trying to find a locality which would allow him register to live there. He finally succeeded in being allowed to register in his birthplace Barabinsk, and later in Alexandrov, Vladimir Oblast. From May 1968, while still formally living in Alexandrov, Marchenko was working in Moscow as a loader, the only job available to him, even though doctors had warned him not to do hard manual labour. During this time he had met several fellow dissidents, including Larisa Bogoraz, the wife of his associate Yuli Daniel, who were in the process of legal separation. Marchenko was determined to write a record of the camps, and his fellow prisoners, and he enlisted their aid in his project. They also helped him receive medical care, both for his ears, and for problems with internal bleeding in his stomach.

The Gulag labor camp system operating in the Soviet Union had been heavily associated with General Secretary Joseph Stalin, whose death in March 1953 started an amnesty limited to non-political prisoners and for political prisoners sentenced to 5 or fewer years. Most of those released were convicted for common crimes; however the release of political prisoners started in 1954 and became widespread. Stalin's successor as General Secretary, Nikita Khrushchev, denounced Stalinism in his Secret Speech at the 20th Congress of the CPSU in February 1956, which coupled the amnesty with mass political rehabilitation. The Soviet state continued to maintain the extensive camp system for a while after Stalin's death, although the period saw the grip of the camp authorities weaken, and a number of conflicts and uprisings occurred in this time. The Gulag institution was closed by the MVD order No. 020 of January 25, 1960, but forced labor colonies for political and criminal prisoners continued to exist - one of the most famous camps in the system, Perm-36, operated continuously until 1987 when it was closed.

By December 1967, Marchenko had finished work on his book, My Testimony, the first book to reveal that the gulag had continued in full operation after the death of Joseph Stalin, which had been believed by many inside and outside of the Soviet Union to have been dismantled by Khrushchev. My Testimony provided a detailed account of both his time in labour camps and in prison, as well as a wide-ranging look at conditions there. The publication of the book would later earn Marchenko further imprisonment for anti-Soviet agitation and propaganda. The book was described by The Daily Telegraph as "An extraordinarily important book ... a totally realistic, detailed, factual and yet profoundly and human account of Russian prison and camp life...".

=== Open dissidence ===
On 5 September 1967, Marchenko announced to the authorities his association with the dissident circle by appearing at a search of the apartment of the mother of Alexander Ginzburg, the subject of another famous show trial. On 27 March 1968, Marchenko wrote an open letter to Alexander Chakovsky, then editor of the Literaturnaya Gazeta, contradicting a letter from Chakovsky which had been published that day, which had charged that dissidents were "fed .. at public expense in [Soviet] prisons [and] corrective labour colonies". Marchenko bitterly refuted the charges from his own personal experience, pointing out that rations were minimal, and the prisoners over-worked. On 17 April, he followed this up with a series of letters on the same subject to the head of the Soviet Red Cross, and other highly placed people.

Marchenko soon began to focus on the Soviet invasion of Czechoslovakia. On 22 July 1968, he wrote an open letter to a variety of publications, including Communist party media in the West, about the situation there, predicting that the Soviet Union would not allow the 'Prague Spring' to continue. This action was too much for the authorities: as a result, on 28 July, Marchenko was arrested and charged with "violating passport regulations" because of his presence in Moscow. On 21 August, the same day that the Soviet Union invaded Czechoslovakia as he had predicted it would, he was sentenced to the maximum penalty for that crime, one-year in a labor camp. In reality, his crime had been the open letter about Czechoslovakia. Marchenko was then sent to a camp in Perm Oblast, where he was scheduled to be released on 27 July 1969, but before that could happen he was tried on charges of "defamation of the Soviet political system", notionally for statements on the subjects of Czechoslovakia and human rights in the Soviet Union which he supposedly had made in while imprisoned in the camp. In reality, as Soviet officials later admitted, it was payback for the publication of My Testimony in the West, for which he was tried on that charge on 22 August and convicted, and on August 26 he was sentenced to a further two-years of imprisonment.

=== Exile to Siberia ===
Although many of Marchenko's associates did not expect him to live through this imprisonment, including his American publisher E. P. Dutton, he did, and was released in August 1971. After his release Marchenko was given a choice for his place of internal exile, choosing Chuna, a town in Irkutsk Oblast where his fellow dissident Larisa Bogoraz was also in internal exile. Bogoraz had been sentenced to four-years of internal exile after being arrested in August 1968 for publicly protesting the invasion of Czechoslovakia. Now fully divorced from Yuli Daniel, a process that Bogoraz had started before she met Marchenko, she and Marchenko had become lovers during the period after his first release from prison.^{[a]} The two eventually married before September 1972, when the couple moved to Tarusa, Kaluga Oblast, where they moved into a dilapidated house which Marchenko rebuilt. While there, they had a son, Pavel, born that winter. Marchenko's health was still poor, and he was unable to find any work other than manual labour as a furnace stoker in a factory.

=== Continued dissident activity ===
Tarusa was a little over 100 kilometers from Moscow, so Marchenko and Bogoraz were able to maintain contact with dissident circles in the capital, which were being increasingly repressed as they more openly challenged the government. The couple had considered emigrating out of the Soviet Union, and the increasing repression caused them to pursue this idea further. On 23 August 1973, Marchenko wrote to Kurt Waldheim, then-Secretary-General of the United Nations, expressing concern about the condition of another imprisoned writer. A letter to Willy Brandt, warning of the dangers of détente, followed. The authorities replied with increased repressive measures aimed at Marchenko through 1974, and the more they pressed him, the more it moved him to act. On 10 December, Marchenko wrote a letter to Nikolai Podgorny, then-Chairman of the Presidium of the Supreme Soviet of the USSR, renouncing his Soviet citizenship, and indicating he intended to emigrate to the United States. The Soviet response was to encourage him to apply for an exit visa to Israel, which they could use for propaganda purposes, and because of this Marchenko refused to cooperate even though he could have easily changed his destination once out of the Soviet Union.

In response to his refusal to cooperate in any way, on 26 February 1975, he was again arrested, and charged with violating the "administrative supervision" measures which had been imposed on him the previous summer. An account in the samizdat periodical, A Chronicle of Current Events, details his life hitherto and the subsequent trial at the Kaluga City Court. Marchenko's response was to begin a hunger strike, on which he was still engaged when he was tried a month later on 31 March. He was quickly convicted, and sentenced that day to four years of internal exile to Siberia, again to Chuna. During a two-week wait for transport to begin, and for a week thereafter, Marchenko continued his hunger strike. During this entire period, he received no special treatment, and was handled just like all the other prisoners, only giving up on 21 April (53 days after it had begun) when it became clear to him that he was at risk of death. His transportation to Siberia through a series of prisons in Sverdlovsk, Novosibirsk, and Irkutsk lasted through the rest of April and May.

=== Second exile to Siberia, From Tarusa to Siberia and To Live Like Everyone ===
On arrival in Chuna, Marchenko started work as a log handler at a sawmill, a place where he had worked during his previous period of exile. Later in 1975, he suffered an attack of neuritis, and was hospitalized in Irkutsk, although he was forced to leave before he was fully recovered. During his exile, he managed to complete his second book, From Tarusa to Siberia, in October 1975, which covered his then-recent trial and hunger strike. In 1976, Marchenko became one of the co-founders of the Moscow Helsinki Group, a prominent human right organization in Russia and the former Soviet Union.

In September 1978, Marchenko's term of exile ended and he was allowed to leave Chuna. He and his family moved back to the vicinity of Moscow, where he was given an ultimatum to leave the Soviet Union or go back to prison, but ignored it. During this period, Marchenko completed his third and final book, To Live Like Everyone, the title was a favourite phrase of his. It covered the period from 1966 to 1969, when he was writing My Testimony, up through his trial in retribution for its publication. The publication of this new book lead to his final arrest in 1980, and on 3 September 1981, Marchenko went on trial again for "anti-Soviet agitation", and the next day was given a 15-year sentence: 10-years of imprisonment and 5-years of internal exile.

=== Final hunger strike and death, August–December 1986 ===
Details about Marchenko's last period of imprisonment are largely unknown, although in December 1983 he was badly beaten by guards, and fell unconscious as a result. The first report of his death was published in mid-December 1986 in USSR Update, the fortnightly digest of news compiled in Munich by Kronid Lyubarsky. Over the next few years, Bogoraz began a public campaign to free all Soviet political prisoners, which proved ultimately successful when General Secretary Mikhail Gorbachev began mass releases in 1987. However, this proved too late for Marchenko, who had died on December 8, 1986, at the hospital of the prison in Chistopol, Tatar ASSR. The exact cause of his death is not certain; some reports indicate problems with his heart and others a stroke, however it is agreed to have been related to the hunger strike.

Marchenko died not long before Gorbachev's announcement - ironically from the effects of a hunger strike demanding the release of all Soviet political prisoners. This last hunger strike started on 4 August 1986 when he wrote a letter to the Helsinki review conference in Vienna. Despite little reaction to his hunger strike from the world press, Marchenko continued the hunger strike through November, although Bogoraz believed that he ended it around the end of November, when he was placed on the sick list. There were indications shortly before his death that the Soviet authorities were on the verge of releasing him. Marchenko died after being hospitalized the day before, and every effort to conceal the reason for Marchenko's death was made, as KGB deputy chairman Bobkov's report to the Politburo indicates.

His wife and their son travelled to Chistopol to bury him there, as they were not allowed to bring his body back to Moscow for burial. Marchenko was buried on 12 December, near the prison in Chistopol, after Russian Orthodox rites at a church nearby. Bogoraz was denied a death certificate, and had to write his name in ballpoint pen on the pine wood cross on his grave.

== Posthumous Sakharov Prize for Freedom of Thought ==
On the award of the Sakharov Prize to his widow, Larisa Bogoraz, in 1988, Andrei Sakharov himself paid tribute to Anatoli Marchenko, saying, in a message to the EP: 'in My Testimony Marchenko was the first to tell the truth about the post-Stalin labour camps and prisons. His book became one of the foundation stones of the human rights movement in our country. With its spirit of morality through non-violent struggle for justice, with its aspiration towards unconcealed and complete truth, the book aroused the hatred of the organs of repression towards its author. The whole of his subsequent life and his tragic death on Chistopol prison was their way of repaying him for this truth, this steadfastness, for his high moral principle. The achievement of Marchenko's life and work is an enormous contribution to the cause of democracy, of humanity and of justice'.

== Quotations ==
- "When I was locked up in Vladimir Prison I was often seized by despair. Hunger, illness, and above all helplessness, the sheer impossibility of struggling against evil, provoked me to the point where I was ready to hurl myself upon my jailers with the sole purpose of being killed. .. One thing alone prevented me, one thing alone gave me the strength to live through that nightmare; the hope that I would eventually come out and tell the whole world what I had seen and experienced. .. And I gave my word on this to my comrades who were doomed to spend many more years behind bars and barbed wire." (Introduction to My Testimony)
- "I am convinced that publicity is the sole effective means of combating the evil and lawlessness which is rampant in my country today."

== Notes ==
^{1} There is some confusion about the date; From Tarusa to Siberia gives 1971, and To Live Like Everyone gives 1973.

== Bibliography ==
- Anatoly Marchenko, (translator Michael Scammell), My Testimony (Dutton, New York, 1969)
- Anatoly Marchenko, (editor Joshua Rubenstein), From Tarusa to Siberia (Strathcona, Michigan, 1980)
- Anatoly Marchenko, (translator Paul Goldberg), To Live Like Everyone (Henry Holt & Co., New York, 1989)
- Marchenko, Anatoly (May 1980). "Some are more equal than others". Society. 17 (4): 9–11. doi:10.1007/BF02694798. S2CID 143532893.

== Other sources ==
- Anatoly Marchenko, (translator Michael Scammell), My Testimony (Penguin, Harmondsworth, 1971, paperback edition - This edition contains an appendix with many documents related to the events of 1968–1969, which is not present in other editions.)
- The Limits of Glasnost^{[unfit]}
- Anatoli Marchenko Sakharov Prize Laureate
