= Viktor Nekipelov =

Soviet human rights activist

Viktor Aleksandrovich Nekipelov
- Виктор Александрович Некипелов
- Nekipelov in Kameshkovo in 1978
- Born: 29 September 1928; Harbin, Republic of China (now People's Republic of China)
- Died: 1 July 1989 (aged 60); Paris, France
- Education: Kharkiv Medical Institute, Maxim Gorky Literature Institute
- Occupations: Medicine, pharmacy, literature, poetry
- Organization: Moscow Helsinki Group
- Known for: Human rights activism
- Movement: Dissident movement in the Soviet Union
- Criminal charges: 1st term: spreading of known false fabrications that is damaging the Soviet political system (Article 190-1 of the RSFSR Criminal Code), 2nd term: Anti-Soviet agitation and propaganda (Article 70 of the RSFSR Criminal Code)
- Criminal penalty: two years in a labour camp (1st term), seven years in a labour camp and five years in internal exile (2nd term)
- Spouse: Nina Komarova
- Awards

Viktor Aleksandrovich Nekipelov (Russian: Ви́ктор Алекса́ндрович Некипе́лов, 29 September 1928 – 1 July 1989) was a Soviet Russian poet, writer, Soviet dissident, and a member of the Moscow Helsinki Group. He spent about nine years in prison for his participation in the Moscow Helsinki Group.

== Early life ==
Nekipelov was born to a Soviet family of workers of the Chinese Eastern Railway. In 1937, he and his mother came to the Soviet Union. In 1939, his mother was arrested and died in imprisonment. He left a high school in Omsk. From 1947 to 1950, he studied at the Omsk Army Medical School. In 1950, he left the Omsk Army Medical School with honours. In 1960, he graduated from the army medical faculty of the Kharkiv Medical Institute with honours as well. In 1969, he graduated from an extramural faculty of the Moscow Literature Institute. He worked as a pharmacist.

== Dissident ==
In 1973, he was arrested for "spreading of known false fabrications that is damaging the Soviet political system" (Article 190-1 of the RSFSR Criminal Code). According to Sakharov's letter to Gorbachev of 19 February 1986, Nekipelov was convicted for his philosophical verses that were considered defamatory by a court. Nekipelov was sent to the Section 4 of the Serbsky Institute of Forensic Psychiatry for psychiatric evaluation, which lasted from 15 January to 12 March 1974, was judged sane (which he was), tried, and sentenced to two years' imprisonment. In 1976, he published in samizdat his book Institute of Fools: Notes on the Serbsky Institute based on his personal experience at Psychiatric Hospital of the Serbsky Institute and translated into English in 1980.

In October 1977, Nekipelov joined the Moscow Helsinki Group. In 1977, the joint book From Yellow Silence: The Collection of Memoirs and Articles by Political Prisoners of Psychiatric Hospitals by Nekipelov and Alexander Podrabinek was completed.

After publishing Institute of Fools, he was sentenced to the maximum punishment for "anti-Soviet agitation and propaganda" of seven years in a labour camp and then five years in internal exile. As Zavoisky and Krylovsky wrote, Nekipelov developed cancer caused by his permanent poisoning in a prison camp. On 20 March 1983, Nekipelov and 9 other political prisoners in their letter to US President of Ronald Reagan sought his aid in urging inspection of Soviet camps.

Along with Arina Ginzburg, Malva Landa, Tatyana Velikanova and Andrei Sakharov he demanded a referendum in the Baltic republics to determine their political destiny.

Released in 1987, he emigrated to France where he died in 1989.

In 1992, the selection of his verses was published by Memorial society.

== On his book ==
In his book Institute of Fools, he wrote compassionately, engagingly, and observantly of the doctors and other patients; most of the latter were ordinary criminals feigning insanity in order to be sent to a mental hospital, because hospital was a "cushy number" as against prison camps. According to the President of the Independent Psychiatric Association of Russia Yuri Savenko, Nekipelov's book is a highly dramatic humane document, a fair story about the nest of Soviet punitive psychiatry, a mirror that psychiatrists always need to look into. However, according to Malcolm Lader, this book as an indictment of the Serbsky Institute hardly rises above tittle-tattle and gossip, and Nekipelov destroys his own credibility by presenting no real evidence but invariably putting the most sinister connotation on events.

After reading the book, Donetsk psychiatrist Pekhterev concluded that allegations against the psychiatrists sounded from the lips of a negligible but vociferous part of inmates who when surfeiting themselves with cakes pretended to be sufferers. According to the response by Robert van Voren, Pekhterev in his article condescendingly argues that the Serbsky Institute was not so bad place and that Nekipelov exaggerates and slanders it, but Pekhterev, by doing so, misses the main point: living conditions in the Serbsky Institute were not bad, those who passed through psychiatric examination there were in a certain sense "on holiday" in comparison with the living conditions of the Gulag; and all the same, everyone was aware that the Serbsky Institute was more than the "gates of hell" from where people were sent to specialized psychiatric hospitals in Chernyakhovsk, Dnepropetrovsk, Kazan, Blagoveshchensk, and that is not all. Their life was transformed to unimaginable horror with daily tortures by forced administration of drugs, beatings and other forms of punishment. Many went crazy, could not endure what was happening to them, some even died during the "treatment" (for example, a miner from Donetsk Alexey Nikitin). Many books and memoirs are written about the life in the psychiatric Gulag and every time when reading them a shiver seizes us.

== Publications ==
Social and political journalism

- Khodorovich, Tatyana; Nekipelov, Victor (1977). "Political reprisal by means of the Criminal Code (excerpts from an open letter)" (PDF). Basket III: implementation of the Helsinki Accords. Hearings before the Commission on Security and Cooperation in Europe. Ninety-fifth congress. First session on implementation of the Helsinki Accords. Vol. IV. Washington, D.C.: U.S. Government Printing Office. pp. 27–28. Archived (PDF) from the original on 23 November 2015.
- Nekipelov, Viktor; Podrabinek, Alexander (1977). Из жёлтого безмолвия: Сборник воспоминаний и статей политзаключенных психиатрических больниц [From yellow silence: the collection of memoirs and articles by political prisoners of psychiatric hospitals] (in Russian). Moscow.
- Nekipelov, Viktor (1980). Institute of Fools: Notes from the Serbsky. Victor Gollancz. ISBN 978-0575028920.
- Nekipelov, Viktor (2013) [1979]. Сталин на ветровом стекле [Stalin on windshield]. Kontinent (in Russian). 152.
- Nekipelov, Viktor; Serebrov, Feliks (November 1979). Факультет демократии. О зарубежных радиопередачах на русском языке: советы и пожелания [The faculty of democracy. On foreign radio programs in Russian: advices and wishes] (in Russian). Moscow.

Poetry

- Nekipelov, Viktor (1966). Между Марсом и Венерой [Between Mars and Venus] (in Russian). Uzhhorod: Karpaty.
- Nekipelov, Viktor (1991). Стихи [Verses] (in Russian). Paris: La Presse Libre.
- Nekipelov, Viktor (1992). Стихи: Избранное [Verses: selection] (in Russian). Boston: Publishing House "Memorial".
