= Sofiya Kalistratova =

Russian-Soviet political activist

- Софья Каллистратова
- Born: Sofiya Vasilyevna Kalistratova; 19 September [O.S. 6 September] 1907; Rylsk, Kursk Governorate, the Russian Empire
- Died: 5 December 1989 (aged 82); Moscow, the Soviet Union
- Citizenship: Russian Empire (1907–1917) → RSFSR (1917–1922) → Soviet Union (1922–1989)
- Education: Moscow State University
- Occupation: Soviet public defense lawyer in trials of Soviet dissidents
- Known for: human rights activism with participation in the Moscow Helsinki Group and trials of Soviet dissidents
- Movement: dissident movement in the Soviet Union

Sofiya Vasilyevna Kalistratova (Russian: Со́фья Васи́льевна Калистра́това), also known as Sofia Kallistratova (Софья Каллистратова; 19 September [O.S. 6 September] 1907 – 5 December 1989) was a public defense lawyer in the Soviet Union. She defended various Soviet dissidents and from 1977 was a member of the Moscow Helsinki Group (MHG), distributing information about human rights violations in the Soviet Union.

== Biography ==
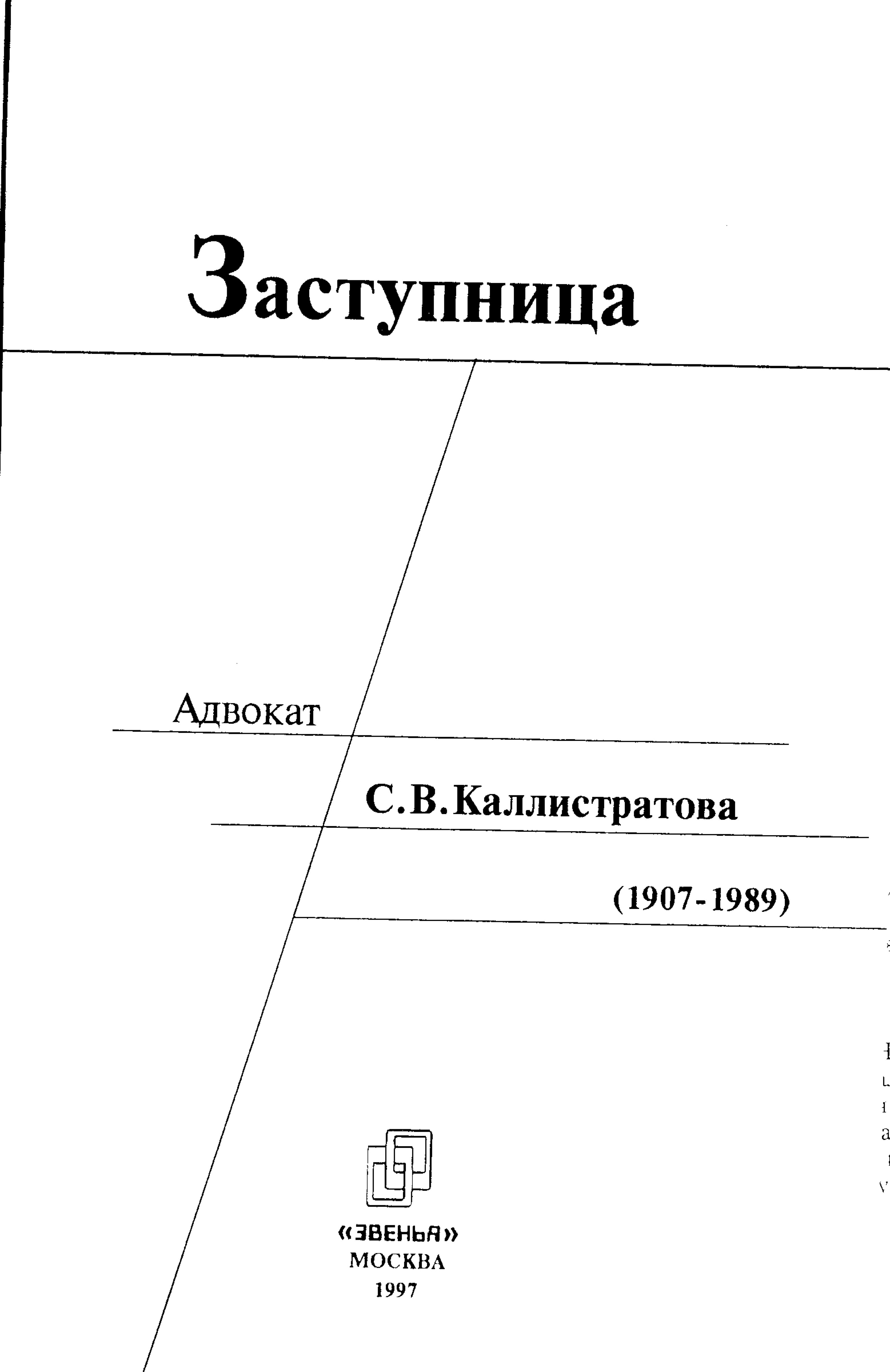
Protectress, the 1997 book about Kalistratova

.

Born in the town of Rylsk, she graduated from the Moscow State University, specializing in the field of law. Unable to find a position in prosecutor's office, she began her activity as public defender at the Moscow College of Advocates (Московская Коллегия адвокатов). According to rumors, in the 1960s, the officer who was issuing her with a new passport, misspelled the last name "Kallistratova" as "Kalistratova". Sofiya did not make a big deal out of it and signed the documents as Kalistratova ever since.

She joined the Moscow Helsinki Group as a legal consultant. The KGB searched Kalistratova's apartment several times and confiscated typewriters and documents. Some of Kalistratova's friends were arrested. The activity of the Moscow Helsinki Group became nearly impossible when Yuri Andropov started his campaign of repression against dissidents. Supporters claim that all their work defending the human right to obtain, discuss, and distribute information was legal.

As many other human rights defenders, she was accused of Anti-Sovietism; the charges were later dropped. In 1987, she tried to initiate a campaign for amnesty for political prisoners.

During perestroika and glasnost, material regarding violations of the law between 1917 and 1985 were published in the mass media. The popular question of correspondents of newspapers was: "In your family, how have your views on the politics of the Soviet Union changed since Glasnost?", and the relatives of Kalistratova could answer: Our point of view did not change during this glasnost. That time, various literators used to say "We did not know" about the period 1917–1986, and, especially, about the Brezhnev stagnation (1966–1985). She usually replied: "You are lying. You do not look like an idiot. You DID know, but you were afraid to talk about it."

Yuly Kim dedicated her a song.

== Death ==
Kalistratova died in 1989 and was interred in Vostryakovskoye Cemetery in Moscow. For her activism, she was awarded the medal of the Guild of Russian Advocates. In 2003, a book about her life was published.

== Works ==
- Kallistratova, Sofia (July–September 1977). "Comments on the draft Constitution". A Chronicle of Human Rights in the USSR (27): 56–64.
