= Inna Meiman-Kitrossky =

Soviet philologist (1932–1987)

Inna Ilyinichna Meiman-Kitrossky
- Инна Ильинична Китросская-Мейман
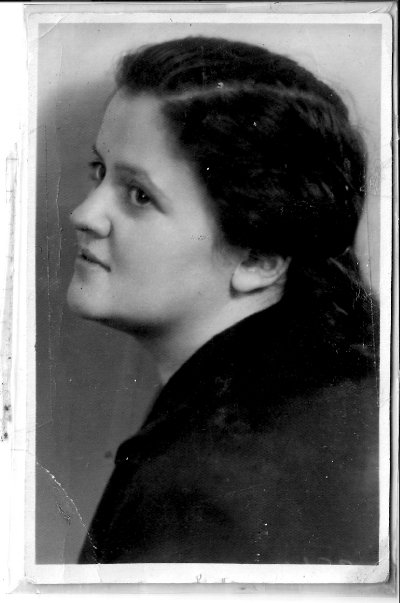
- Born: Inna Ilyinichna Fuxson; October 16, 1932; Moscow, Soviet Union
- Died: February 9, 1987 (aged 54); Georgetown, Washington, D.C.
- Education: Moscow State Linguistic University
- Occupation: teaching foreign languages
- Known for: Refusenik
- Spouses: Naum Aaronovich Kitrossky, Naum Natanovich Meiman
- Children: Lev Naumovich Kitrossky
- Parent(s): Ilya Naumovich Fuxson, Khasya Samuilovna Fuxson

Inna Ilyinichna Meiman-Kitrossky (Russian: И́нна Ильи́нична Китро́сская-Ме́йман, 16 October 1932, Moscow – 9 February 1987, Georgetown, Washington, D.C.) was a refusenik, a member of a group of refuseniks-cancer patients, and an author of textbooks for the English language.

== Life ==
Inna Meiman was born as Ina Fuxson in a Jewish family in Moscow, and graduated from Moscow State Linguistic University, where she worked for many years teaching English. This experience resulted in being awarded a Ph.D. and also in two textbooks: Russian: Английский язык как второй иностранный (начальный курс) (English as a second foreign language (basic level)), Russian: Современный английский язык (продвинутый этап)) (Modern English (advanced level)), which was in usage in several Russian Universities. Meiman also translated from English to Russian and vice versa. She was married for several years and had a son.

In 1979, she applied for an exit visa for the first time, but after two years of waiting, she was refused. In 1981, she married the refusenik and activist for human rights, Naum Meiman, and became active in this field as well. She also started to teach Russian to foreigners, including the personnel of the US embassy. The Meimans were under surveillance by the KGB, which disconnected the telephone in Meiman's flat and also searched their home.

In 1983, she was diagnosed with cancer which progressed quickly, requiring several surgeries. Naum Meiman worked hard to enable his wife to go abroad for treatment. Inna Meiman then joined the group of refuseniks-cancer patients. A campaign to help her gradually accelerated, which was joined by US Senators Gary Hart and Paul Simon. Inna Meiman met many people from abroad, and gave an interview to foreign TV. A young American student Lisa Paul, who was very impressed by Inna, held a 25-day hunger strike to bring attention to her case.

In 1987, at the inception of Perestroika, she was finally allowed to leave. Inna Meiman arrived in the US, but died after several weeks in February 1987 in Georgetown (Washington, D.C.). Naum Meiman was not allowed to attend her funeral in Washington D.C.

25 years later, Lisa Paul published a book of memoirs about Inna Meiman. Inna's Meiman life is a dramatic episode in the history of the refusenik movement and helped to expose the internal policy of the Soviet Union in the latter part of its existence. Naum Meiman died in Tel-Aviv, Israel in 2001. Inna's son and seven grandchildren have lived in Israel since 1987.
