= Lyudmila Alexeyeva =

Soviet-Russian human rights activist (1927–2018)

- Людмила Алексеева
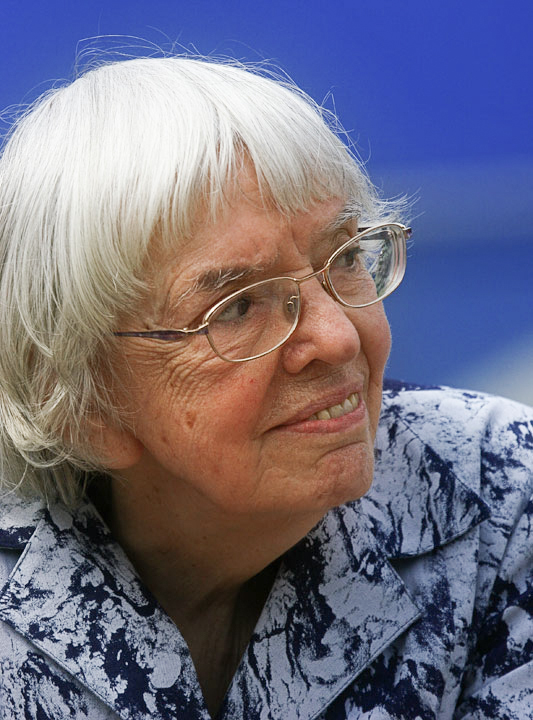
- Alexeyeva in 2005
- Born: Lyudmila Mikhaylovna Alexeyeva; 20 July 1927; Yevpatoria, Crimean ASSR, Russian SFSR, Soviet Union
- Died: 8 December 2018 (aged 91); Moscow, Russia
- Citizenship: Soviet Union (1927–1977); United States (1982–2018); Russia (1991–2018)
- Education: the MSU Faculty of History, the graduate school of the Moscow State University of Economics, Statistics, and Informatics
- Occupations: Russian historian, activist, chairwomen of the Moscow Helsinki Watch Group
- Known for: Human rights activism with participation in the Moscow Helsinki Group
- Movement: Moscow Helsinki Group, Strategy-31, other rights-related movements
- Spouse: Nikolay Williams
- Awards: State Prize of the Russian Federation, Order of Merit of the Federal Republic of Germany, Olof Palme Prize, Légion d'honneur, Order of the Lithuanian Grand Duke Gediminas, Order of the Cross of Terra Mariana, Sakharov Prize

Lyudmila Alexeyeva's voice
Recorded in October 2012

Lyudmila Mikhaylovna Alexeyeva (Russian: Людми́ла Миха́йловна Алексе́ева, IPA: [lʲʊˈdmʲilə ɐlʲɪˈksʲeɪvə]; 20 July 1927 – 8 December 2018) was a Russian historian and human-rights activist who was a founding member in 1976 of the Moscow Helsinki Watch Group and one of the last Soviet dissidents active in post-Soviet Russia.

== Biography ==
=== Soviet period ===
In April 1968, Alexeyeva was expelled from the Communist Party and fired from her job at the publishing house. Nonetheless, she continued her activities in defense of human rights. From 1968 to 1972 she worked clandestinely as a typist for the first underground bulletin The Chronicle of Current Events devoted to human rights violations in the USSR.

In February 1977, Alexeyeva fled from the USSR to the United States following a crackdown against members of The Chronicle by Soviet authorities. In the US Alexeyeva continued to advocate for human rights improvements in Russia and worked on a freelance basis for Radio Free Europe/Radio Liberty and Voice of America. She became a US citizen in 1982. She wrote regularly on the Soviet dissident movement for both English and Russian language publications in the US and elsewhere, and in 1985 she published the first comprehensive monograph on the history of the movement, Soviet Dissent (Wesleyan University Press). In addition, after moving to the United States, Alexeyeva took up freelance radio journalism for Radio Liberty and the Russian language section of the Voice of America. In 1990 she published The Thaw Generation, an autobiography that described the formation of the Soviet dissident movement and was co-written with Paul Goldberg.

=== Return to Russia ===
In 1989 she restarted the Moscow Helsinki Group following its dissolution in 1982. In 1993, after the dissolution of the Soviet Union, she returned to Russia, and she became a chairperson of the Moscow Helsinki Group in 1996. In 2000, Alexeyeva joined a commission set up to advise President Vladimir Putin on human rights issues, a move that triggered criticism from some other rights activists.

Alexeyeva was critical of the Kremlin's human rights record and accused the government of numerous human rights violations including the regular prohibitions of non-violent meetings and demonstrations and encouragement of extremists with its nationalistic policies, such as the mass deportations of Georgians in 2006 and police raids against foreigners working in street markets. She has also criticized the law enforcers' conduct in Ingushetia and has warned that growing violence in the republic may spread to the whole Russian Federation. In 2006, she was accused by the Russian authorities of involvement with British intelligence and received threats from nationalist groups.

=== Strategy-31 ===
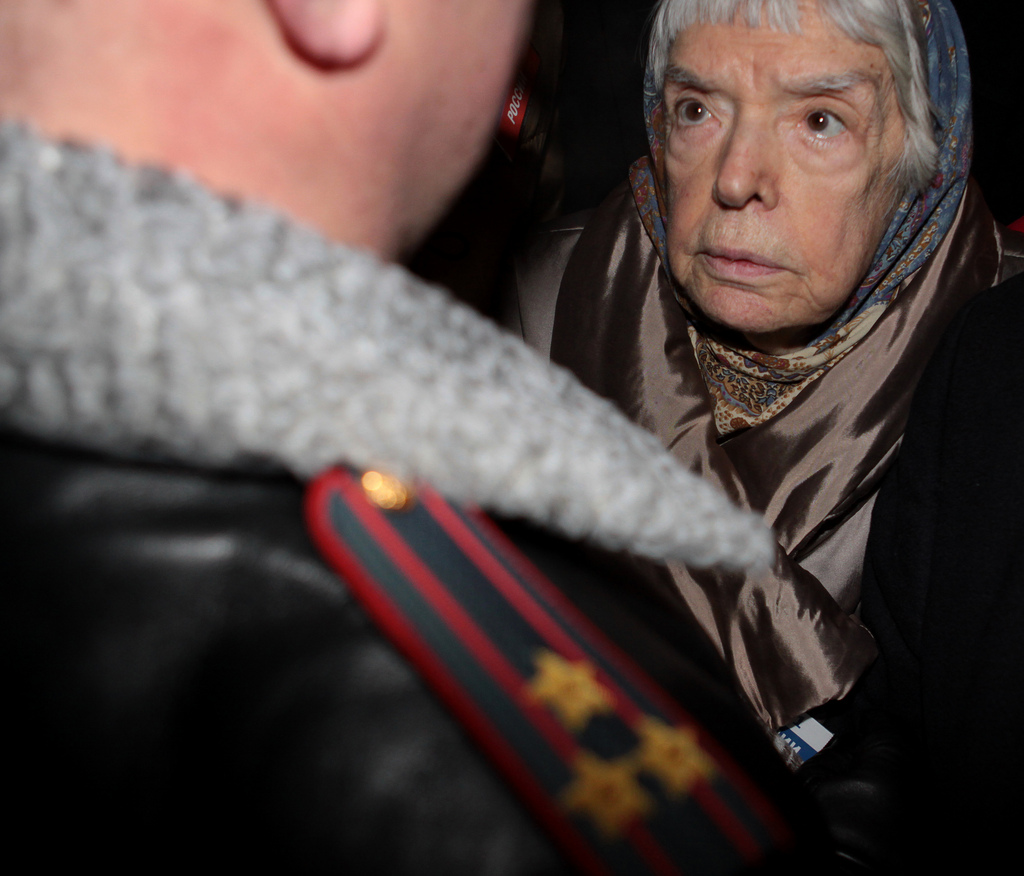
Alexeyeva in the Strategy-31 protest, 2010

From August 31, 2009, Alexeyeva was an active participant in Strategy-31 – the regular protest rallies of citizens on Moscow's Triumfalnaya Square in defense of the 31st Article (On the Freedom of Assembly) of the Russian Constitution. On December 31, 2009, during one of these attempted protests, Alexeyeva was detained by the riot police (OMON) and taken with scores of others to a police station. This event provoked strong reaction in Russia and abroad. Jerzy Buzek, the President of the European Parliament, was "deeply disappointed and shocked" at the treatment of Alexeyeva and others by the police. The National Security Council of the United States expressed "dismay" at the detentions. The New York Times published a front-page article about the protest rally ("Tested by Many Foes, Passion of a Russian Dissident Endures").

On March 30, 2010, Alexeyeva was assaulted in the Park Kultury metro station by a man as she was paying respect to the victims of the 2010 Moscow Metro Bombings. At the Lake Seliger youth camp, the Nashi youth movement branded her "a Nazi" and an enemy of the Russian people.

Alexeyeva was opposed to the 2014 Russian annexation of her native Crimea, saying "that the seizure of Crimea has shamed my country." On her 90th birthday she was visited at her home by Russian president Vladimir Putin (accompanied by a cameraman), despite her longstanding criticism of him.

She died in a Moscow hospital on 8 December 2018. No cause was given. Alexeyeva's last words for publication were written to celebrate the seventieth anniversary of the Universal Declaration of Human Rights, although she actually died two days short of that anniversary. She lamented the weakening of civil society through state propaganda and manipulation, and she drew attention to the weakness of legal culture and of democratic institutions in contemporary Russia, as well as political cynicism and populism which - not just in Russia - treat carelessly the systems and institutions necessary to support human values.

== Awards and prizes ==
Alexeyeva received the following awards and prizes for her human rights activities:

- 2004 — Olof Palme Prize
- 2005 — Person of the Year Prize of the Federation of the Jewish Communities of Russia
- 2007 — The Order of the French Legion of Honour (Ordre national de la Légion d'honneur)
- 2009 — The Order of Merit of the Federal Republic of Germany (Großes Verdienstkreuz der Bundesrepublik Deutschland)
- 2009 — Sakharov Prize for Freedom of Thought
- 2012 — The Order of the Cross of Terra Mariana, 3rd class
- 2015 — The Václav Havel Human Rights Prize
- 2017 — State Prize of the Russian Federation

== Books, articles and interviews ==
- "Statement of Lyudmila Alekseeva and Lidia Voronina, accompanied by Edward Kline" (PDF). Basket III: implementation of the Helsinki Accords. Hearings before the Commission on Security and Cooperation in Europe. Ninety-fifth congress. First session on implementation of the Helsinki Accords. Vol. IV. Washington, D.C.: U.S. Government Printing Office. 1977. pp. 29–39. Archived (PDF) from the original on 23 November 2015.
- Alexeyeva, Ludmilla (Autumn 1977). "The human rights movement in the USSR". Survey. 23 (4): 72–85. ISSN 0039-6192.
- Alexeyeva, Lyudmila; Bukovsky, Vladimir; Amalrik, Andrei; Voikhanskaya, Marina; Plyushch, Leonid; Elina, Emilia; Voronina, Lidia; Bresenden, Yevgeniy (November 1977). "The Orlov tribunal". Index on Censorship. 6 (6): 52–60. doi:10.1080/03064227708532716. S2CID 143045934.
- Alexeyeva, Lyudmila; Grigorenko, Pyotr; Amalrik, Andrei; Kaminskaya, Dina; Simes, Konstantin; Williams, Nikolai; Litvinov, Pavel; Litvinova, Maya; Sadomskaya, Natalya; Chalidze, Valery; Shragin, Boris; Stain, Yuri (2013) [1978]. "В защиту Анатолия Марченко" [In defense of Anatoly Marchenko]. Kontinent (in Russian). 152.
- Alekseeva, Liudmila (1980). The diversity of Soviet dissent: ideologies, goals and direction, 1965–1980.
- Алексеева, Людмила (2013) [1979]. "Путеводитель по аду психиатрических тюрем" [The guidebook to the hell of psychiatric prisons]. Kontinent (in Russian) (152).
- Alexeyeva, Lyudmila (December 1982). "USSR: prisoners' rights denied". Index on Censorship. 11 (6): 31–33. doi:10.1080/03064228208533458. S2CID 220932456.
- Alexeeva, Ludmilla; Chalidze, Valery (1985). Mass rioting in the USSR. Silver Spring. Foundation for Soviet Studies.
- Alekseeva, Liudmila (September 1986). US broadcasting to the Soviet Union (A Helsinki watch report). Human Rights Watch. ISBN 978-0938579878.
- Shcharansky, Anatoly; Bonner, Yelena; Alexeyeva, Ludmilla (26 June 1986). "The tenth year of the Watch". The New York Review of Books.
- Alexeyeva, Ludmilla (1987). Soviet dissent: contemporary movements for national, religious, and human rights. Wesleyan University Press. ISBN 978-0-8195-6176-3.
- Alekseeva, Liudmila (1987). Cruel & unusual punishment: forced labor in today's U.S.S.R. AFL-CIO Dept. of International Affairs. ASIN B00073BWLG.
- Landy, Joanne; Alexeyeva, Ludmilla; Bastian, Gert; Daneker, Gail; Duncan, Polly; et al. (18 February 1988). "Release Juris Bumeisters". The New York Review of Books.
- Alexeyeva, Ludmilla; Arutunyan, Shagan; Arutunyan, Marzpet; Aristanyan, Vartan; Borisov, Vladimir; et al. (21 July 1988). "An Armenian in prison". The New York Review of Books.
- Alexeyeva, Ludmilla; Goldberg, Paul (1990). The thaw generation: coming of age in the post-Stalin era. Pittsburgh: University of Pittsburgh Press. ISBN 978-0822959113.
- Alekseeva, Liudmila (February 1990). Civil society in the USSR (A Helsinki watch report). Helsinki Watch. ISBN 978-0929692425.
- Alexeyeva, Lyudmila (March 1990). "Unrest in the Soviet Union". The Washington Quarterly. 13 (1): 63–77. doi:10.1080/01636609009477532.
- Bayefsky, Anne; Alexeyeva, Ludmilla; Kampelman, Max; Tabory, Mala; Maresca, John; Henkin, Alice (28–31 March 1990). "Human Rights: The Helsinki Process". Proceedings of the Annual Meeting (American Society of International Law). 84: 113–130. JSTOR 25658533.
- Алексеева, Людмила (1992). История инакомыслия в СССР: новейший период. Вильнюс—Москва: Весть. ISBN 9785984400268. (The Russian text of the book in full is available online on the Memorial website by click)
- Alexeyeva, Ludmilla (1998). "Mustafa Dzhemilev, his character and convictions". In Allworth, Edward (ed.). Tatars of the Crimea. Return to the homeland. Durham: Duke University Press. pp. 210–211. ISBN 978-0822319948.
- Alexeeva, Lyudmila (2000). "Private measures by which to ensure fundamental rights in present-day Russia: a view from inside". Helsinki Monitor. 11 (2): 23–32. doi:10.1163/157181400X00292.
- Alexeyeva, Lyudmila (10 June 2004). "Is this Putin's definition of democracy?". The Moscow Times.
- Alexeyeva, Ludmilla (13 October 2010). "Article by Ludmila Alexeeva". OSCE Magazine.
- Alexeyeva, Lyudmila (15 December 2010). "The rise and fall of Putinism". The Moscow Times.
- Alexeeva, Lyudmila (24 May 2013). "Vladimir Putin's goal is to destroy Russian civil society". The Guardian.
- Alexeyeva, Lyudmila; Schepp, Matthias; Thaler, Claudia (17 July 2013). "Interview: Putin turning Russia 'into a police state'". Der Spiegel.
- Alekseeva, Lyudmila (2013). "Interview with Melanie Ilick and Emilia Kosterina, 29 July 2011". In Ilic, Melanie (ed.). Life stories of Soviet women: the interwar generation. Routledge. pp. 14–32. ISBN 978-1135094713.
- Гальперович, Данила (4 August 2014). "Западные санкции: стоит ли загонять Кремль в угол? Людмила Алексеева, Владимир Буковский и Мария Липман рассуждают об этом в интервью "Голосу Америки"" [Western sanctions: Should the Kremlin be forced into a corner? Lyudmila Alexeyeva, Vladimir Bukovsky and Mariya Lipman discuss that in their interview to Voice of America] (in Russian). Voice of America.
- Гальперович, Данила (10 December 2015). "Людмила Алексеева: у нас – плохо управляемое государство, в котором люди мучаются" [Lyudmila Alexeyeva: we have a poorly managed state in which people suffer] (in Russian). Voice of America.
- Зубов, Михаил (28 April 2015). "Как Владимир Буковский победил карательную психиатрию. Людмила Алексеева: "Вряд ли эта легендарная фигура занимается детским порно"" [How Vladimir Bukovsky defeated punitive psychiatry. Ludmilla Alexeyeva, "This legendary figure is hardly engaged in child pornography"]. Moskovskij Komsomolets (in Russian).
- "Ludmilla Alexeeva: 'Russia is moving away from Europe'". Deutsche Welle.
