= Moscow Helsinki Group =

Russian human rights organisation

- Московская Хельсинкская группа
- Formation: 12 May 1976; 50 years ago
- Founder: Yuri Orlov and others
- Dissolved: 25 January 2023; 3 years ago
- Type: Non-profit, NGO
- Legal status: Defunct
- Purpose: Monitoring and protection of human rights
- Headquarters: 22/1 Bolshoy Golovin Lane, Moscow, Russia
- Chair (1976–1982): Yuri Orlov
- Chair (1989–1994): Larisa Bogoraz
- Chair (1994–1996): Kronid Lyubarsky
- Chair (1996–2018): Lyudmila Alexeyeva (from 2019 three co-chairs)
- Parent organization: Helsinki Committee for Human Rights
- Subsidiaries: Working Commission to Investigate the Use of Psychiatry for Political Purposes
- Website: www.mhg.ru

The Moscow Helsinki Group (also known as the Moscow Helsinki Watch Group, Russian: Московская Хельсинкская группа, romanized: Moskovskaya Khel'sinkskaya gruppa) was one of Russia's leading human rights organisations. It was originally set up in 1976 to monitor Soviet compliance with the Helsinki Accords and to report to the West on Soviet human rights abuses. It had been forced out of existence in the early 1980s, but was revived in 1989 and continued to operate in Russia.

In the 1970s, Moscow Helsinki Group inspired the formation of similar groups in other Warsaw Pact countries and support groups in the West. Within the former Soviet Union Helsinki Watch Groups were founded in Ukraine, Lithuania, Georgia and Armenia, as well as in the United States (Helsinki Watch, later Human Rights Watch). Similar initiatives sprung up in countries such as Czechoslovakia, with Charter 77. Eventually, the Helsinki monitoring groups inspired by the Moscow Helsinki Group formed the International Helsinki Federation.

In late December 2022 the Russian Ministry of Justice filed a court order to dissolve the organization. On 25 January 2023, during the Russian invasion of Ukraine, the Moscow City Court ruled that the Moscow Helsinki Group must be dissolved citing group's activities outside of its region, Moscow.

== Founding and goals ==
On 1 August 1975, the Soviet Union became one of the 35 nations to sign the Helsinki Accords during the Conference on Security and Cooperation in Europe in Helsinki, Finland. Although the Soviet Union had signed the Accords primarily due to foreign policy considerations, it ultimately accepted a text containing unprecedented human rights provisions. The so-called "Third Basket" of the Accords obliged the signatories to "respect human rights and fundamental freedoms, including freedom of thought, conscience, religion or belief." The signatories also confirmed "the right of the individual to know and act upon his rights and duties in this field."

The "Public Group to Promote Fulfillment of the Helsinki Accords in the USSR" was the idea of physicist Yuri Orlov, based on previous one-and-a-half-decade-old experience of dissent. Taking advantage of international publicity of the Helsinki Accords and contacts to Western journalists, on 12 May 1976 Orlov announced the formation of the Moscow Helsinki Group at a press-conference held at the apartment of Andrei Sakharov.

The newly inaugurated Moscow Helsinki Group was to monitor Soviet compliance with the human rights provisions of the Helsinki Final Act. In its founding statement, the Group announced its goal to inform the heads of the signatory states as well as the world public "about cases of direct violations" of the Helsinki Accords. It announced that it would accept information on violations of these articles from citizens and compile documents on them.

Apart from Yuri Orlov, the Group's founding members were Anatoly Shcharansky, Lyudmila Alekseeva, Alexander Korchak, Malva Landa, Vitaly Rubin, Yelena Bonner, Alexander Ginzburg, Anatoly Marchenko, Petro Grigorenko, and Mikhail Bernshtam. Ten other people, including Sofia Kalistratova, Naum Meiman, Yuri Mnyukh, Viktor Nekipelov, Tatiana Osipova, Feliks Serebrov, Vladimir Slepak, Leonard Ternovsky, and Yuri Yarym-Agaev joined the Group later.

The composition of the Moscow Helsinki Group was a deliberate attempt to bring together a diverse set of leading dissidents, and worked as a bridge between human rights activists, those focused on the rights of refuseniks and national minorities or on religious and economic issues, as well as between workers and intellectuals.

== Activities ==
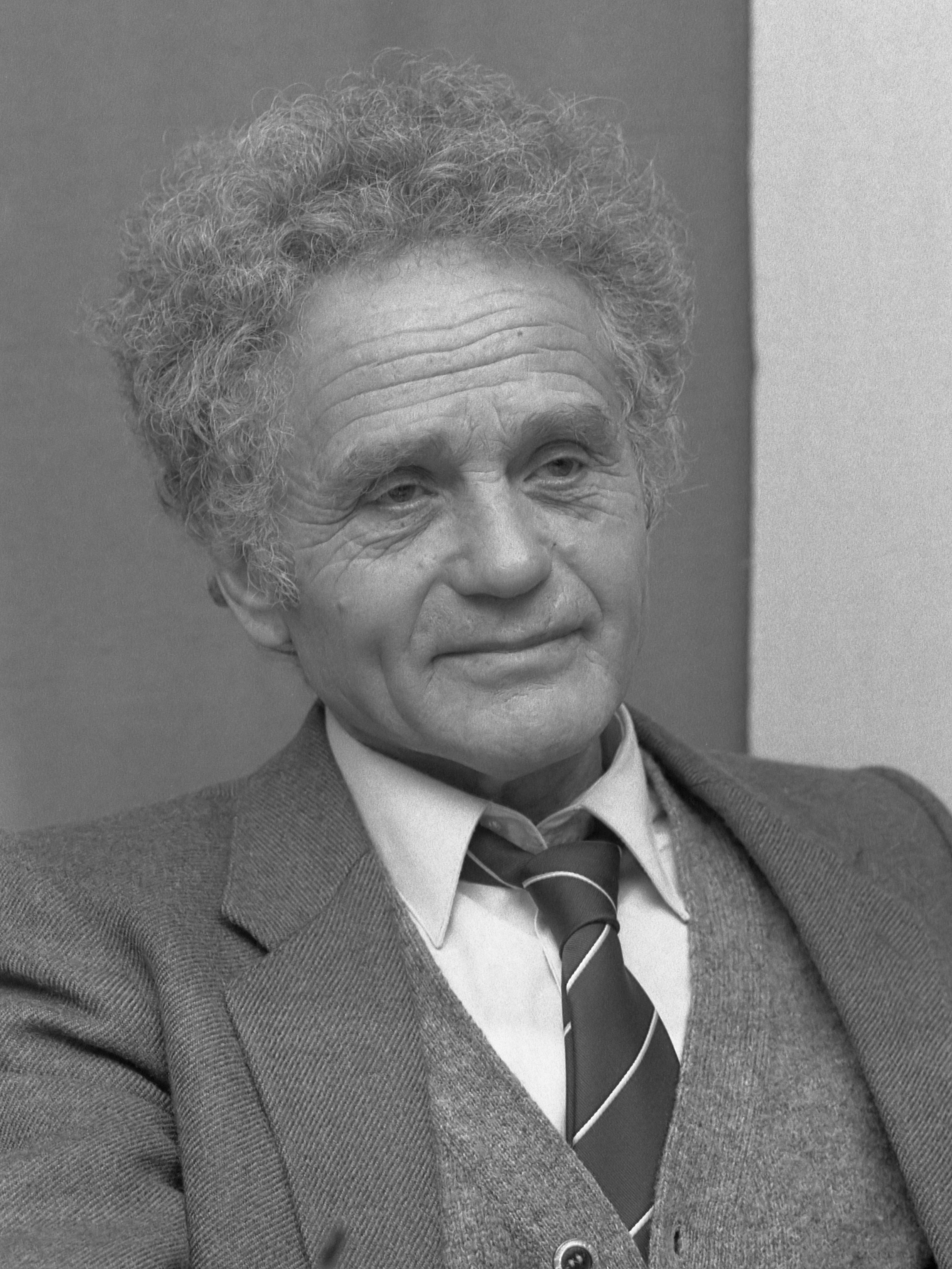
Yuri Orlov, a founder of the Moscow Helsinki Group, in 1986

Western radio stations such Voice of America and Radio Liberty helped disseminate news about the creation of the Moscow Helsinki Group, leading to relatively broad awareness throughout the Soviet Union. Soviet citizens who learned about the existence of the group passed on written complaints to members, or in many cases found a group member in person to report a firsthand case of abuse when in Moscow. The members of the Helsinki group also traveled throughout the Soviet Union to conduct research on compliance with the Helsinki Final Act.

After verifying the complaint, when possible, the Group would issue reports on the violations they observed. The reports typically included a survey of a specific case, followed by a discussion of the human rights violations relevant to the Helsinki and other international accords as well as the Soviet constitution and law. The documents closed with a call for action by the signatory states.

The Helsinki Group would then campaign internationally by passing on the reports on the violations for publication abroad, calling for intervention by the other signatory states. The Group's strategy was to make thirty-five copies of each document and send them by registered mail to the thirty-four Moscow embassies affiliated with the CSCE and directly to Leonid Brezhnev. Moscow Helsinki Group members also met with foreign correspondents to reach audiences beyond the Soviet Union. Western journalists, in particular those posted to Moscow bureaus or working for the Voice of America or Radio Liberty, also disseminated the information and were essential to the development of a broader Helsinki network. The CSCE translated all documents it received and forwarded them to other CSCE states and interested groups. The Group's complaints would also be forwarded for review at the international follow-up meetings to Helsinki, including the 1977 Belgrade meeting and the 1980 meeting in Madrid.

In addition, the documents and appeals were circulated via samizdat. Many documents that reached the West were republished in periodicals such as the Cahiers du Samizdat and the Samizdat Bulletin.

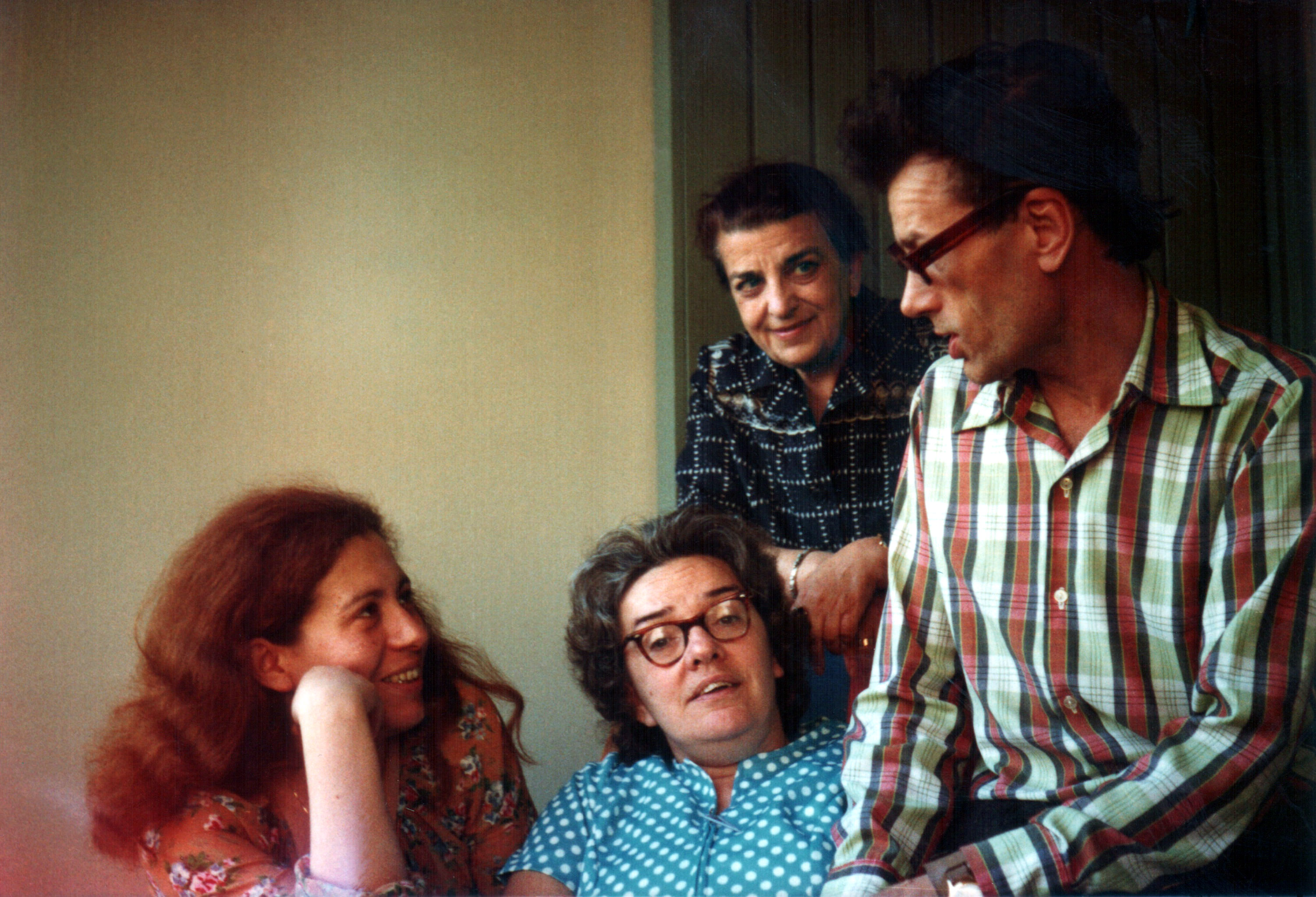
Moscow Helsinki Group members Yuliya Vishnevskya, Lyudmila Alexeyeva, Dina Kaminskaya and Kronid Lyubarsky in Munich, 1978

Over time, the Group's documents focused on a wide range of issues, including national self-determination, the right to choose one's residence, emigration and the right of return, freedom of belief, the right to monitor human rights, the right to a fair trial, the rights of political prisoners, and the abuse of psychiatry.

In the six years of its existence in the Soviet Union, the Moscow Helsinki Group compiled a total of 195 such reports. Between 12 May 1976 and 6 September 1982, when the last three members who were not imprisoned announced the Group would discontinue its work, the Group also compiled numerous appeals to the signatory states, trade unions in the United States, Canada, Europe, and the world public.

== Working Commission on Psychiatry for Political Purposes ==
In January 1977, Alexander Podrabinek along with a 47-year-old self-educated worker Feliks Serebrov, a 30-year-old computer programmer Vyacheslav Bakhmin and Irina Kuplun established the Working Commission to Investigate the Use of Psychiatry for Political Purposes. The Commission was formally linked to and constituted as an offshoot of the Moscow Helsinki Group. It was composed of five open members and several anonymous ones, including a few psychiatrists who, at great danger to themselves, conducted their own independent examinations of cases of alleged psychiatric abuse.

The members of the Working Commission were subjected to various terms and types of punishments. Alexander Podrabinek was sentenced to five years' internal exile, Irina Grivnina to five years' internal exile, Vyacheslav Bakhmin to three years in a labour camp, Dr Leonard Ternovsky to three years' labour camp, Dr Anatoly Koryagin to eight years’ imprisonment and labour camp and four years’ internal exile, Dr Alexander Voloshanovich was sent to voluntary exile.

== Persecution ==
Members of the Moscow Helsinki Group were threatened by the KGB, imprisoned, exiled or forced to emigrate. In 1977, KGB head Yuri Andropov said: "The need has thus emerged to terminate the actions of Orlov, fellow Helsinki monitor Alexander Ginzburg and others once and for all, on the basis of existing law."

The first arrests of members of the Moscow Helsinki Group were carried out by Soviet authorities in early 1977. They followed an explosion in the Moscow metro on 8 January, after the Soviet press linked dissidents to the attack. Following the attack, Andrei Sakharov accused the KGB of a deliberate attempt to discredit dissidents in order to facilitate their persecution. The Moscow and Ukrainian Helsinki Groups and the Russian section of Amnesty International issued a joint statement denying any participation in the attack and emphasized their adherence to the principle of non-violent protest.

During the following year, a number of members were sentenced to prison camps, incarcerated in psychiatric institutions, and sent into internal exile within the USSR:

- Yuri Orlov - sentenced on 18 May 1978 to seven years in strict-regime camps followed by five years of internal exile for "anti-Soviet agitation and propaganda" (Article 70, RSFSR Criminal Code);
- Vladimir Slepak - sentenced on 21 June 1978 to five years' internal exile for "malicious hooliganism" (Article 206);
- Anatoly Shcharansky - sentenced on 14 July 1978 to three years in prison and 10 years in strict-regime camps for "anti-Soviet agitation and propaganda" (Article 70) and "Treason" (Article 64-a). In October 1981 he was sentenced to return to prison for a further three years;
- Malva Landa - sentenced on 26 March 1980 to five years' internal exile for "anti-Soviet fabrications" (Article 190-1);
- Viktor Nekipelov - sentenced on 13 June 1980 to seven years in labour camps and five years' internal exile for "anti-Soviet agitation and propaganda" (Article 70);
- Leonard Ternovsky (also a member of the Psychiatric Working Group) - sentenced on 30 December 1980 to three years in ordinary-regime camps for "anti-Soviet fabrications" (Article 190-1);
- Feliks Serebrov (also a member of the Psychiatric Working Group) - sentenced on 21 July 1981, to four years in strict-regime camps plus five years' exile for "anti-Soviet agitation and propaganda" (Article 70). Earlier sentenced in 1977 to one year in the camps;
- Tatiana Osipova - sentenced on 2 April 1981 to five years in strict-regime camps and five years' internal exile for "anti-Soviet agitation and propaganda" (Article 70);
- Anatoly Marchenko - sentenced on 4 September 1981 to ten years in special-regime camps plus five years' internal exile for "anti-Soviet agitation and propaganda" (Article 70);
- Ivan Kovalev was sentenced on 2 April 1982, to five years of strict-regime camps plus five years' internal exile for "anti-Soviet agitation and propaganda" (Article 70).

The Soviet authorities encouraged other activists to emigrate. Lyudmila Alexeyeva left the Soviet Union in February 1977. Founding members of the Moscow Helsinki Group emigrated - Mikhail Bernshtam, Alexander Korchak and Vitaly Rubin. Pyotr Grigorenko was stripped of his Soviet citizenship in November 1977 while seeking medical treatment abroad.

By the early 1980s, the members of the Moscow Helsinki Group were scattered between prisons, camps and exile in the USSR, while others lived abroad. At the end of 1981 only Elena Bonner, Sofia Kalistratova and Naum Meiman remained free. The dissolution of the Moscow Helsinki Group was officially announced by Elena Bonner on 8 September 1982. At this time, legal action had already been taken against the 75-year-old Sofia Kalistratova and there was a direct threat of her arrest.

== Helsinki network ==
The Moscow Helsinki Group became the center of the new network of humanitarian protest in the USSR. Following the formation of the Moscow Helsinki Group, Helsinki watch groups were formed in Lithuania (November 1976), Ukraine (November 1976), Georgia (January 1977) and Armenia (April 1977). Other protest groups announced their formation at press conferences held by the Moscow Helsinki Group, such as the Working Commission to Investigate the Use of Psychiatry for Political Purposes, the Christian Committee for the Defense of the Rights of Religious Believers, and other associations.

In June 1976, the group's appeal to U.S. congresswoman Millicent Fenwick persuaded her to lead the creation of the U.S. Helsinki Commission (see the Commission on Security and Cooperation in Europe), which included senators, congress members, and representatives from the State, Defense, and Commerce Departments.

In 1978, Helsinki Watch was founded in the U.S. The private NGO became the most influential Western NGO devoted to Helsinki monitoring. Its mandate was to produce reports on human rights abuses in the Soviet Union, Eastern Europe, and the United States, first of all for the next meeting of the Conference on Security and Cooperation in Europe (CSCE) which was due to open in Madrid in 1980. In 1988, Helsinki Watch evolved into Human Rights Watch.

In 1982, the Helsinki monitoring groups of Austria, Belgium, Canada, France, Netherlands, Norway, Sweden and the United States formed the International Helsinki Federation.

== Rebirth ==
In July 1989, the Moscow Helsinki Group was re-established by human rights activists Vyacheslav Bakhmin, Larisa Bogoraz, Sergei Kovalev, Alexey Smirnov, Lev Timofeev, and Boris Zolotukhin. Other prominent members are Yuri Orlov, Lyudmila Alexeyeva, Henri Reznik, Lev Ponomarev, and Aleksei Simonov.

The chair of the re-established Moscow Helsinki Group was Larisa Bogoraz, followed in 1994 by Kronid Lubarsky. In May 1996, Lyudmila Alexeyeva (who returned from emigration in 1993) became its head, leading it until her death in 2018. In November 1998, she was also elected president of the International Helsinki Federation for Human Rights.

== 2010s and 2020s ==
In 2012, the Moscow Helsinki Group renounced foreign funding and connections in order to avoid being labeled as a foreign agent in compliance with the Russian foreign agent law.

In 2015, the Moscow Helsinki Group continued fighting against being labeled as a "foreign agent".

As of 2021, MHG is co-chaired by two participants of the Soviet-era dissident movement - Vyacheslav Bakhmin (political prisoner in 1980-84) and Valery Borshchyov (formerly Duma deputy from the opposition Yabloko party). Two of its main projects include: annual reports on the human rights situation in Russia; monitoring police activities; and educational programs. In September 2021, MHG issued a statement denouncing the non-transparency of electronic voting used in the preceding elections to the Duma and urging Russia's board of elections to cancel electronic voting results.

=== Dissolution ===
On 20 December 2022 the Russian Justice Ministry filed a court order seeking to dissolve the organization. The Justice Ministry claimed that the organization's own charters do not meet the requirements of the law and authorities alleged that they also prohibit it from defending human rights outside of Moscow, which co-chair Valery Borshchyov dismissed as "nonsense". Borshchyov described the dissolution, which was ordered on 25 January, as "a serious blow to the human rights movement not only in Russia but also the world".

== Criticism ==
Opinions differed as to the effectiveness and impact of the revived Moscow Helsinki Group. In the late 1980s and early 1990s it was no longer alone, but one among a variety of new organisations (Memorial, For Human Rights, the Glasnost Defence Foundation) that were engaged in defending human rights and freedom of expression, and carrying out missions to hot-spots in different parts of the USSR and, later, in Russia (above all, Chechnya).

Human rights activist Sergei Grigoryants, founder of the Glasnost periodical, was particularly scathing. Instead of the heroic and sacrificial traditions of the original Helsinki Groups, the re-established body was an intelligentsia-oriented elite club, forgotten by all. In 2001 he described it as "the most servile and pro-government" among NGOs then existing in Russia.

== Publications ==
- A thematic survey of the documents of the Moscow Helsinki Group. Based on materials by Lyudmila Alekseeva, Moscow Helsinki Group representative. Translated and edited by the staff of the CSCE Commission. Washington, D.C.: Commission on Security and Cooperation in Europe, Congress of the United States. 1981.
- Documents of the Helsinki Watch Group in the USSR, No 1–8. New York: Commission on security and cooperation in Europe. 1977–1984.
- Документы Московской Хельсинкской Группы 1976–1982 [Documents of the Moscow Helsinki Group 1976–1982] (PDF) (in Russian). Moscow: Moscow Helsinki Group. 2006. Archived from the original (PDF) on 6 August 2006. (publicly available unabridged Russian text)
