= Bazar, Ukraine =

Coordinates: 51°02′54″N 29°17′45″E

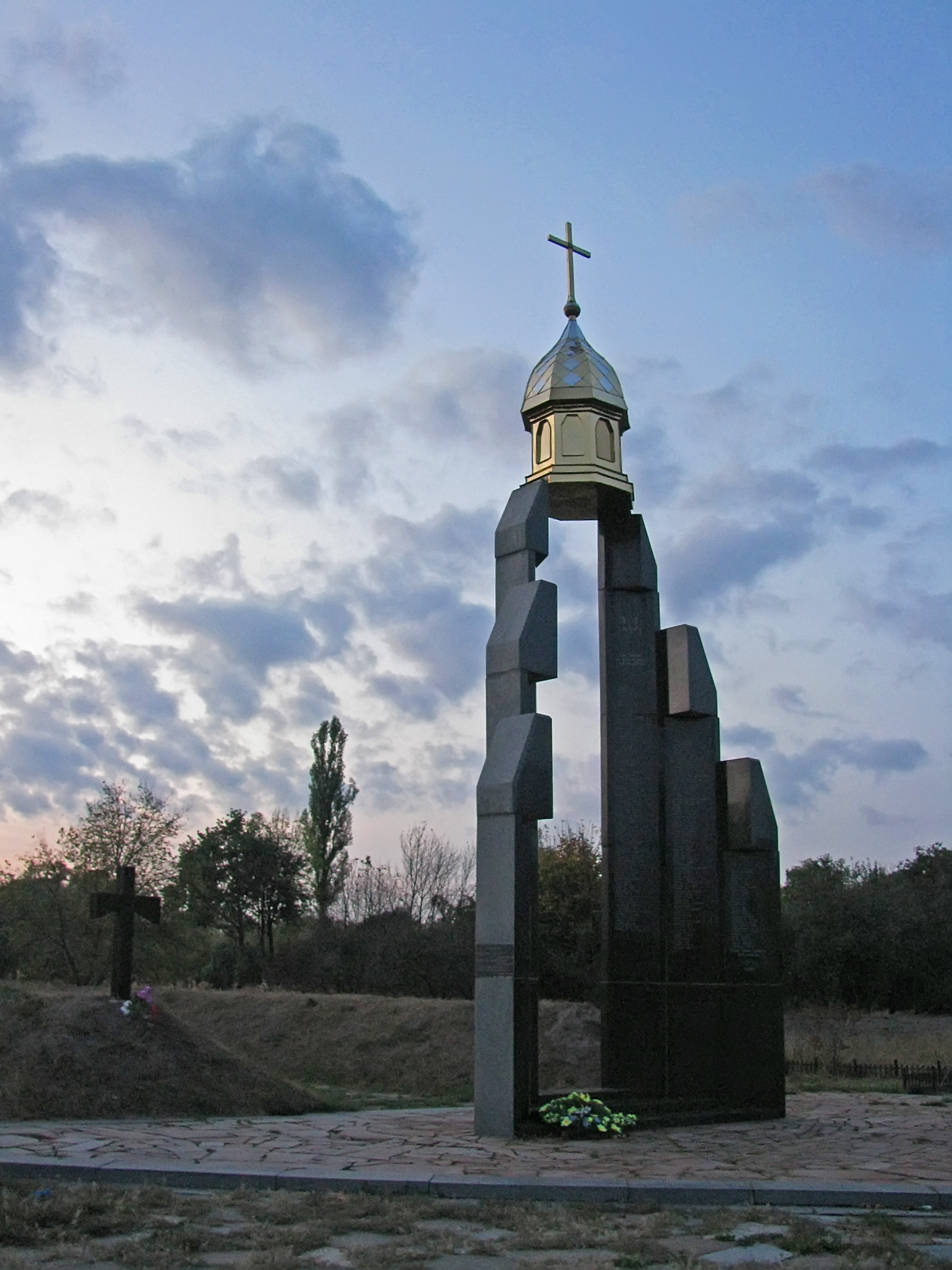
Bazar UNR memorial

Bazar (Ukrainian: Базар) is a village, a former town, in Korosten Raion of Zhytomyr Oblast, northern Ukraine, which suffered from the Chernobyl disaster with some populated places abandoned, after population evacuated and relocated.

== History ==
Bazar is best known for the execution on November 21, 1921, of 359 soldiers of the Ukrainian People's Army, who refused to defect to the Red Army, during the final stages of the Second Winter Campaign. In 1941, an attempt was organised by Oleh Kandyba Olzhych to create a memorial to the fallen, however this was prevented by mass arrests by the occupying Nazi forces.
