= Soviet dissidents =

Opponents of Soviet ideology

Soviet dissidents were people who disagreed with certain features of Soviet ideology or with its entirety and who were willing to speak out against them. The term dissident was used in the Soviet Union (USSR) in the period from the mid-1960s until the Fall of Communism. It was used to refer to small groups of marginalized intellectuals whose challenges, from modest to radical to the Soviet regime, met protection and encouragement from correspondents, and typically criminal prosecution or other forms of silencing by the authorities. Following the etymology of the term, a dissident is considered to "sit apart" from the regime. As dissenters began self-identifying as dissidents, the term came to refer to an individual whose non-conformism was perceived to be for the good of a society. The most influential subset of the dissidents is known as the Soviet human rights movement.

Political opposition in the USSR was barely visible, and apart from rare exceptions, it had little consequence, primarily because it was instantly crushed with brute force. Instead, an important element of dissident activity in the Soviet Union was informing society (both inside the USSR and in foreign countries) about violation of laws and human rights and organizing in defense of those rights. Over time, the dissident movement created vivid awareness of Soviet Communist abuses.

Soviet dissidents who criticized the state in most cases faced legal sanctions under the Soviet Criminal Code and the choice between exile abroad (with revocation of their Soviet citizenship), the mental hospital, or the labor camp. Anti-Soviet political behavior, in particular, being outspoken in opposition to the authorities, demonstrating for reform, writing books critical of the USSR were defined in some persons as being simultaneously a criminal act (e.g. violation of Articles 70 or 190-1), a symptom (e.g. "delusion of reformism"), and a diagnosis (e.g. "sluggish schizophrenia").

== 1950s–1960s ==
In the 1950s, Soviet dissidents started leaking criticism to the West by sending documents and statements to foreign diplomatic missions in Moscow. In the 1960s, Soviet dissidents frequently declared that the rights the government of the Soviet Union denied them were universal rights, possessed by everyone regardless of race, religion and nationality. In August 1969, for instance, the Initiating Group for Defense of Civil Rights in the USSR appealed to the United Nations Committee on Human Rights to defend the human rights being trampled on by Soviet authorities in a number of trials.

Some of the major milestones of the dissident movement of the 1960s included:

- Public readings of poetry at the Mayakovsky Square in downtown Moscow, where some of the underground writings critical of the system were often circulated; some of these public readings were dispersed by the police;
- The trial of poet Iosif Brodsky (later known as Joseph Brodsky, the future winner of the Nobel Prize in Literature) who was charged with 'parasitism' for not being officially employed and sentenced in 1963 to internal exile; he gained widespread sympathy and support in dissident and semi-dissident circles, mostly through the notes from his trial compiled by Frida Vigdorova
- The trial and sentencing of writers Andrei Sinyavsky and Yuli Daniel who were arrested in 1965 for publishing their co-authored work abroad under pennames and sentenced to labor camp and internal exile; opposition to this trial led to a campaign of petitions for their release that was signed by thousands of people, many of whom went on to participate more actively in the dissident movement
- Silent demonstrations on Moscow's Pushkin Square initiated by Alexander Yesenin-Volpin on the Soviet Constitution Day of Dec. 5, 1965, with posters urging the authorities to observe their own Constitution
- Petitioning campaigns against the downplaying of Stalin's terror after the removal of Nikita Khrushchev and the resurgence of the cult of Stalin's personality in parts of the Soviet government bureaucracy
- The launch, in April 1968, of the underground periodical, 'Chronicle of Current Events', documenting violations of human rights and protest activities across the Soviet Union
- The publication in the West of Andrei Sakharov's first political essay 'Reflections on Progress and Intellectual Freedom' in the spring and summer of 1968
- The rally of protest against the Soviet invasion of Czechoslovakia to suppress 'the Prague Spring'; was held on August 25, 1968, on Moscow's Red Square by eight dissidents including Viktor Fainberg, Natalya Gorbanevskaya, Pavel Litvinov, Vladimir Dremlyuga, and others
- The founding of the Initiative on Human Rights in 1969

== 1970s ==
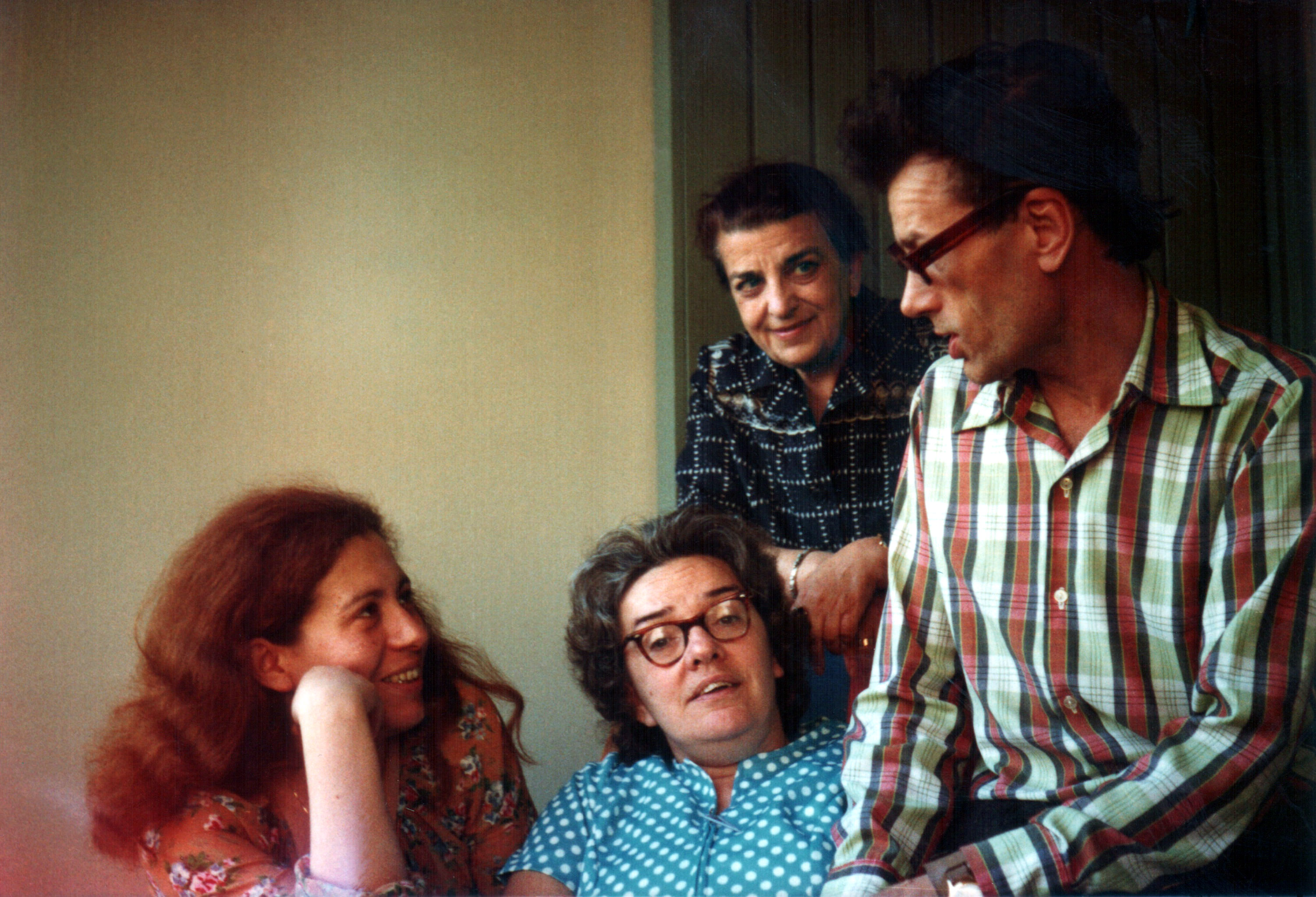
Moscow Helsinki Group members Yuliya Vishnevskya, Lyudmila Alexeyeva, Dina Kaminskaya, Kronid Lyubarsky in Munich, 1978

Our history shows that most of the people can be fooled for a very long time. But now all this idiocy is coming into clear contradiction with the fact that we have some level of openness. (Vladimir Voinovich)

The heyday of the dissenters as a presence in the Western public life was the 1970s. The Helsinki Accords inspired dissidents in the Soviet Union, Czechoslovakia, Hungary, and Poland to openly protest human rights failures by their own governments. The Soviet dissidents demanded that the Soviet authorities implement their own commitments proceeding from the Helsinki Agreement with the same zeal and in the same way as formerly the outspoken legalists expected the Soviet authorities to adhere strictly to the letter of their constitution. Dissident Russian and East European intellectuals who urged compliance with the Helsinki accords have been subjected to official repression. According to Soviet dissident Leonid Plyushch, Moscow has taken advantage of the Helsinki security pact to improve its economy while increasing the suppression of political dissenters. 50 members of Soviet Helsinki Groups were imprisoned. Cases of political prisoners and prisoners of conscience in the Soviet Union were divulged by Amnesty International in 1975 and by The Committee for the Defense of Soviet Political Prisoners in 1975 and 1976.

US President Jimmy Carter in his inaugural address on 20 January 1977 announced that human rights would be central to foreign policy during his administration. In February, Carter sent Andrei Dmitrievich Sakharov a letter expressing his support for the latter's stance on human rights. In the wake of Carter's letter to Sakharov, the USSR cautioned against attempts "to interfere' in its affairs under "a thought-up pretext of 'defending human rights.'" Because of Carter's open show of support for Soviet dissidents, the KGB was able to link dissent with American imperialism through suggesting that such protest is a cover for American espionage in the Soviet Union. The KGB head Yuri Andropov determined, "The need has thus emerged to terminate the actions of Orlov, fellow Helsinki monitor Ginzburg and others once and for all, on the basis of existing law." According to Dmitri Volkogonov and Harold Shukman, it was Andropov who approved the numerous trials of human rights activists such as Andrei Amalrik, Vladimir Bukovsky, Vyacheslav Chornovil, Zviad Gamsakhurdia, Alexander Ginzburg, Natalya Gorbanevskaya, Pyotr Grigorenko, Anatoly Shcharansky, and others:

If we accept human rights violations as just "their way" of doing things, then we are all guilty. (Andrei Sakharov)

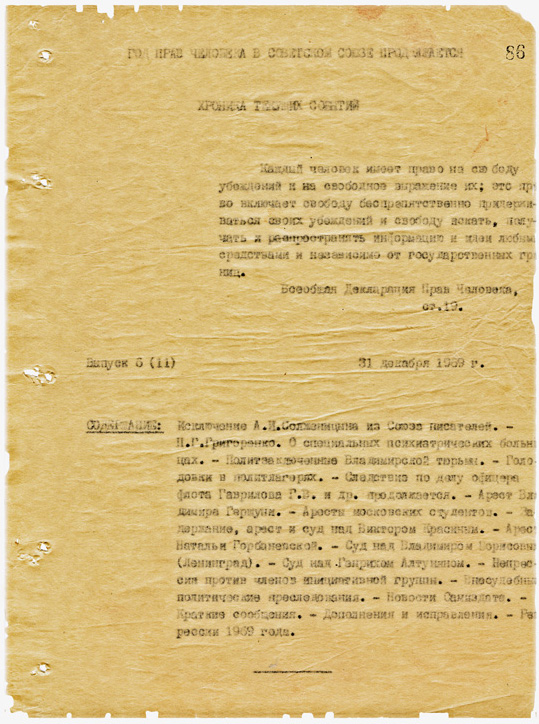
A Chronicle of Current Events No 11, 31 December 1968 (front cover)

Voluntary and involuntary emigration allowed the authorities to rid themselves of many political active intellectuals including writers Valentin Turchin, Georgi Vladimov, Vladimir Voinovich, Lev Kopelev, Vladimir Maximov, Naum Korzhavin, Vasily Aksyonov, psychiatrist Marina Voikhanskaya and others. A Chronicle of Current Events covered 424 political trials, in which 753 people were convicted, and no one of the accused was acquitted; in addition, 164 people were declared insane and sent to compulsory treatment in a psychiatric hospital.

According to Soviet dissidents and Western critics, the KGB had routinely sent dissenters to psychiatrists for diagnosing to avoid embarrassing public trials and to discredit dissidence as the product of ill minds. On the grounds that political dissenters in the Soviet Union were psychotic and deluded, they were locked away in psychiatric hospitals and treated with neuroleptics. Confinement of political dissenters in psychiatric institutions had become a common practice. That technique could be called the "medicalization" of dissidence or psychiatric terror, the now familiar form of repression applied in the Soviet Union to Leonid Plyushch, Pyotr Grigorenko, and many others. Finally, many persons at that time tended to believe that dissidents were abnormal people whose commitment to mental hospitals was quite justified. In the opinion of the Moscow Helsinki Group chairwoman Lyudmila Alexeyeva, the attribution of a mental illness to a prominent figure who came out with a political declaration or action is the most significant factor in the assessment of psychiatry during the 1960–1980s. At that time Soviet dissident Vladimir Bukovsky wrote A New Mental Illness in the USSR: The Opposition published in French, German, Italian, Spanish and (coauthored with Semyon Gluzman) A Manual on Psychiatry for Dissidents published in Russian, English, French, Italian, German, Danish.

=== Repression of the Helsinki Watch Groups ===
In 1977–1979 and again in 1980–1982, the KGB reacted to the Helsinki Watch Groups in Moscow, Kiev, Vilnius, Tbilisi, and Erevan by launching large-scale arrests and sentencing its members to in prison, labor camp, internal exile and psychiatric imprisonment.

From the members of the Moscow Helsinki Group, 1978 saw its members Yuri Orlov, Vladimir Slepak and Anatoly Shcharansky sentenced to lengthy labor camp terms and internal exile for "anti-Soviet agitation and propaganda" and treason. Another wave of arrests followed in the early 1980s: Malva Landa, Viktor Nekipelov, Leonard Ternovsky, Feliks Serebrov, Tatiana Osipova, Anatoly Marchenko, and Ivan Kovalev. Soviet authorities offered some activists the "opportunity" to emigrate. Lyudmila Alexeyeva emigrated in 1977. The Moscow Helsinki Group founding members Mikhail Bernshtam, Alexander Korchak, Vitaly Rubin also emigrated, and Pyotr Grigorenko was stripped of his Soviet citizenship while seeking medical treatment abroad.

The Ukrainian Helsinki Group suffered severe repressions throughout 1977–1982, with at times multiple labor camp sentences handed out to Mykola Rudenko, Oleksy Tykhy, Myroslav Marynovych, Mykola Matusevych, Levko Lukyanenko, Oles Berdnyk, Mykola Horbal, Zinovy Krasivsky, Vitaly Kalynychenko, Vyacheslav Chornovil, Olha Heyko, Vasyl Stus, Oksana Meshko, Ivan Sokulsky, Ivan Kandyba, Petro Rozumny, Vasyl Striltsiv, Yaroslav Lesiv, Vasyl Sichko, Yuri Lytvyn, Petro Sichko. By 1983 the Ukrainian Helsinki Group had 37 members, of whom 22 were in prison camps, 5 were in exile, 6 emigrated to the West, 3 were released and were living in Ukraine, 1 (Mykhailo Melnyk) committed suicide.

The Lithuanian Helsinki Group saw its members subjected to two waves of imprisonment for anti-Soviet activities and "organization of religious processions": Viktoras Petkus was sentenced in 1978; others followed in 1980–1981: Algirdas Statkevičius, Vytautas Skuodys, Mečislovas Jurevičius, and Vytautas Vaičiūnas.

== Currents of dissidence ==
=== Civil and human rights movement ===
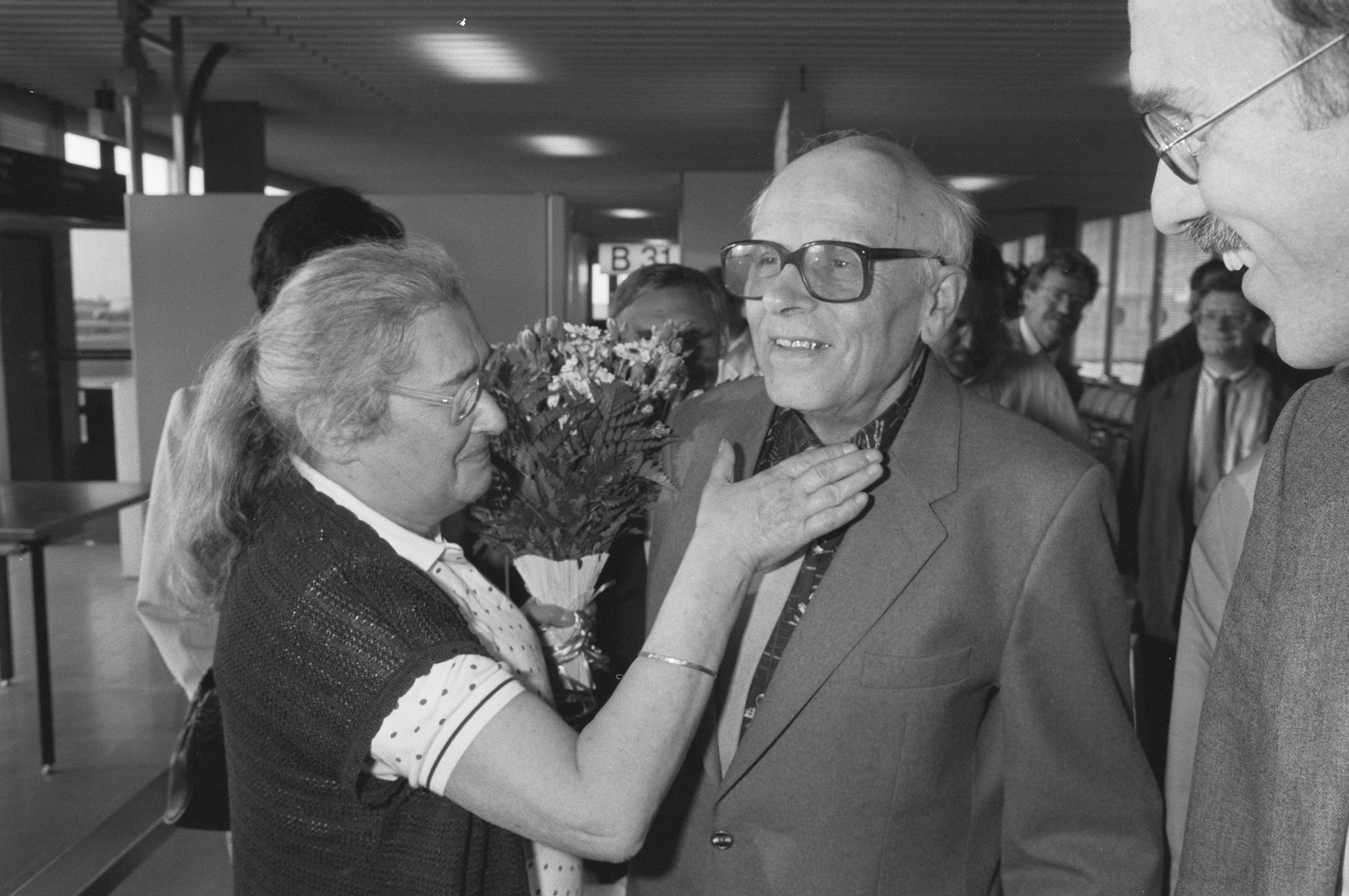
Yelena Bonner and Andrei Sakharov after their arrival for the conferment of the honorary doctorate in law from the University of Groningen, 15 June 1989

Starting in the 1960s, the early years of the Brezhnev stagnation, dissidents in the Soviet Union increasingly turned their attention towards civil and eventually human rights concerns. The fight for civil and human rights focused on issues of freedom of expression, freedom of conscience, freedom to emigrate, punitive psychiatry, and the plight of political prisoners. It was characterized by a new openness of dissent, a concern for legality, the rejection of any 'underground' and violent struggle.

Throughout the 1960s-1980s, those active in the civil and human rights movement engaged in a variety of activities: The documentation of political repression and rights violations in samizdat (unsanctioned press); individual and collective protest letters and petitions; unsanctioned demonstrations; mutual aid for prisoners of conscience; and, most prominently, civic watch groups appealing to the international community. Repercussions for these activities ranged from dismissal from work and studies to many years of imprisonment in labor camps and being subjected to punitive psychiatry.

Dissidents active in the movement in the 1960s introduced a "legalist" approach of avoiding moral and political commentary in favor of close attention to legal and procedural issues. Following several landmark political trials, coverage of arrests and trials in samizdat became more common. This activity eventually led to the founding of the Chronicle of Current Events in April 1968. The unofficial newsletter reported violations of civil rights and judicial procedure by the Soviet government and responses to those violations by citizens across the USSR.

During the late 1960s and throughout the 1970s, the rights-based strategy of dissent incorporated human rights ideas and rhetoric. The movement included figures such as Valery Chalidze, Yuri Orlov, and Lyudmila Alexeyeva. Special groups were founded such as the Initiative Group for the Defense of Human Rights in the USSR (1969) and the Committee on Human Rights in the USSR (1970). The signing of the Helsinki Accords (1975) containing human rights clauses provided rights campaigners with a new hope to use international instruments. This led to the creation of dedicated Helsinki Watch Groups in Moscow (Moscow Helsinki Group), Kiev (Ukrainian Helsinki Group), Vilnius (Lithuanian Helsinki Group), Tbilisi, and Erevan (1976–77).

The civil and human rights initiatives played a significant role in providing a common language for Soviet dissidents with varying concerns, and became a common cause for social groups in the dissident milieu ranging from activists in the youth subculture to academics such as Andrei Sakharov. Due to the contacts with Western journalists as well as the political focus during détente (Helsinki Accords), those active in the human rights movement were among those most visible in the West (next to refuseniks).

=== Movements of deported nations ===
In 1944 THE WHOLE OF OUR PEOPLE was slanderously accused of betraying the Soviet Motherland and was forcibly deported from the Crimea. [...] [O]n 5 September 1967, there appeared a Decree of the Presidium of the USSR Supreme Soviet which cleared us of the charge of treason but described us not as Crimean Tatars but as "citizens of Tatar nationality formerly resident in the Crimea", thus legitimizing our banishment from our home country and liquidating us as a nation.

We did not grasp the significance of the decree immediately. After it was published, several thousand people traveled to the Crimea but were once again forcibly expelled. The protest which our people sent to the party Central Committee was left unanswered, as were also the protests of representatives of the Soviet public who supported us. The authorities replied to us only with persecution and court cases.

Since 1959 more than two hundred of the most active and courageous representatives have been sentenced to terms of up to seven years although they had always acted within the limits of the Soviet Constitution.

— Appeal by Crimean Tatars to World Public Opinion, Chronicle of Current Events Issue No 2 (30 June 1968)

Several national or ethnic groups who had been deported under Stalin formed movements to return to their homelands. In particular, the Crimean Tatars aimed to return to Crimea, the Meskhetian Turks to South Georgia and ethnic Germans aimed to resettle along the Volga River near Saratov.

The Crimean Tatar movement takes a prominent place among the movement of deported nations. The Tatars had been refused the right to return to the Crimea, even though the laws justifying their deportation had been overturned. Their first collective letter calling for the restoration dates to 1957. In the early 1960s, the Crimean Tatars had begun to establish initiative groups in the places where they had been forcibly resettled. Led by Mustafa Dzhemilev, they founded their own democratic and decentralized organization, considered unique in the history of independent movements in the Soviet Union.

=== Emigration movements ===
The emigration movements in the Soviet Union included the movement of Soviet Jews to emigrate to Israel and of the Volga Germans to emigrate to West Germany.

Soviet Jews were routinely denied permission to emigrate by the authorities of the former Soviet Union and other countries of the Eastern bloc. A movement for the right to emigrate formed in the 1960s, which also gave rise to a revival of interest in Jewish culture. The refusenik cause gathered considerable attention in the West.

Citizens of German origin who lived in the Baltic states prior to their annexation in 1940 and descendants of the eighteenth-century Volga German settlers also formed a movement to leave the Soviet Union. In 1972, the West German government entered an agreement with the Soviet authorities which permitted between 6,000 and 8,000 people to emigrate to West Germany every year for the rest of the decade. As a result, almost 70,000 ethnic Germans had left the Soviet Union by the mid-1980s.

Similarly, Armenians achieved a small emigration. By the mid-1980s, over 15,000 Armenians had emigrated.

=== Religious movements ===
The religious movements in the USSR included Russian Orthodox, Catholic, and Protestant movements. They focused on the freedom to practice their faith and resistance to interference by the state in their internal affairs.

The Russian Orthodox movement remained relatively small. The Catholic movement in Lithuania was part of the larger Lithuanian national movement. Protestant groups which opposed the anti-religious state directives included the Baptists, the Seventh-day Adventists, and the Pentecostals. Similar to the Jewish and German dissident movements, many in the independent Pentecostal movement pursued emigration.

=== National movements ===
The national movements included the Russian national dissidents as well as dissident movements from Ukraine, Lithuania, Latvia, Estonia, Georgia, and Armenia.

Among the nations that lived in their own territories with the status of republics within the Soviet Union, the first movement to emerge in the 1960s was the Ukrainian movement. Its aspiration was to resist the Russification of Ukraine and to insist on equal rights and democratization for the republic.

In Lithuania, the national movement of the 1970s was closely linked to the Catholic movement.

=== Literary and cultural ===
Several landmark examples of dissenting writers played a significant role for the wider dissident movement. These include the persecutions of Osip Mandelshtam, Boris Pasternak, Mikhail Bulgakov, and Joseph Brodsky, as well as the publication of The Gulag Archipelago by Aleksandr Solzhenitsyn.

In literary world, there were dozens of literati who participated in dissident movement, including Vasily Aksyonov, Yury Aikhenvald, Arkadiy Belinkov, Leonid Borodin, Joseph Brodsky, Yuli Daniel, David Dar, Aleksandr Galich, Anatoly Gladilin, Yuliy Kim, Lev Kopelev, Naum Korzhavin, Konstantin Kuzminsky, Vladimir Maksimov, Viktor Nekrasov, Varlam Shalamov, Andrei Sinyavsky, Aleksandr Solzhenitsyn, Kari Unksova, Georgi Vladimov, Vladimir Voinovich, Venedikt Yerofeyev, and Alexander Zinoviev.

In the early Soviet Union, non-conforming academics were exiled via so-called Philosophers' ships. Later, figures such as cultural theorist Grigori Pomerants were among active dissidents.

Other intersections of cultural and literary nonconformism with dissidents include the underground poetry and the wide field of Soviet Nonconformist Art, such as the painters of the underground Lianozovo group, and artists active in the "Second Culture".

=== Other groups ===
Other groups included the Socialists, the movements for socioeconomic rights (especially the independent unions), as well as women's, environmental, and peace movements.

== Dissidents and the Cold War ==
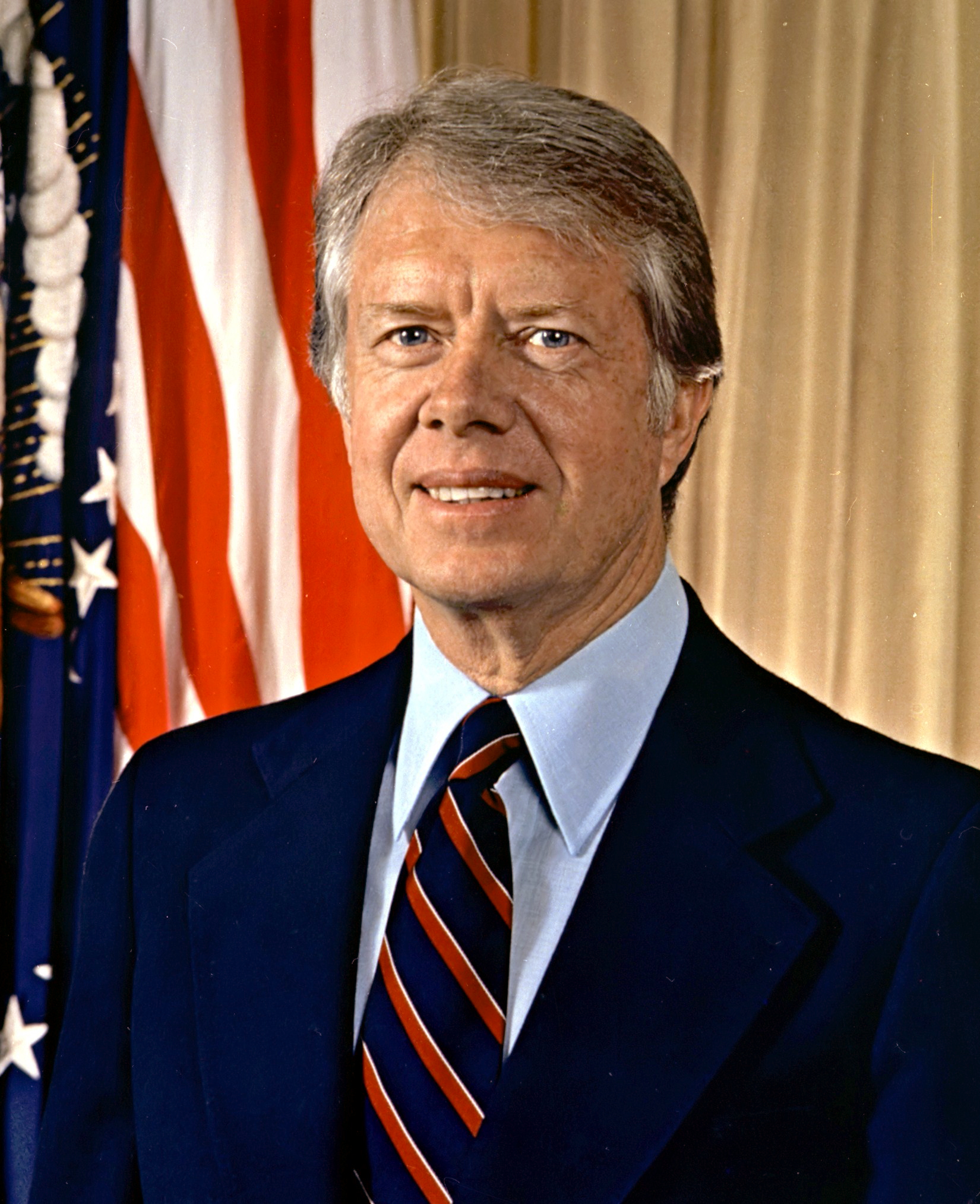
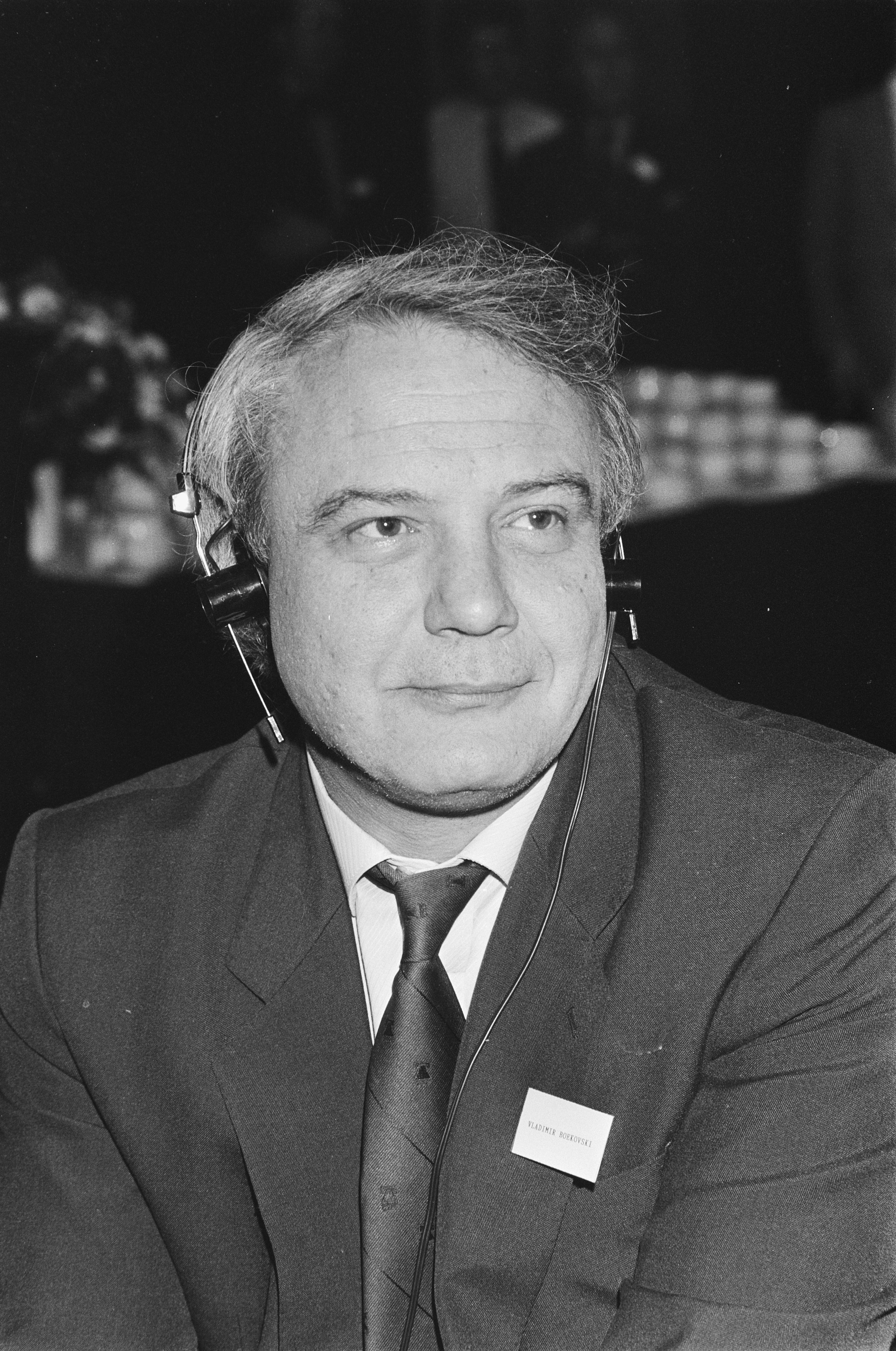
In 1977, Jimmy Carter received prominent dissident Vladimir Bukovsky at the White House.

Responding to the issue of refuseniks in the Soviet Union, the United States Congress passed the Jackson–Vanik amendment in 1974. The provision in United States federal law intended to affect U.S. trade relations with countries of the Communist bloc that restrict freedom of emigration and other human rights.

The eight member countries of the Warsaw Pact signed the Helsinki Final Act in August 1975. The "third basket" of the Act included extensive human rights clauses.

When Jimmy Carter entered office in 1976, he broadened his advisory circle to include critics of US–Soviet détente. He voiced support for the Czech dissident movement known as Charter 77, and publicly expressed concern about the Soviet treatment of dissidents Aleksandr Ginzburg and Andrei Sakharov. In 1977, Carter received prominent dissident Vladimir Bukovsky in the White House, asserting that he did not intend "to be timid" in his support of human rights.

In 1979, the US Helsinki Watch Committee was established, funded by the Ford Foundation. Founded after the example of the Moscow Helsinki Group and similar watch groups in the Soviet bloc, it also aimed to monitor compliance with the human rights provisions of the Helsinki Accords and to provide moral support for those struggling for that objective inside the Soviet bloc. It acted as a conduit for information on repression in the Soviet Union, and lobbied policy-makers in the United States to continue to press the issue with Soviet leaders.

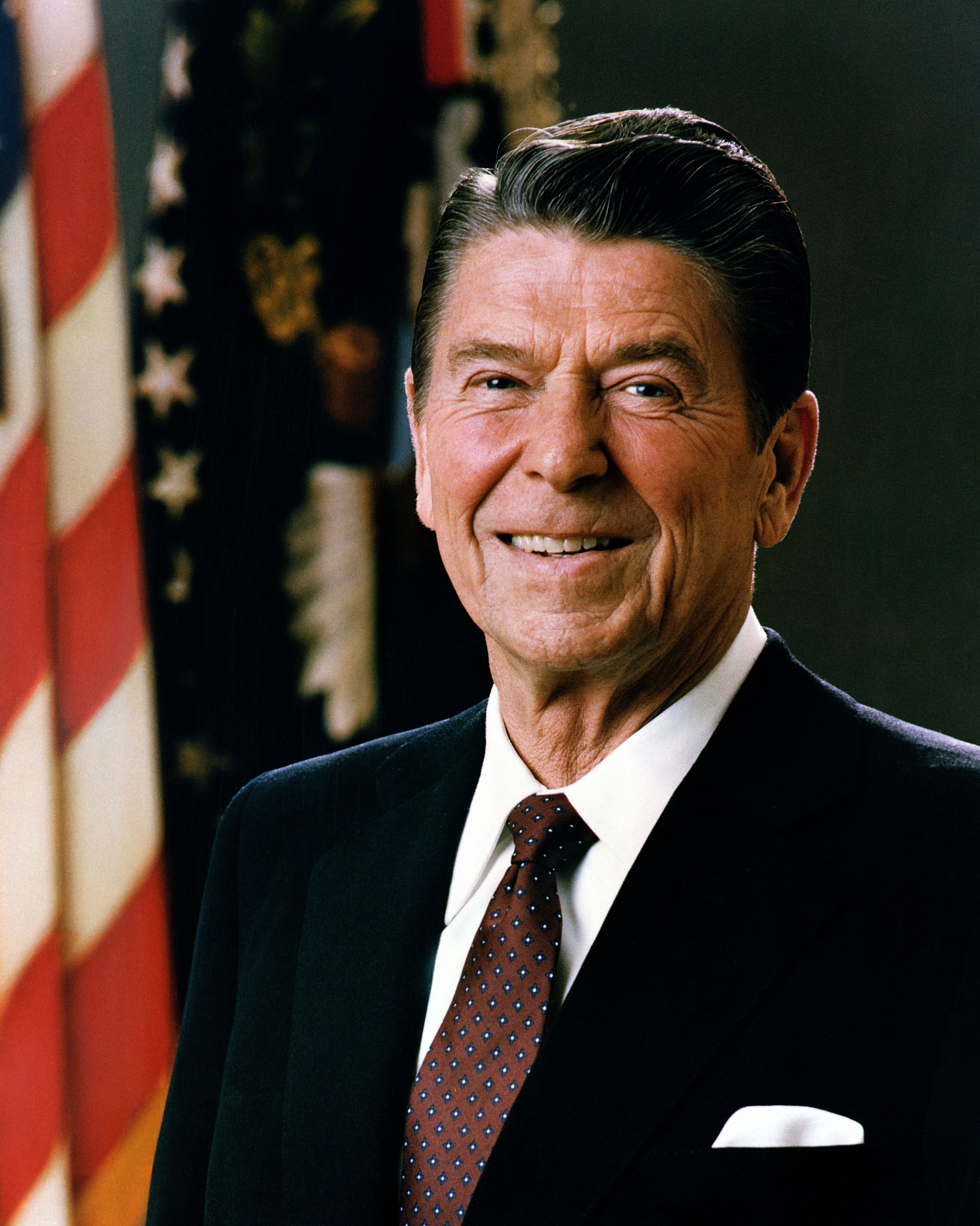
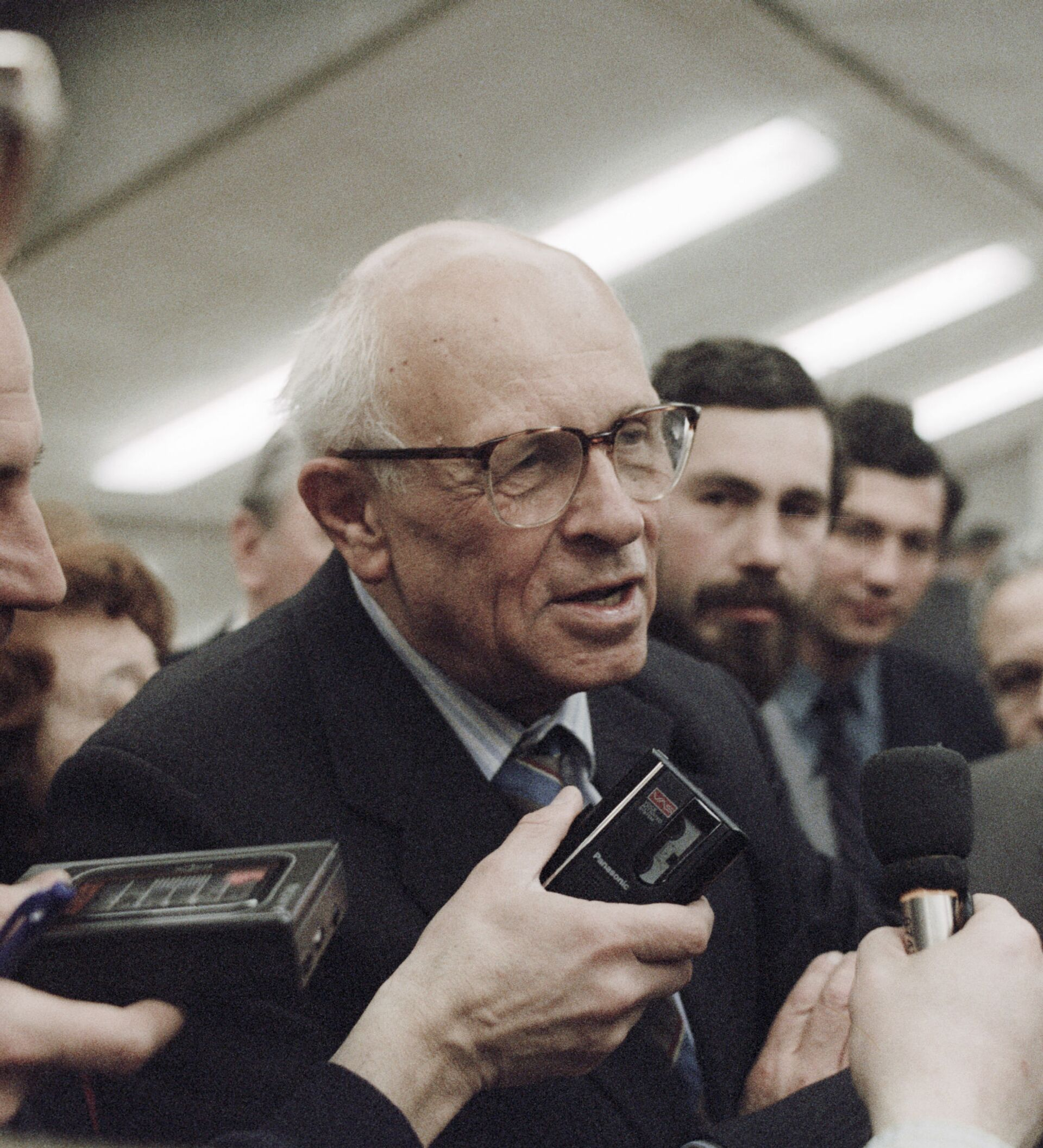
In 1988, Ronald Reagan held a meeting with Andrei Sakharov at the White House

US President Ronald Reagan attributed to the view that the "brutal treatment of Soviet dissidents was due to bureaucratic inertia." On 14 November 1988, he held a meeting with Andrei Sakharov at the White House and said that Soviet human rights abuses are impeding progress and would continue to do so until the problem is "completely eliminated." Whether talking to about one hundred dissidents in a broadcast to the Soviet people or at the U.S. Embassy, Reagan's agenda was one of freedom to travel, freedom of speech and freedom of religion.

== Dissidents about their dissent ==
Andrei Sakharov said, "Everyone wants to have a job, be married, have children, be happy, but dissidents must be prepared to see their lives destroyed and those dear to them hurt. When I look at my situation and my family's situation and that of my country, I realize that things are getting steadily worse." Lyudmila Alexeyeva, a fellow dissident and one of the founders of the Moscow Helsinki Group, wrote:

What would happen if citizens acted on the assumption that they have rights? If one person did it, he would become a martyr; if two people did it, they would be labeled an enemy organization; if thousands of people did it, the state would have to become less oppressive.

According to Soviet dissident Victor Davydoff, totalitarian systems lack mechanisms to change the behavior of the ruling group internally. Attempts from within are suppressed through repression, necessitating international human rights organizations and foreign governments to exert external pressure for change.

== See also ==
- A Chronicle of Current Events
- Anarchism in Russia
- Anti-Leninism
- Anti-Stalinist left
- Aleksandr Skobov
- Chronicle of the Catholic Church in Lithuania
- Dissident movement in the People's Republic of Poland
- Dubravlag
- Human rights movement in the Soviet Union
- Left communism
- Perm-36
- Parallels, Events, People (36 parts) – 2013 documentary by Natella Boltyanskaya
- Refusenik – 2007 documentary by Laura Bialis
- Samizdat
- They Chose Freedom (4 parts) – 2005 documentary by Vladimir Kara-Murza Jr.

== Audiovisual material ==
Collapsed list
- Альфавит инакомыслия [Alphabet of dissent]. Радио Свобода (in Russian). Radio Liberty.
- Natella Boltyanskaya (16 March 2016). "Episode One – Dissidents: Who are they?". Voice of America. Parallels, Events, People.
- Natella Boltyanskaya (16 March 2016). "Episode Two – Dissidents: What did they want?". Voice of America. Parallels, Events, People.
- Лошак, Андрей (3 September 2013). Анатомия процесса [The anatomy of a trial (video of the documentary)] (in Russian). TV Rain.
- Певзнер, Гелия (31 May 2016). Сергей Ковалев: "Голоса мудрецов — ничтожная доля процента" [Sergei Kovalev: Voices of sages is a tiny fraction of percent] (in Russian). Radio France Internationale.
- Подрабинек, Александр (31 May 2014). Военная экспансия и репрессии [Military expansion and repression]. Радио Свобода (in Russian). Radio Liberty.
- Vladimir V. Kara-Murza (22 August 2013). "They Chose Freedom: The Story of Soviet Dissidents (The documentary in English available to watch online)". Institute of Modern Russia. Archived from the original on 7 April 2016.
- The history of the MHG and human rights movement, in Russian, 53 min on YouTube
- Václav Havel and Soviet Dissidents, 8 min on YouTube
- "Nonconformism and Dissent in the Soviet Bloc: Guiding Legacy or Passing Memory?". Harriman Institute, Columbia University. 1 April 2011. Archived from the original on 16 February 2017.
  - Day 1, Panel 1, 84 min on YouTube
  - Day 2, Panel 1, 134 min on YouTube
  - Day 2, Panel 2, 119 min on YouTube
  - Day 2, Panel 3, 112 min on YouTube
  - Day 3, Panel 1, 83 min on YouTube
  - Day 3, Panel 2, 106 min on YouTube
  - Day 3, Panel 3, 107 min on YouTube
