= Henri Reznik =

Russian lawyer

- Генри Резник
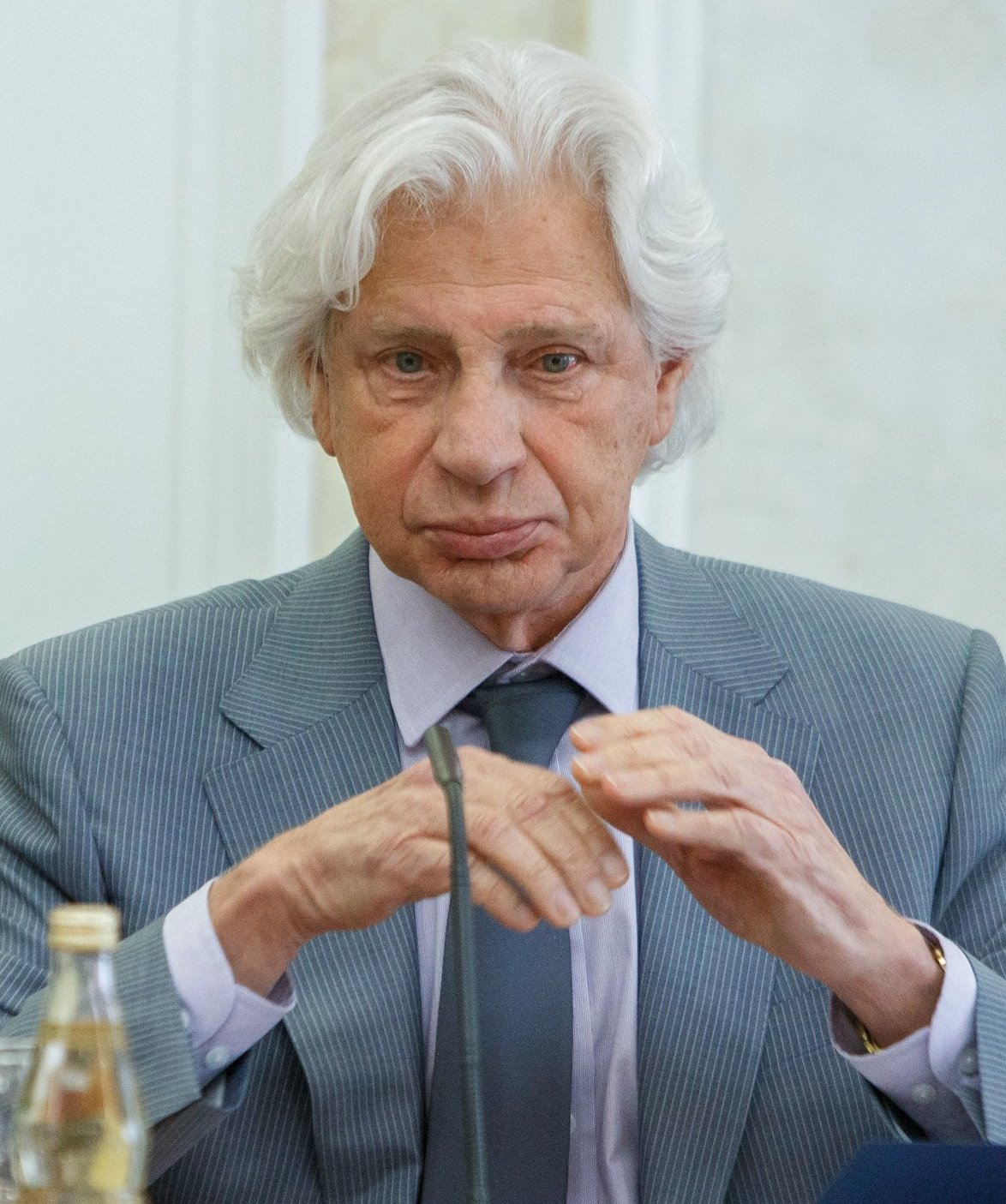
- Reznik in 2014
- Born: Henri Markovich Reznik; May 11, 1938 (age 88); Leningrad, Russian SFSR, Soviet Union (now Saint Petersburg, Russia)
- Citizenship: Russia
- Education: Kazakh State University (1962)
- Occupation: Lawyer
- Years active: 1985–present
- Spouse: Larisa Lvova
- Children: 1

Henri Markovich Reznik, also Genri Reznik (Russian: Генри Маркович Резник; born 11 May 1938) is a prominent Russian lawyer (advocate), former criminal investigator and criminologist. He chaired the presidium of the Moscow City Bar Association from 2002 to 2015.

Henri Reznik's voice
recorded October 2012

Reznik was teaching Kutafin Moscow State Law University since 2009. He left in 2017 after the University installed a plaque memorializing Stalin.
