= Larisa Bogoraz =

Soviet dissident

- Лариса Богораз
- Born: Larisa Iosifovna Bogoraz-Brukhman; August 8, 1929; Kharkiv, Ukrainian SSR, Soviet Union (now Ukraine)
- Died: April 6, 2004 (aged 74); Moscow, Russian Federation
- Citizenship: Soviet Union (1926–1991); Russian Federation (1991–2004)
- Education: University of Kharkiv
- Occupation: linguist
- Known for: human rights activism with participation in the Moscow Helsinki Group and A Chronicle of Current Events
- Movement: dissident movement in the Soviet Union
- Spouses: Yuli Daniel, Anatoly Marchenko
- Children: Alexander Daniel

Larisa Iosifovna Bogoraz (Russian: Лари́са Ио́сифовна Богора́з(-Брухман), full name: Larisa Iosifovna Bogoraz-Brukhman, Bogoraz was her father's last name, Brukhman her mother's, August 8, 1929 – April 6, 2004) was a dissident in the Soviet Union.

== Biography ==
Born in Kharkiv, at the time capital of the Ukrainian SSR, to a family of Communist Party bureaucrats, she graduated as a linguist from the University of Kharkiv and in 1950, married her first husband, Yuli Daniel, a writer. Together, they moved to Moscow.

Her marriage to Daniel would ultimately lead to her becoming involved in activism. In 1965, Daniel and a friend of his, Andrei Sinyavsky, were arrested for a number of writings that they had had published overseas under pseudonyms (see Sinyavsky-Daniel trial). The trial of the two men was the beginning of a crackdown on dissent under General Secretary Leonid Brezhnev. They were both sent to terms in forced labor camps. After their detention, Bogoraz wrote to Brezhnev in protest, despite knowing that such an act could land her in prison.

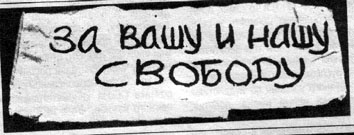
"For our freedom and yours", one of the protester's banners, 1968

In 1968, together with Pavel Litvinov, she prepared a letter addressed to the "world community" about the "Trial of the Four" (Yuri Galanskov, Alexander Ginzburg, Alexey Dobrovolsky, Vera Lashkova).

Bogoraz became well known when, on August 25, 1968, she organized seven people to protest in Red Square against the Soviet Union's invasion of Czechoslovakia at the 1968 Red Square demonstration, together with Pavel Litvinov, Natalya Gorbanevskaya, Vadim Delaunay and other protesters. As all participants, Bogoraz was arrested, tried and sentenced to four years of exile in Siberia, which she spent in a woodworking plant..

Daniel was released in 1970, while Bogoraz was still in Siberia. Their marriage did not survive much longer, and they soon divorced. However, soon after her release, Bogoraz resumed her resistance of the Soviet regime. She signed many public appeals to the authorities. She co-wrote an underground book, Memory, which detailed Stalin's terror and was subsequently published overseas. She also contributed to the underground publication A Chronicle of Current Events. In 1975, she wrote a letter to Yuri Andropov, who was the head of the KGB at the time, requesting that he open the organization's archives.

== Bogoraz and Marchenko ==
Bogoraz later married Anatoly Marchenko, another prominent dissident. Together, they co-wrote a number of appeals. Marchenko was arrested in 1980, and unlike Daniel, did not survive his sentence. Bogoraz launched a campaign in 1986 to have all political prisoners freed. The campaign was successful, as the following year, General Secretary Mikhail Gorbachev began releasing them. This came too late for Marchenko, who died as a result of a hunger strike shortly before the initial release.

In 1987, she tried to initiate a campaign for amnesty for political prisoners.

In 1989, Bogoraz joined, and subsequently became chairwoman of, the newly re-founded Moscow Helsinki Group. She acted as a bridge between the old guard of dissidents, and the new generation that were arising as the Soviet Union dissolved.

== Post-1991 ==
After the demise of the Soviet Union, Bogoraz continued her activism, visiting prisoners and holding seminars on the defense of human rights. She also became chairwoman of the Seminar on Human Rights, a joint Russian-American nongovernmental organization. She resigned from the latter in 1996, but continued to exert influence in human rights circles up until her death.

Not long before her death, she issued an open letter condemning both the 1999 NATO bombing of Yugoslavia and the 2003 Iraq War. She died in Moscow on April 6, 2004, aged 74, after a series of strokes.

== Other ==
Bogoraz is mentioned in the song Ilyich (in Russian) by Yuliy Kim, available at several sites. That song is about the reaction of Brezhnev to the demonstration, and catches the spirit of the epoch of Brezhnev stagnation, although at the time of writing of the song, the text of the letter of Andropov to Central Committee was not available.

== Articles ==
- Bogoraz, Larisa (April 2002). "Living the movies". Index on Censorship. 3 (2): 15–17. doi:10.1080/03064220208537038. S2CID 144849500.
