= Place of Skulls =

Place of Skulls may refer to:

- Golgotha
- Place of Skulls (Moscow), a circular stone platform in Red Square.
- Place of Skulls (band), a doom metal band from Knoxville, Tennessee.
