= Pavel Litvinov =

Former Soviet dissident

Pavel Mikhailovich Litvinov
- Павел Михайлович Литвинов
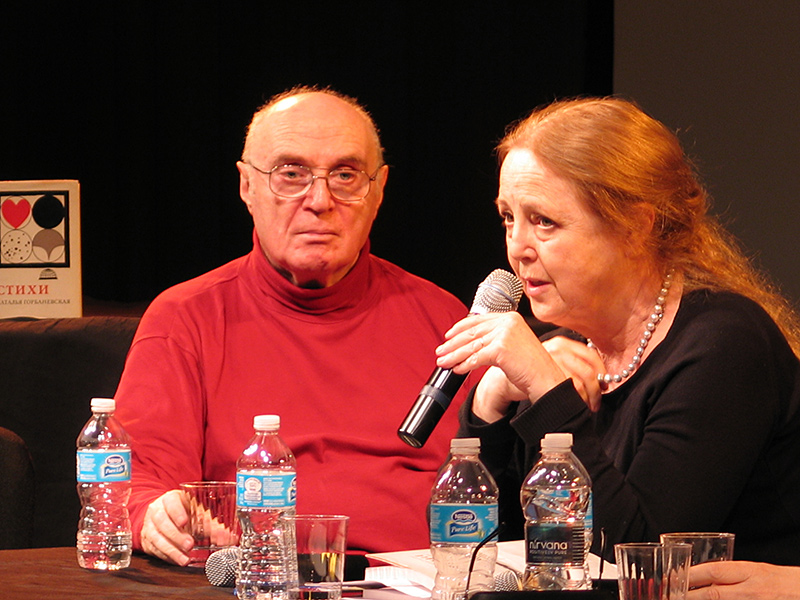
- Pavel Litvinov and Irena Grudzińska-Gross, reading for Natalya Gorbanevskaya, 2014
- Born: 6 July 1940 (age 86); Moscow, Soviet Union
- Education: Moscow State University
- Occupation: physicist
- Known for: Human rights activism and participation in the 1968 Red Square demonstration and dissident movement in the Soviet Union
- Children: Sergey, Joseph, Dimitri, and Lara Julia M. Santiago, spouse of Pavel Litvinov
- Relatives: Nina M. Litvinova (sister)
- Scientific career
- Fields: physics
- Workplaces: Moscow State University of Fine Chemical Technologies, Hackley School

Pavel Mikhailovich Litvinov (Russian: Па́вел Миха́йлович Литви́нов; born 6 July 1940) is a Russian-born U.S. physicist, writer, teacher, human rights activist and former Soviet-era dissident.

== Biography ==
The grandson of Ivy Low and Maxim Litvinov, Joseph Stalin's foreign minister during the 1930s, Pavel Litvinov was raised amongst the Soviet elite. As a schoolboy, he was devoted to the cult of Stalin, and was tapped, unsuccessfully, by the KGB to report on his parents Flora and Misha Litvinov (a story that is related by the journalist David Remnick in his book Lenin's Tomb).

After the death of Joseph Stalin in 1953 and the return of family friends from the labour camps, Pavel grew disillusioned with the Soviet system. He had a short-lived marriage when he was seventeen. In his twenties, he became a physics teacher at the Institute for Chemical Technology. It was while he was working at the Institute that he became acquainted with a group of intellectuals who were following the show-trials of the dissidents Andrei Sinyavsky and Yuli Daniel. His immersion in samizdat literature at this time brought him into contact with the works of Aleksandr Solzhenitsyn, Varlam Shalamov and Robert Conquest.

He participated in petition campaigns in the USSR and compiled the samizdat collections "Justice or Punishment" (1967) and "The Trial of the Four" (1968, about the trial of Alexander Ginzburg, Yuri Galanskov, Alexey Dobrovolsky, and Vera Lashkova). When Ginzburg and Galanskov were tried for publishing samizdat in 1967, Pavel Litvinov and Larisa Bogoraz released their famous "Appeal to World Community"; the first open appeal of Soviet dissidents to the West, it appealed to the international public to protest against the closed trial. The replies that he received from Soviet citizens were smuggled abroad and published in book form in 1969. Most were sympathetic, though the collection also included hate mail that attacked Litvinov for being a Jew and for his supposed lack of patriotism. Litvinov's exchange of correspondence with Stephen Spender inspired the formation of the Writers and Scholars Educational Trust and its journal Index on Censorship.

Over the following years, Litvinov became active in the dissident civil rights movement and was an editor of its regular samizdat bulletin Chronicle of Current Events. The periodical, founded in 1968, documented searches, arrests, and court proceedings in Russia and other Soviet states. During 1967, he compiled a book on the trial of Vladimir Bukovsky and three others. Summoned to the headquarters of the KGB in October 1967, he was threatened with arrest if the book was published, but he ignored the threat and arranged for it to be published abroad as The Demonstration in Pushkin Square. He compiled a similar book about the Trial of the Four.

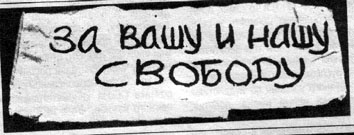
The historical banner of the Red Square demonstrators, For your freedom and ours.

On 25 August 1968, Litvinov was one of the participants in the 1968 Red Square demonstration against the Warsaw Pact invasion of Czechoslovakia that had taken place four days earlier. Among the others were Larisa Bogoraz, a philologist, the poets Natalya Gorbanevskaya and Vadim Delaunay, Viktor Fainberg, an art critic, and Vladimir Dremlyuga, a history student. They raised banners in Czech and Russian expressing support for Czechoslovak independence and solidarity with Alexander Dubček, the Czechoslovak leader who was the architect of the Prague Spring. The KGB arrested the protesters and beat them; they were tried in secret that October. Litvinov was sentenced to five years' exile in Chita, Zabaykalsky Krai, Siberia.

In 1974, after his return from exile, Litvinov and his wife Maya left the Soviet Union and travelled to Vienna by train. From there, they relocated to Rome before moving to the United States. In New York, Litvinov joined fellow émigré dissident Valery Chalidze in publishing A Chronicle of Human Rights in the USSR, which documented political repression.

Litvinov currently lives in the United States, where he taught physics and mathematics at the Hackley School in Tarrytown, New York from 1976 until his retirement in 2006.

== Other ==
Pavel Litvinov is a son-in-law of the dissident and literary scholar Lev Kopelev. His son Dima Litvinov is an environmental activist with Greenpeace. In 2013, he was arrested as part of the Greenpeace Arctic Sunrise ship case.

Pavel Litvinov is a member of the board of the Andrey Sakharov Foundation.

In 2005 Pavel Litvinov participated in "They Chose Freedom", a four-part television documentary on the history of the Soviet dissident movement.

His sister Nina Mikhailovna Litvinova, born 1945 and a zoologist and marine biologist, killed herself in protest against Putin in May 2026.

== See also ==
- 1968 Red Square demonstration

== Bibliography ==
- Litvinov, Pavel (1969). Dear Comrade: Pavel Litvinov and the voices of Soviet citizens in dissent. Pitman Publishing Corporation. ASIN B000O05GKK.
- Litvinov, Pavel (1969). The Demonstration in Pushkin Square. Harvill Press. ISBN 978-0002721516.
- Litvinov, Pavel (November 1969). "Deux accusés parlent" [Two defendants speak]. Esprit (in French). 386 (11): 635–639. JSTOR 24261416.
- Litvinov, Pavel (1972). The Trial of the Four. A Collection of Materials on the Case of Galanskov, Ginzburg, Dobrovolsky, and Lashkova. New York: Viking Press. ASIN B002MRXGRI.
- Litvinov, Pavel (March 1975). "The human rights movement in the USSR". Index on Censorship. 4 (1): 11–15. doi:10.1080/03064227508532389. S2CID 146906418.
- Baraheni, Reza; Litvinov, Pavel; Sostre, Martin (15 July 1976). "Free Mustafa Dzhemilev". The New York Review of Books. 23 (12).
- Litvinov, Pavel (Winter 1980). "Momentary enthusiasms don't help – only persistence will secure human rights gains". Jurimetrics. 21 (2): 135–142. JSTOR 29761738.
- Alexeyeva, Lyudmila; Grigorenko, Pyotr; Amalrik, Andrei; Kaminskaya, Dina; Simes, Konstantin; Williams, Nikolai; Litvinov, Pavel; Litvinova, Maya; Sadomskaya, Natalya; Chalidze, Valery; Shragin, Boris; Stain, Yuri (2013) [1978]. "В защиту Анатолия Марченко" [In defense of Anatoly Marchenko]. Kontinent (in Russian). 152.
- Aksenov, Vasily; Etkind, Efim; Grigorenko, Pyotr; Grigorenko, Zinaida; Kopelev, Lev; Litvinov, Pavel; Litvinov, Maya; Mihajlov, Mihajlo; Proffer, Carl; Proffer, Ellendea; Synyavsky, Andrey; Shraginet, Boris; et al. (4 February 1982). "Help the Poles". The New York Review of Books. 29 (1).
- Phillips, William; Shragin, Boris; Aleshkovsky, Yuz; Kott, Jan; Siniavski, Andrei; Aksyonov, Vassily; Litvinov, Pavel; Dovlatov, Sergei; Nekrassov, Viktor; Etkind, Efim; Voinovich, Vladimir; Kohak, Erazim; Loebl, Eugen (Winter 1984). "Writers in exile III: a conference of Soviet and East European dissidents". The Partisan Review. 51 (1): 11–44.
- Litvinov, Pavel (January 1992). "Waiting for the new dictators". Index on Censorship. 21 (1): 2–4. doi:10.1080/03064229208535244. S2CID 143559586.
- Litvinov, Pavel (18 June 2005). "No American 'Gulag'". The Washington Post.
- Litvinov, Pavel (25 October 2013). "Facing Russian prison for a peaceful protest". The Washington Post.
