= 2008 Red Square demonstration =

Photo of the 2008 Red Square demonstration

Photo of 2008 red Square demonstration

The 2008 Red Square demonstration was a political demonstration that took place on August 24, 2008, at the Lobnoe Mesto in Moscow, Russia, in reference to the 1968 Red Square demonstration. The demonstration involved seven protesters unfurling a banner with the slogan For Your Freedom And Ours (Russian: За вашу и нашу свободу), before police arrived at the scene several minutes later. The police officers detained several protesters and spectators, and tried to destroy all record of the event.

== Historic context ==
The demonstration was a reference to the 1968 Red Square demonstration, in which seven Russians protested against the Soviet occupation of Czechoslovakia (see Warsaw Pact invasion of Czechoslovakia). The 2008 demonstration was organized to express the sentiment that the Russian Federation had reverted to such Soviet customs, an impression fueled by the inconsistency of official notices published in the media during the Russo-Georgian War.

== Events and aftermath ==
At noon on 24 August 2008, the protesters unfurled a banner reading For Our Freedom And Yours, and began to shout that slogan. After several minutes, they started explaining their views to spectators, distributing notices, and answering questions. The basic views of the protesters included the following:

- Political imprisonment has restarted in Russia
- Elections have not been prudent
- Love for country has been substituted with love for its leaders
- The freedom that was created in 1968 is being suppressed today; it is still dangerous to express one's own opinion, and even bloggers are prosecuted.

One police officer subsequently approached the protesters and requested that they leave the area. The protesters complied and began walking along the Red square along with the officer; other officers subsequently joined the group. The protesters handed the banner to the police officers and left the Red Square; only three of them, Dmitroshkin, Zboroshenko and Ninenko, were detained, along with several spectators who took pictures and recorded videos of the event. These pictures and videos were destroyed, and one camera was reported to have been broken by the police. Four journalists were amongst the detained spectators, namely

- Elena Kostyuchenko (Елена Костюченко), from newspaper Novaya Gazeta («Новая газета»);
- Ivan Rusayev (Иван Русаев), from newspaper Vedomosti («Ведомости»);
- Dmitriy Borko (Дмитрий Борко), from Grani-TV («Грани-ТВ»); and
- Dmitriy Shibayev (Дмитрий Шибаев), from newspaper New Times («Нъю Таймс»).

The detained individuals were sent to the Kitai-gorod police department, where the police officer major Selishev (Селищев) dealt with them. At 12:20pm, all the journalists were released except Kostuchenko, who insisted that the police officers state officially that they had broken her camera. The actions of detained persons were classified as "violation of rules of public events" (article 20.2 of the Offences Code of Russia, "not following the rules of proceedings of a public protest").

== Video ==
- http://grani-tv.ru/entries/443/ (Грани-ТВ), in Russian
- https://web.archive.org/web/20080922203915/http://piter.indymedia.ru/node/5195, in Russian

== Russian version ==
- wikinews:ru:Демонстрация 24 августа 2008 года
