= Nikolai Borisovich Delone =

Soviet physicist

Nikolai Delaunay, Jr. (aka Delone, Nikolai Borisovich; 22 May 1926 – 11 September 2008) was a Soviet physicist born in Leningrad, USSR (now Saint Petersburg, Russia).

== Life ==
Delaunay was born in Leningrad on 22 May 1926. He was the son of Boris Delaunay, a mathematician known for creating the Delaunay triangulation. He graduated from the Moscow Engineering Physics Institute in 1951, and obtained his PhD at the Lebedev Physical Institute in the late 1950s.

Delaunay is recognized for the first observations of multiphoton ionization, in 1965. Delaunay, along with Maxim Ammosov and Vladimir P. Krainov, developed the ADK formula, relating tunneling ionization in laser fields. He was also a lecturer at the Moscow Institute of Physics and Technology. After the dissolution of the Soviet Union, he travelled abroad and worked on international collaborations on multiphoton physics.

His son was Vadim Delaunay, a poet and dissident, who participated in the 1968 Red Square demonstration of protest against military suppression of the Prague Spring.

== Publications ==
Delone published over 200 scientific papers, a four-book series on the physics of strong laser fields and on multiphoton physics, and a series of high-school level Russian textbooks.
