= Vadim Delaunay =

Russian poet and dissident (1947–1983)

Vadim Delaunay Вадим Николаевич Делоне
- Vadim Delaunay, 1967
- Born: Vadim Nikolaevich Delaunay; December 22, 1947; Moscow, Russia
- Died: June 13, 1983 (aged 35); Paris, France
- Occupation: Poet
- Spouse: I. Belogorodkaya
- Writing career
- Notable work: Portraits in a Barbed Frame (1979)
- Notable awards: Vladimir Dal; 1984

Vadim Nikolaevich Delaunay (Russian: Вади́м Никола́евич Делоне́, IPA: [vɐˈdʲim nʲɪkɐˈlajɪvʲɪtɕ dʲɪlɐˈnʲɛ]; December 22, 1947, Moscow – June 13, 1983, Paris) was a Soviet poet and dissident, who participated in the 1968 Red Square demonstration of protest against military suppression of the Prague Spring.

== Biography ==
Delaunay was born to a Russian-French family of Soviet Intelligentsia. He was the son of Nikolai Borisovich Delone, a Soviet physicist. His grandfather, Boris Delaunay, was a prominent Soviet mathematician and creator of the Delaunay triangulation. Among his ancestors was marquis Bernard-René de Launay, the last governor of the Bastille, murdered by the attackers on that castle.

Delaunay studied at Moscow matshkola ("Mathematical School") No. 2, one of the best in the country at that time, then at the Department of Philology at the Moscow Pedagogical Institute. As a student, he also worked as a freelance author for the Literaturnaya Gazeta. Delaunay started to write poetry at the age of 13. His poetry was distributed by samizdat and some of it was published abroad.

Пуcкай грехи мне
не простят -
К тому предлогов слишком много,
Но если я просил
у Бога,
То - за других,
не за себя.

Let my sins
not be forgiven
the reasons for this are many
but if I ever prayed
to God for something
it was for others
never for myself

Vadim Delaunay

== Political activism ==
On January 22, 1967, Delaunay took part in a demonstration on Pushkin Square protesting the arrest Yuri Galanskov and others (leading to the Trial of the Four) as well as articles 70 and 190 of the Soviet Penal Code—"Anti-Soviet agitation" and "Libel against the Soviet Government". He was arrested and given a one-year suspended sentence (incidentally in accordance with article 190 of the Penal Code). His sentence was much lighter than that of another organizer of the same meeting, Vladimir Bukovsky, who got three years in a labor camp.

On September 1, 1967, together with Bukovsky and Kushev, he was sentenced to 1 year (conditionally) as a participant in a demonstration on Pushkin Square in defense of Galanskov, Dobrovolsky, and Lashkova.

Delaunay's sentence required him to move away from Moscow, so he went to Novosibirsk State University to a friend and pupil of his grandfather, Aleksandr Aleksandrov. In Novosibirsk, he continued his philology studies and wrote poetry. At that time, his first official foreign publications appeared in the Paris magazine Grani N66. Delaunay was an organizer of a concert by the Bard Alexander Galich, who was semi-legal at that time.

At the beginning of 1968, after the court hearing for Galanskov and Ginzburg, Delaunay wrote an open letter to Literaturnaya Gazeta in which he praised their bravery. The letter was published in the New York City newspaper The New Russian Word.

== 1968 Red Square demonstration ==
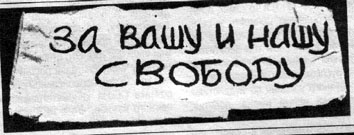
The historical banner of the Red Square demonstrators, For your freedom and ours. August 25, 1968

In June 1968, Delaunay returned to Moscow. On August 25, 1968, he and seven other dissidents organized the now-famous demonstration in support of the Prague Spring in Red Square near the Moscow Kremlin. Delaunay and Pavel Litvinov held the famous banner with the words "ЗА ВАШУ И НАШУ СВОБОДУ" ("For your freedom and ours").

Seven people were arrested, and in court, Delaunay stated that the five minutes of freedom on the square were worth the awaiting years in prison. The sentence by the court was prepared in advance, just as for other defendants. Delaunay was sentenced to two years and 10 months in a labor camp that he served in Tyumen Oblast in western Siberia.

== Emigration ==
In June 1971, Delaunay finished serving his sentence and returned to Moscow. In 1973, his wife Irina Belogorodskaya was arrested for her involvement with an underground journal, Chronicle of Current Events. In 1975, she was freed, and they both emigrated to France.

== Death ==
On 13 June 1983, Delaunay died of a heart attack in Paris at the age of 35. In 1984, his book of poetry Verses: 1963–1983 was published. In that same year, he was posthumously awarded the Vladimir Dal prize. His poetry has been published in Russia since 1989.
