= Kashpir Ganusov =

16th-century Russian bellfounder

Kashpir Ganusov (Russian: Кашпир Ганусов) was a Russian bellfounder of the 16th century.

The information about Kashpir Ganusov is scarce. It is difficult to tell what nationality he was or where he came from. We can only cautiously assume that Kashpir Ganusov was one of those craftsmen who had left the Grand Duchy of Lithuania in the first half of the 16th century. According to the Moscow Cannon Yard documents and archives, Kashpir Ganusov was working at the court of Ivan the Terrible in 1550s. In 1554, the cannon yard produced a huge bell weighing 19,657 kg, which would later receive the name of Lebed’ (Лебедь, or "swan"). This bell has not survived to this day, but we only know of one bell maker in Moscow of that time, who could have cast it. Based on this, Kashpir Ganusov is considered the maker of this bell (or his predecessor, whose name is unknown).

At a certain point in time, Kashpir Ganusov moved his activities to Smolensk. According to some documents of the 19th century, there were quite a few arquebuses along the fortress walls of Smolensk with Ganusov's name on them (and his apprentices’ names, as well). One of the most famous pieces of ammunition made by Kashpir Ganusov is an arquebus named Ostraya Panna (Острая Панна), then located at the Government Warehouse (Казённый амбар) in Smolensk. It weighed 185 poods (3,030 kg). The engraving on this arquebus says that it was made by Kashpir Ganusov in the summer of 1564. There are no other known arquebuses with Ganusov's name on them, but some of them have the name of his most famous apprentice – Andrei Chokhov. It happened so that Chokhov had to recast his teacher's creation—the Lebed’ bell—after Devlet I Giray’s raid on Moscow in 1571. It is this very bell that is pictured on the so-called Kremlenagrad—the first detailed map of the Moscow Kremlin.

We also know about other Ganusov's apprentices, such as Bogdan Andreytokhov, Kuzmin Pervoy, Nikita Tupitsyn and Yuri Bochkaryov, who worked in Moscow between the second half of the 16th century and early 17th century. Semyon Dubinin, Ganusov's apprentice in Smolensk, would later move to Pskov. So far, we know nothing about Kashpir Ganusov since he was last mentioned in a document of the late 1560s.
