= Vladimir Krainov =

Vladimir Pavlovich Krainov (Russian: Владимир Павлович Крайнов) (born 28 December 1938) is a full professor in department of theoretical physics of the Moscow Institute of Physics and Technology in Dolgoprudny. Krainov's research concentrated on physics of atoms and molecules in intense laser fields and on the evolution of clusters in super-intense laser pulses.

Krainov authored books on Approximation Methods in Quantum Mechanics (with Arkady Migdal), 1973), Atoms in Strong Light Fields, Fundamentals of Nonlinear Optics of Atomic Gases and Multiphoton Processes in Atoms (with Nikolay Delone, 1985, 1988, 1994), Radiative Processes in Atomic Physics (with H. R. Reiss and B. M. Smirnov, 1997).
