= They Chose Freedom =

2005 Russian TV documentary series

- Они выбирали свободу
- Based on: stories of participants in dissident movement in the Soviet Union
- Directed by: Vladimir V. Kara-Murza
- Starring: Vladimir Bukovsky, Elena Bonner, Sergei Kovalev, Alexander Yessenin-Volpin, Anatoly Sharansky, Yuri Fyodorovich Orlov, Alexander Podrabinek, Eduard Kuznetsov, Pavel Litvinov, Naum Korzhavin, Natalya Gorbanevskaya, Viktor Fainberg, Vladimir Dremlyuga
- Narrated by: Vladimir V. Kara-Murza
- Country of origin: Russia
- Original languages: Russian; English

Production
- Producers: Vladimir A. Kara-Murza, Andrei Norkin, GeorgyTsikhiseli, Yuri Shtapura, Michael Borshchevsky, Andrei Gromov, Stanislav Lensky
- Editor: Evgenia Kara-Murza
- Running time: 86 min (2 of 4 episodes last 21 min and 2 other episodes last 22 min)

Original release
- Network: RTVi
- Release: 1 December 2005

They Chose Freedom (Russian: Они выбирали свободу, romanized: Oni vybirali svobodu) is a four-part TV documentary on the history of political dissent in the USSR from the 1950s to the 1990s. It was produced in 2005 by Vladimir Kara-Murza.

The documentary tells the story of the Soviet dissident movement from its emergence in the late 1950s with the weekly public Mayakovsky Square poetry readings in Moscow. The development of samizdat, opposition demonstrations held in Moscow such as the 1965 Glasnost meeting and 1968 Red Square demonstration, and the harsh repressions unleashed by Soviet authorities against dissenters including forced psychiatric "treatment", prison camps and deportations, are all part of the film's narrative.

The third episode deals with events leading to the collapse of Soviet dictatorship and the democratic revolution of August 1991. The final episode is dedicated to the period after 1991; in it former dissidents discuss why the emergence of democracy in Russia proved to be short-lived, and how it was possible that a former KGB officer, Vladimir Putin, was elected to the Russian presidency.

"They Chose Freedom" is narrated primarily through the interviews of dissidents themselves. The film's participants are Vladimir Bukovsky, Elena Bonner, Sergei Kovalev, Alexander Yessenin-Volpin, Anatoly Sharansky, Yuri Fyodorovich Orlov, Alexander Podrabinek, Eduard Kuznetsov, Pavel Litvinov, Naum Korzhavin, Natalya Gorbanevskaya, Viktor Fainberg and Vladimir Dremlyuga.

According to director Vladimir Kara-Murza, the principal goal of his documentary was to show that even a small group of citizens that is prepared to defend dignity and freedom is eventually able to prevail over a totalitarian dictatorship.

They Chose Freedom was premiered on RTVi network in October 2005. The Russian premiere of the film was held at the Sakharov Center in Moscow in December 2005. In June 2006 the screening of They Chose Freedom was held at the Cinema House in Ekaterinburg.

In February 2007 They Chose Freedom was presented at a human rights seminar in Harvard University. On 11 February 2014, the Harriman Institute and Institute of Modern Russia presented the English-language version of They Chose Freedom.

== See also ==
- Parallels, Events, People
