= Tsar Cannon =

Large Russian cannon made in 1586

- Царь-пушка
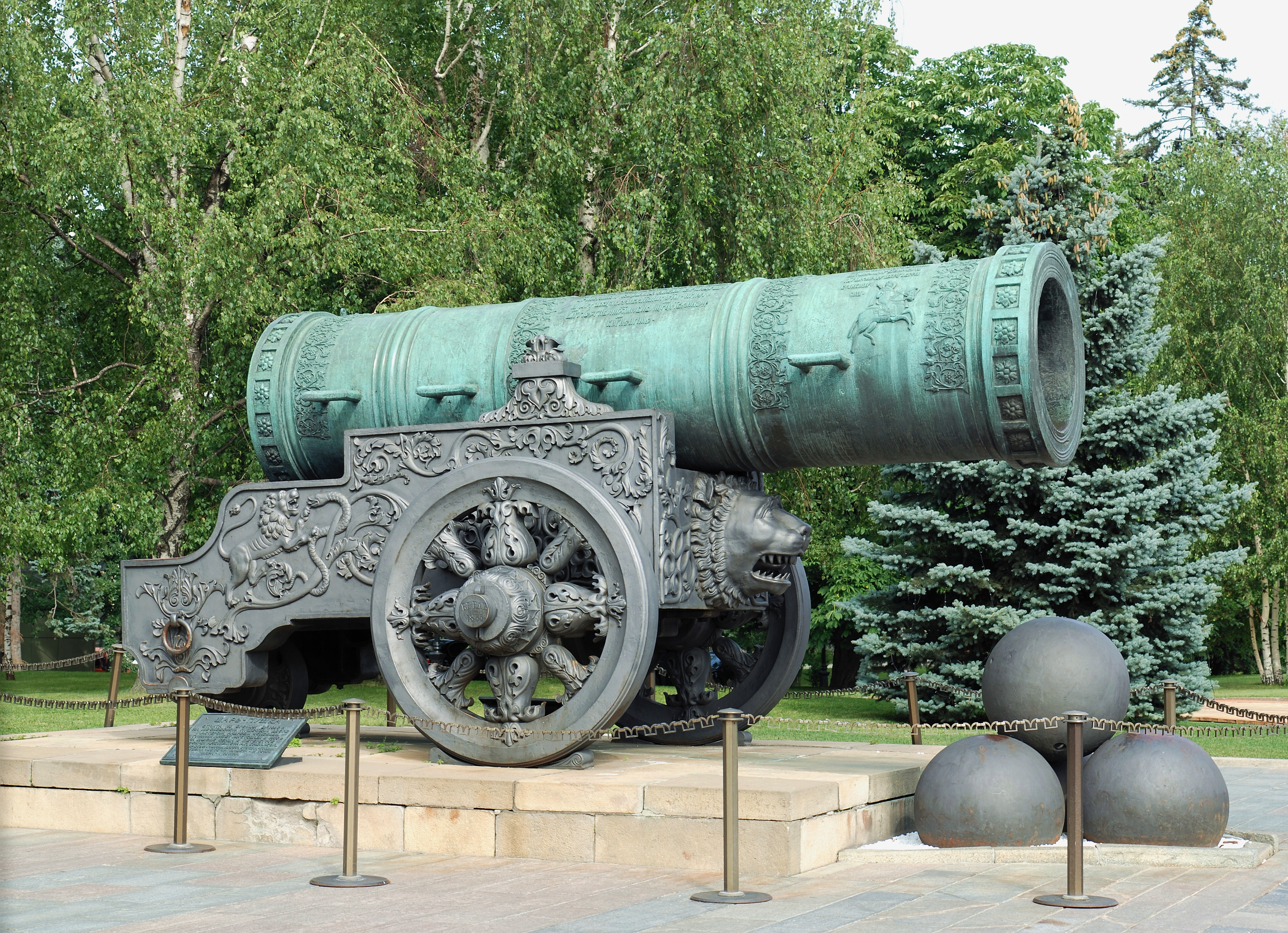
- A view of the Tsar Cannon, showing the lion's head cast into the carriage
- Interactive map of Tsar Cannon
- Location: Moscow, Russia
- Coordinates: 55°45′04″N 37°37′05″E
- Designer: Andrey Chokhov
- Type: Cannon
- Material: Bronze
- Length: 5.34 metres (17.5 ft)
- Completion date: 1586

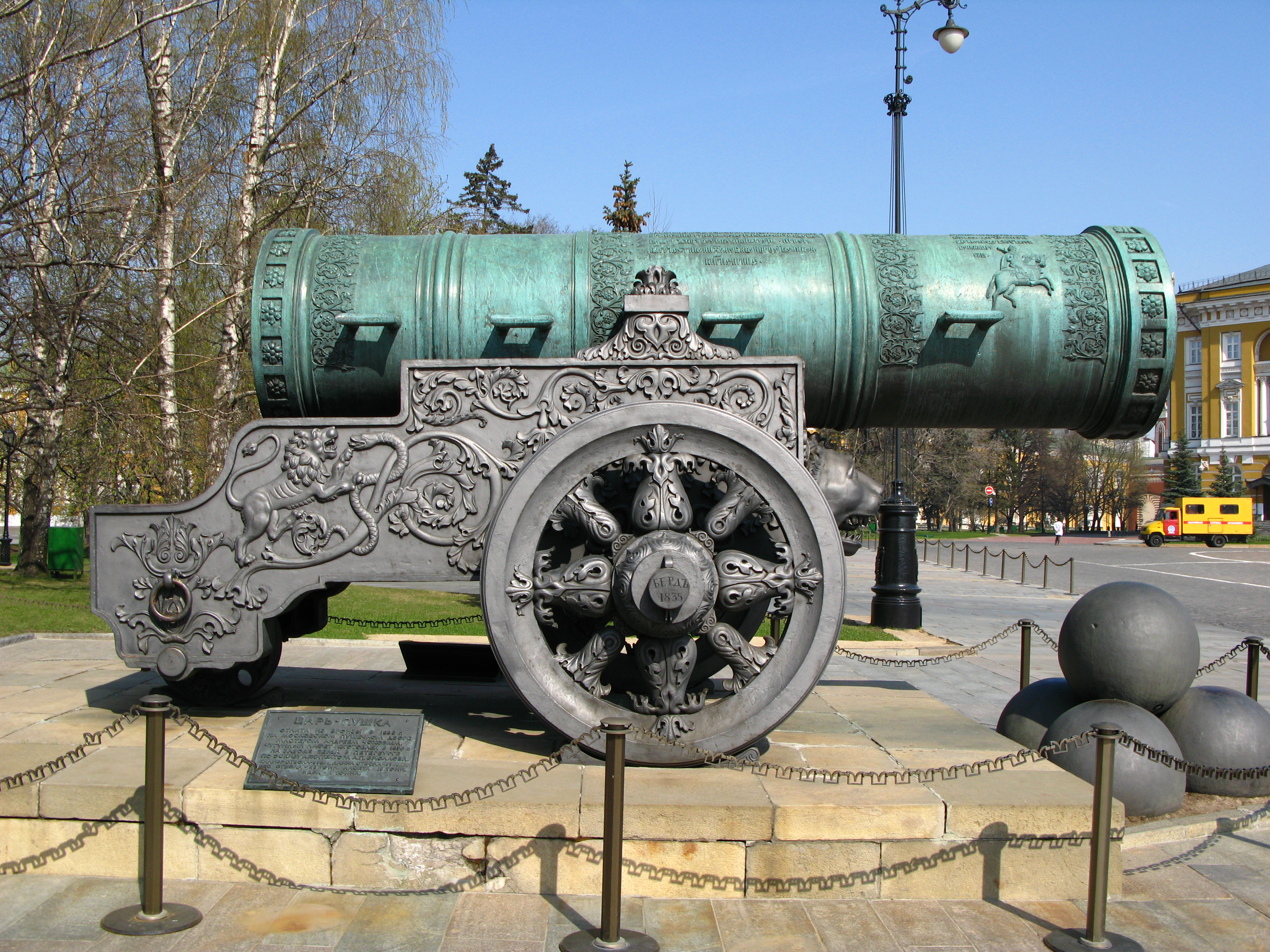
Side view of the Tsar Cannon

The Tsar Cannon (Russian: Царь-пушка, Tsar'-pushka) is a large early modern period artillery piece (known as a bombarda in Russian) on display on the grounds of the Moscow Kremlin. It is a monument of Russian artillery casting art, cast in bronze in 1586 in Moscow, by the Russian master bronze caster Andrey Chokhov. Mostly of symbolic impact, it was never used in a war. However, the cannon bears traces of at least one firing. Per the Guinness Book of Records it is the largest bombard by caliber in the world, and it is a major tourist attraction in the ensemble of the Moscow Kremlin.

== Description ==
The Tsar Cannon is located just past the Kremlin Armory, facing towards the Kremlin Senate. It is made of bronze, weighs 39,312 kilograms (86,668 lb) and has a length of 5.34 m (17.5 ft). Its bronze-cast barrel has an internal diameter of 890 mm (35.0 in), and an external diameter of 1,200 mm (47.2 in). The barrel has eight cast rectangular brackets for use in transporting the gun, which is mounted on a stylized cast iron gun carriage with three wheels.

The barrel is decorated with relief images, including an equestrian image of Tsar Fyodor Ivanovich, with a crown and a scepter in his hand on horseback. Above the front right bracket the message "The grace of God, Tsar and Great Duke Fyodor Ivanovich, Autocrat of All Russia" was cast. There were two more labels cast at the top of the barrel, to the right is "The decree of the faithful and Christ-king and the Grand Duke Fyodor Ivanovich, Sovereign Autocrat of all Great Russia with his pious and god-blessed queen, Grand Princess Irina"; While to the one to the left is "Cast in the city of Moscow in the summer of year 7904 (c. 1585 in Gregorian calendar), in his third summer state, by Andrey Chokov." The cannon-style gun carriage, added in 1835, is purely decorative. This weapon was never intended to be transported on or fired from this gun carriage.

According to one version, the name of this cannon, "Tsar", is associated with the image of Tsar Fyodor Ivanovich. However, it is more likely that this name owes to the massive size of this cannon. In old times the cannon is also sometimes called the "Russian Shotgun" (Дробовик Российский, Drobovik Rossiyskiy, lit. Shotgun Russian), because the gun was meant to shoot 800 kg (1,800 lb) stone grapeshot rather than true, solid cannonballs.

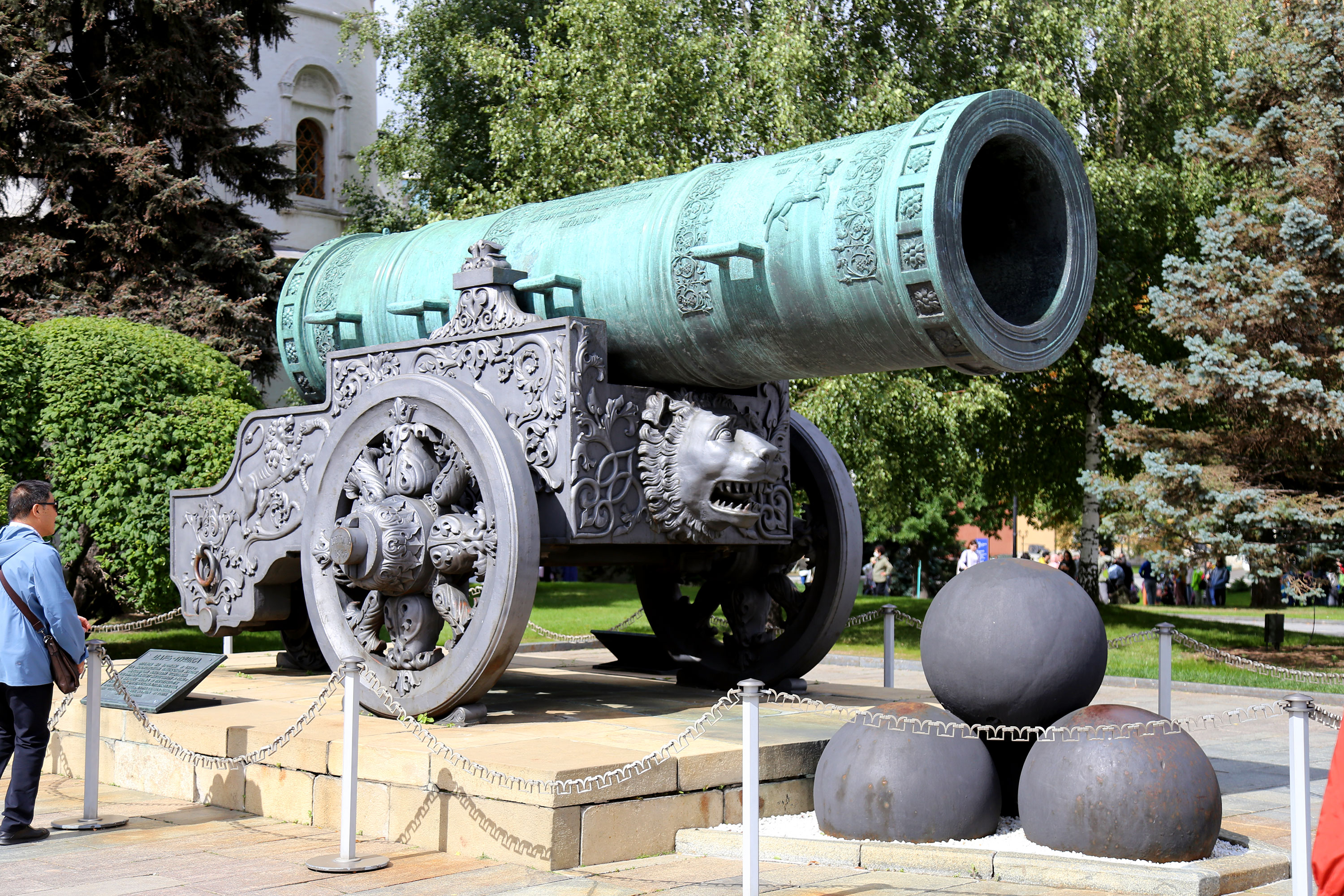
Tsar Cannon, Moscow Kremlin, Moscow, Russia

The cannon ought to be classified as only a mortar by its barrel length in modern classification, with the barrel length at only 6 calibers. However, in the 17th to the 18th century, it was rather called a "bombard cannon", since mortars at that time had barrel lengths of no more than 2.5 calibers, or 3.5 calibers at maximum for long-range mortars.

The spherical cast-iron projectiles located in front of the Tsar Cannon—each of which weighs approximately one ton—were produced in 1834 as a decoration, and are too large to have been used in the cannon. According to legend, the cannonballs were manufactured in St. Petersburg, and were intended to be a humorous addition and a symbol of the friendly rivalry between Moscow and St. Petersburg.

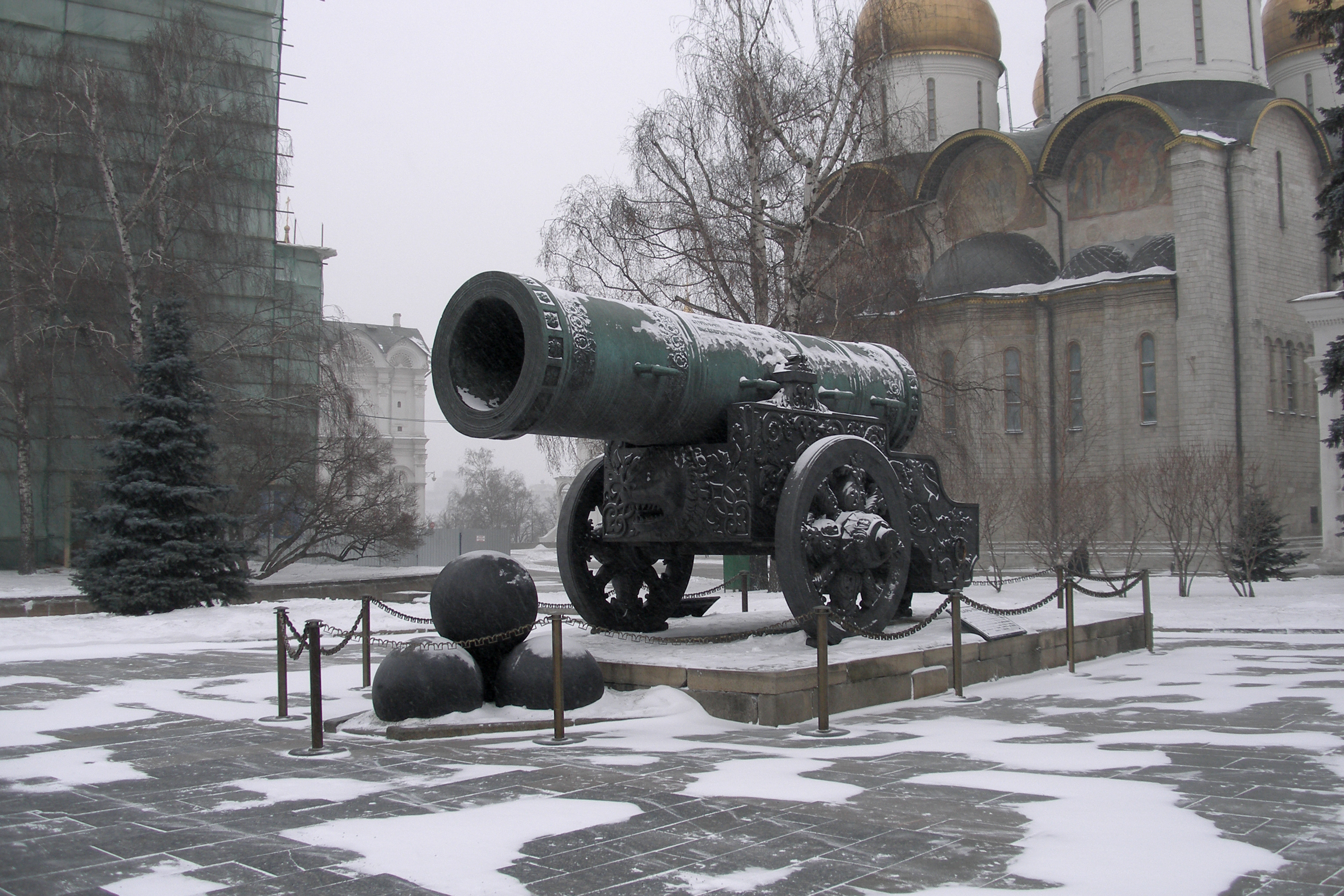
Tsar Cannon in 2006

Tsar Cannon in 2004

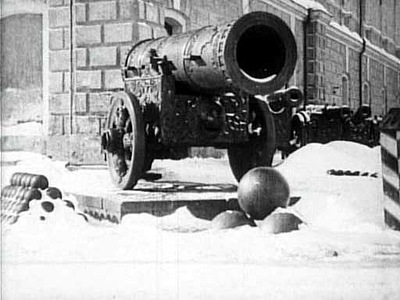
Tsar Cannon in 1908

== History ==
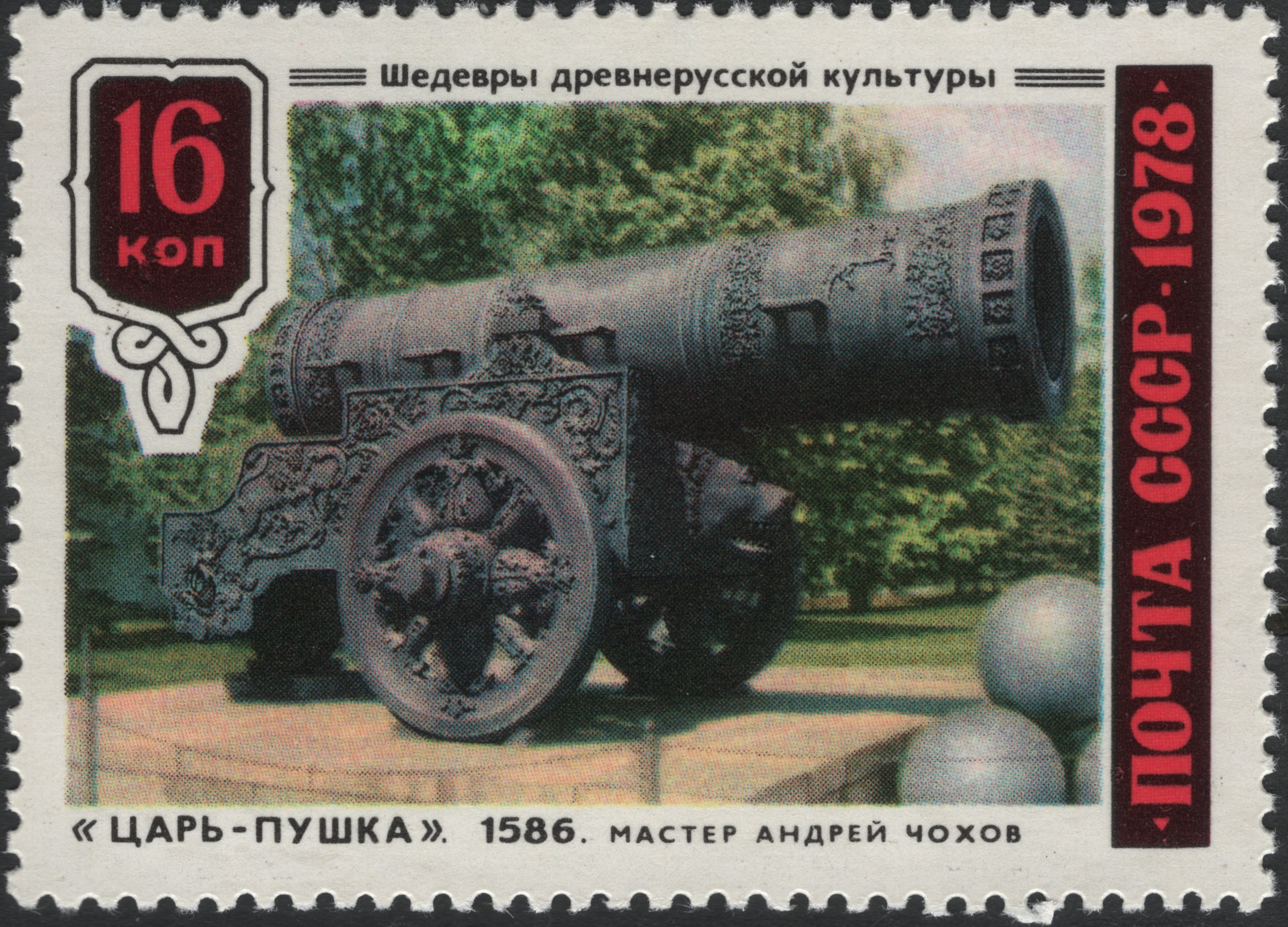
Tsar Cannon on a 1978 USSR postage stamp.

The cannon was cast in bronze in 1586, during the reign of Tsar Fyodor Ivanovich, in the Cannon yard, by Russian master Andrey Chokhov.

The carriages and the cannon itself were richly decorated in 1835 at the St. Petersburg plant of Berd, with designs by architect A. P. Bryullov and drawings engineer P. Ya. de Witte.

The Tsar Cannon was placed at several points around Moscow in its history. It is known to have been mounted on a special frame with a fixed inclination angle in the Red Square near the Place of Skulls in order to protect the eastern approaches to the Kremlin, indicating that it originally did have a practical application. However, by 1706, it was moved to the Kremlin Arsenal and mounted on a wooden gun carriage. It was not used during the French invasion of Russia, although Napoleon Bonaparte considered removing it to France as a war trophy. The wooden gun carriage burnt in the fire that consumed Moscow in 1812, and was replaced in 1835 by the present metal carriage, which disabled the firing function of the cannon.

In 1860, the Tsar Cannon was moved to its current location on Ivanovskaya Square near the Tsar Bell, which is similarly massive and is the largest bell in the world (but which has never been rung).

Voltaire joked that the Kremlin's two greatest items were a bell which was never rung and a cannon that was never fired. For a long time, there was a common theory that the Tsar Cannon was created only to impress foreigners of Russia's military powers. Thus, according to writer Albert Valentinov:

"...Andrey Chokov knew from the very first moment that this would not be a whopper cannon at all. Even if we assume that the barrel would fire grapeshot, a massive amount of propellant would be needed to push the two-ton shot, making it impossible for the cannon to be transported from one position to another. Therefore Chokhov did not mean to cast it as a functional cannon at all. His cannon is always only a symbol of Russian power and of the capabilities of the Russian industry. If we render a Russian master able to create such a whopper cannon, the smaller ones would have much less use. Therefore, the Tsar Cannon was put on display in the Kremlin for foreign diplomats."

The cannon was last restored in 1980 in the town of Serpukhov. It was thoroughly studied by specialists in the Artillery Academy at that time and gunpowder residue was found, indicating that the cannon had been fired at least once, hinged and dug into the ground.

Another theory by other researchers is that Tsar cannon never fired because of the bronze parts that would fade away after the shot, also due to the absence of a touch hole, which makes firing impractical. Although it could have been fired ceremonially with a long fuse and a reduced gunpowder load (and no shrapnel or cannon ball).

== Replicas ==
=== The Donetsk copy ===
In the spring of 2001, as commissioned by the management of the Moscow Udmort enterprise "OAO Izhstal", a replica of the cannon was cast in iron. The replica weighed 42 tons, with a single wheel at 1.5 tons, the kernel at 1.2 meters and a caliber of exactly 89 cm.

This copy was given as a present from Moscow to Donetsk, which was installed in front of the Donetsk City Hall in May 2001. There were two copies, with the other one produced in Izhevsk set in the premises of OAO Izhstal.

=== The Yoshkar-Ola copy ===
In 2007, another replica was installed in front of the National Art Gallery in Yoshkar-Ola. This replica was made in a scale of 1:2. This replica is incomplete, with ornaments changed or absent, and other details missing. The kernel of the cannon weighs about 12 tons, with the barrel and the carriage cast in steel, and the wheels being solid. Three staples were installed on the cannon for fastening cables when moving it. It was cast on Zvenigovsky Shipyard named after N. S. Butyakov. Initially, the ornaments were cut from wood, and then cast from metal. The copy was suitable for shooting, as the barrel and the core were welded together. Four ornamental cannonballs are located next to the cannon.

== Perm Tsar Cannon ==
The Tsar Cannon located in Perm was the world's largest 20-inch cast-iron cannon. Unlike other "Tsar cannon"s, the one in Perm was a military weapon. The cannon, nicknamed the "Perm Giant", was made in 1868, by the order of the Ministry of Marine to the Motovilikha manufacturing plant (which is PAO "Motovilikha Plants" today, manufacturing weapon systems such as cannons, mortars, howitzers, self-propelled artillery, "Grad", "Uragan" and "Smerch" rocket systems).

Tests were carried out with the gun on 16 August 1869, starting from firing from the shore of the Kama River (which is around 0.8–1 km wide). Later tests were carried out on this place until the end of Perestroika, with a lot happening in Soviet times. A certain F. V. Pestich, chief of the artillery of Kronstadt port attending most of the tests. The Perm cannon made a total of 314 shots, including grapeshot and bombs of different systems. As a result, the strength of the cannon was tested, and the weight of the powder charge was optimized. During the test, the charge weight was gradually increased to 120 kg. The set amount of propellant charge was 53 kg of black gunpowder in battle, putting the firing range to at most 1.2 km.

As quoted by writer Mikhail Osorgin, who witnessed the events:

…4 miles from the city, on the banks of the river, there was a cannon factory. Trying new guns, not testing shot projectiles (but shells seems more while there was none), but cannonballs. They shot it over the Kama River, landing in the forest, where trees were knocked down and deep ditches were dug by those cannonballs. I was not allowed to go there. Yes, and there was no one, except on Sundays, when the plant was silent as tiny spiders float on the river and boats carry people from the factory to Zakamskaya Pohulyanka. There were undershoots where the cannonball fell into the water, rising fountain spray and steam. There was no one, and no guns behind the Dalyu on the other side, only the smoke from the volleys indicated where the cannons were firing from… The river roared, shaking the air, and the mood of war was all over."

=== Specifications ===
- Barrel length: 4.9 m
- Caliber: 20 inches (508 mm)
- Wall thickness: 180 mm (At the muzzle) / 450 mm (In breech)
- Barrel weight: 45.9 tons (2800 pudi) (The total weight of the Moscow Tsar Cannon is only 39.3 tons (2400 pudi))
- Total weight: 98.3 tons (6000 pudi)
- Kernel weight: 459 kg (30 pudi)
- Powder charge weight: 61 kg (4 pudi)

A model of the Perm Tsar Cannon in full size was put before the Russian Pavilion at the 1873 World Exhibition in Vienna.

The Perm cannon was to take its place in Kronstadt at Fort Constantine (Russia), where a special carriage was already installed to ensure all-around coverage, and to protect St. Petersburg from the sea. Two such cannons were also intended to equip the armored frigate "Minin", which was built in St. Petersburg from 1866 to 1878.

However, the cannon never reached Kronstadt. The Giant has been returned to the road in Perm. This is due to the fact that the engineer-inventor Pavel Matveyevich Obukhov of Zlatoust has developed the technology to produce high-strength steel cannons. Having established a factory in St. Petersburg, he began producing lighter cannons, which were installed with breeched (the Krupp system), obsoleting the Perm cannon.

Emperor Alexander II's decision saved it from destruction, instead preserving it as a historical relic.

Today, the Perm Tsar Cannon is held on exhibition in the open museum of military equipment belonging to PAO "Motovilikha Plants".

== See also ==
- List of the largest cannon by caliber
- Tsar Bomba
- Tsar Bell
