= 1968 Red Square demonstration =

Demonstration against the Soviet invasion of Czechoslovakia

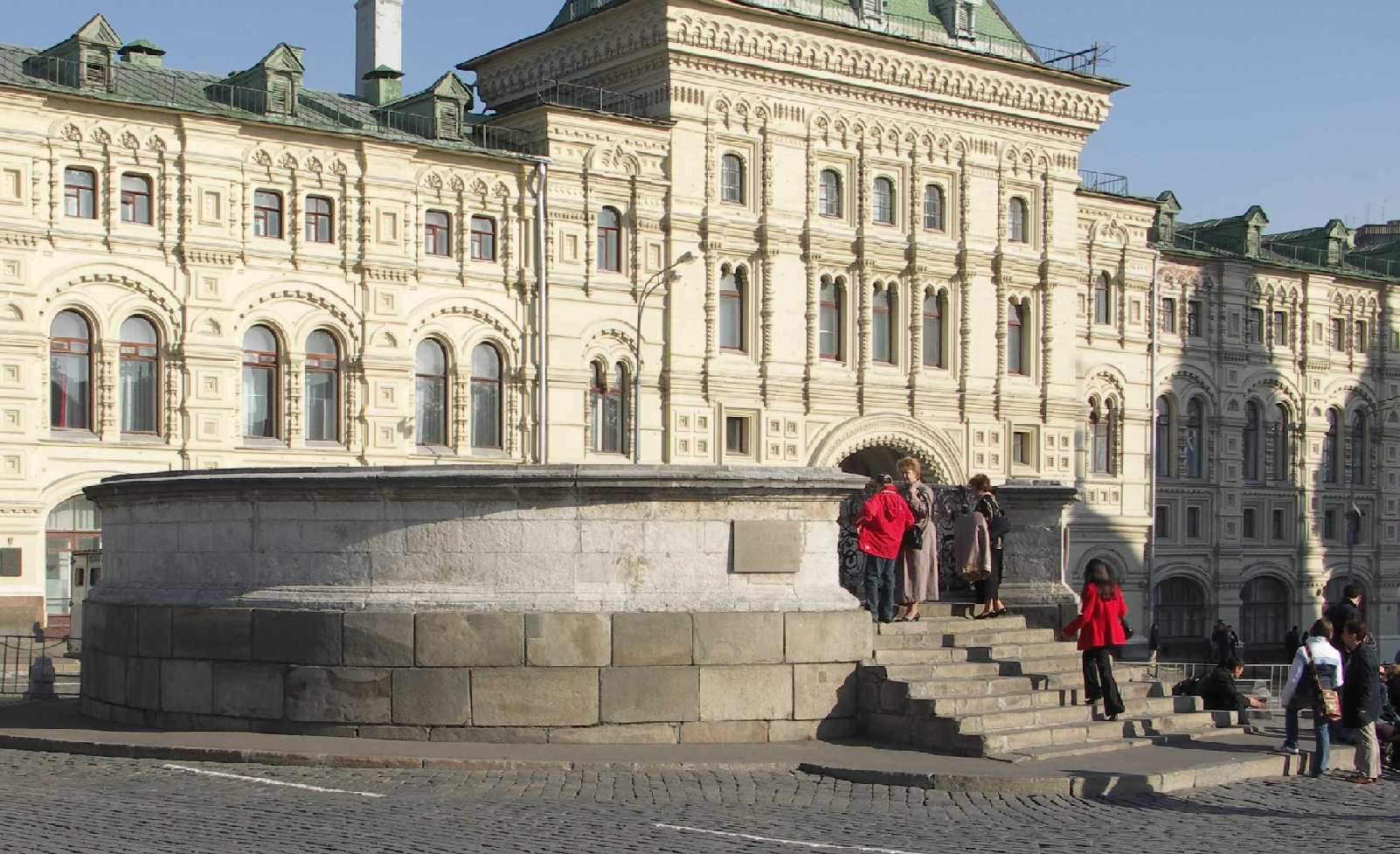
- Place of the demonstration at the Red Square in Moscow
- Date: 25 August 1968; 57 years ago
- Time: Noon
- Location: Lobnoye Mesto, Red Square, Moscow
- Cause: Warsaw Pact invasion of Czechoslovakia
- Participants: Larisa Bogoraz, Konstantin Babitsky, Vadim Delaunay, Vladimir Dremliuga, Pavel Litvinov, Natalya Gorbanevskaya, Viktor Fainberg, Tatiana Baeva.

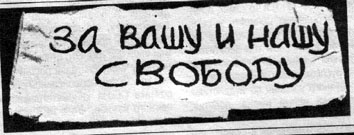
"For your freedom and ours", one of the banners of the demonstrators, 1968

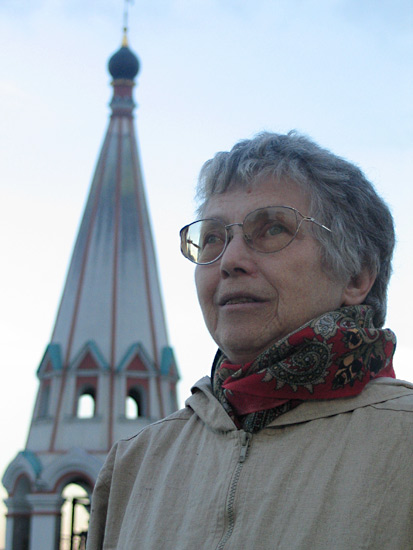
Natalya Gorbanevskaya, 2005

Pavel Litvinov during his exile to Siberia

Larisa Bogoraz

Vadim Delaunay, 1967

The 1968 Red Square demonstration (Russian: Демонстра́ция 25 а́вгуста 1968 го́да) took place in Moscow on 25 August 1968. It was a protest by eight demonstrators against the invasion of Czechoslovakia on the night of 20–21 August 1968 by the Soviet Union and its Warsaw Pact allies, crushing the Prague Spring, the challenge to centralised planning and censorship by communist leader Alexander Dubček.

The protest took place at the Lobnoye Mesto (Place of Proclamation) on Red Square next to the Kremlin, to avoid any accusation of a violation of public order. It was a nonviolent, sit-down demonstration. However, all but one of the protestors were quickly and roughly arrested by police and plainclothes KGB men.

== The protest, 25 August ==
The protest began at noon as eight protesters (Larisa Bogoraz, Konstantin Babitsky, Vadim Delaunay, Vladimir Dremliuga, Pavel Litvinov, Natalya Gorbanevskaya, Viktor Fainberg, and Tatiana Baeva) sat at the Lobnoye Mesto and held a small Czechoslovak flag and placards bearing various slogans:

- "We are losing our best friends" ("мы теряем лучших друзей"),
- "Long live free and independent Czechoslovakia" ("Ať žije svobodné a nezávislé Československo!", in Czech),
- "Shame to the occupiers" ("Позор оккупантам!"),
- "Hands off the ČSSR" ("Руки прочь от ЧССР!"),
- "For your freedom and ours" ("За вашу и нашу свободу!"),
- "Freedom for Dubček" ("Свободу Дубчеку!").

Within a few minutes, seven of the protesters were assaulted, brutally beaten and loaded into cars by KGB operatives. The Czechoslovak flag was broken, and the placards were confiscated. Since Natalya Gorbanevskaya had recently given birth, she was not made to stand trial. The other protesters convinced 21-year-old Tatiana Baeva to declare that she had been at the scene by accident, and she was released soon after.

The KGB failed to find out which protester was holding which banner; therefore, all the banners were attributed to each protester, except for Tatiana Baeva, who was released. The banners were branded by the KGB as "anti-Soviet".

== Trial, 9–11 October 1968 ==
During the investigation and trial, the defence revealed several inconsistencies in the accusations. One of the eyewitnesses declared that he saw protesters leaving the GUM, a large store in the vicinity, even though this store is closed on Sundays. Additionally, all eyewitnesses happened to be from the same military division, even though they all claimed that they ended up on Red Square accidentally. However, these inconsistencies were not taken into account during the trial.

None of the demonstrators pleaded guilty.

=== Verdict and sentence ===
Lawyers for the defense (all Communist Party of the Soviet Union members appointed and paid for by the State) demonstrated that the protestors had acted without criminal intent, but the protesters on trial all received sentences of up to several years imprisonment or exile and in two cases they were sent to psychiatric prison hospitals.

Vadim Delaunay and Vladimir Dremlyuga were sentenced to three years in a penal colony. Victor Fainberg, who had his teeth knocked out during the arrest, did not appear in court but was sent to a psychiatric prison. Larisa Bogoraz was sentenced to four years of exile to a remote Siberian settlement in the Irkutsk Region. Konstantin Babitsky was sentenced to three years of exile. Pavel Litvinov was sentenced to five years' exile. Natalya Gorbanevskaya was released the same day but later sent to a psychiatric prison.

In his "Attorney's waltz" singer and rights activist Yuliy Kim claimed that the sentences had been decided before the trial. In another song, "Ilyich", Kim mentions Yuri Andropov's and Leonid Brezhnev's anger at the demonstration, and refers to three of the protestors by name -- Pavel Litvinov, Natalya Gorbanevskaya and Larisa Bogoraz.

The story of the August 1968 demonstration is recounted in the 2005 documentary They Chose Freedom.

== Belated public recognition ==
In 1990 (following the Velvet Revolution), seven of the protesters were awarded honorary citizenship of Prague.

During the conflict in South Ossetia, August 2008, the former president of the Czech Republic, Václav Havel, expressed his sympathies for the protesters of 1968. Czech Premier Mirek Topolánek recognized the heroism of the protesters with awards.

There was no recognition on the part of the Russian government. On 24 August 2008, the similar demonstration with the slogan For your freedom and ours was held in the same place.

On 25 August 2013, the 45th anniversary of the demonstration, Gorbanevskaya and several of her friends recreated the original protest, again featuring the "For your freedom and ours" banner. Ten participants (among them Delaunay's son Sergey) were arrested almost immediately and taken to a police station. They were soon arraigned and released pending court appearance on charges of failing to secure prior permission for a political rally, a misdemeanor under current Russian law.

In 2018, three participants at another repeat demonstration were arrested. On February 5, 2025, Tatiana Baeva, who was one of the participant members of the 1968 Red Square demonstration died at the age of 77.

== Bibliography ==
- Gorbanevskaya, Natalya (1972). Red Square at Noon. New York: Holt, Rinehart and Winston. ISBN 978-0-03-085990-8.
- Alexeyeva, Lyudmila (1987). Soviet Dissent: Contemporary Movements for National, Religious, and Human Rights. Carol Pearce, John Glad (trans.). Middletown, Conn.: Wesleyan University Press. ISBN 0-8195-6176-2.
- Boobbyer, Philip (2005). Conscience, dissent and reform in Soviet Russia. Routledge. ISBN 0415331862.

== See also ==
- Political abuse of psychiatry in the Soviet Union
