= Nina M. Litvinova =

Russian (Soviet) zoologist (1945–2026)

Nina Litvinova (9 August 1945 – 12 May 2026) was a Russian oceanographer, dissident and human rights activist. From the 1960s, she helped political prisoners in the Soviet Union and later in Russia.

== Life ==
Litvinova was a granddaughter of Soviet foreign minister Maxim Litvinov, who served from 1930 to 1939, under Joseph Stalin, as the People's Commissar for Foreign Affairs of the USSR, and later as ambassador to Cuba and the United States. She was also the sister of Soviet dissident Pavel Litvinov, who in August 1968 was one of the eight people who protested in Red Square against the occupation of Czechoslovakia.

Throughout her life, Litvinova helped political prisoners and worked on human rights issues. The human rights group Memorial published an obituary describing Litvinova as “a participant in the dissident movement who did an enormous amount to support political prisoners in the 1960s–1980s and in the 2000s–2020s.” In her final years, she attended court hearings, including the trial of historian Yury Dmitriev and that of Memorial co-founder Oleg Orlov.

== Death ==
In May 2026, Litvinova died by suicide. In a farewell letter, she wrote that she had taken her own life because of the Russian invasion of Ukraine and the repression of opponents of the Russian regime. "I must leave. Life has become unbearable for me, ever since Putin attacked Ukraine and began killing innocent people, while thousands in our country are endlessly imprisoned for opposing war and murder," Litvinova wrote.
