= Nahum Korzhavin =

Russian poet (1925–2018)

Naum Moiseyevich Korzhavin
- Наум Моисеевич Коржавин
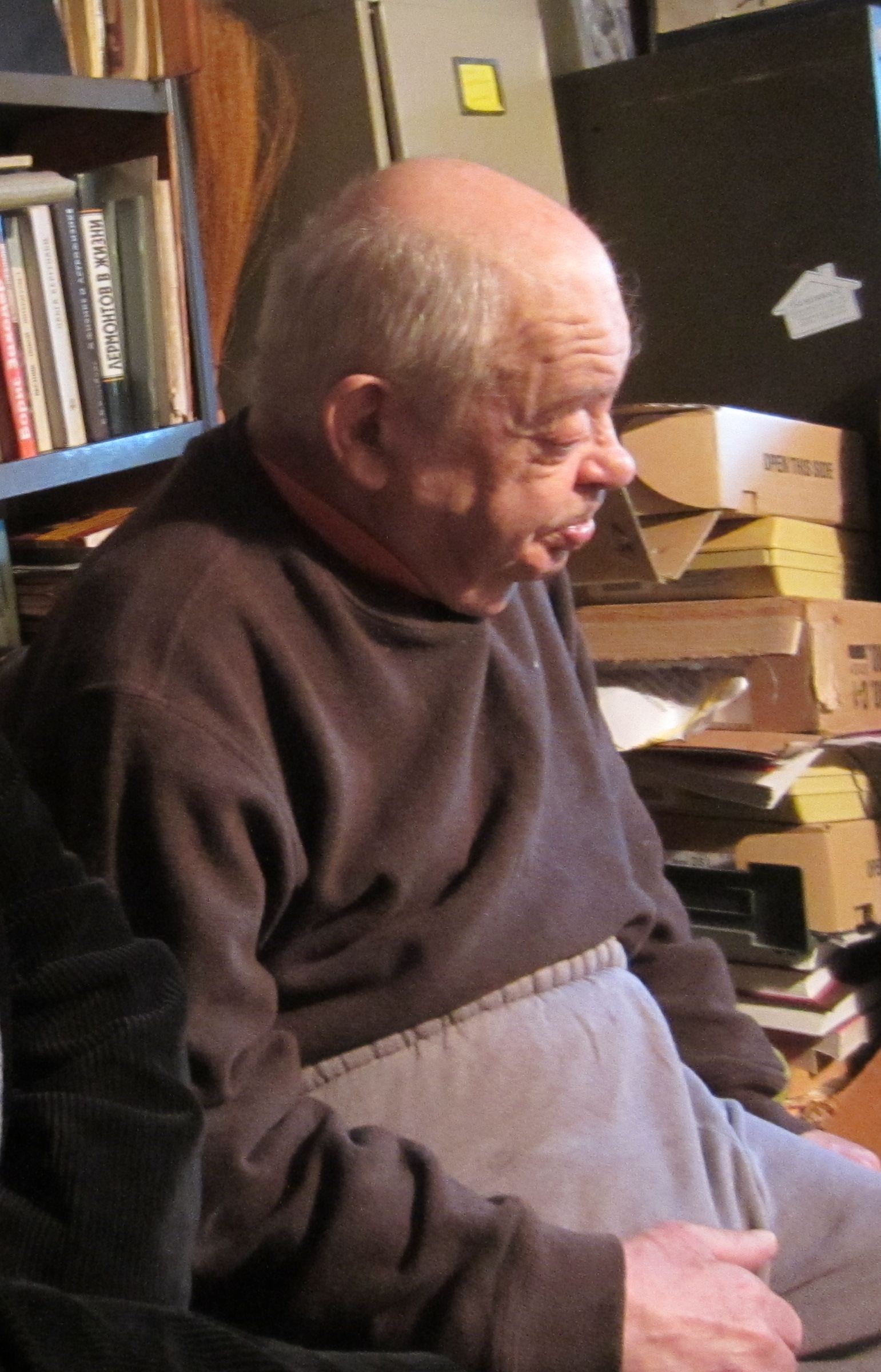
- Naum Korzhavin in 2012
- Born: Naum Moiseyevich Mandel; 14 October 1925; Kiev, Ukrainian SSR, Soviet Union
- Died: 22 June 2018 (aged 92); Chapel Hill, North Carolina, United States
- Citizenship: Soviet Union, United States
- Education: Maxim Gorky Literature Institute
- Occupation: writer
- Writing career
- Language: Russian
- Genres: poetry, essays, memoirs
- Notable awards: Big Book National Award (2006)

Nahum (Naum) Moiseyevich Korzhavin (Russian: Нау́м Моисе́евич Коржа́вин; real surname Mandel, Russian: Мандель; 14 October 1925 – 22 June 2018) was a Russian poet of Jewish descent, a dissident and emigrant who moved to Boston, Massachusetts in 1973 and lived there 43 years. He spent the last two years of his life in Chapel Hill, North Carolina, to be near family.

Korzhavin was given the Big Book National Award-2006 for his contribution to literature. He was the only Big Book finalist to get into the short-list with a book of memoirs.

Korzhavin created a vivid detailed picture of his life and his country in his prose work under the expressive title In Temptations of the Bloody Epoch.

In 2005 Korzhavin participated in They Chose Freedom, a four-part television documentary on the history of the Soviet dissident movement.
