= Donkey walk =

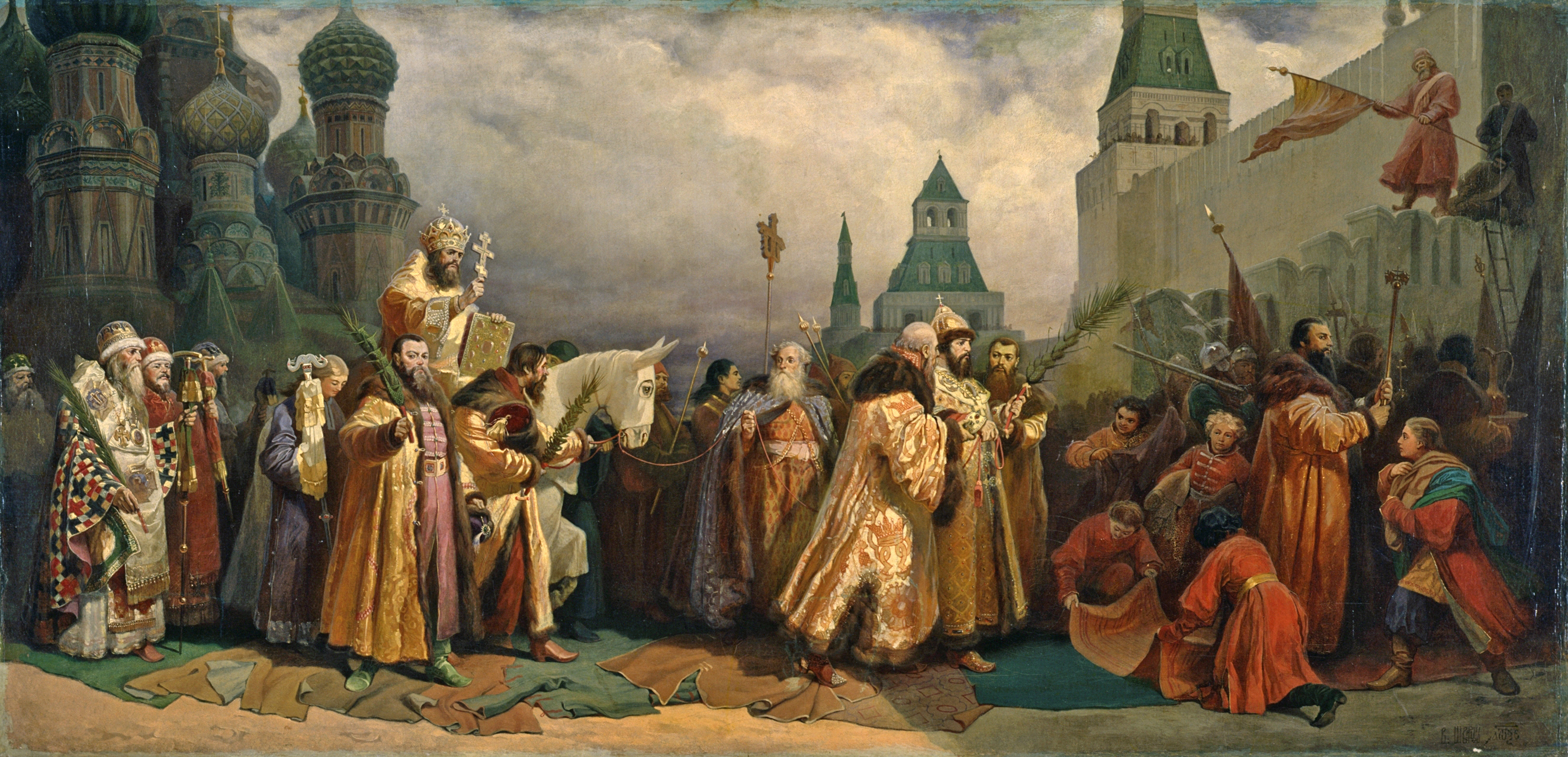
The donkey walk of tsar Alexis (Vyacheslav Schwarz, 1865).

The donkey walk (Russian: хождение на осляти, шествие на осляти) is a Russian Orthodox Palm Sunday ritual re-enactment of Jesus Christ's entry into Jerusalem. The best known historical donkey walk was practised in Moscow from 1558 until 1693. The Metropolitan and later Patriarch of Moscow, representing Jesus Christ, rode on a donkey, while the Tsar of Russia humbly led the donkey on foot.

From 1561 to 1655 the donkey walk began in the Kremlin and terminated at Trinity Cathedral (now Saint Basil's Cathedral), but in 1656 Patriarch Nikon reversed the order of procession. The donkey walk and the Great Blessing of Waters on Epiphany were the two most important Russian court ceremonies, emphasizing the tsar's respect for the Eastern Orthodox Church, projecting an image (not necessarily true) of harmony in politics. Similar rituals in other cities existed until 1678 until Moscow monopolized the ritual. The tradition was abolished by Peter I.

Donkey walks have been occasionally recreated in the 2000s.

== Contemporary accounts ==
In the first half of the 16th century the ritual, of either Western or Byzantine origin, emerged in Novgorod, where the Archbishop of Novgorod and the namestnik played the key roles. Macarius, Metropolitan of Moscow, imported the custom into Moscow. The first attested donkey walk attended by Macarius and by Tsar Ivan the Terrible took place in 1558, when Trinity Cathedral was under construction. After the completion of Trinity Cathedral in 1561 the processions terminated at its western sanctuary (dedicated to the Entry into Jerusalem); the cathedral itself became known as Jerusalem (the current popular name "Saint Basil's Cathedral", emerged only in the 18th century). Western visitors left descriptions of the procession as it played out before the 1598-1613 Time of Troubles:

One of the Emperours noble men leadeth the horse by the head, but the Emperour himselfe goying on foote, leadeth the horse by the ends of the reine of his bridle with one of his handes, and in the other of his handes he had a braunch of a Palme tree: after this followed the rest of the Emperours Noble men and Gentlemen, with a great number of other people

— Richard Hakluyt, The Principall Navigations Voiages and Discoveries of the English Nation, 1589.

The capital city, Moscow, is split into three parts; the first of them, called Kitai-gorod, is encircled with a solid thick wall. It contains an extraordinary beautiful church, all clad in shiny bright gems, called Jerusalem. It is the destination of an annual Palm Sunday walk, when the Grand Prince must lead a donkey carrying the Patriarch, from the church of Virgin Mary to the church of Jerusalem which stands next to the citadel walls. Here is where the most illustrious princely, noble and merchant families live. Here is, also, the main muscovite marketplace: the trading square is built as a brick rectangle, with twenty lanes on each side where the merchants have their shops and cellars...

— Peter Petreius, History of the Great Duchy of Moscow, 1620

Templum S. Trinitatis, etiam Hierusalem dicitur; ad quo Palmarum fest Patriarcha asino insidens a Caesare introducitur.
Temple of Holy Trinity, also called Jerusalem, to where the tsar leads the Patriarch, sitting on a donkey, on the Palm Holiday.

— Legend of Peter's map of Moscow, 1597, as reproduced in the Bleau Atlas

Mikhail Petrovich Kudryavtsev noted that all cross processions of the period began, as described by Petreius, from the Dormition Cathedral, passed through St. Frol's (Saviour's) Gate and ended at Trinity Cathedral, popularly known simply as Jerusalem. For these processions the Kremlin itself became an open-air temple, properly oriented from its "narthex" (Cathedral Square) in the west, through the "royal doors" (Saviour's Gate), to "sanctuary" (Trinity Cathedral) in the east.

Ivan the Terrible mocked and abused the ritual in his 1570 campaign against the Novgorod clergy. After looting the churches of Novgorod, Ivan demoted the archbishop of Novgorod and ordered him, a tonsured monk, to mount a mare backwards, to ride to Moscow in a skomorokh's garb, to marry there and to lead the life of a skomorokh until the end of his days.

== Nikon's reform ==
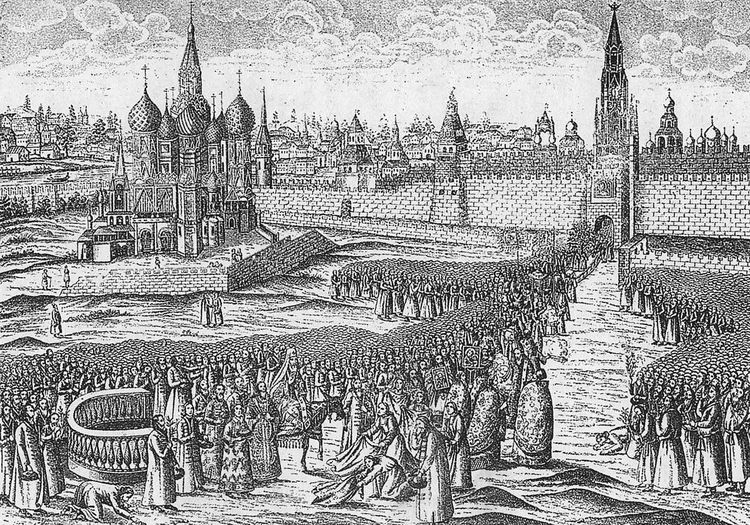
The Donkey Walk. Dutch print, 17th century.

Patriarch Nikon, among his other reforms, reversed the order of the donkey walk; since 1656 it began at Lobnoye Mesto (allegory of Golgotha) and terminated in the Kremlin (the new allegory of Jerusalem). Nikon's voluntary retirement in 1658 vacated the Patriarch's seat de facto but not de jure; Metropolitan Pitirim of Krutitsy acted for the Patriarch during the 1659 donkey walk, causing Nikon's instant, unforgiving response. Nikon, still the head of Russian Orthodox Church, banished Pitirim from his seat and bitterly reprimanded Alexis I of Russia as an accomplice in "promiscuity of spirit". He wrote that for him riding the donkey was a fearful act of being a living icon of Christ himself, a deed and burden that only the Head of Church may bear. Pitirim repeated his act in 1661 and 1662 and was anathemized by Nikon although the retired patriarch's rage had little effect in real politics and Pitirim remained at the helm of the church.

According to a description by Adam Olearius, who attended the 1636 procession, the direction of the donkey walk has already been changed by that time. Olearius left an account of the procession starting at Lobnoye Mesto (incorrectly called Execution Place but in reality only a platform for public announcements) and proceeding into the Saviour's Gate of the Kremlin. The procession was led by a wagon carrying "a beautiful tree whose branches are hung with apples and various other treats" and six boys singing Hosanna. Similar processions, without the tree, were also held on the day of enthronement of the Patriarch in Moscow and ordination of the bishops in other cities, but in 1678 donkey walks outside of Moscow were prohibited by the Synod.

== Demise of the tradition ==
Feeble-bodied tsar Feodor III of Russia, the eldest surviving son of Alexis, was too weak to attend the ceremonies of 1676 and 1677. By 1678 he recovered and participated in that year's donkey walk along with Patriarch Joachim; later, he seems to have attended most of the ceremonies of his short reign until failing to take part in the donkey walk of 1681.

After Fyodor's death the throne passed to co-rulers, brothers Ivan and Peter. In 1683 Ivan was sick and Peter led the donkey alone but in the next few years Ivan and Peter participated in the ritual together. As Ivan's health declined, Peter became the sole leader of the procession. After the death of his mother (January 25, 1694) he cancelled the procession; in fact, 1694 became the last year of Muscovite court ritual as it existed under the first Romanovs.

Peter, who forced the church into submission to the state, needed no external shows of political harmony and formally abolished the ritual in 1697; instead, it was replaced with a mock drunk orgy of Peter's statesmen and minstrels.

== Modern Russia ==
The ritual was resurrected in the 2000s in Rostov, with key roles being played by the Archbishop of Rostov and Yaroslavl and the governor of Yaroslavl Oblast. Saint Petersburg officially debuted the tradition on Palm Sunday 2014 with the civil and Orthodox leaders of the city in the leading roles.

== See also ==
- History of Moscow
- Feast of the Ass

== Sources ==
- Bushkovitch, Paul (2001). Peter the Great: the struggle for power, 1671-1725. Cambridge University Press. ISBN 978-0-521-80585-8.
- Gardner, Johann von; Morosan, Vladimir (2000). Russian Church Singing: History from the origins to the mid-seventeenth century. St Vladimir's Seminary Press. ISBN 978-0-88141-046-4.
- Komech, A. I., Pluzhnikov, V. I. (editors) (1982). Pamyatniku arhitektury Moskvy. Kremlin, Kitai Gorod, tsentralnye ploschadi (Памятники архитектуры Москвы. Кремль, Китай-город, центральные площади) (in Russian). Iskusstvo.
- Kudryavtsev, Mikhail Petrovich (2008). Moskva - trety Rim (Москва - третий Рим) (in Russian). Troitsa. ISBN 978-5-85482-008-0. (second edition; first edition: 1991)
- Madariaga, Isabel (2006). Ivan the Terrible. Yale University Press. ISBN 978-0-300-11973-2.
- Muir, Edward (2005). Ritual in early modern Europe. Cambridge University Press. ISBN 978-0-521-84153-5.
- Peter Petreius (1997). History of the Great Duchy of Moscow (История о великом княжестве Московском) (in Russian). Rita Print, Moscow. ISBN 5-89486-001-6. (Original book written in 1615 and printed in Leipzig, in German language, in 1620; translated to Russian in 1847 by Mikhail Shemyakin).
- Uspensky, Boris (1994). Semiotika istorii. Semiotika kultury (Семиотика истории. Семиотика культуры) (in Russian). Gnozis (Moscow). ISBN 5-7333-0385-9.
