= For our freedom and yours =

Unofficial motto of Poland

Za naszą i waszą wolność
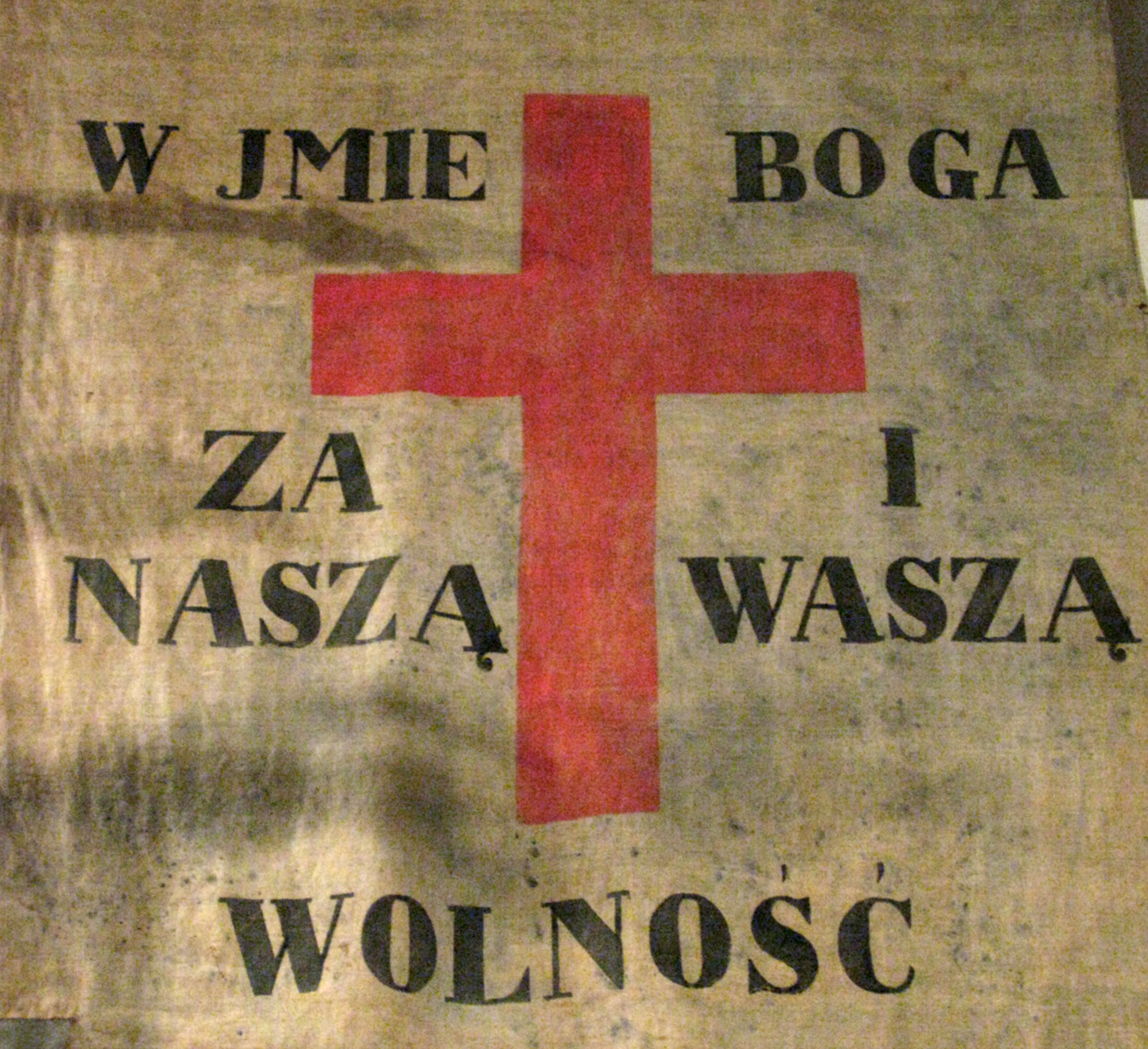
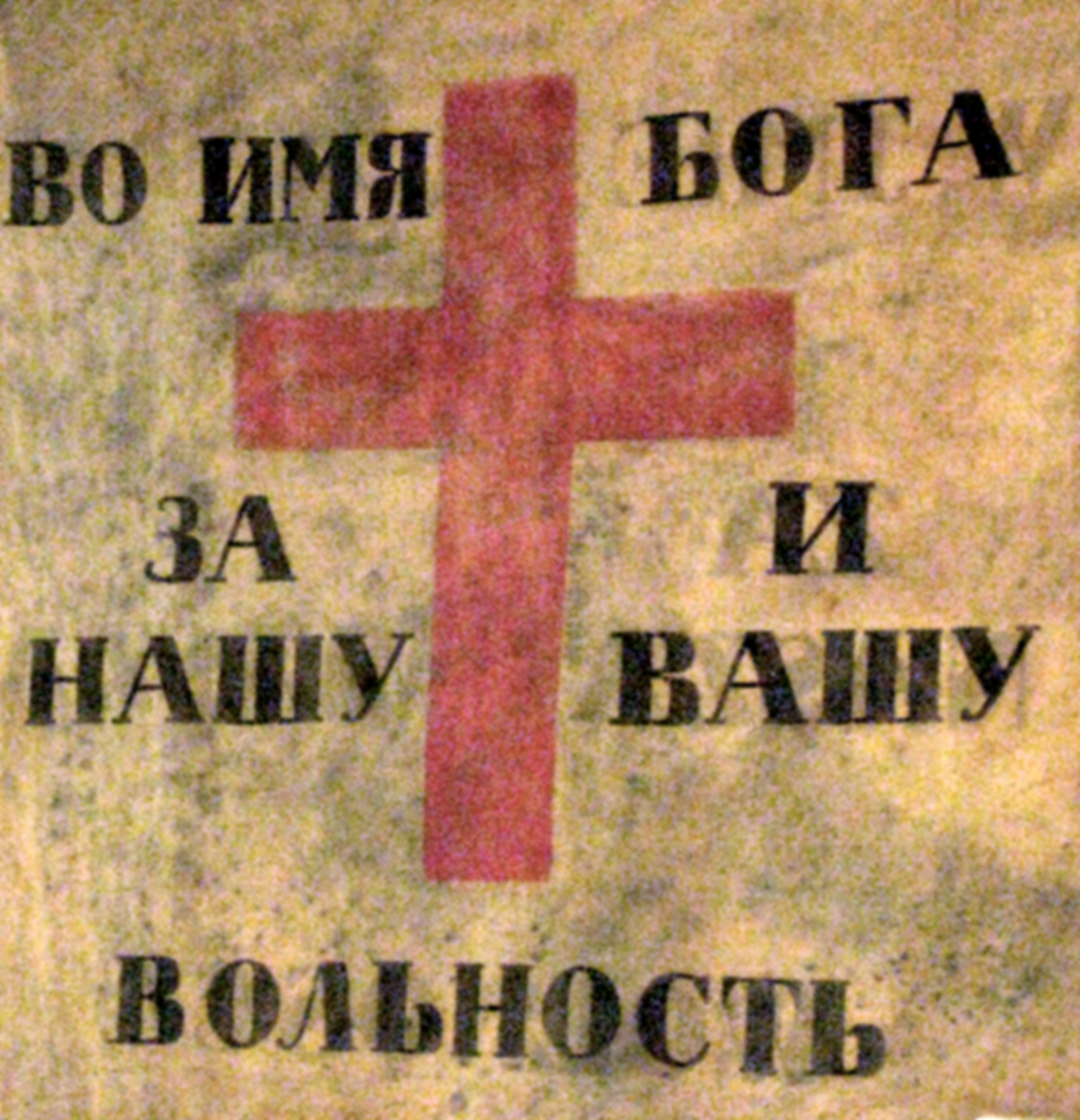
- Flag of the November Uprising written in Polish, 1831 Reverse side of the flag written in Russian, 1831
- Origin: November Uprising
- Original form: W imię Boga za Naszą i Waszą Wolność (transl. In the name of God, For our freedom and yours)
- Context: Commemoration of the Decembrist revolt
- Coined by: Joachim Lelewel
- Meaning: For our freedom and yours

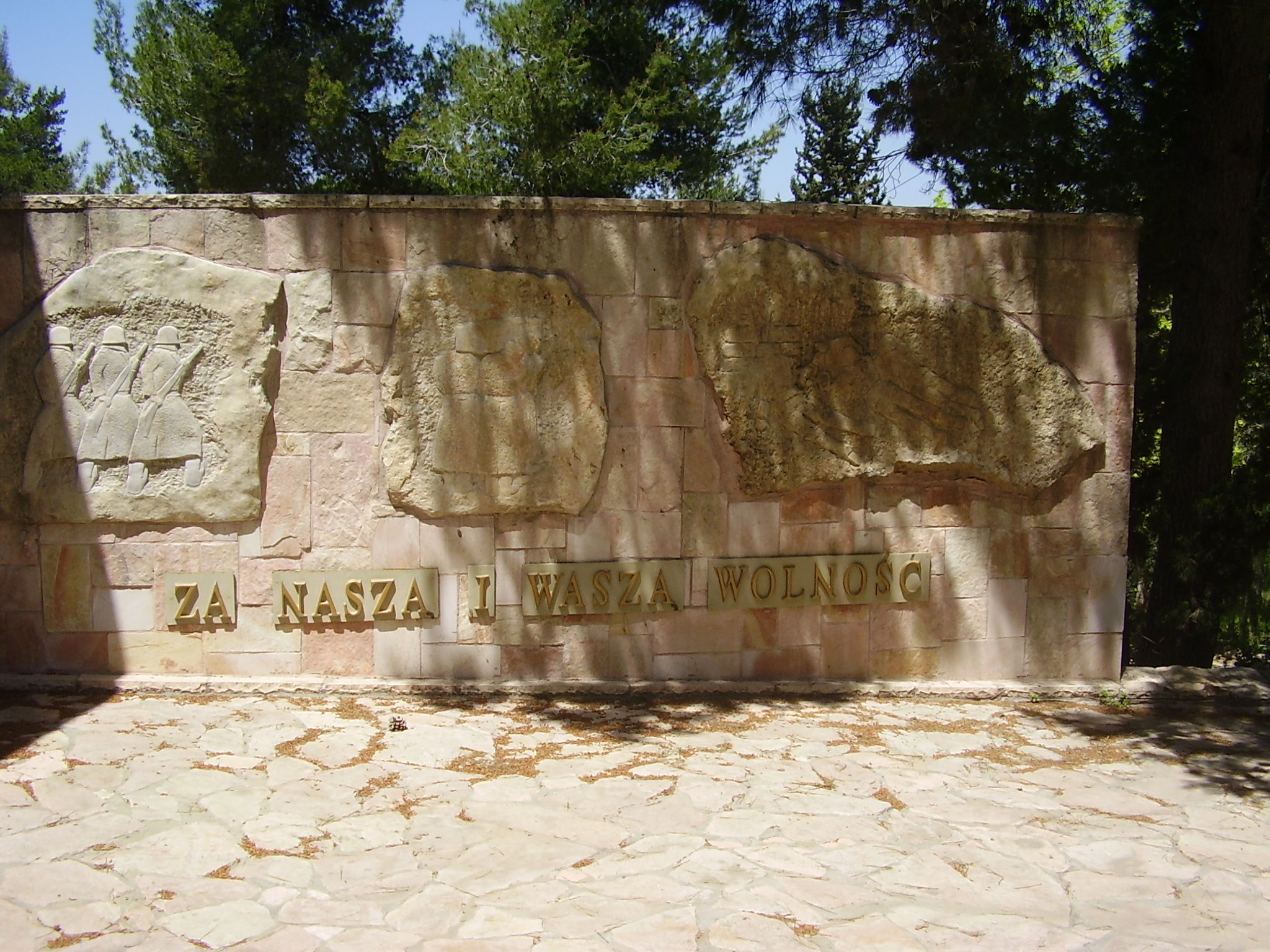
Motto: "For our freedom and yours" from monument in Jerusalem commemorating Jewish soldiers in the Polish Army fighting against Nazi Germany 1939–1945.

For our freedom and yours (Polish: Za naszą i waszą wolność or Za wolność naszą i waszą, Russian: За нашу и вашу свободу) is one of the unofficial mottos of Poland. It is commonly associated with the times when Polish soldiers, exiled from the partitioned Poland, fought in various independence movements all over the world.

The motto was first seen during a patriotic demonstration to commemorate the Decembrists, held in Warsaw on January 25, 1831^{1}, and was most probably authored by Joachim Lelewel. The initial banner has the inscription in both Polish and Russian, and was meant to underline that the victory of Decembrists would also have meant liberty for Poland. The slogan got shorter with time; the original had the form 'In the name of God, for our freedom and yours' (Polish: W imię Boga za Naszą i Waszą Wolność, Russian: Во имя Бога, за нашу и вашу вольность). The original banner has been preserved in the collection of Muzeum Wojska Polskiego in Warsaw.

== 19th century ==
One of the first prominent examples of Poles embodying the slogan and assisting other nations freedom struggles in addition to fighting for Polish causes were Thaddeus Kosciusko and Casimir Pulaski who both fought on the American side in the American War of Independence (1775–1783). Kosciusko later returned to Poland to lead an insurrection against Russia and the partitioning of Poland among Russia, Prussia and Austria. Pulaski had already led an earlier Polish uprising against Russian influence in Poland and died in battle against British troops in Georgia in 1779. The slogan soon became very popular and became among the most commonly seen on military standards during the November Uprising (1830–1831). During the war against Russia, the slogan was to signify that the Polish victory would also mean liberty for the peoples of Russia and that the uprising was aimed not at the Russian nation but at the despotic tsarist regime. Following the failure of the uprising the slogan was used by a variety of Polish military units formed abroad out of refugees. Among them was the unit of Józef Bem, which featured the text in both Polish and Hungarian during the Hungarian Revolution of 1848 and wherever Poles fought during the Spring of Nations.

After unsuccessful Uprising of 1863–1864 in Poland, Lithuania (including what is now Belarus) and Ukraine its active participants were sent by Russian Tsar to Eastern Siberia. Several Poles had developed a conspiracy and then rebelled in June 1866. They had their own banner with the motto written on it.

== World War II era ==
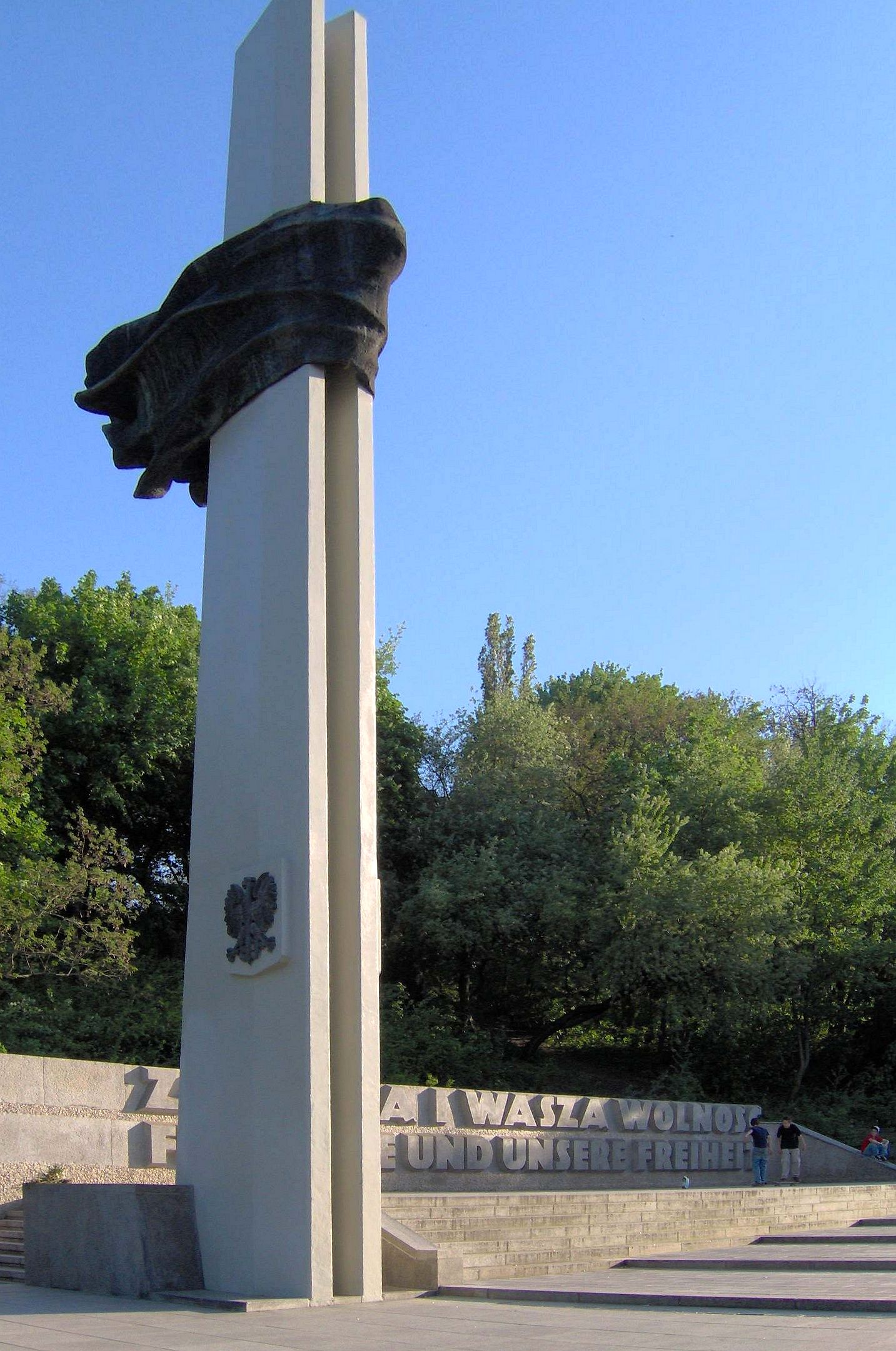
The Memorial to Polish Soldiers and German Anti-Fascists 1939–1945 in Berlin

During the Polish-Soviet War, the motto was used by the Soviet government, which considered itself to be fighting for the rights of Polish workers and peasants against what it saw as the Polish government of landowners and capitalists.

The motto was also used by the Bundists among the members of the Jewish Combat Organisation who led and fought in the Warsaw Ghetto Uprising.

The motto was used by Polish Armed Forces in the West during the fight against Nazi Germany (1939–1945).

== Spain ==
In 1956 the government of the People's Republic of Poland established an award, Za wolność waszą i naszą, for the members of the Polish Brigade in Spain (Dąbrowszczacy), part of the International Brigades, supporting the Republican military units in the Spanish Civil War. The Dabrowszczacy's brigade motto was Za wolność waszą i naszą.

== Motto in Soviet Union and Russia ==
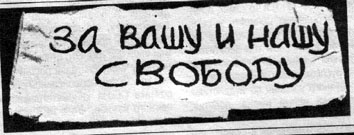
Banner of the Red Square demonstrators, 25 August 1968

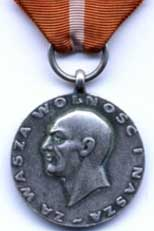
The award 'Za wolność waszą i naszą' (communist general Karol Świerczewski)

The equivalent slogan (Russian: За вашу и нашу свободу Za vashu i nashu svobodu) was very popular among the Soviet dissident movement after the historic demonstration on the Red Square in support of the Prague Spring on August 25, 1968.

The same slogan was used at the demonstration on the Red Square 24 August 2008 and again on August 25, 2013, both suppressed by the Russian police.

== United States ==
The motto was invoked in official speeches, including those of then-President George W. Bush regarding Poland's help in the Iraq War.

== Books ==
The slogan has also been used as a title of various books in the Polish and English languages, for example For your freedom and ours: The Polish Armed Forces in the Second World War (2003), For Your Freedom and Ours: The Kosciuszko Squadron – Forgotten Heroes of World War II (2003) or For Your Freedom and Ours: Casimir Pulaski, 1745–1779 (2004).

== Contemporary usage ==
To this day, Polish foreign policy and diplomacy are guided by a belief that it is Poland's mission to support rights for self-determination, democratic government and a respect for human rights in other countries.

The slogan 'For our freedom and yours' (Lithuanian: Už mūsų ir jūsų laisvę!) was used in Lithuania by representatives of the Sąjūdis movement in the late 1980s and early 1990s which led to the adoption of the Act of the Re-Establishment of the State of Lithuania in 1990 and this way ended the Soviet occupation of Lithuania. In 2019, the slogan was used by Lithuanians and Poles during the reburial ceremony of the participants of the January Uprising in Vilnius. The Lithuanians continued to use the slogan to support Ukraine in its war with Russia.

In the context of the wider influence of Romanticism on Polish hip hop, the phrase has been linked to lyrics composed by the rapper Peja. The slogan has also been used as a metaphor for understanding the spread of contemporary graffiti within Poland after the fall of the Berlin Wall.

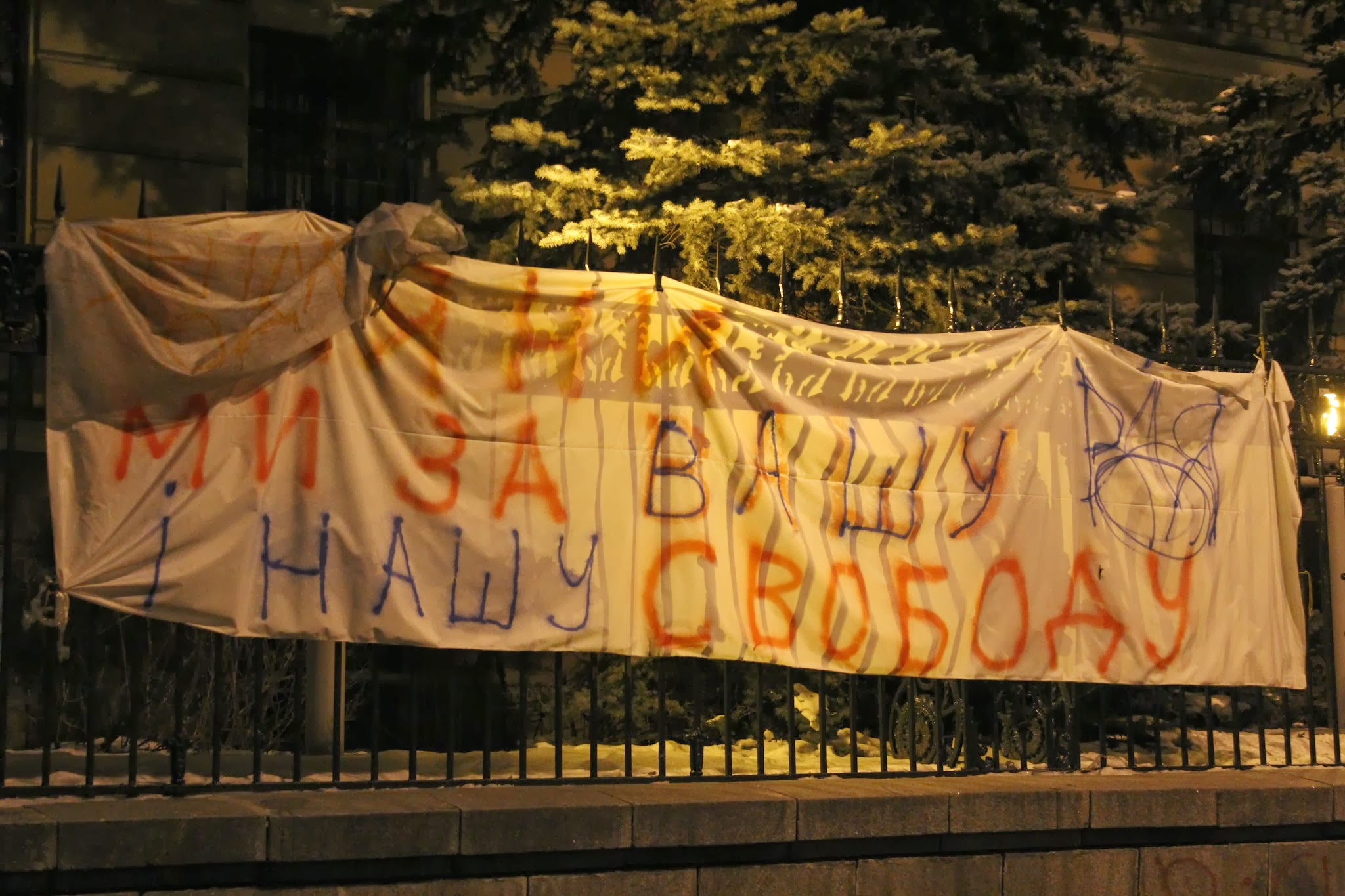
A banner during Euromaidan displaying the Cyrillic version of the phrase За вашу і нашу свободу.

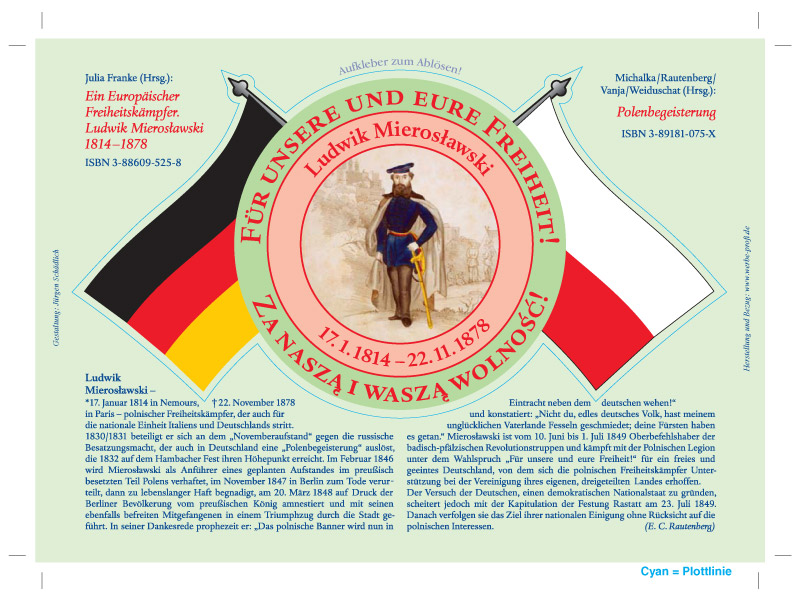
A bumper sticker displaying the phrase in German, Für unsere und eure Freiheit!, and Polish around the figure of Ludwik Mierosławski.

== See also ==
- Polish Legions (disambiguation)
- Pro Fide, Lege et Rege
- Bóg, Honor, Ojczyzna

== Notes ==
1. Several sources (for example, Witness to Hope: The Biography of Pope John Paul II, "Historical Perspectives on Kosciuszko", "Spotkanie marszałka z delegacją "Ancient and Honorable Artillery Company of Massachusetts"" (in Polish)) state that the slogan dates from the late 18th century and was used by Tadeusz Kościuszko, presumably during the Kościuszko Uprising. This is most likely an error based on associating the 1831 motto which became popular with Polish revolutionaries with one of the earliest and most famous of them all. Karma Nabulsi offers a possible explanation: Kościuszko has used the words "For [both] our freedom and yours" ("Za naszą wolność i waszą"), Lelewel reworded them into "For your freedom and ours", a variant which became more popular and is often mixed up with its predecessor.
