= Natalya Gorbanevskaya =

Russian poet, translator and civil rights activist

Natalya Yevgenyevna Gorbanevskaya
- Наталья Евгеньевна Горбаневская
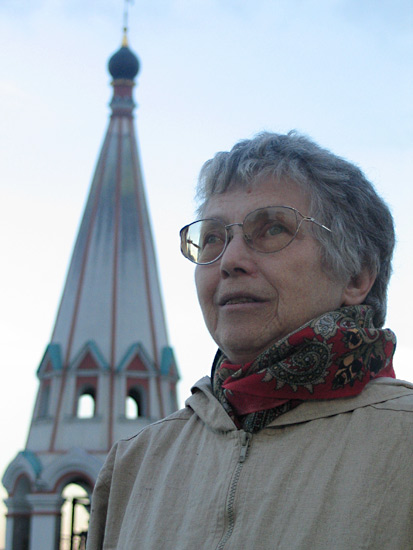
- Gorbanevskaya at the balcony of the library "Russian abroad" (Русское Зарубежье), Moscow, 19 September 2005
- Born: 26 May 1936; Moscow, Soviet Union
- Died: 29 November 2013 (aged 77); Paris, France
- Citizenship: Soviet Union (formerly) and Poland
- Education: Leningrad University
- Occupations: Russian poet, translator of Polish literature, civil rights activist
- Known for: her participation in Soviet dissident movement, the 1968 Red Square demonstration, the editing of A Chronicle of Current Events and struggle against political abuse of psychiatry in the Soviet Union
- Movement: the dissident movement in the Soviet Union
- Gorbanevskaya's voice from Gorbanevskaya's interview for Ekho Moskvy, 21 June 2011

Natalya Yevgenyevna Gorbanevskaya (Russian: Ната́лья Евге́ньевна Горбане́вская, IPA: [nɐˈtalʲjə jɪvˈɡʲenʲjɪvnə ɡərbɐˈnʲefskəjə]; 26 May 1936 – 29 November 2013) was a Russian poet, a translator of Polish literature and a civil-rights activist. She was one of the founders and the first editor of A Chronicle of Current Events (1968–1982). On 25 August 1968, with seven others, she took part in the 1968 Red Square demonstration against the Soviet invasion of Czechoslovakia. In 1970 a Soviet court sentenced Gorbanevskaya to incarceration in a psychiatric hospital. She was released from the Kazan Special Psychiatric Hospital in 1972, and emigrated from the USSR in 1975, settling in France. In 2005, she became a citizen of Poland.

== Life in Moscow ==
Gorbanevskaya was born in Moscow. She graduated from Leningrad University in 1964 and became a technical editor and translator. Only nine of her poems had been published in official journals by the time she quit the USSR in 1975; the rest circulated privately (samizdat) or were published abroad (tamizdat).

== Dissident activities ==
From 1968 onwards Gorbanevskaya was active in what was later called the Soviet "dissident movement."

She was founder and first editor of A Chronicle of Current Events, a samizdat publication that focused on the violation of basic human rights in the Soviet Union. Her contribution was to compile and edit the reports, and then type the first six carbon copies of the issue, the "zero-generation" copy, for further replication and distribution.

Gorbanevskaya was also one of eight protesters in the 25 August 1968 Red Square demonstration against the Soviet invasion of Czechoslovakia. Having recently given birth, she was not immediately tried with the other demonstrators. She used this time to follow the trial in the Chronicle of Current Events, and published the accumulated documentation abroad in French and Russian (Polden). The book appeared in English in 1972 as Red Square at Noon.

In 1969, she signed An Appeal to The UN Committee for Human Rights.

In December 1969 Gorbanevskaya was arrested. In July of the following year she was put on trial and found guilty of offences under Article 190-1 of the RSFSR Criminal Code, committed while of unsound mind. Gorbanevskaya was sentenced to indefinite confinement in a psychiatric hospital where she would be treated for "sluggish schizophrenia", a diagnosis commonly applied to dissidents. Gorbanevskaya was released from the Kazan Special Psychiatric Hospital in February 1972.

== Life in emigration ==
In December 1975, Gorbanevskaya emigrated to Paris. They concluded that in 1969–72 she had been committed to a psychiatric hospital for political, not medical reasons. There, French psychiatrists at their request examined Gorbanevskaya and found her to be mentally normal.

For a time Gorbanevskaya was a celebrity figure in the West. In 1976 Joan Baez released a song dedicated to Gorbanevskaya called "Natalia", written by Roy Apps, Shusha Guppy and G.T. Moore, on the live album From Every Stage. Introducing the song, Baez criticized Gorbanevskaya's internment in the psychiatric hospital and said: "It is because of people like Natalya Gorbanevskaya, I am convinced, that you and I are still alive and walking around on the face of the earth."

Adrienne Rich also wrote "For a Sister," from the book Diving into the Wreck: Poems 1971–1972, in acknowledgement of Gorbanevskaya and other women and their wrongful imprisonment.

For thirty years, however, Gorbanevskaya was stateless until Poland granted her citizenship in 2005.

In 2005 Gorbanevskaya took part in They Chose Freedom, a four-part television documentary on the history of the Soviet dissident movement directed by Vladimir Kara-Murza Jr.

In 2008, she was a signatory of the Prague Declaration on European Conscience and Communism.

=== Commemoration rally on Red Square, 2013 ===
In August 2013, on the 45th anniversary of her arrest in Red Square, Ms. Gorbanevskaya returned there with nine other demonstrators to commemorate the protest. They were arrested on charges of holding an unsanctioned rally.

== Death ==
On 29 November 2013, Gorbanevskaya died in her house in Paris.

== Awards ==
In 2008, October, Gorbanevskaya received Poland's Marie Curie Award. The same year, Gorbanevskaya was nominated for the Angelus Central European Literature Award.

On 22 October 2013 Gorbanevskaya received an honorary medal from Charles University in Prague for her lifelong commitment to the struggle for democracy, freedom and human rights.

On 27 October 2014 Gorbanevskaya was awarded posthumously the highest Slovak award, the Order of the White Double Cross, for her lifelong efforts to defend democracy and human rights.

== Books and other publications ==
- Gorbanevskaya, Nathalia (November 1968). "Lettre de Moscou" [Letter from Moscow]. Esprit (in French). 375 (11): 509–510. JSTOR 24259381.
- Gorbanevskaya, Natalya (1970). Midi Place Rouge. Dossier de la manifestation du 25 août 1968 sur la Place Rouge [The Red Square at Noon: The case on the demonstration of 25 August 1968 at the Red Square] (in French). Paris: Robert Laffont. ASIN B003OS1I6A.
- Gorbanevskaya, Natalia [Наталья Горбаневская] (1970). Полдень: Дело о демонстрации 25 августа 1968 года на Красной площади [Noon: The case on the demonstration of 25 August 1968 at the Red Square] (in Russian). Frankfurt-on-Main: Посев [Seeding].
- Gorbanevskaya, Natalya (1972). Red Square at Noon. London: Andre Deutsch. ISBN 978-0233955179.
- Gorbanevskaya, Natalya (1972). Poems. Manchester: Carcanet Press. ISBN 978-0-85635-002-3.
- Gorbanevskaya, Natalya (March 1972). "Fourteen poems". Index on Censorship. 1 (1): 107–116. doi:10.1080/03064227208532158. S2CID 220926995.
- Gorbanevskaya, Natalya; Tjalsma, H. W. (Autumn 1975). "What grief". The Massachusetts Review. 16 (4): 625. JSTOR 25088584.
- Gorbanevskaya, Natalya (Autumn 1975). "Recollection". The Massachusetts Review. 16 (4): 626. JSTOR 25088585.
- Gorbanevskaya, Natalya (January 1977). "Twelve poems". Index on Censorship. 6 (1): 37–40. doi:10.1080/03064227708532601. S2CID 220947830.
- Gorbanevskaya, Natalya (January 1977). "Writing for 'samizdat'". Index on Censorship. 6 (1): 29–36. doi:10.1080/03064227708532600.
- Gorbanevskaya, Nathalia (1982). "Témoignage" [Testimony]. In Galanskov, Youri (ed.). Le manifeste humain précédé par les témoignages de V. Boukovsky, N. Gorbanevskaïa, A. Guinzbourg, E. Kouznetsov [Human manifesto preceded by testimonies of V. Bukovsky, N. Gorbanevskaya, A. Ginzburg, E. Kuznetsov] (in French). Lausanne: Editions L'Age d'Homme. pp. 32–39. ISBN 978-2825109205.
- Gorbanevskaïa, Natalia (2009). "Samizdat et Internet" [Samizdat and Internet]. Revue Russe (in French). 33 (1): 137–143. doi:10.3406/russe.2009.2393.

== See also ==
- Chronicle of Current Events
- Samizdat
- 1968 Red Square demonstration
