= Lobnoye Mesto =

Stone platform on Red Square in Moscow

Coordinates: 55°45′12″N 37°37′21″E

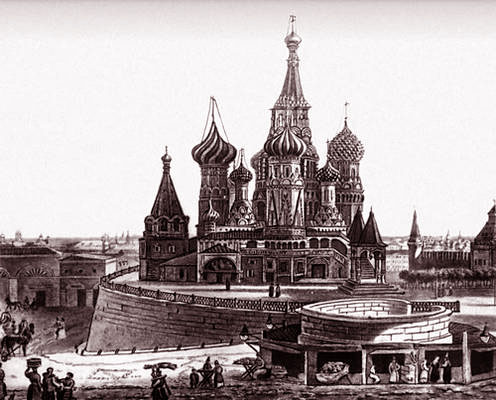
Lobnoye Mesto (foreground, right) in the 18th century

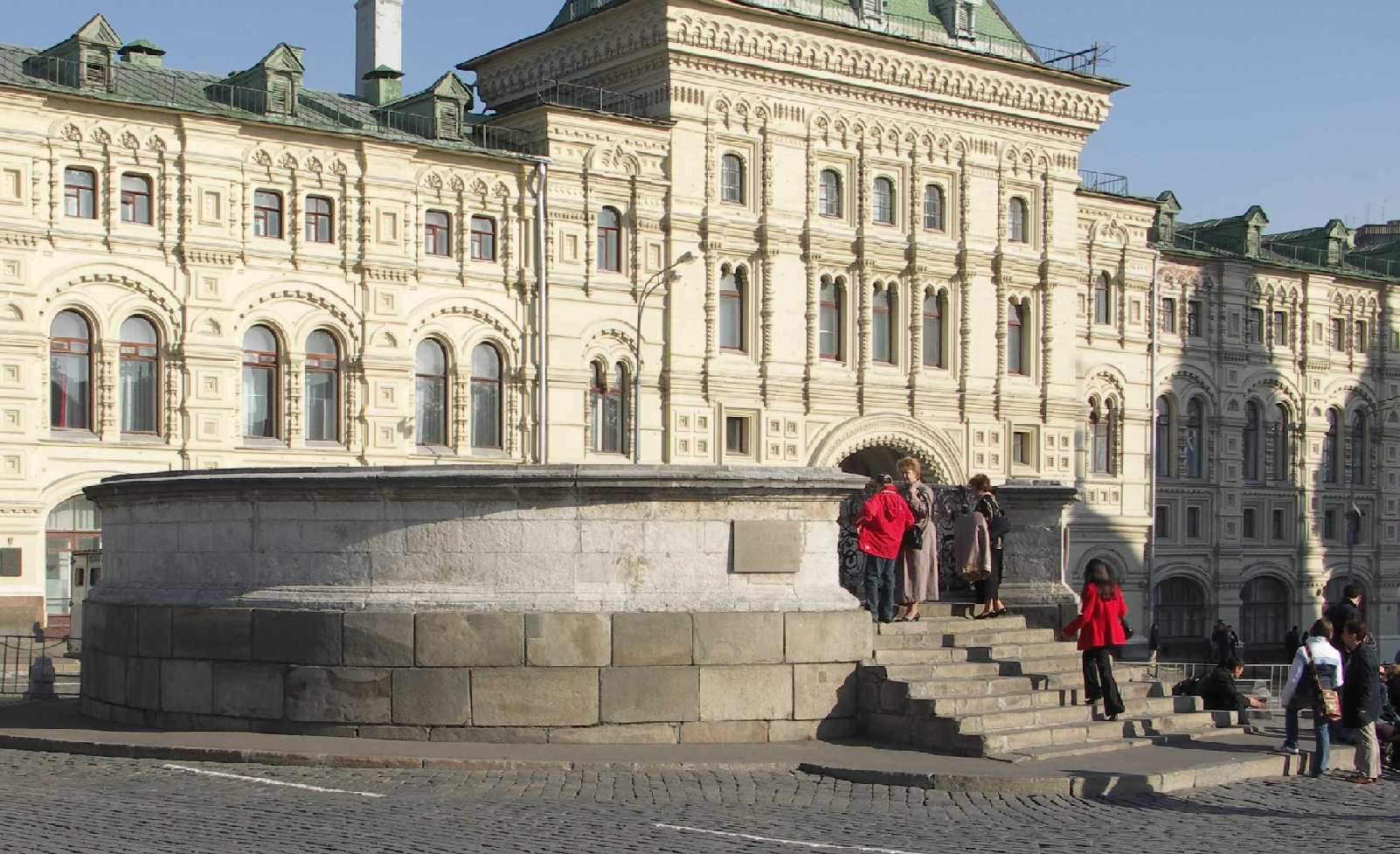
Lobnoye Mesto

Lobnoye mesto (Russian: Лобное место) is a 13-meter-long stone platform situated in the Red Square in Moscow in front of Saint Basil's Cathedral.

Its name is derived from the Russian words for 'forehead' (lob) and 'place' (Mesto). In Old Russian lob meant 'a steep river bank'. The platform, believed to have been constructed in brick in the 1530s, was first mentioned in 1547, when Ivan the Terrible addressed the Muscovites from there. Subsequently, it was primarily used for announcing the tsar's ukazes and for religious ceremonies. Despite a common misconception, the circular platform itself was never a place for executions. Sometimes scaffolds were placed by it, but usually public executions were carried out at Vasilevsky Spusk behind St. Basil's Cathedral.

In the Russian Empire, during Holy Week, the Palm Sunday procession called "donkey walk" would end at the Lobnoye Mesto where a depiction of Calvary had been erected. The Tsar himself, on foot to show humility, would lead the Patriarch of Moscow, who was seated on a donkey, in a procession from the city gates to Red Square.

The nearby Monument to Minin and Pozharsky commemorates the events of 1612, when Prince Pozharsky ascended the Lobnoye Mesto to pronounce Moscow free from Polish occupation. In 1786, the architect Matvei Kazakov had the Lobnoye Mesto rebuilt in white stone while keeping its original location and proportions.

== Location and first mention ==
The place of execution is opposite the Spasskaya Tower near the Intercession Cathedral and is a circular in plan stone pavement 13 m in diameter and 1 m high with a stone parapet. Initially, the Place of execution was made of brick but in 1599, during the reign of Boris Godunov, it was rebuilt in stone and surrounded by a lattice. At the same time, Tsar Cannon was installed nearby on a wooden gun carriage. Images of Tsar Cannon are also documented in the engravings and drawings of seventeenth-century European travellers. The Lobnoye Mesto acquired its present appearance after the restoration of 1786.

== Literature ==
- Khromov, Semen (1981). History of Moscow: An Outline. Moscow: Progress Publishers. p. 376.
