= Collusion (disambiguation) =

Collusion is an agreement, usually secretive, which occurs between two or more persons to deceive, mislead, or defraud others of legal rights. If the agreement is to commit a crime in the future, such collusion may be a criminal conspiracy.

Collusion may also refer to:

- Collusion (EP), a 2005 metalcore album
- Collusion Syndicate, a defunct special interest group
- Collusion (software), later called Lightbeam, an experimental add-on for Firefox and Google Chrome
- Collusion (psychology), a behavioral pattern in relationships

== See also ==
- Collision (disambiguation)
