= Cases of political abuse of psychiatry in the Soviet Union =

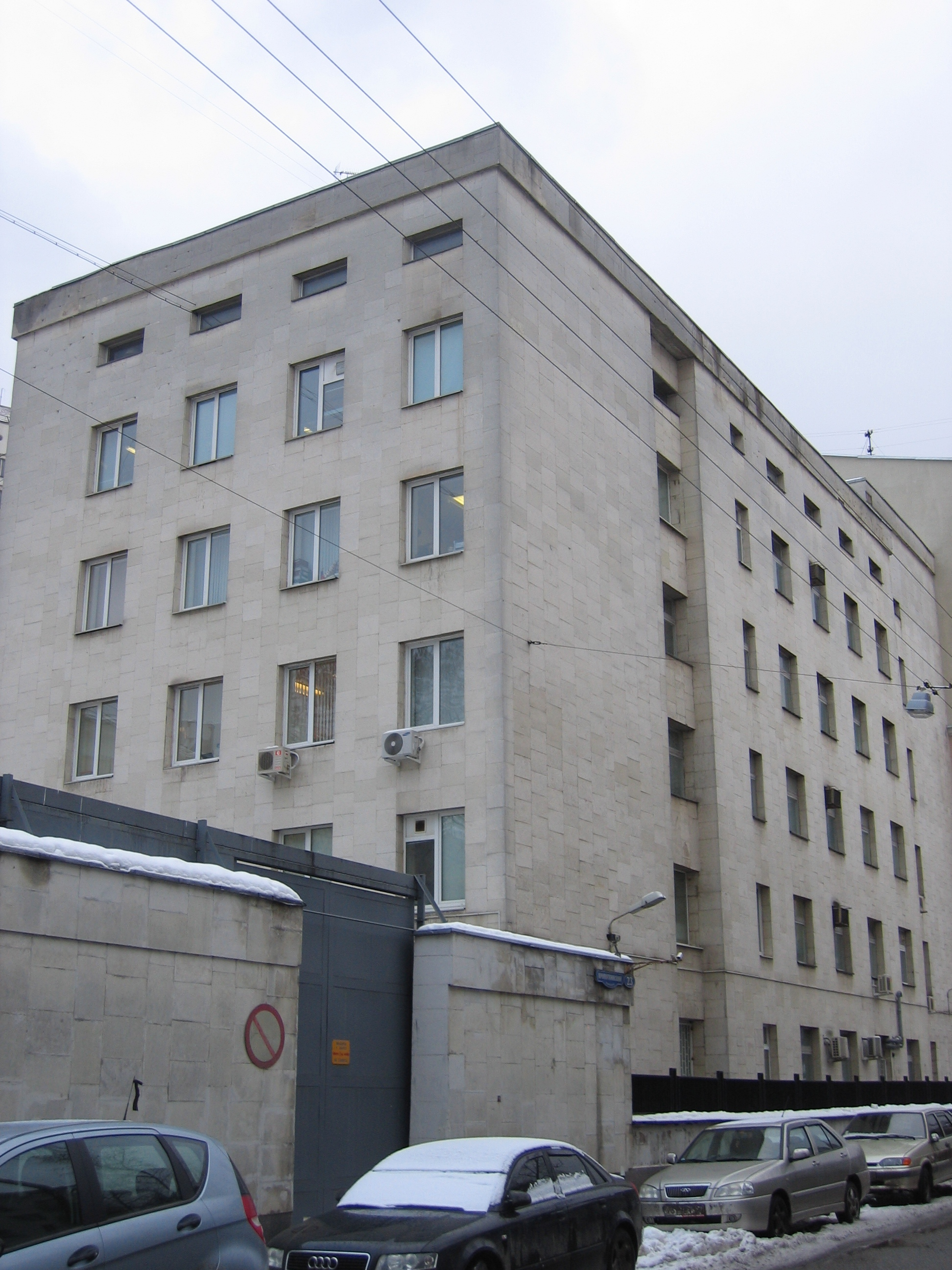
The Serbsky Central Research Institute for Forensic Psychiatry, also briefly called the Serbsky Institute (the part of its building in Moscow)

In the Soviet Union, a systematic political abuse of psychiatry took place and was based on the interpretation of political dissent as a psychiatric problem. It was called "psychopathological mechanisms" of dissent.

During the leadership of General Secretary Leonid Brezhnev, psychiatry was used as a tool to eliminate political opponents ("dissidents") who openly expressed beliefs that contradicted official dogma. The term "philosophical intoxication" was widely used to diagnose mental disorders in cases where people disagreed with leaders and made them the target of criticism that used the writings by Karl Marx, Friedrich Engels, and Vladimir Lenin. Article 58-10 of the Stalin Criminal Code—which as Article 70 had been shifted into the RSFSR Criminal Code of 1962—and Article 190-1 of the RSFSR Criminal Code along with the system of diagnosing mental illness, developed by academician Andrei Snezhnevsky, created the very preconditions under which non-standard beliefs could easily be transformed into a criminal case, and it, in its turn, into a psychiatric diagnosis. Anti-Soviet political behavior, in particular, being outspoken in opposition to the authorities, demonstrating for reform, writing books were defined in some persons as being simultaneously a criminal act (e.g., violation of Articles 70 or 190–1), a symptom (e.g., "delusion of reformism"), and a diagnosis (e.g., "sluggish schizophrenia"). Within the boundaries of the diagnostic category, the symptoms of pessimism, poor social adaptation and conflict with authorities were themselves sufficient for a formal diagnosis of "sluggish schizophrenia."

The process of psychiatric incarceration was instigated by attempts to emigrate; distribution or possession of prohibited documents or books; participation in civil rights actions and demonstrations, and involvement in forbidden religious activity. The religious faith of prisoners, including well-educated former atheists who adopted a religion, was determined to be a form of mental illness that needed to be cured. The KGB routinely sent dissenters to psychiatrists for diagnosing to avoid embarrassing public trials and to discredit dissidence as the product of ill minds. Formerly highly classified government documents published after the dissolution of the Soviet Union demonstrate that the authorities used psychiatry as a tool to suppress dissent.

According to the Commentary on the Russian Federation Law on Psychiatric Care, persons who were subjected to repressions in the form of commitment for compulsory treatment to psychiatric medical institutions and were rehabilitated in accordance with the established procedure receive compensation. The Russian Federation acknowledged that psychiatry was used for political purposes and took responsibility for the victims of "political psychiatry."

Political abuse of psychiatry in Russia continues after the fall of the Soviet Union and threatens human rights activists with a psychiatric diagnosis.

== Background ==
Political abuse of psychiatry is the misuse of psychiatric diagnosis, detention and treatment for the purposes of obstructing the fundamental human rights of certain groups and individuals in a society. It entails the exculpation and committal of citizens to psychiatric facilities based upon political rather than mental health-based criteria. Many authors, including psychiatrists, also use the terms "Soviet political psychiatry" or "punitive psychiatry" to refer to this phenomenon.

In the book Punitive Medicine by Alexander Podrabinek, the term "punitive medicine", which is identified with "punitive psychiatry," is defined as "a tool in the struggle against dissidents who cannot be punished by legal means." Punitive psychiatry is neither a discrete subject nor a psychiatric specialty but, rather, it is an emergency arising within many applied sciences in totalitarian countries where members of a profession may feel themselves compelled to service the diktats of power. Psychiatric confinement of sane people is uniformly considered a particularly pernicious form of repression and Soviet punitive psychiatry was one of the key weapons of both illegal and legal repression.

As Vladimir Bukovsky and Semyon Gluzman wrote in their joint A Manual on Psychiatry for Dissenters, "the Soviet use of psychiatry as a punitive means is based upon the deliberate interpretation of dissent… as a psychiatric problem." This work was published in Russian, English, French, Italian, German and Danish.

Psychiatry possesses an inherent capacity for abuse that is greater than in other areas of medicine. The diagnosis of mental disease can give the state license to detain persons against their will and insist upon therapy both in the interest of the detainee and in the broader interests of society. In addition, receiving a psychiatric diagnosis can in itself be regarded as oppressive. In a monolithic state, psychiatry can be used to bypass standard legal procedures for establishing guilt or innocence and allow political incarceration without the ordinary odium attaching to such political trials. In the period from the 1960s to 1986, the abuse of psychiatry for political purposes was reported to have been systematic in the Soviet Union and episodic in other Eastern European countries such as Romania, Hungary, Czechoslovakia, and Yugoslavia. The practice of incarceration of political dissidents in mental hospitals in Eastern Europe and the former USSR damaged the credibility of psychiatric practice in these states and entailed strong condemnation from the international community. Psychiatrists have been involved in human rights abuses in states across the world when the definitions of mental disease were expanded to include political disobedience. As scholars have long argued, governmental and medical institutions have at times coded threats to authority as mental disease during periods of political disturbance and instability. Nowadays, in many countries, political prisoners are still sometimes confined and abused in mental institutions.

In the Soviet Union dissidents were often confined in the so-called psikhushka, or psychiatric wards. Psikhushka is the Russian ironic diminutive for "mental hospital". One of the first psikhushkas was the Psychiatric Prison Hospital in the city of Kazan. In 1939 it was transferred to the control of the NKVD, the secret police and the precursor organization to the KGB, under the order of Lavrentiy Beria, who was the head of the NKVD. International human rights defenders such as Walter Reich have long recorded the methods by which Soviet psychiatrists in Psikhushka hospitals diagnosed schizophrenia in political dissenters. Western scholars examined no aspect of Soviet psychiatry as thoroughly as its involvement in the social control of political dissenters.

== Individual cases ==
=== Sergei Pisarev ===
Cases of political abuse of psychiatry have been known since the 1940s and 1950s. One of these early cases was that of party official Sergei Pisarev. Pisarev was arrested after criticizing the work of the Soviet secret police in the context of the so-called Doctors' Plot, an anti-Semitic campaign waged at Stalin's instructions that should have brought about a new terror wave in the Soviet Union and possibly the extermination of the remaining Jewish communes that had outlived the Second World War. Pisarev was committed to the Special Psychiatric Hospital in Leningrad which along with an analogous hospital in Sychevka has started functioning since the Second World War. After his discharge, Pisarev began a campaign against political abuse of psychiatry, concentrating on the Serbsky Institute which he viewed to be the seat of the trouble. As a consequence of his efforts, the Central Committee of the Communist Party formed a committee which investigated the situation and came to the conclusion that political abuse of psychiatry was actually taking place. The report, however, vanished in a desk drawer and never brought about any action.

=== Pyotr Grigorenko ===
In 1961, Soviet general Pyotr Grigorenko started to openly criticize what he considered the excesses of the Khrushchev regime. He maintained that the special privileges of the political elite did not comply with the principles laid down by Lenin. Grigorenko formed a dissident group — The Group for the Struggle to Revive Leninism. Soviet psychiatrists from commissions instituted to inquire into his sanity diagnosed him at least three times — in April 1964, August 1969, and November 1969. When arrested, Grigorenko was sent to Moscow's Lubyanka prison, and from there for psychiatric examination to the Serbsky Institute where the first commission, which included Snezhnevsky and Lunts, diagnosed him with the mental disease in the form of a paranoid delusional development of his personality, accompanied by early signs of cerebral arteriosclerosis. Lunts, reporting later on this diagnosis, mentioned that the symptoms of paranoid development were "an overestimation of his own personality reaching messianic proportions" and "reformist ideas." Grigorenko was irresponsible for his actions and was thereby forcibly committed to a special psychiatric hospital. While there, the government deprived him of his pension despite the fact that, by law, a mentally sick military officer was entitled to a pension. After six months, Grigorenko was found to be in remission and was released for outpatient follow-up. He required that his pension be restored. Although he began to draw pension again, it was severely cut. He became much more active in his dissidence, stirred other people to protest some of the State's actions and received several warnings from the KGB. As Grigorenko had followers in Moscow, he was lured to Tashkent, half a continent away. Again he was arrested and examined by psychiatric team. None of the manifestations or symptoms cited by the Lunts commission were found by the second commission held in Tashkent under the chairmanship of Fyodor Detengof. The diagnosis and evaluation made by the commission was that "Grigorenko's [criminal] activity had a purposeful character, it was related to concrete events and facts... It did not reveal any signs of illness or delusions." The psychiatrists reported that he was not mentally sick, but responsible for his actions. He had firm convictions which were shared by many of his colleagues and were not delusional. Having evaluated the records of his preceding hospitalization, they concluded that he had not been sick at that time either. The KGB brought Grigorenko back in Moscow and, three months later, arranged a second examination at the Serbsky Institute. Once again, these psychiatrists found that he had "a paranoid development of the personality" manifested by reformist ideas. The commission, which included Lunts and was chaired by Morozov, recommended that he be recommitted to a special psychiatric hospital for the socially dangerous. Eventually, after almost four years, he was transferred to a usual mental hospital.

In 1971, Dr. Semyon Gluzman wrote a psychiatric report on Grigorenko. Gluzman came to the conclusion that Grigorenko was mentally sane and had been taken to mental hospitals for political reasons. In the late 1970s and early 1980s, Gluzman was forced to serve seven years in labor camp and three years in Siberian exile for refusing to diagnose Grigorenko with a mental illness.

Andrew, Grigorenko's son, was declared a hereditary madman in 1975 and was expelled from the USSR to the USA where he lives now. Andrew was repeatedly told that since his father was mentally ill, then he was hereditarily mentally ill as well, and if he would not stop his appearances in defense of human rights and his father, he was told to go to psikhushka.

In 1979 in New York, Grigorenko was examined by the team of psychologists and psychiatrists including Alan A. Stone, the then President of American Psychiatric Association. The team came to the conclusion that they could find no evidence of mental disease in Grigorenko and his history consistent with mental disease in the past. The conclusion was drawn up by Walter Reich. Stone said Grigorenko's case confirms some of the accusations that psychiatry in the Soviet Union is sometimes employed as a tool of political repression. In 1981, Pyotr Grigorenko told about his psychiatric examinations and hospitalizations in his memoirs V Podpolye Mozhno Vstretit Tolko Krys (In The Underground One Can Meet Only Rats) translated into English under the title Memoirs in 1982. In 1991, a commission, composed of psychiatrists from all over the Soviet Union and led by Modest Kabanov, director of the Bekhterev Psychoneurological Institute in St Petersburg, spent six months reviewing the Grigorenko files, drew up 29 thick volumes of legal proceedings, and reversed the official diagnosis on Grigorenko in October 1991. In 1992, the official post-mortem forensic psychiatric commission of experts met at Grigorenko's homeland removed the stigma of mental patient from him and confirmed that the debilitating treatment he underwent in high security psychiatric hospitals for many years was groundless. The 1992 psychiatric examination of Grigorenko was described by the Nezavisimiy Psikhiatricheskiy Zhurnal in its numbers 1–4 of 1992.

=== Viktor Rafalsky ===
Viktor Rafalsky, a political prisoner, dissident and author of unpublished plays, novels, and short stories, was committed to Soviet psychiatric prisons in Lviv, Dnipropetrovsk, and Leningrad for 24 years because of belonging to a clandestine Marxist group (from 1954 to 1959), writing anti-Soviet prose (from 1962 to 1965), and possessing anti-Soviet literature (from 1968 to 1983). In the winter of 1987, he was discharged and pronounced sane. In 1988, Viktor Rafalsky published the first version of his memoirs Reportazh iz Niotkuda (Reportage from Nowhere) describing his confinement in Soviet psychiatric hospitals. In his memoirs, he writes, "I will say plain: when I got into a prison (it happened quite often), I, whether you believe or not, had a rest. So what was a prison in comparison with the horror of prison psikhushkas?!" Some pages below, he adds, "In a prison, you can read, write, lastly do something to kill time. In prison psikhushkas, you have the right only to look at the ceiling: it is forbidden to keep paper, pencils, and even a book."

=== Joseph Brodsky ===
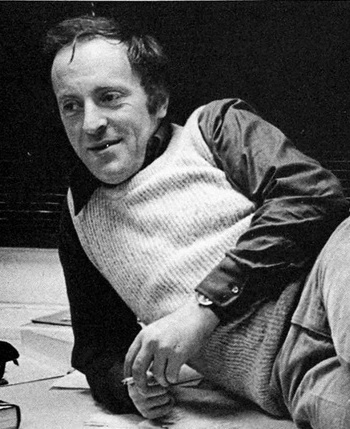
Joseph Brodsky (1940–1996), a Russian poet, American essayist, and the 1987 Nobel laureate in Literature

At the very end of 1963, the poet Joseph Brodsky was committed for observation to the Kashchenko psychiatric clinic in Moscow where he stayed for several days. A few weeks later, his second hospitalization took place: on 13 February he was arrested in Leningrad. Brought to trial for "pursuing a parasitic way of life", Brodsky was accused of being a poet and of not doing more "productive" work. There were two hearings of the trial dated 18 February and 13 March 1964. The judge ordered to send him "for an official psychiatric examination during which it will be determined whether Brodsky is suffering from some sort of psychological illness or not and whether this illness will prevent Brodsky from being sent to a distant locality for forced labor. Taking into consideration that from the history of his illness it is apparent that Brodsky has evaded hospitalization, it is hereby ordered that division No. 18 of the militia be in charge of bringing him to the official psychiatric examination." On 18 February, the Dzerzhinsky District Court sent Brodsky for psychiatric examination to "Pryazhka," Psychiatric Hospital No. 2 where he spent about three weeks, from 18 February to 13 March. In the mental hospitals, Brodsky was given "tranquilizing" injections, wakened in the middle of the night, immersed into a cold bath, wrapped in a wet sheet, and put next to the heater so that the sheet would cut into his body when it dried. These two stints at psychiatric establishments formed the experience underlying Gorbunov and Gorchakov written and called by Brodsky "an extremely serious work." In 1972, when the authorities considered Brodsky for exile and sought an expert opinion on his mental health, they consulted Snezhnevsky who, without examining him personally, diagnosed him with schizophrenia and concluded that he was "not a valuable person at all and may be let go."

=== Valery Tarsis ===
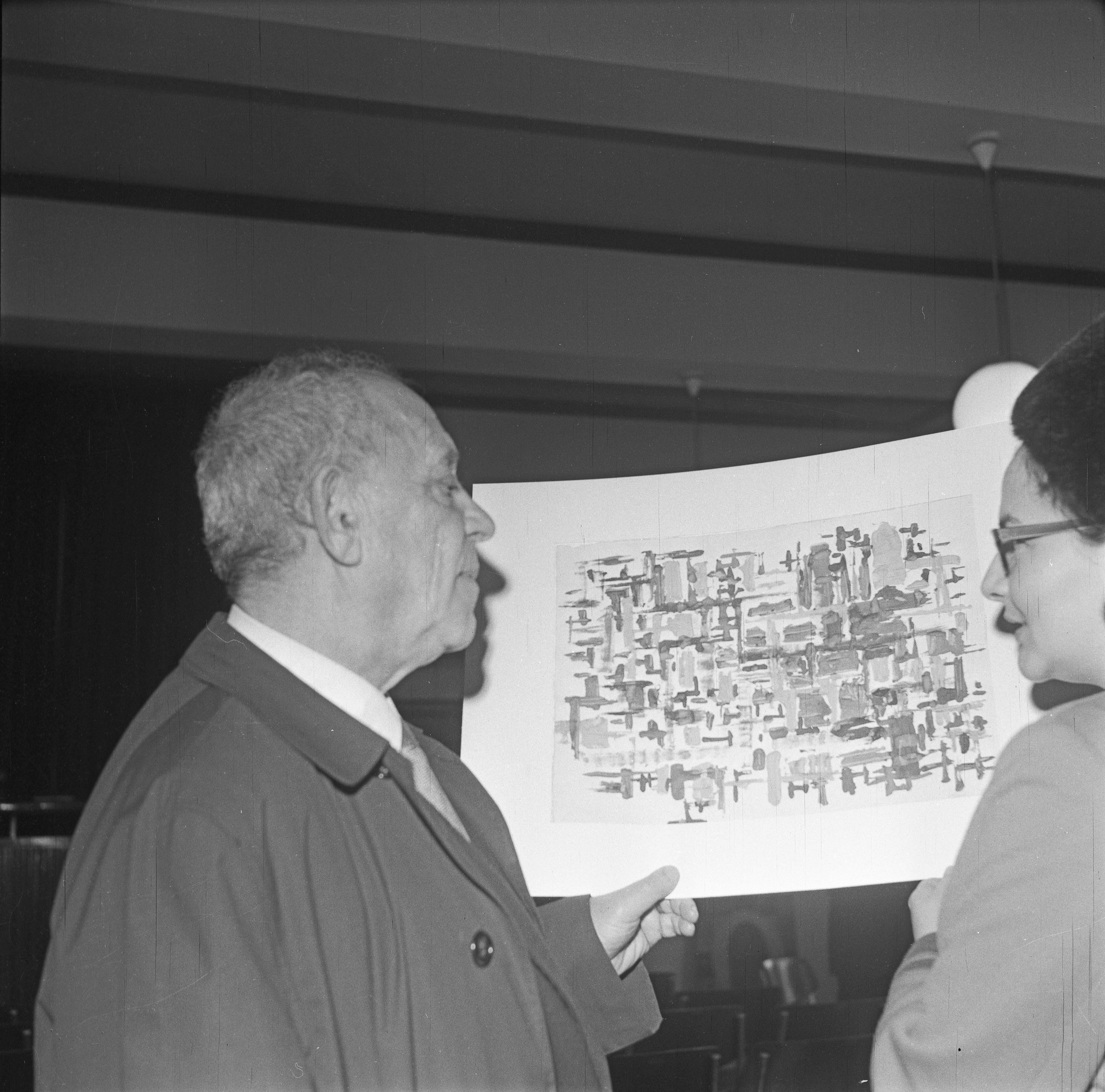
Valery Tarsis (1906–1983), a Russian writer and political prisoner

In 1965 in the West, strong public awareness that Soviet psychiatry could be subject to political abuse arose with publication of the book Ward 7 by Valery Tarsis, a writer born in 1906 in Kiev. He based the book upon his own experiences in 1963–1964 when he was detained in the Moscow Kashchenko psychiatric hospital for political reasons.

The fictionalised documentary Ward No. 7 by Tarsis was the first literary work to deal with the Soviet authorities' abuse of psychiatry. In a parallel with the story Ward No. 6 by Anton Chekhov, Tarsis implies that it is the doctors who are mad, whereas the patients are completely sane, although unsuited to a life of slavery. Individuals in ward No. 7 are not cured, but persistently maimed; the hospital is a jail and the doctors are gaolers and police spies. Most doctors know nothing about psychiatry, but make diagnoses arbitrarily and give all patients the same medication — an algogenic injection or the anti-psychotic drug Aminazin known in the USA under trade name Thorazine. Tarsis denounces Soviet psychiatry as pseudo-science and charlatanism and writes that, firstly, it has pretenses of curing the sickness of men's souls, but denies the existence of the soul; secondly, since there is no satisfactory definition of mental health, there can be no acceptable definition of mental disease in Soviet society.

In 1966, Tarsis was permitted to emigrate to the West, and was soon deprived of his Soviet citizenship. The KGB had plans to compromise the literary career of Tarsis abroad through labelling him as a mentally ill person. As the 1966 memorandum to the Politburo of the Central Committee of the Communist Party of the Soviet Union reported, "KGB continues arrangements for further compromising Tarsis abroad as a mentally ill person." Among all the victims of Soviet psychiatry, Tarsis was the sole exception in the sense that he did not emphasize the 'injustice' of confining 'sane dissidents' to psychiatric hospitals and did not thereby imply that the psychiatric confinement of 'insane patients' was proper and just.

=== Evgeni Belov ===
Shortly after publishing Ward 7, a second case of political abuse of psychiatry gave rise to attention in Great Britain. Evgeni Belov, a young Moscow interpreter contracted by a group of four British students, made friends with them. At first he was positive about Soviet system, but gradually became more critical and began to voice demand for more freedom. Calling for a free press and free trade unions, Belov began to write letters to the Party. As a consequence, his membership in the Party was suspended and he was summoned to appear before a committee. He declined, and instead sought justice higher up by writing protest letters to Leonid Brezhnev himself. When British students returned from a short trip to Tokyo, Belov had vanished. To their shock, it emerged that he had been committed to a mental hospital. A campaign to get him out yielded no results. A British newspaper published a letter in which Belov's father stated that his son was really sick, and the campaign came to a grinding halt. However, the public interest had been activated.

=== Alexander Esenin-Volpin ===
Awareness in the West was also raised by the case of Alexander Esenin-Volpin, a son of the famous Russian poet Sergei Esenin and born in 1924. In 1946, he was first committed to the Leningrad Special Psychiatric Hospital for writing a poem considered anti-Soviet. During Khrushchev's reign, Esenin-Volpin was later hospitalized three times: in 1957, in 1959–1960 in the same the Leningrad Special Psychiatric Hospital and, finally, in 1962–1963. In 1968, Esenin-Volpin was again hospitalized, and for this once his case achieved the attention in the West. In February 1968, 99 Soviet mathematicians and scientists sent a letter to the Soviet officials demanding his release. After a wave of protests, he was discharged and permitted to immigrate to the USA where he obtained the position of professor of mathematics. In 2010, Alexander Magalif, who hospitalized Esenin-Volpin, recollected that he had seen a little mark made by a pencil in the corner of the referral to treatment of Esenin-Volpin: "not to discharge from the hospital without coordination with KGB."

=== Yuli Daniel ===
In 1965, the writer Yuli Daniel was arrested due to his satirical anti-Stalinist works and outspoken protest at the human rights abuse in the USSR. Daniel was kept in a mental hospital of the Gulag where he was refused medical treatment in order to destroy his will.

=== Viktor Fainberg ===
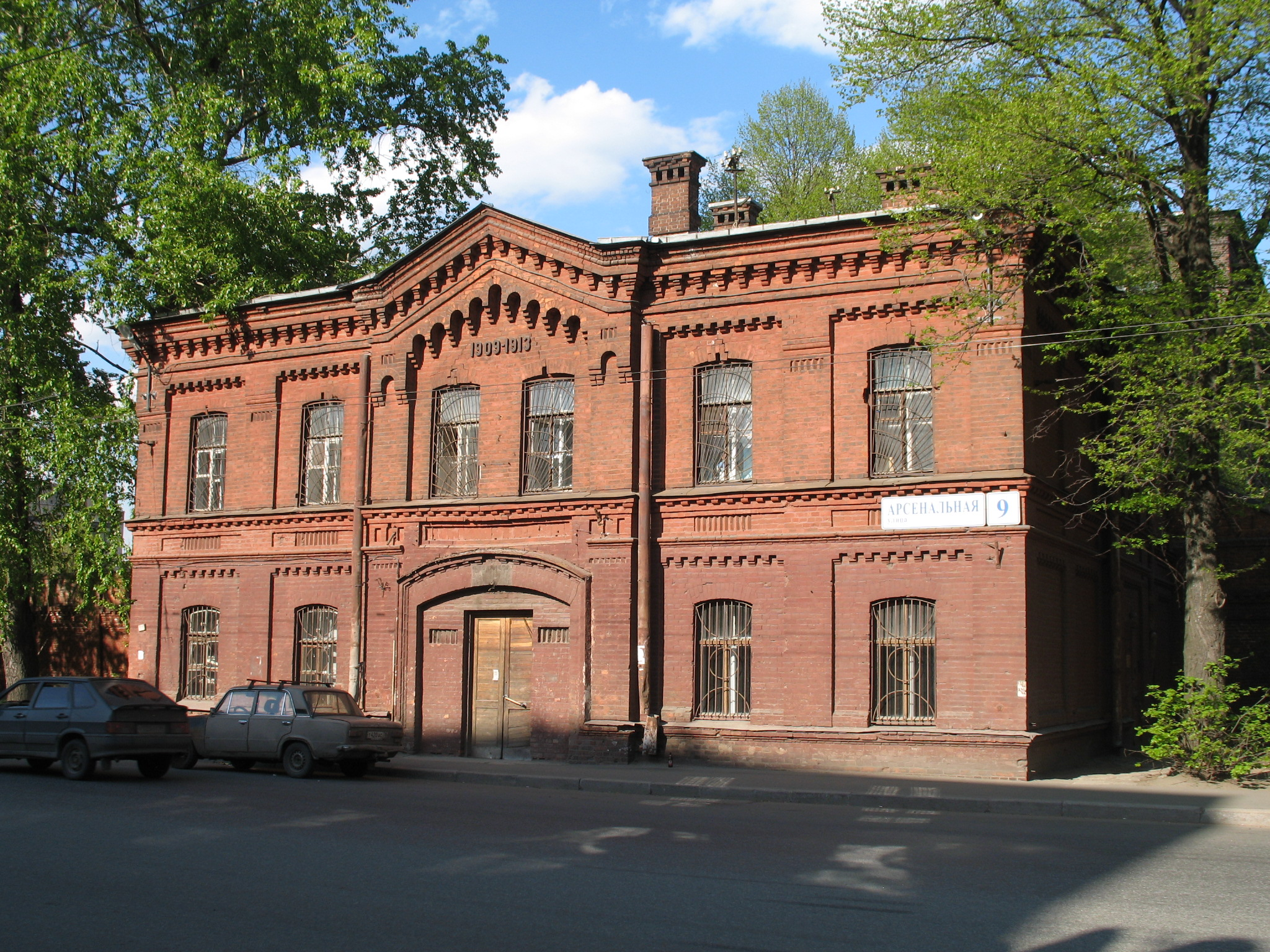
The Leningrad Special Psychiatric Hospital of Prison Type of the USSR Ministry of Internal Affairs where Vladimir Bukovsky, Pyotr Grigorenko, Alexander Yesenin-Volpin and Viktor Fainberg were imprisoned (the St Petersburg Psychiatric Hospital of Specialized Type with Intense Observation at the present time) was one of the Soviet special psychiatric hospitals

Viktor Fainberg was one of the seven participants of the 1968 Red Square demonstration against the Soviet intervention into Czechoslovakia. He was committed for compulsory treatment to the Special Psychiatric Hospital in Leningrad where he was confined for five years. During his confinement, a psychiatrist working in the establishment, Marina Voikhanskaya, fell in love with him and helped him as much as she could. After his discharge, they married and emigrated to the United Kingdom where Fainberg organized the Campaign Against Psychiatric Abuse and was its director. When Fainberg and Voikhanskaya had divorced, Viktor moved to Paris and Marina remained in the United Kingdom.

=== Valeriya Novodvorskaya ===
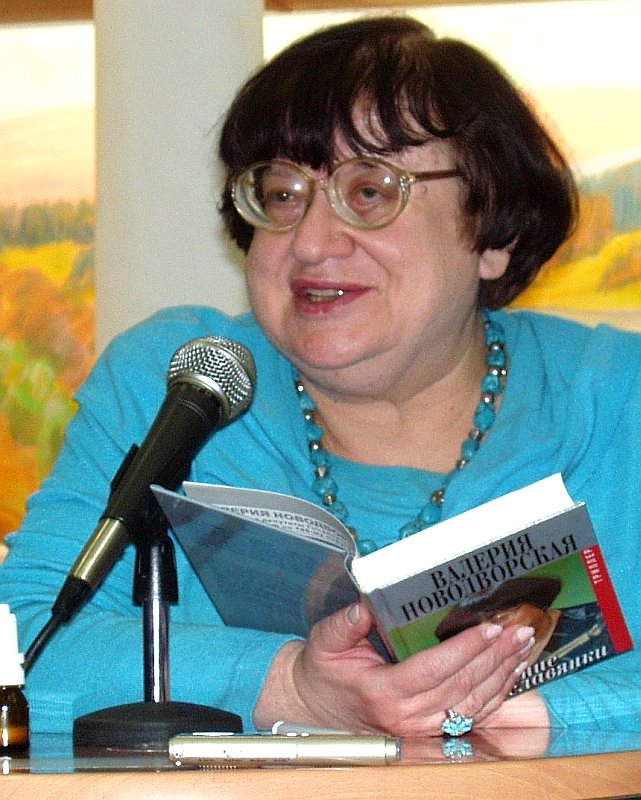
Valeriya Novodvorskaya (1950–2014), a Russian politician and former Soviet human rights activist and political prisoner

In 1968, Valeriya Novodvorskaya created an underground student organization whose purpose was to overthrow the Soviet state. On 5 December 1969, she was arrested in the Kremlin Palace of Congresses, where before the start of a performance of the opera October she was handing out and scattering leaflets written in verse form until she was approached by KGB men. She was later sentenced to indefinite detention in the prison psychiatric hospital in Kazan. Her experience in this hospital was described in her largest collection of writings entitled Po Tu Storonu Otchayaniya (Beyond Despair). Novodvorskaya was also committed in a mental hospital later, in 1978 as a member of the Free Interprofessional Association of Workers and as a person arrested "for insulting President" in September 1990; that time she was discharged after the 1991 putsch. In the early 1990s, psychiatrists of the Independent Psychiatric Association of Russia and G. N. Sotsevich proved the absence of mental illness in Novodvorskaya.

=== Natalya Gorbanevskaya ===
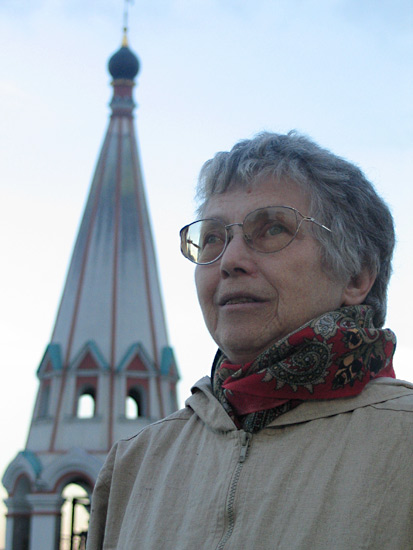
Natalya Gorbanevskaya (1936–2013), a Russian poet and former Soviet human rights activist and political prisoner

After the 1968 Red Square demonstration against the Soviet invasion into Czechoslovakia, August 1968 saw the arrest of Natalya Gorbanevskaya well known in the West due to her book Red Square at Noon describing the demonstration. A few days later, the Serbsky Institute found her non-accountable and made diagnosis of "deep psychopathy—the presence of mild, chronic schizophrenic process cannot be excluded." She was allowed to return to the care of her mother. In November 1969, a psychiatric commission again examined her, diagnosed "psychopathic personality with symptoms of hysteria and a tendency to decompensation", but considered that psychiatric hospitalization was not required. A month later, she was again arrested and sent to the Serbsky Institute for psychiatric examination in April 1970. The investigating commission chaired by Morozov found her non-responsible and that she had a "chronic, mental illness in the form of schizophrenia." The commission found in her the presence of changes in the thinking processes and in the critical and emotional faculties characteristic of schizophrenia. It was concluded that Gorbanevskaya took part in the Red Square demonstration in a state of the mental disease. In Paris, French psychiatrists at their request examined Gorbanevskaya and found her to be mentally normal. They concluded that in 1969–1972 she had been committed to a psychiatric hospital for political, not medical reasons.

=== Zhores Medvedev ===
On 29 May 1970, Zhores Medvedev, an internationally respected and prominent scientist, was forcibly taken from his apartment in Obninsk and committed to a mental hospital where he was held, without legitimate medical justification, until 17 June 1970. The leadership was instantly faced with the action of strong collective protest initiated by top Soviet scientists including Igor Tamm and Pyotr Kapitsa. Medvedev's release was achieved only after intense pressure from intellectuals and scientists both within and outside of the USSR. He was largely hospitalized because of the publication abroad of his book of Trofim Lysenko. In widely circulated books, Zhores Medvedev had criticized the "geneticist" Lysenko and had also expressed his straightforward disagreement with restrictions on communication with scientists abroad. He was removed from his position as head of a laboratory at the Institute of Medical Radiology and this removal was illegal, he said. The diagnosis in the case-notes was "incipient schizophrenia," the diagnosis made by the psychiatric commission was "psychopathic personality with paranoid tendencies." What happened to Medvedev was not a separate incident; rather, it was part, in Medvedev's words, of "the dangerous tendency of using psychiatry for political purposes, the exploitation of medicine in an alien role as a means of intimidation and punishment — a new and illegal way of isolating people for their views and convictions." This experience was reflected in Zhores Medvedev's and Roy Medvedev's book A Question of Madness: Repression by Psychiatry in the Soviet Union published by Macmillan in London in 1971.

=== Andrei Sakharov ===
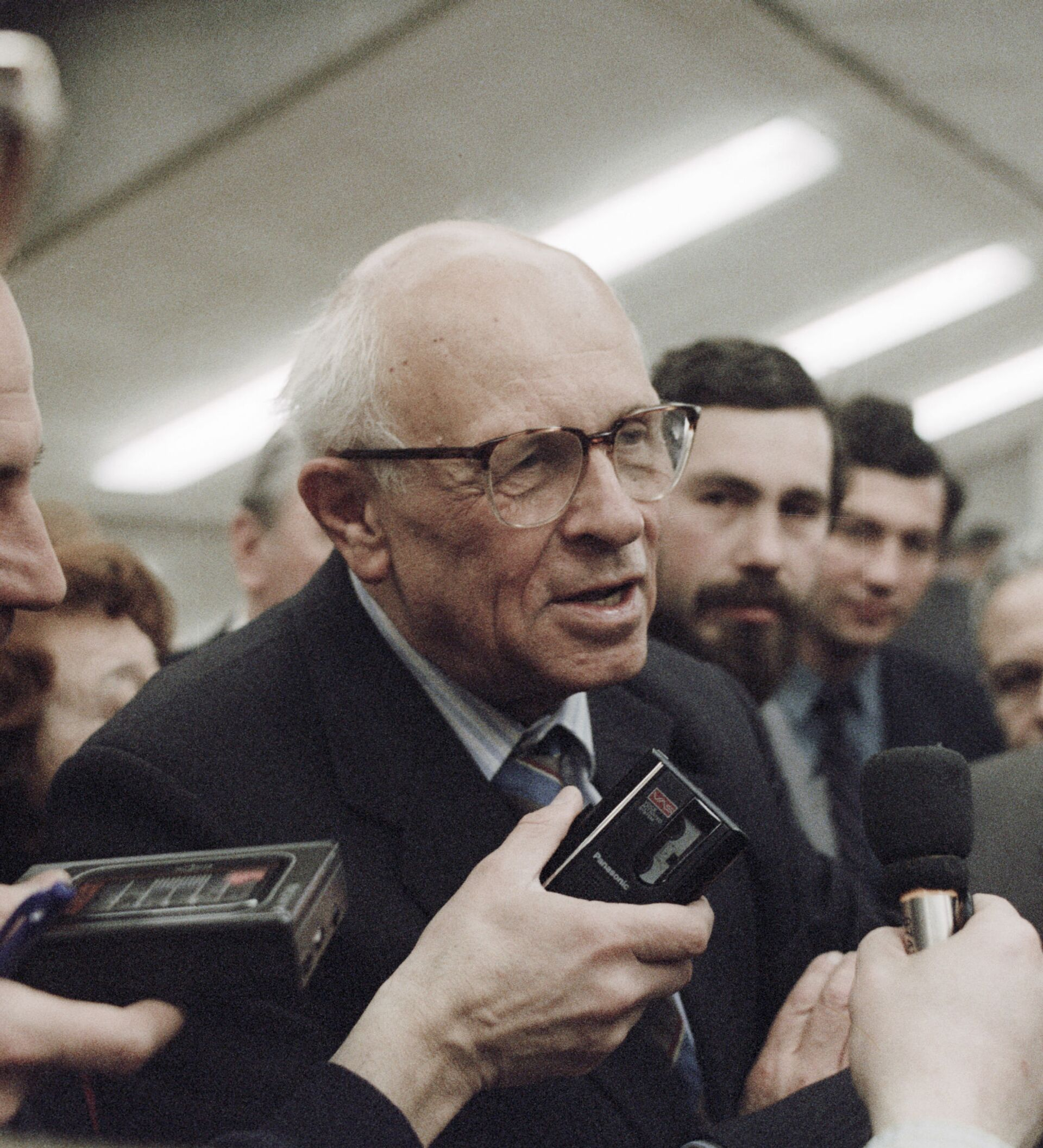
Andrei Sakharov (1921–1989), an academician of the USSR Academy of Sciences, nuclear physicist and human rights activist

In 1971, renowned Soviet physicist Andrei Sakharov supported a protest of two political prisoners, V. Fainberg and V. Borisov, who announced a hunger strike against "compulsory therapeutic treatment with medications injurious to mental activity" in a Leningrad psychiatric institution. In 1984, after publishing an article by Andrei Sakharov in the United States urging a buildup of nuclear weapons in the West, Soviet officials declared him "a talented, but sick man." When sent into internal exile to Gorky "for his own peace of mind," according to officials, "Soviet medics are taking all necessary measures to restore his health." One day in a selected auditorium, when discussing the situation in the country, Snezhnevsky, in the words of some of his clinical staff, diagnosed Sakharov with sluggish schizophrenia in absentia. The director of KGB political police department (Fifth Directorate) Philipp Bobkov concluded, "Sakharov is objectively a mentally ill person. The complication with regards to operational consequences lies in the fact that for political reasons he cannot be committed to a psychiatric hospital." Soviet authorities compulsorily committed Sakharov to a closed ward of the Semashko Hospital in Gorky, where he was force-fed and given drugs to change the state of his mind.

=== Viktor Nekipelov ===
Viktor Nekipelov, a well-known dissident poet, was arrested in 1973, sent to the Section 4 of the Serbsky Institute of Forensic Psychiatry for psychiatric evaluation, which lasted from 15 January to 12 March 1974, was judged sane (which he was), tried, and sentenced to two years' imprisonment. In 1976, he published in samizdat his book Institute of Fools: Notes on the Serbsky Institute based on his personal experience at Psychiatric Hospital of the Serbsky Institute and translated into English in 1980. In this account, he wrote compassionately, engagingly, and observantly of the doctors and other patients; most of the latters were ordinary criminals feigning insanity in order to be sent to a mental hospital, because hospital was a "cushy number" as against prison camps. According to the President of the Independent Psychiatric Association of Russia Yuri Savenko, Nekipelov's book is a highly dramatic humane document, a fair story about the nest of Soviet punitive psychiatry, a mirror that psychiatrists always need to look into. However, according to Malcolm Lader, this book as an indictment of the Serbsky Institute hardly rises above tittle-tattle and gossip, and Nekipelov destroys his own credibility by presenting no real evidence but invariably putting the most sinister connotation on events. After publishing his book, he was sentenced to the maximum punishment for "anti-Soviet agitation and propaganda" of seven years in a labor camp and then five years in internal exile.

== Political abuse of groups ==
=== AGDHR members ===
In 1968, the human rights movement in the USSR focused directly on Soviet political psychiatry, organizing public protests and writing international bodies. In 1969, a group of about 14 activists including Sergei Kovalyov, a future Russian human rights ombudsman, constituted the Action Group for the Defense of Human Rights in the USSR. The group composed the first samizdat (self-published) human rights bulletin, A Chronicle of Current Events. Among the members of the Action Group were individuals who subsequently fell victim to psychiatric abuse themselves: the poet Natalya Gorbanevskaya who in 1968 demonstrated on Red Square against bringing Soviet tanks into Czechoslovakia; Vladimir Borisov who later was one of the founders of the independent labor movement in the Soviet Union; Vladimir Maltsev, a translator; and Leonid Plyushch, a Ukrainian cyberneticist who was committed to the Special Psychiatric Hospital of Dnepropetrovsk and was awfully tortured with neuroleptics. Later three senior Fellows of the Royal College of Psychiatrists examined Leonid Plyushch and "saw no indication of schizophrenia or other mental illness."

=== AFTU members ===
In November 1977, a group of unemployed and workers led by Vladimir Klebanov, a former coalminer from the Donbas region of Ukraine, announced the formation in the Soviet Union of the Association of Free Trade Unions of Workers (AFTU) whose purposes were to meet obligations achieved by collective bargaining; to induce workers and other employees to join free trade union associations; to implement those decisions of the Association which concern the seeking of justice and the defense of rights; to educate Association members in the spirit of irreconcilability toward wastefulness, inefficiency, deception, bureaucracy, deficiencies, and a negligent attitude toward national wealth. These purposes show that AFTU was in all respects an organization whose right to exist is guaranteed by the international obligations of the Soviet Union. On 19 December 1977, Klebanov along with two other workers in Donetsk was arrested by the Soviet militia and released nine days later, after international protests against his incarceration. Worker Gavriil Yankov was incarcerated in Moscow mental hospital for two weeks. On 1 February 1978, AFTU publicly announced the institution of its organizational Charter. Several days later, Klebanov was again detained by Soviet police and sent from Moscow to psychiatric prison hospital in Donetsk. Group member Nikolaev and workers Pelekh and Dvoretsky were also placed under psychiatric detention.

=== SMOT members ===
By October 1978 it was apparent that arrests and repressions had resulted in the dissolution of AFTU. But the cause of trade union rights was to be invigorated by a new group, the Free Interprofessional Association of Workers known by its Russian acronym, SMOT, whose first press conference was held in Moscow on 28 October 1978. The objectives of SMOT were to defend its members in cases of violation of their rights in different spheres of their daily activities: political, domestic, religious, spiritual, cultural, social, and economic; to look into the legal basis of the workers' complaints; to ensure that these complains were brought to the notice of relevant organizations; to facilitate a quick solution to complaints of workers; and in cases of negative results, to publicize them widely before international and Soviet public. The leadership of SMOT was headed by a native of Leningrad electrician Vladimir Evgenievich Borisov, who was incarcerated in Soviet mental hospitals because of his human rights activism for a total of nine years in the 1960s and 1970s. In November and December 1978, Soviet police searched the homes of SMOT activists, and SMOT members Vladimir Borisov, Valeriya Novodvorskaya, Albina Yakoreva, and Lev Volokhonsky were arrested and detained by Soviet authorities. Both Borisov and Novodvorskaya were held in mental hospitals.

== Sources ==
Archival sources

- "Выписка из протокола № 151 заседания Политбюро ЦК КПСС от 22 января 1970 года" [The extract from the minutes No. 151 of the meeting of the Politburo of the Central Committee of the Communist Party of the Soviet Union of 22 January 1970] (PDF) (in Russian). Soviet Archives, collected by Vladimir Bukovsky. 22 January 1970. Archived (PDF) from the original on 14 May 2012.
- "О мерах в связи с антисоветскими материалами в английской печати (Тарсиса): Решение Президиума ЦК КПСС № 238/132 от 8 апреля 1966 по записке Николая Степановича Захарова и Романа Андреевича Руденко от 14 февраля 1966 и записке Андрея Андреевича Громыко от 5 апреля 1966" [On measures in connection with anti-Soviet materials (by Tarsis) in the British press: The resolution by the Presidium of the Central Committee of the Communist Party of the Soviet Union No. 238/132 of 8 April 1966 in response to the note by Nikolai Zakharov and Roman Rudenko of 14 February 1966 and in response to the note by Andrei Gromyko of 5 April 1966] (PDF) (in Russian). Soviet Archives, collected by Vladimir Bukovsky. 8 April 1966. Archived (PDF) from the original on 9 March 2012.
- "Sakharov's Telegram: Soviet physicist Andrei Sakharov's telegram supporting the protests of two dissidents, V. Fainberg and V. Borisov [English translation]". Revelations from the Russian Archives. Library of Congress. 22 July 2010 [1971]. Archived from the original on 22 October 2012.

Government publications and official reports

- Abuse of psychiatry for political repression in the Soviet Union: Hearing, Ninety-second Congress, second session, Part 1. Washington, D.C.: U.S. Government Printing Office. 1972.
- Abuse of psychiatry for political repression in the Soviet Union: Hearing, Ninety-second Congress, second session, Volume 2. Washington, D.C.: U.S. Government Printing Office. 1975.
- Abuse of psychiatry in the Soviet Union: hearing before the Subcommittee on Human Rights and International Organizations of the Committee on Foreign Affairs and the Commission on Security and Cooperation in Europe, House of Representatives, Ninety-eighth Congress, first session, September 20, 1983. Washington, D.C.: U.S. Government Printing Office. 1984.
- Amnesty International French Medical Commission and Valérie Marange (1991). Doctors and torture: resistance or collaboration?. Bellew Pub. ISBN 0947792562.
- British Medical Association (1992). Medicine betrayed: the participation of doctors in human rights abuses. Zed Books. ISBN 1-85649-104-8.
- International Association on the Political Use of Psychiatry, Working Group on the Internment of Dissenters in Mental Hospitals (1983). Soviet Political Psychiatry: The Story of the Opposition. London: International Association on the Political Use of Psychiatry, Working Group on the Internment of Dissenters in Mental Hospitals.
- Psychiatric abuse of political prisoners in the Soviet Union: testimony by Leonid Plyushch: hearing before the Subcommittee on International Organizations of the Committee on International Relations, House of Representatives, Ninety-fourth Congress, second session, March 30, 1976. Washington, D.C.: U.S. Government Printing Office. 1976.
- Society for International Development (1984). Development: Seeds of change, village through global order. Society for International Development. p. 19.
- Reform and human rights: the Gorbachev record. Washington, D.C.: U.S. Government Printing Office. 1988.
- U.S. Department of State, Commission on Security and Cooperation in Europe (1989). "Report of the U.S. Delegation to Assess Recent Changes in Soviet Psychiatry" (PDF). Schizophrenia Bulletin. 15 (4 Suppl): 1–79. doi:10.1093/schbul/15.suppl_1.1. PMID 2638045. Archived from the original (PDF) on 29 November 2015.
  - "(Russian translation)" (PDF) (in Russian). 1989. Archived from the original (PDF) on 7 April 2014 – via Global Initiative on Psychiatry.

Books

- Ball, Terence; Farr, James (1984). After Marx. CUP Archive. ISBN 0-521-27661-6.
- Birstein, Vadim (2004). The perversion of knowledge: the true story of the Soviet science. Westview Press. ISBN 0-8133-4280-5.
- Bloch, Sidney; Reddaway, Peter (1977). Russia's political hospitals: The abuse of psychiatry in the Soviet Union. Victor Gollancz Ltd. ISBN 0-575-02318-X.
- Bloch, Sidney; Reddaway, Peter (1985). Soviet psychiatric abuse: the shadow over world psychiatry. Westview Press. ISBN 0-8133-0209-9.
- Brintlinger, Angela; Vinitsky, Ilya (2007). Madness and the mad in Russian culture. University of Toronto Press. ISBN 978-0-8020-9140-6.
- Brodsky, Joseph; Haven, Cynthia (2002). Joseph Brodsky: conversations. Univ. Press of Mississippi. ISBN 1-57806-528-3.
- Bukovsky, Vladimir; Gluzman, Semyon (1975a). A manual of psychiatry for political dissidents. London: Amnesty International. OCLC 872337790.
- Bukovskiĭ, Vladimir; Gluzman, Semyon (1975b). Håndbog i psykiatri for afvigere [A manual on psychiatry for dissidents] (in Danish). Göteborg: Samarbetsdynamik AB. ISBN 9185396001. OCLC 7551381.
- Bukovskij, Vladimir; Gluzman, Semen; Leva, Marco (1979). Guida psichiatrica per dissidenti. Con esempi pratici e una lettera dal Gulag [Psychiatric guide for dissidents. With practical examples and a letter from the Gulag] (in Italian). Milan: L'erba voglio. ASIN B00E3B4JK4.
- Bursten, Ben (2001). Psychiatry on trial: fact and fantasy in the courtroom. McFarland. ISBN 0-7864-1078-7.
- Christenson, Ron (1999). Political trials: Gordian knots in the law. Transaction Publishers. ISBN 0-7658-0473-5.
- Dmitrieva, Tatyana [Татьяна Дмитриева] (2002). Законодательство Российской Федерации в области психиатрии. Комментарий к закону РФ о психиатрической помощи и гарантиях прав граждан при ее оказании, ГК РФ и УК РФ (в части, касающейся лиц с психическими расстройствами) [The legislation of the Russian Federation in the field of psychiatry. Commentary on the Law of the Russian Federation on Mental Health Care and Guarantees of Citizens' Rights during Its Provision, on the Civil Code and the Criminal Code of the Russian Federation (with regard to people with mental disorders)] (PDF) (in Russian). Mоscow: Спарк [Spark]. ISBN 5-88914-187-2. Archived from the original (PDF) on 2 November 2013.
- Dmitrieva, Tatyana [Татьяна Дмитриева] (2001). Альянс права и милосердия: о проблеме защиты прав человека в психиатрии [The alliance of law and mercy: on the issue of human rights protection in psychiatry] (in Russian). Mоscow: Nauka. ISBN 5020226645.
- Fedor, Julie (2011). Russia and the Cult of State Security: The Chekist Tradition, From Lenin to Putin. Routledge. ISBN 978-1136671869.
- Finckenauer, James (1995). Russian youth: law, deviance, and the pursuit of freedom. Transaction Publishers. ISBN 1-56000-206-9.
- Ghodse, Hamid (2011). International Perspectives on Mental Health. RC Psych Publications. p. 422. ISBN 978-1908020000.
- Grigorenko, Pyotr [Пётр Григоренко] (1981). В подполье можно встретить только крыс… [In the underground one can meet only rats…] (in Russian). Нью-Йорк [New York]: Детинец [Detinets].
- Grigorenko, Pyotr (1982). Memoirs. New York: Norton. ISBN 0-393-01570-X.
- Grigorenko, Elena; Ruzgis, Patricia; Sternberg, Robert (1997). Psychology of Russia: past, present, future. Nova Publishers. ISBN 1-56072-389-0.
- Hegarty, Angela; Leonard, Siobhan (1999). Human rights: 21st century. Routledge. ISBN 1-85941-393-5.
- Helmchen, Hanfried; Sartorius, Norman (2010). Ethics in Psychiatry: European Contributions. Springer. ISBN 978-90-481-8720-1.
- Hunt, Kathleen (1998). Abandoned to the state: cruelty and neglect in Russian orphanages. Human Rights Watch. ISBN 1-56432-191-6.
- Jacobson, Julius (1972). Soviet communism and the socialist vision. Transaction Publishers. ISBN 0-87855-005-4.
- Jena, S.P.K. (2008). Behaviour Therapy: Techniques, Research and Applications. Sage Publications. ISBN 978-0-7619-3624-4.
- Kadarkay, Árpád (1982). Human rights in American and Russian political thought. University Press of America. ISBN 978-0-8191-2481-4.
- Karatnycky, Adrian; Motyl, Alexander; Sturmthal, Adolf (1980). Workers' rights, East and West: a comparative study of trade union and workers' rights in Western democracies and Eastern Europe. Transaction Publishers. ISBN 0-87855-867-5.
- Keefer, Janice; Pavlychko, Solomea (1998). Two lands, new visions: stories from Canada and Ukraine. Coteau Books. ISBN 1-55050-134-8.
- Knapp, Martin (2007). Mental health policy and practice across Europe: the future direction of mental health care. McGraw-Hill International. ISBN 978-0-335-21467-9.
- Kondratev, Fedor [Фёдор Кондратьев] (2010). Судьбы больных шизофренией: клинико-социальный и судебно-психиатрический аспекты [The fates of the ill with schizophrenia: clinico-social and forensico-psychiatric aspects] (PDF) (in Russian). Moscow: ЗАО Юстицинформ [Closed joint-stock company Justitsinform]. Archived (PDF) from the original on 1 February 2014.
- Korolenko, Caesar; Dmitrieva, Nina [Цезарь Короленко, Нина Дмитриева] (2000). Социодинамическая психиатрия [Sociodynamic Psychiatry] (in Russian). Moscow: Академический проект [Academic Project]. ISBN 5829100150.
- Korotenko, Ada; Alikina, Natalia [Ада Коротенко, Наталия Аликина] (2002). Советская психиатрия: Заблуждения и умысел [Soviet psychiatry: fallacies and wilfulness] (in Russian). Kiev: Издательство «Сфера» [Publishing house "Sphere"]. ISBN 966-7841-36-7.
- Kutchins, Herb; Kirk, Stuart (1997). Making us crazy. DSM: the psychiatric bible and the creation of mental disorders. Free Press. ISBN 0-684-82280-6.
- Laqueur, Walter (1980). The Political Psychology of Appeasement: Finlandization and Other Unpopular Essays. Transaction Publishers. ISBN 1412838320.
- Leichter, Howard (1979). A comparative approach to policy analysis: health care policy in four nations. CUP Archive. ISBN 0-521-29601-3.
- Lisle, Angela (2010). Reflexive Practice. Xlibris Corporation. ISBN 978-1-4500-9197-8.
- Malterud, Kirsti; Hunskaar, Steinar (2002). Chronic myofascial pain: a patient-centered approach. Radcliffe Publishing. ISBN 1-85775-947-8.
- Marsh, Rosalind (1986). Soviet fiction since Stalin: science, politics and literature. Croom Helm. ISBN 0-7099-1776-7.
- Matvejević, Predrag (2004). Between exile and asylum: an eastern epistolary. Central European University Press. ISBN 963-9241-85-7.
- McCauley, Martin (1998). Gorbachev. Pearson Education. ISBN 0-582-43758-X.
- Medvedev, Žores; Medvedev, Roj (1971). A Question of Madness: Repression by Psychiatry in the Soviet Union. Macmillan.
- Metzl, Jonathan (2010). The Protest Psychosis: How Schizophrenia Became a Black Disease. Beacon Press. ISBN 978-0-8070-8592-9.
- Munro, Robin (2002). Dangerous minds: political psychiatry in China today and its origins in the Mao era. Human Rights Watch. ISBN 1-56432-278-5.
- Nekipelov, Viktor (1980). Institute of fools: notes from the Serbsky (translated by Marco Carynnyk and Marta Horban). Orion Books Limited. ISBN 0575028920.
- Noll, Richard (2007). The encyclopedia of schizophrenia and other psychotic disorders. Infobase Publishing. ISBN 978-0-8160-6405-2.
- Novodvorskaya, Valeriya [Валерия Новодворская] (1993). По ту сторону отчаяния [Beyond Despair] (in Russian). Moscow: Издательство «Новости» [Publishing house "News"].
- Parr, Leslie (1981). Science of the Times: a New York Times survey. New York Times Books. ISBN 0-8129-0761-2.
- Pietikäinen, Petteri (2015). Madness: A History. Routledge. ISBN 978-1317484448.
- Podrabinek, Alexander (1980). Punitive medicine. Karoma Publishers. ISBN 0-89720-022-5.
- Pospielovsky, Dimitry (1988). Soviet Anti-Religious Campaigns and Persecutions: Vol. 2 of A History of Soviet Atheism in Theory and Practice, and the Believer. New York: St Martin's Press. ISBN 0312009054.
- Pukhovsky, Nikolai [Николай Пуховский] (2001). Очерки общей психопатологии шизофрении [Essays on the general psychopathology of schizophrenia] (in Russian). Moscow: Академический проект [Academic Project]. ISBN 5-8291-0154-8.
- Reddaway, Peter (1972). Uncensored Russia: protest and dissent in the Soviet Union: the unofficial Moscow journal, a Chronicle of current events. American Heritage Press. ISBN 0070513546.
- Reddaway, Peter; Glinski, Dmitri (2001). The tragedy of Russia's reforms: market bolshevism against democracy. US Institute of Peace Press. ISBN 1-929223-06-4.
- Rejali, Darius (2009). Torture and Democracy. Princeton: Princeton University Press. ISBN 978-0-691-14333-0.
- Sabshin, Melvin (2009). Changing American psychiatry: a personal perspective. American Psychiatric Pub. p. 95. ISBN 978-1-58562-307-5.
- Semple, David; Smyth, Roger; Burns, Jonathan (2005). Oxford handbook of psychiatry. Oxford: Oxford University Press. ISBN 0-19-852783-7.
- Stone, Alan (1985). Law, Psychiatry, and Morality: Essays and Analysis. American Psychiatric Pub. ISBN 0-88048-209-5.
- Struk, Danilo (1993). Encyclopedia of Ukraine. Vol. 4. London: University of Toronto Press Incorporated. ISBN 0-8020-3009-2.
- Szasz, Thomas (1991). Ideology and insanity: Essays on the psychiatric dehumanization of man. Syracuse University Press. ISBN 0815602561.
- Tarsis, Valeriĭ (1965). Ward 7: an autobiographical novel. Dutton.
- Vitaliev, Vitali (1991). Dateline freedom. Hutchinson. ISBN 0-09-174677-9.
- Voren, Robert van (2009a). On dissidents and madness: From the Soviet Union of Leonid Brezhnev to the "Soviet Union" of Vladimir Putin. Amsterdam & New York: Rodopi Publishers. ISBN 978-90-420-2585-1.
- Voren, Robert van (2010b). Cold war in psychiatry: human factors, secret actors. Amsterdam & New York: Rodopi Publishers. ISBN 978-90-420-3048-0.
- Voren, Robert van (2013). Psychiatry as a tool of coercion in post-Soviet countries (PDF). The European Parliament. doi:10.2861/28281. ISBN 978-92-823-4595-5. Russian text: Voren, Robert van [Роберт ван Ворен] (2013). "Психиатрия как средство репрессий в советских и постсоветских странах" [Psychiatry as a tool of coercion in post-Soviet countries]. Вестник Ассоциации психиатров Украины [The Herald of the Ukrainian Psychiatric Association] (in Russian) (5). The Ukrainian Psychiatric Association.
- Voren, Robert van; Bloch, Sidney (1989). Soviet psychiatric abuse in the Gorbachev era. International Association on the Political Use of Psychiatry. ISBN 90-72657-01-2.
- West, Donald; Green, Richard (1997). Sociolegal control of homosexuality: a multi-nation comparison. Springer. ISBN 0-306-45532-3.
- Wilson, Andrew; Bachkatov, Nina (1992). Russia Revised: Alphabetical Key to the Soviet Debacle and the New Republics. Deutsch. ISBN 0-233-98783-5.
- Wing, John; Mechanic, David (2009). Reasoning about Madness. Transaction Publishers. ISBN 978-1-4128-1057-9.
- Zdravkovska, Smilka; Duren, Peter (1993). Golden years of Moscow mathematics. AMS Bookstore. ISBN 0-8218-9003-4.
- Ziolkowski, Margaret (1998). Literary exorcisms of Stalinism: Russian writers and the Soviet past. Camden House. ISBN 1-57113-179-5.

Journal articles and book chapters

- "15 лет Независимому психиатрическому журналу" [15th anniversary of the Independent Psychiatric Journal]. Nezavisimiy Psikhiatricheskiy Zhurnal (in Russian) (4). 2005. ISSN 1028-8554.
- "The trial of Iosif Brodsky: A transcript". The New Leader (47): 6–7. 31 August 1964.
- "Смотрели за каждым… «Палата № 7»" [They watched anyone… "Ward 7"]. Вопросы литературы [Questions of Literature] (in Russian) (2). 1996. Archived from the original on 30 September 2015.
- "Цитатник номера" [Quote set of the issue]. Вестник Ассоциации психиатров Украины [The Herald of the Ukrainian Psychiatric Association] (in Russian) (5). The Ukrainian Psychiatric Association. 2013.
- Abouelleil, Mohammed; Bingham, Rachel (September 2014). "Can psychiatry distinguish social deviance from mental disorder?". Philosophy, Psychiatry, & Psychology. 21 (3): 243–255. doi:10.1353/ppp.2014.0043.
- Adler, Nancy; Gluzman, Semyon (December 1993). "Soviet special psychiatric hospitals. Where the system was criminal and the inmates were sane". The British Journal of Psychiatry. 163 (6): 713–720. doi:10.1192/bjp.163.6.713. PMID 8306112.
- Alexéyeff, Sergei (31 January 1976). "Abuse of psychiatry as a tool for political repression in the Soviet Union". The Medical Journal of Australia. 1 (5): 122–123. doi:10.5694/j.1326-5377.1976.tb109281.x. PMID 1263959.
- Bebtschuk, Marina; Smirnova, Daria; Khayretdinov, Oleg (April 2012). "Family and family therapy in Russia". International Review of Psychiatry. 24 (2): 121–127. doi:10.3109/09540261.2012.656305. PMID 22515460.
- Bonnie, Richard (2002). "Political Abuse of Psychiatry in the Soviet Union and in China: Complexities and Controversies" (PDF). The Journal of the American Academy of Psychiatry and the Law. 30 (1): 136–144. PMID 11931362. Archived from the original (PDF) on 28 September 2011.
- Bukovsky, Vladimir; Gluzman, Semyon [Владимир Буковский, Семён Глузман] (January–February 1975c). "Пособие по психиатрии для инакомыслящих" [A manual on psychiatry for dissidents] (PDF). Хроника защиты прав в СССР [Chronicle of defense of rights in the USSR] (in Russian) (13): 36–61.
- Bukovsky, Vladimir; Gluzman, Semyon (Winter–Spring 1975d). "A manual on psychiatry for dissidents". Survey: A Journal of East and West Studies. 21 (1): 180–199.
- Bukovsky, Vladimir; Gluzman, Semyon (1975e). "A dissident's guide to psychiatry". A Chronicle of Human Rights in the USSR (13). New York: Kronika Press: 31–57.
- Boukovsky, Vladimir; Glouzmann, Semion (September 1975). "Guide de psychiatrie pour les dissidents soviétiques: dédié à Lonia Pliouchtch, victime de la terreur psychiatrique" [Guide on psychiatry for Soviet dissidents: dedicated to Lyonya Plyushch, a victim of psychiatric terror]. Esprit (in French). 449 (9): 307–332. JSTOR 24263203.
- Bukowski, Wladimir; Gluzman, Semen (1976). "Psychiatrie-handbuch für dissidenten" [A manual on psychiatry for dissidents]. Samisdat. Stimmen aus dem "anderen Rußland" (in German) (8). Bern: 29–48.
- Chodoff, Paul (September 1985). "Ethical conflicts in psychiatry: the Soviet Union vs. the U.S.". Hospital and Community Psychiatry. 36 (9): 925–928. doi:10.1176/ps.36.9.925. PMID 4065851.
- Fainberg, Victor (1975). "My five years in mental hospitals". Index on Censorship. 4 (2): 67–71. doi:10.1080/03064227508532427.
- Faraone, Stephen (October 1982). "Psychiatry and political repression in the Soviet Union". American Psychologist. 37 (10): 1105–1112. doi:10.1037/0003-066x.37.10.1105. PMID 7149424.
- Gershman, Carl (1984). "Psychiatric abuse in the Soviet Union". Society. 21 (5): 54–59. doi:10.1007/BF02695434. PMID 11615169.
- Gluzman, Semyon [Семён Глузман] (2013). "Снежневский" [Snezhnevsky]. Вестник Ассоциации психиатров Украины [The Herald of the Ukrainian Psychiatric Association] (in Russian) (6). The Ukrainian Psychiatric Association: 79–80.
- Gluzman, Semyon [Семён Глузман] (2013b). "История психиатрических репрессий" [The history of psychiatric repression]. Вестник Ассоциации психиатров Украины [The Herald of the Ukrainian Psychiatric Association] (in Russian) (2). The Ukrainian Psychiatric Association.
- Gluzman, Semyon [Семён Глузман] (2009a). "Украинское лицо судебной психиатрии" [The Ukrainian face of forensic psychiatry]. Новости медицины и фармации [Medicine and Pharmacy News] (in Russian). 15 (289). Издательский дом «Заславский» ["Zaslavsky" Publishing House].
- Gluzman, Semyon [Семён Глузман] (2009b). "Этиология психиатрических злоупотреблений: попытка мультидисциплинарного анализа" [The etiology of psychiatric abuses: an attempt at multidisciplinary analysis]. Новости медицины и фармации [Medicine and Pharmacy News] (in Russian). 20 (300): 18–19.
- Gluzman, Semyon [Семён Глузман] (January 2010a). "Этиология злоупотреблений в психиатрии: попытка мультидисциплинарного анализа" [The etiology of abuses in psychiatry: an attempt at multidisciplinary analysis]. Нейроnews: Психоневрология и нейропсихиатрия [Neuronews: Psychoneurology and Neuropsychiatry] (in Russian). 1 (20). Archived from the original on 17 November 2015.
- Gushansky, Emmanuil [Эммауил Гушанский] (2005). "Предисловие к книге Анатолия Прокопенко «Безумная психиатрия»" [Preface to the book by Anatoly Prokopenko Mad Psychiatry]. In Taras, Anatoly [Анатолий Tapac] (ed.). Карательная психиатрия [Punitive psychiatry] (in Russian). Moscow & Minsk: АСТ, Харвест [AST, Harvest]. pp. 33–34. ISBN 5170301723.
- Horvath, Robert (February 2014). "Breaking the Totalitarian Ice: The Initiative Group for the Defense of Human Rights in the USSR". Human Rights Quarterly. 36 (1): 147–175. doi:10.1353/hrq.2014.0013.
- Joffe, Olimpiad (July 1984). "Perspectives on Soviet Law for the 1980s". American Journal of International Law. 78 (3): 728–732.
- Khvorostianov, Natalia; Elias, Nelly (2015). "'Leave us alone!': Representation of social work in the Russian immigrant media in Israel". International Social Work. 60 (2): 409–422. doi:10.1177/0020872815574131.
- Koryagin, Anatoly (30 June 1988). "World psychiatry: readmitting the Soviet Union". The Lancet. 2 (8605): 268–269. doi:10.1016/S0140-6736(88)92549-4. PMID 11644351.
- Koryagin, Anatoly (March 1989). "The involvement of Soviet psychiatry in the persecution of dissenters". The British Journal of Psychiatry. 154 (3): 336–340. doi:10.1192/bjp.154.3.336. PMID 2597834.
- Kosserev, Igor; Crawshaw, Ralph (1994). "Medicine and the Gulag". BMJ. 309 (6970): 1726–1730. doi:10.1136/bmj.309.6970.1726. PMC 2542687. PMID 7820004.
- Kovalyov, Andrei [Андрей Ковалёв] (2007). "Взгляд очевидца на предысторию принятия закона о психиатрической помощи" [View of the eyewitness to the backstory of the adoption of the Mental Health Law]. Nezavisimiy Psikhiatricheskiy Zhurnal (in Russian) (3): 82–90.
- Lader, Malcolm (26 July 1980). "Prisoners of psychiatry". BMJ. 281 (6235): 298–299. doi:10.1136/bmj.281.6235.297. PMC 1713856.
- Leontev, Dmitry [Дмитрий Леонтьев] (16 April 2010). "Расширить границы нормального" [Broadening the boundaries of normality]. Psychologies (in Russian) (47).
- Lyons, Declan; O'Malley, Art (December 2002). "The labelling of dissent — politics and psychiatry behind the Great Wall". The Psychiatrist. 26 (12): 443–444. doi:10.1192/pb.26.12.443.
- Magalif, Alexandr [Александр Магалиф] (2010). "Коготок увяз — всей птичке пропасть" [Chickens come home to roost]. Nezavisimiy Psikhiatricheskiy Zhurnal (in Russian) (1): 69–71. ISSN 1028-8554.
- Merskey, Harold (1978). "Political neutrality and international cooperation in medicine". Journal of Medical Ethics. 4 (2): 74–77. doi:10.1136/jme.4.2.74. PMC 1154638. PMID 671475.
- Murray, Thomas (June 1983). "Genetic screening in the workplace: ethical issues". Journal of Occupational and Environmental Medicine. 25 (6): 451–454. doi:10.1097/00043764-198306000-00009. PMID 6886846.
- Ougrin, Dennis; Gluzman, Semyon; Dratcu, Luiz (2006). "Psychiatry in post-communist Ukraine: dismantling the past, paving the way for the future". The Psychiatrist. 30 (12): 456–459. doi:10.1192/pb.30.12.456.
- Pozharov, Alexei [Алексей Пожаров] (1999). "КГБ и партия" [The KGB and the Party]. Отечественная история (in Russian) (4): 169–174.
- Pshizov, Vladimir [Владимир Пшизов] (2006). "Психиатрия тронулась?" [Has psychiatry moved on?]. Альманах "Неволя" ["Bondage" Almanac] (in Russian) (6): 72–85. Archived from the original on 26 December 2012.
- Rafalsky, Viktor [Виктор Рафальский] (1995). "Репортаж из ниоткуда" [Reportage from nowhere]. Воля: журнал узников тоталитарных систем [Unconstraint: the journal of prisoners of totalitarian systems] (in Russian) (4–5): 162–181. Archived from the original on 25 February 2020.
- Reich, Walter (13 May 1979). "Grigorenko Gets a Second Opinion". The New York Times Magazine. Russian text: Reich, Walter [Уолтер Рейч] (2013). "Иное мнение" [A Second Opinion]. Kontinent (in Russian). 152.
- Reich, Walter (November 1980a). "The case of General Grigorenko: a psychiatric reexamination of a Soviet dissident". Psychiatry: Interpersonal and Biological Processes. 43 (4): 303–323. doi:10.1080/00332747.1980.11024079. PMID 6999519.
- Reich, Walter (1980b). "The case of General Grigorenko: a second opinion". Encounter. 54 (4): 9–24. PMID 11634905.
- Rich, Vera (16 November 1991). "Soviet Union admits to abuses of psychiatry". New Scientist. 132 (1795): 13. PMID 16041887.
- Savenko, Yuri [Юрий Савенко] (2004). "Отчетный доклад о деятельности НПА России за 2000–2003 гг" [The summary report on the activities of the IPA of Russia over 2000–2003]. Nezavisimiy Psikhiatricheskiy Zhurnal (in Russian) (2). ISSN 1028-8554.
- Savenko, Yuri [Юрий Савенко] (2005a). "Карательная психиатрия в России (рецензия)" [Punitive psychiatry in Russia (review)]. Nezavisimiy Psikhiatricheskiy Zhurnal (in Russian) (1). ISSN 1028-8554.
- Savenko, Yuri [Юрий Савенко] (2007a). "Апология полицейской психиатрии" [Apology of police psychiatry]. Nezavisimiy Psikhiatricheskiy Zhurnal (in Russian) (4). ISSN 1028-8554.
- Savenko, Yuri [Юрий Савенко] (2005b). ""Институт дураков" Виктора Некипелова" [Institute of fools by Viktor Nekipelov]. Nezavisimiy Psikhiatricheskiy Zhurnal (in Russian) (4). ISSN 1028-8554.
- Savenko, Yuri [Юрий Савенко] (2007b). "Дело Андрея Новикова. Психиатрию в политических целях использует власть, а не психиатры: Интервью Ю.С. Савенко корреспонденту "Новой газеты" Галине Мурсалиевой" [The case of Andrei Novikov. Psychiatry for political purposes used by authority, not psychiatrists: Yuri Savenko interviewed by Galina Mursalieva, correspondent of "Novaya Gazeta"]. Nezavisimiy Psikhiatricheskiy Zhurnal (in Russian) (4): 88–91. ISSN 1028-8554.
- Savenko, Yuri [Юрий Савенко] (2009). "20-летие НПА России" [20th anniversary of the IPA of Russia]. Nezavisimiy Psikhiatricheskiy Zhurnal (in Russian) (1): 5–18. ISSN 1028-8554.
- Schmidt, Victoria; Shchurko, Tatsiana (September 2014). "Children's rights in post-Soviet countries: The case of Russia and Belarus". International Social Work. 57 (5): 447–458. doi:10.1177/0020872814537852.
- Shaw, David; Bloch, Sidney; Vickers, Ann (2 November 1972). "Psychiatry and the state". New Scientist. 56 (818): 258–261.
- Smythies, John (1973). "Psychiatry and the neurosciences". Psychological Medicine. 3 (3): 267–269. doi:10.1017/S0033291700049576. PMID 4125732.
- Szasz, Thomas (July–August 2004). "Pharmacracy in America". Society. 41 (5): 54–58. doi:10.1007/BF02688218.
- Szasz, Thomas (4 March 1978). "Psychiatry and dissent". The Spectator. 240 (7809): 12–13. PMID 11665013. Archived from the original on 23 February 2014.
- Szasz, Thomas (25 April 2006). "Secular humanism and "scientific psychiatry"". Philosophy, Ethics, and Humanities in Medicine. 1 (1): 5. doi:10.1186/1747-5341-1-5. PMC 1483825. PMID 16759353.
- Voren, Robert van (2002). "Comparing Soviet and Chinese Political Psychiatry" (PDF). The Journal of the American Academy of Psychiatry and the Law. 30 (1): 131–135. PMID 11931361. Archived from the original (PDF) on 26 July 2011.
- Voren, Robert van (2010a). "Political Abuse of Psychiatry—An Historical Overview". Schizophrenia Bulletin. 36 (1): 33–35. doi:10.1093/schbul/sbp119. PMC 2800147. PMID 19892821.
- Voren, Robert van [Роберт ван Ворен] (2013b). "От политических злоупотреблений психиатрией к реформе психиатрической службы" [From political abuses of psychiatry to the reform of psychiatric service]. Вестник Ассоциации психиатров Украины [The Herald of the Ukrainian Psychiatric Association] (in Russian) (2). The Ukrainian Psychiatric Association.
- Zile, Zigurds (March–April 1985). "Embarrassing in form, promising in substance. Soviet law in theory and practice". Wisconsin Law Review: 349.

Newspapers

- "Americans say Soviet dissident is sane". The Argus-Press. 16 May 1979. p. 2.
- Gluzman, Semyon [Семён Глузман] (2010b). "Расширенная судебно-психиатрическая заочная экспертиза по делу Григоренко Петра Григорьевича, 1907 г.р., украинца, жителя г. Москвы (восстановлено на основании копии Самиздата)" [A comprehensive in absentia psychiatric opinion on the case of Grigorenko Pyotr Grigoryevich, b. 1907, a Ukrainian, Moscow resident (restored on the basis of a Samizdat copy)]. Новости медицины и фармации [Medicine and Pharmacy News] (in Russian). No. 329.
- Harper, Catherine (28 April 1977). "Where dissent may spell torture of mind and body". The Sydney Morning Herald. p. 7.
- Heinrichs, Paul (22 April 1977). "Tortured activist wants Russia condemned". The Age. p. 11.
- Mosby, Aline (4 February 1977). "Jailed Soviet dissident didn't dare show fear". Sarasota Herald-Tribune. p. 38.
- Thorne, Ludmilla (18 January 1977a). "Inside Russia's mental prisons". Lakeland Ledger. p. 56.
- Thorne, Ludmilla (21 June 1977b). "Inside Russia's mental prisons". The Times-News. p. 11.

Websites

- Fedenko, Pavel [Павел Феденко] (9 October 2009). "Был бы человек, а диагноз найдется" [A diagnosis is quickly found to attribute a person with]. The BBC Russian Service.
- Gorelik, Kristina [Кристина Горелик] (9 October 2013). "Карательная психиатрия в СССР (фото советских спецпсихбольниц, снятые в конце 1960-х — начале 1980-х)" [Punitive psychiatry in the USSR (photos of Soviet special psychiatric hospitals which were being shot from the late 1960s to the early 1980s)]. Радио Свобода (in Russian). Radio Liberty.
- Kekelidze, Zurab [Зураб Кекелидзе] (22 October 2013). "Кому выгоден миф о карательной психиатрии? (Пресс-конференция проф. З.И. Кекелидзе в связи с направлением на принудительное лечение оппозиционера Михаила Косенко)" [For whom is the myth of punitive psychiatry profitable? (Press conference of prof. Z.I. Kekelidze in connection with sending oppositionist Mikhail Kosenko to compulsory treatment)] (in Russian). Independent Psychiatric Association of Russia.
- Sulkin, Oleg [Олег Сулькин] (19 July 2012). "Сын генерала Петра Григоренко готовит сборник памяти отца" [General Petr Grogorenko's son is preparing a collection in memory of his father] (in Russian). Voice of America.
- Tolstoy, Ivan; Gavrilov, Andrey [Иван Толстой, Андрей Гаврилов] (14 December 2014). "Генерал Григоренко" [General Grigorenko]. Радио Свобода (in Russian). Radio Liberty.
