= Personality clash =

Type of conflict between people

A personality clash occurs when two (or more) people find themselves in conflict not over a particular issue or incident, but due to a fundamental incompatibility in their personalities, their approaches to things, or their style of life.

A personality clash may occur in work-related, school-related, family-related, or social situations.

== Types ==
Carl Jung saw the polarity of extraversion and introversion as a major potential cause of personality conflicts in everyday life, as well as underlying many past intellectual and philosophical disputes.

He also opposed thinking and feeling types, intuitive and sensation types, as potential sources of misunderstanding between people; while other typologies can and have been developed since.

== In the workplace ==
The issue of personality clashes in the workplace is controversial. According to the Australian government, the two types of workplace conflicts are when people's ideas, decisions or actions relating directly to the job are in opposition, or when two people just don't get along. Turner and Weed argue that in a conflict situation, don’t ask who, ask what and why. Managers should avoid blaming interpersonal conflicts on personality clashes. Such a tactic is an excuse to avoid addressing the real causes of conflict, and the department’s performance will suffer as a result. Managers must be able to recognize the signs of conflict behaviors and deal with the conflict in a forthright fashion. Approaching conflicts as opportunities to improve departmental policies and operations rather as ailments to be eradicated or ignored will result in a more productive work force and greater departmental efficiency. However, in order to avoid recognizing harsher business bullying situations, employers are more likely to refer to these actions as a personality clash.

== In therapy ==
Sigmund Freud thought a harmonious match of therapist and patient was essential for psychotherapy; but subsequent experience has demonstrated that success can follow even where there is an underlying personality clash.

Neville Symington indeed saw a patient's willingness to proceed with therapy, despite her dislike of him, as a positive sign of health, and as a beginning repudiation of her narcissism.

== Remedies ==
Some suggest that the only answer to a personality clash is the folk remedy of distancing - reducing contact with the clashing personality involved. Other recommendations are to focus on the positives in the other person, and to examine one's own psychodynamics for clues as to why one is finding them so difficult - perhaps due to a projection of some unacknowledged part of one's own personality.

Howard Gardner saw a major part of what he called interpersonal intelligence as the ability to mediate and resolve such personality clashes from the outside.

== Examples ==
=== Actual ===
- Circumstances conspired to produce a painful personality clash between the ordered, cerebral, emotionally contained A. J. P. Taylor, and the spendthrift, bohemian, expansive Dylan Thomas.
- The clash between the cautious, moderate Harley and the mercurial, extremist Bolingbroke at the close of Queen Anne's reign did much to usher in the long Whig ascendency that followed.
- The personality clash between Henry Tizard and Frederick Lindemann had adverse effects on the Allied conduct of World War Two.

=== Literary ===
- C. P. Snow in his semi-autobiographical novel on the corridors of power described caballing with someone whose temperament "clashed right at the roots with mine: even if he was not being offensive, he would have tempted me to say something hard. But I was doing a job, and I couldn't afford luxuries, certainly not the luxury of being myself".

== See also ==
- Collusion (psychology)
- Differential psychology
- Myers-Briggs Type Indicator
- Organizational conflict
- Personality psychology
