= Collider (disambiguation) =

A collider is a type of particle accelerator.

Collider may also refer to:

- Collider (band), an electroclash punk rock band formed in New York City in 1997
- Collider (Cartel album), 2013
- Collider (Fur Patrol album), 2003
- Collider (Sam Roberts album), 2011
- Collider (film), 2013
- Collider (statistics), a statistical variable
- Collider (website), an online entertainment publication and subsidiary of the media company Valnet
- "Collider", a song by X Ambassadors from VHS (album)
- "Collider", a song by Noisia from Outer Edges

== See also ==
- Collide (disambiguation)
- Collision (disambiguation)
