= Backbiter =

US musical group

Backbiter is a protopunk band from Los Angeles, California that has received national recognition. They played their first show October 23, 1991, at the Shamrock Bar in Hollywood, CA on a bill with Dicktit, the Jack Brewer Band and The Drills (whose organist, Jeff Muendel, later joined Backbiter for a few years and one album). Singer/guitarist Jonathan Hall had been playing in Texorcist (the Los Angeles band with Linda "Texacala" Jones, formerly of Tex and the Horseheads, not the Texas band of the same name) and the Angry Samoans with and bassist Heath Seifert. They jammed with drummer Bob Lee (one of the Devo Bob drummers) and the power trio came together, playing local clubs such as the notable post-punk hangout, Raji's.

The band released their first CD, Get Together in 1994. A second effort in 2001, a split-CD with Swedish band Elope on Man's Ruin Records (MR-2015) featured Muendel on Hammond B3 organ. Hall doesn’t sing about warlocks and unicorns, nor does the group sludge it up in an overtly Black Sabbath fashion, but the association with Man’s Ruin has associated them with the Stoner rock movement. That release is arguably their heaviest.

The band released a third album in 2006, once again as power trio sans the organ. The band continues to play live shows throughout California. They received LA Weekly's Heavy Metal Band of the Year award, which was presented to them by musician Ronnie James Dio.

== Band members ==
=== Current members ===
- Jonathan Hall - vocals, guitar
- Heath Seifert - bass
- Bob Lee - drums, vocals

=== Former members ===
- Jeff Muendel - Hammond organ (1994–1997)
