= I'm Glad (disambiguation) =

"I'm Glad" is a song by Jennifer Lopez

I'm Glad may also refer to:

- "I'm Glad", a song by Al B. Sure! from Honey I'm Home (2009)
- "I'm Glad", a song by Bix Beiderbecke, written by Frankie Trumbauer (1969)
- "I'm Glad", a song by Collision, written by Mike King (1982)
- "I'm Glad", a song by Field Music from Commontime (2016)
- "I'm Glad", a song by Findlay Brown (2006)
- "I'm Glad", a song by Captain Beefheart from Safe as Milk (1967)
