= Collision (disambiguation) =

A collision is an isolated event in which two or more bodies exert relatively strong forces on each other for a relatively short time.

Collision may also refer to:

== Films ==
- Collision (1932 film), a 1932 British crime film
- Collision (2009 film), a documentary film of a debate about Christianity
- Collision (2013 film), a French romantic thriller
- "Collision" (2005), an abstract short film by Max Hattler

== Television ==
- Collision (TV series), a 2009 miniseries
- "Collision" (CSI: Miami), an episode of CSI: Miami
- "Collision" (Lost), a 2005 episode of the television show Lost
- "Collision" (Heroes), a 2006 episode of the television show Heroes

== Music ==
- Collision (band), a 1990s heavy metal band
- A Collision, a 2005 album by David Crowder Band
- Collisions (album), a 2005 album by Calla
- "Collision", a song by Disciple from the album Horseshoes & Handgrenades
- "Collision", a song by Saves the Day from Can't Slow Down, 1998
- "Collision", a 2023 song by Stray Kids from 5-Star

== Accidents ==
- Mid-air collision, an aviation accident in which two or more aircraft come into contact during flight
- Satellite collision, a collision between two objects in orbit around another body
- Ship collision, a collision between two ships or a ship and another object
- Traffic collision, a vehicle collision with another object
  - Head-on collision, a type of traffic collision
- Train wreck, a type of disaster involving one or more trains

== Other uses ==
- Hash collision, a computer science term
- Collision (telecommunications), or network collision
- Collision (novel), a 2008 thriller novel by Jeff Abbott

== See also ==
- Collide (disambiguation)
- Collusion (disambiguation)
