= Collide =

Collide may refer to:

== Arts and entertainment ==
=== Films ===
- Collide (2016 film), 2016 action film
- Collide (2022 film), 2022 film starring Ryan Phillippe

=== Music ===
- Collide (band), an American electro-industrial band

==== Albums ====
- Collide (The Gufs album), 1995
- Collide (Skillet album), 2003
- Collide (Andy Hunter album), 2010
- Collide (Boyz II Men album), 2014
- Collide, an album by Beats Antique

==== Songs ====
- "Collide" (Howie Day song), 2004
- "Collide" (Krystal Meyers song), 2006
- "Collide" (Leona Lewis and Avicii song), 2011
- "Collide" (Breathe Carolina song), 2014
- "Collide" (Justine Skye song), 2014
- "Collide" (Ed Sheeran song), 2021
- "Collide", by Jars of Clay from the 1999 album If I Left the Zoo
- "Collide", by VNV Nation from the 2018 album Noire
- "Collide", by EARTHGANG and Tiana Major9, from the Queen & Slim soundtrack, 2019
- "Collide", by Shea Couleé from the 2023 album 8

== See also ==
- Collider (disambiguation)
- Collision (disambiguation)
