= Marina Voikhanskaya =

Soviet-British psychiatrist (born 1934)

- Марина Войханская
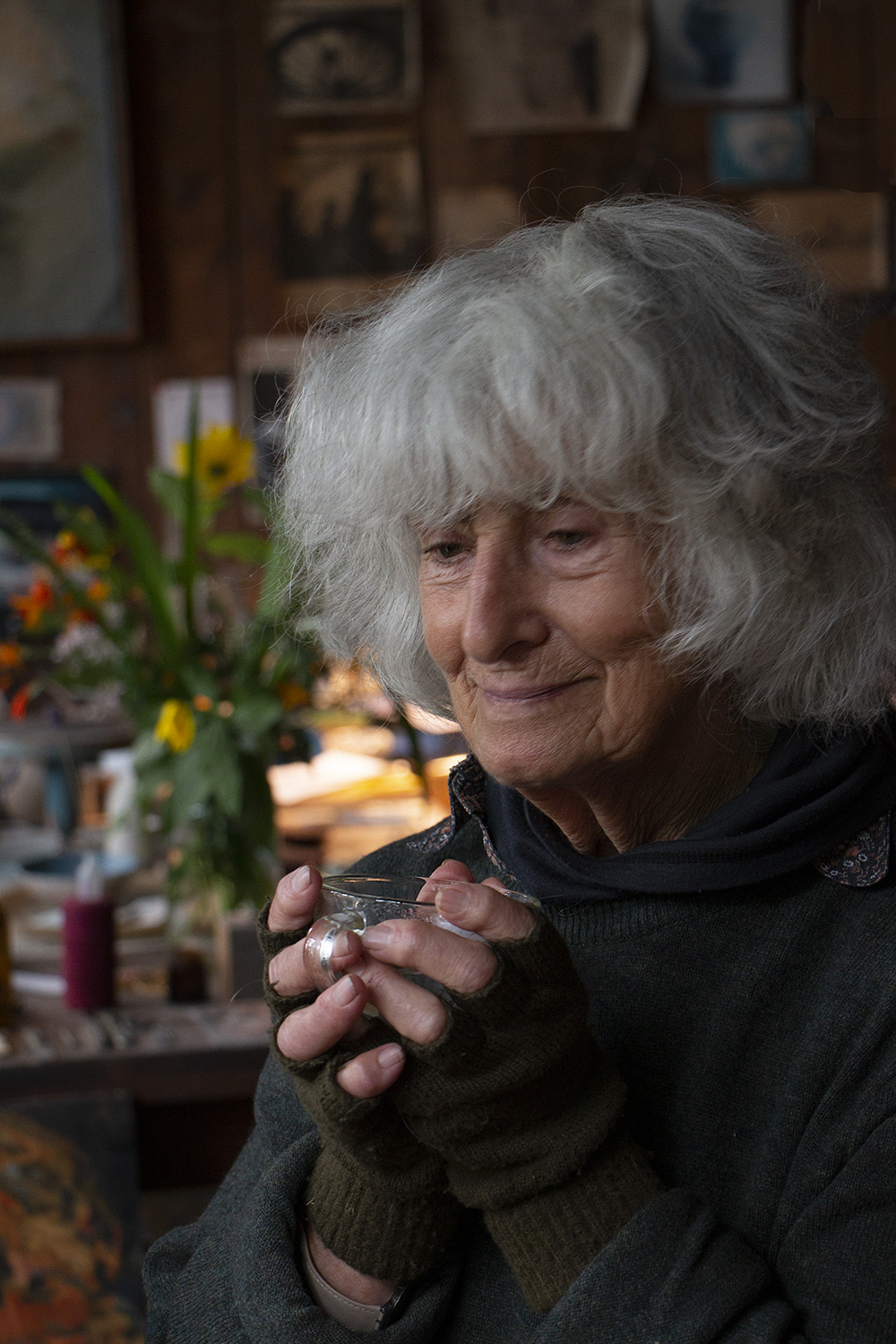
- Marina Voikhanskaya in Cambridge, August 2021
- Born: Марина Израйлевна Фридлендер (Marina Izraïlevna Fridlender); 11 November 1934; Leningrad, Soviet Union
- Citizenship: Soviet Union (1934-1975), United Kingdom (1979-present)
- Education: University of Leningrad
- Occupation: psychiatrist
- Known for: her participation in the struggle against political abuse of psychiatry in the Soviet Union, environmental activism
- Spouses: Yevgheny Voikhansky (1963–1974), Norman Cohn (2004–2007)
- Children: 1, Dr. Misha Yevgenyevich Voikhansky (1966)

Marina Voikhanskaya (Russian: Марина Войханская) (born Marina Izraïlevna Fridlender on 11 November 1934) is a Soviet-British psychiatrist who opposed the detention of patients who were committed to Soviet psychiatric hospitals for their beliefs, and not for mental health reasons. She migrated to the UK in 1975 and campaigned against the abuse of psychiatry for political purposes and for the release of her son Misha from the Soviet Union. She lives in Cambridge, UK.

== Early life and education ==
Marina Voikhanskaya studied medicine at the First Pavlov State Medical University in Leningrad and obtained her M.D. degree in 1960. Between 1962 and 1975 she worked in Leningrad’s Psychiatric Hospitals n. 2 (1962–1967) and n. 3 (1967–1975). She later exposed how in these hospitals there were overcrowded wards, underpaid doctors, bad food and poor hygienic conditions.

In the late 1970s, after her emigration to the UK, Voikhanskaya worked as a junior doctor at Fulbourn Hospital in Cambridge and West Suffolk Hospital in Bury St. Edmunds.

She later trained and practiced as a psychoanalytic psychotherapist.

== Engagement against the abuse of psychiatry in the USSR ==
Marina Voikhanskaya learned from the dissident Viktor Fainberg about psychiatric abuses in her hospital and in particular about the painter Yuri Evgenyevich Ivanov who was placed in her hospital but was not mentally ill. She visited him on a regular basis and refused to sign forms assessing dissidents as insane. As a result she was shunned by her colleagues, harassed and criticised by the hospital authorities, and the KGB began following her. Voikhanskaya is cited as one of a very small group of Soviet psychiatrists, another being the Ukrainian Semyon Gluzman, who openly opposed the Soviet abuse of psychiatry while still in the USSR. She also helped release from the psychiatric hospital the engineer Anatoly Ponomaryov, interned for his political ideas.

In 1974 she was instrumental in the release of Viktor Fainberg from the psychiatric hospital, by blackmailing the doctor in charge of his ward. She told him that if Fainberg was to die because of his hunger strike, the news would be broadcast on western media and the doctor’s name would be known. By sheer coincidence, the same night the Russian BBC broadcast discussed the case of Fainberg, convincing her colleagues that Voikhanskaya had direct connections to the west. After being released from the hospital, Fainberg migrated first to Israel and then the UK. Voikhanskaya was transferred to a geriatric ward and she was finally allowed to leave the Soviet Union in April 1975, after her citizenship was revoked. Voikhanskaya is cited as an example of the self-expatriation variant of the "forced expatriation" form of repression, one of several techniques used by the Soviet regime to neutralise dissent.

In the UK, she collaborated with Amnesty International and the Campaign Against Psychiatric Abuse (CAPA) to denounce the political abuse of psychiatry, also as a foreign member of the Working Commission To Investigate the Use of Psychiatry for Political Purposes. A few days after her emigration from the USSR, she gave a speech at the Amnesty International symposium on the use of psychiatry for political purposes in Geneva, the first testimony of this type ever given, and the participants adopted a "Declaration of Geneva" to denounce Soviet abuses. British psychiatrists relayed her plea for action by publishing a letter in the British Medical Journal. She also gave a speech at the World Congress of Psychiatry in Honolulu in August 1977, denouncing that between 700 and 1100 dissidents were detained in psychiatric hospitals of the USSR. Her case, together with other incidents, led to the condemnation of the Soviet Union at the same Congress, and prompted a reflection on abuses of psychiatry in the United States and other nations and on the ethics of maintaining professional relationships with colleagues abroad who were involved in abuses.

== Campaign for the release of Misha ==
When Voikhanskaya left the Soviet Union for the UK in 1975 she was divorced and her 9-year old son Misha was her sole responsibility, but Misha was refused permission to emigrate because the authorities put pressure on Marina's former husband Yevgeny Voikhansky to claim the child, even though he gave consent to her plans and said he did not want the boy. At the time of the Honolulu Congress (1977) Misha was still in Leningrad, supposedly because of the legal dispute over custody, but effectively held hostage by the KGB to both punish his dissenting mother and prevent any criticism of Soviet psychiatry by her in the West. A campaign for the release of Misha was organized by the Campaign Against Psychiatric Abuse (CAPA), headed by Tom Stoppard, who went to visit Misha during his trip to the Soviet Union in February 1977, and including Yehudi Menhuin, Harold Pinter and Joan Baez. This campaign was successful and Misha together with Marina’s mother Leah Fridlender (alternatively spelled Friedlander) were finally allowed to emigrate to the UK in April 1979.

== Environmental activism and charity work ==
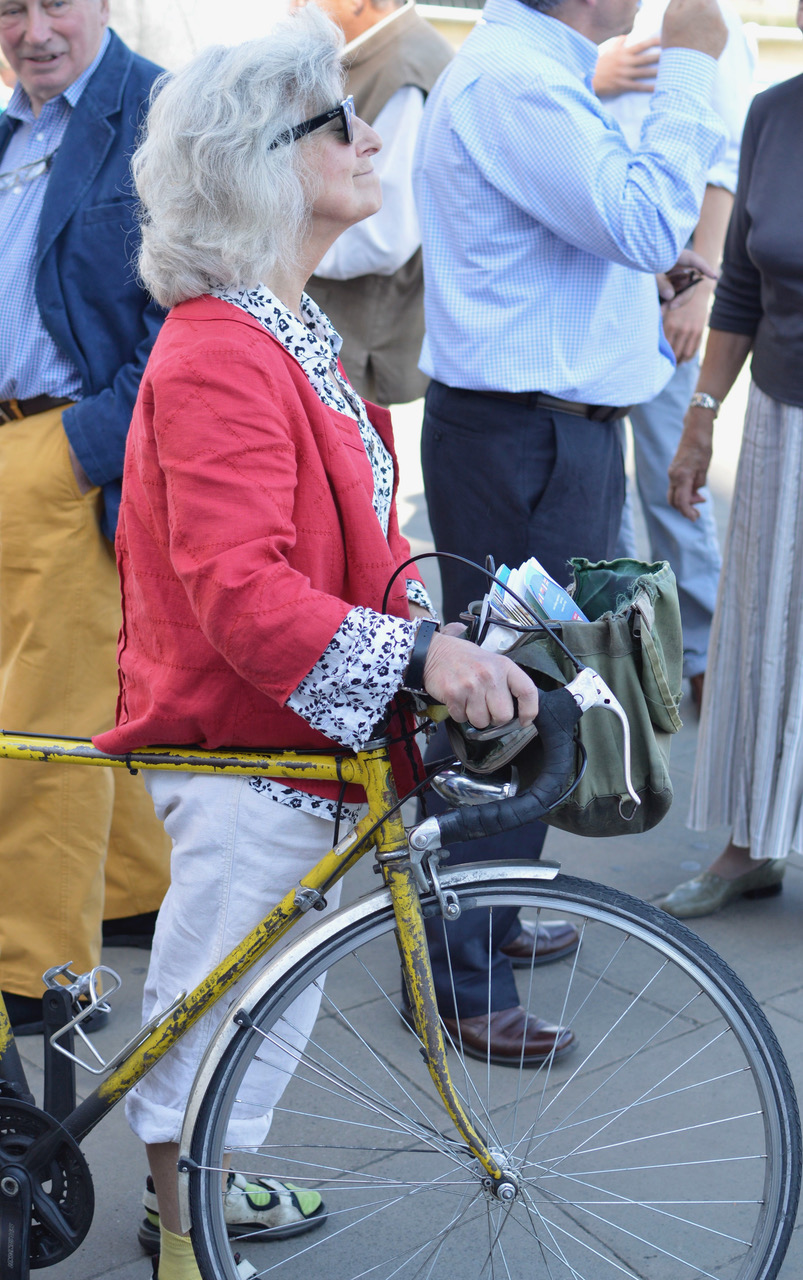
Marina Voikhanskaya and her bike Henry in Ménerbes in 2012

Marina Voikhanskaya’s use of the bicycle as a means of transportation has received media attention. She has undertaken sponsored journeys and cycle challenges for the Campaign to Protect Rural England (CPRE) in 2006, and 2010.

In 2016, her 650 km ride from England to Ménerbes was sponsored for the benefit of the hospital of Apt in Provence.

== Documentary and fiction ==
In the Alan Clarke documentary “Bukovsky” Marina Voikhanskaya appears in London in the company of British campaigners and Soviet dissidents, including David Markham, his wife Olive Dehn, Lord Avery, Tom Stoppard, Victor Fainberg, and others, at demonstrations against psychiatric abuse in the Soviet Union, organized by the Campaign Against Psychiatric Abuse (CAPA). In an interview within this documentary, Voikhanskaya recalls how she believed that her profession as a doctor was not political, and when she first heard from the BBC and the Voice of America about abuse of psychiatry in the Soviet Union, she thought that it could be anti-Soviet propaganda. However, when she spoke with Viktor Fainberg she learned that some patients were not mentally ill but were hospitalized for political reasons. After she met them, she helped them because they were not mentally ill, and she thought that doctors are not prison guards.

The story of Marina Voikhanskaya is discussed in another documentary, "The Price of Freedom" (1978).

The movie «Nina», also by Alan Clarke, is based on the character of Marina Voikhanskaya and fictionalizes her story.

== Personal life ==
Marina Voikhanskaya was married to Yevgeny Voikhansky, the father of their son Mikhail (Misha) (born in 1966), until 1974, when they divorced. Allegedly, according to what Voikhanskaya says in a recorded interview, this was because "he shopped me to the KGB" . Later Voikhanskaya was married to Norman Cohn from 2004 until his death in 2007. In the BBC Radio Program "The Roots of Extremism", Voikhanskaya comments on Cohn's emotional response to antisemitism (min 6:38) and her own experience of antisemitism during childhood (min 20:31). The reported marriage by telephone to Viktor Fainberg was never registered.
