= Campaign Against Psychiatric Abuse =

Organization founded by Soviet dissident Viktor Fainberg

The Campaign Against Psychiatric Abuse
- Formation: April 1975
- Founder: Viktor Fainberg
- Dissolved: 1988
- Type: Non-profit; NGO
- Headquarters: London, United Kingdom
- Fields: Psychiatry
- Director: Viktor Fainberg
- Chair: Henry Dicks

Campaign Against Psychiatric Abuse was a group that was founded by Soviet dissident Viktor Fainberg in April 1975 and participated in the struggle against political abuse of psychiatry in the Soviet Union from 1975 to 1988.

The Campaign involved national and international medical bodies to reveal the monstrous abuse of human rights through the misuse of psychiatry.

== Participants ==
The English branch was set up on 5 September 1975 as the British section of the Action Committee Against Abuses of Psychiatry for Political Purposes and composed of psychiatrists, other doctors, and laymen including David Markham, Max Gammon, William Shawcross, George Theiner, James Thackara, Tom Stoppard, Marina Voikhanskaya, Eric Avebury, Helen Bamber, and Vladimir Bukovsky.

The chair of the organisation was British psychiatrist Henry Dicks. From the fall of 1976, its director was Viktor Fainberg. Committees similar to the Campaign Against Psychiatric Abuse were later set up in France, Germany, and Switzerland.

== Activities ==
Campaigns of the British section of the group included a rally against psychiatric abuse in July 1976 in Trafalgar Square and led to the release of Vladimir Borisov, Vladimir Bukovsky and Leonid Plyushch. The group issued correspondence, bulletins, and other documents which are deposited in the International Institute of Social History, Amsterdam. The group was so effective that by the early 1980s Soviet psychiatry had pariah status. Opposition in Britain including the Campaign Against Psychiatric Abuse led the Royal College of Psychiatrists to establish the Special Committee on the Political Abuse of Psychiatry in 1978. The Campaign Against Psychiatric Abuse actually never said what its fallback position was, meaning that the Campaign favoured confinement of the innocent in prisons instead of mental hospitals.

== Sources ==
- "A new campaign against the political mind-benders". New Scientist. 71 (1007): 4. 1 July 1976.
- "English Psychiatrists Speak Out for Krasivsky" (PDF). The Ukrainian Weekly. No. 250. 19 December 1976. p. 2.
- Международное слушание Сахарова в Копенгагене [International Sakharov Hearing in Copenhagen] (in Russian). Sakharov Hearing Committee. 1977. p. 182.
- The Good Listener: Helen Bamber: A Life Against Cruelty. Faber & Faber. 2012. p. 270. ISBN 978-0571295272.
- Russia's political hospitals: The abuse of psychiatry in the Soviet Union. Victor Gollancz Ltd. 1977. p. 328. ISBN 0-575-02318-X.
- Boobbyer, Philip (July 2009). "Vladimir Bukovskii and Soviet Communism". The Slavonic and East European Review. 87 (3): 452–487. doi:10.1353/see.2009.0092. JSTOR 40650408.
- To Choose Freedom. Hoover Institution Press. 1987. p. 19. ISBN 0817984410.
- "Eskimo Bernard". The Listener. 115: 20. 6 March 1986.
- The Routledge Guide to European Political Archives: Sources since 1945. Routledge. 2012. p. 203. ISBN 978-1136509896.
- "Where dissent may spell torture of mind and body". The Sydney Morning Herald. 28 April 1977. p. 7.
- "Tortured activist wants Russia condemned". The Age. 22 April 1977. p. 11.
- "Where dissent is branded as madness". Jewish Observer and Middle East Review. 26: 13. 21 July 1977.
- Psychiatry on Trial. Penguin. 1977. p. 189.
- Luty, Jason (January 2014). "Psychiatry and the dark side: eugenics, Nazi and Soviet psychiatry". Advances in Psychiatric Treatment. 20 (1): 52–60. doi:10.1192/apt.bp.112.010330.
- "Виктор Файнберг, основатель движения борьбы с карательной психиатрией: нет ничего хуже психушки, укол – и ты чувствуешь, как из тебя вытекает разум и душа" [Viktor Fainberg, the founder of the movement for the struggle against punitive psychiatry: There is nothing worse than psikhushka, after injection you feel how your reason and soul comes out of you] (in Russian). Dozhd. 9 October 2013.
- "Human rights work of scientific societies". Scientists and Human Rights: Present and Future Direction. AAAS Workshop Report: 24 May 1984. 85 (19): 31. 1985.
- McKane, Richard (October 2001). "Poems from the Arsenal". Index on Censorship. 30 (4): 102–106. doi:10.1080/03064220108536983.
- "Jailed Soviet dissident didn't dare show fear". Sarasota Herald-Tribune. 4 February 1977. p. 38.
- Encyclopedia of Women Social Reformers. Vol. 2. ABC-CLIO. 2001. p. 46. ISBN 1576071014.
- "Inside Russia's mental prisons". Lakeland Ledger. 18 January 1977. p. 56.
- "Inside Russia's mental prisons". The Times-News. 21 June 1977. p. 11.
