= Henry Dicks =

British psychiatrist

Henry Victor Dicks (1900 – 12 July 1977) was a British psychiatrist. He drew on his wartime experiences, which included the medical care of Rudolf Hess, to develop views on authoritarian personality and the collective psychopathology of authoritarian regimes.

== Life ==
Henry Dicks was born at Pernau, in the Governorate of Livonia of the Russian Empire (now Estonia) in 1900. His father was an English exporter and shipowner who also acted as British Vice-Counsul, and his mother came from an academic Baltic German family. He was educated at Pernau, Riga and St Petersburg, and by the time the family returned to England after the Russian Revolution he was able to speak English, Russian, and German fluently, as well as speaking some French.

After serving as an interpreter with Military Intelligence with the British Expeditionary Force in North Russia, and then with the British Military Mission in South Russia and the Caucasus, he studied natural sciences at St John's College, Cambridge and medicine at St Bartholomew's Hospital. In 1928 he joined the recently founded Tavistock Clinic, rising to become Assistant Medical Director there from 1934 to 1946, and publishing a psychiatric textbook in 1939.

In 1941 he joined the British Army as a Specialist Psychiatrist. Because of his ability to speak German, he was charged with medical care of Rudolf Hess in May to June 1941. From 1942 to 1944 he advised Military Intelligence on German morale, from 1944 to 1945 he advised SHAEF on psychological warfare and from 1945 to 1946 he advised the Control Commission for Germany on de-Nazification.

In 1946 Dicks was appointed the first Nuffield Professor of Psychiatry at the University of Leeds, but returned to the Tavistock in 1948, and remained there until 1965 as Deputy Director and Consultant Psychiatrist in charge of the Marital Unit. From 1966 to 1970 he was a Senior Research Officer at the Centre for Research in Collective Psychopathology, University of Sussex.

His work in de-Nazification led to his writing a book entitled Licensed Mass Murder - a sociopsychological study of some SS killers. This was contributed to the Centre for Research in Collective Psychopathology at Sussex University.

In the late 1970s, he was the chair of the Campaign Against Psychiatric Abuse.

He participated with fellow campaigners in a 1976 protest outside the Soviet Embassy in London following the arrest of Vladimir Borisov. There he was quoted as saying -

British psychiatrists learn with horror of the shameful re-arrest and mistreatment of Vladimir Borisov in your hospital... Unless this ceases, your names will be linked in history with the Nazis, whose methods you have copied. Shame on you and your contemptible masters.

His papers are held at the Wellcome Library in London.

== Works ==
- Clinical studies in psychopathology: a contribution to the aetiology of neurotic illness, 1939
- The psychological foundations of the Wehrmacht, 1944
- (with John R. Rees and others) The case of Rudolf Hess: problem in diagnosis and forensic psychiatry, 1947
- Observations on contemporary Russian behavior, 1952
- Mental health in the light of ancient wisdom, 1959
- Notes on the Russian national character, in C. E. Black, ed., The Transformation of Russian Society: Aspects of social change, Cambridge, Mass: Harvard University Press, 1960.
- Marital tensions: clinical studies towards a psychological theory of interaction, 1967
- Fifty years of the Tavistock Clinic, 1970. With a foreword by Leslie Farrer.
- Licensed mass murder: a socio-psychological study of some SS killers, 1972
