= Tex Mignog =

American punk musician

Tex Mignog (1969-2002) was a punk musician. He became known as Texorcist, which is also the punk rock band he led. Mignog is the founder and Chief Subversion Officer of the Collusion Syndicate hacker group.

As the spokesperson for the Collusion Syndicate, Mignog openly appeared at computer security events such as H.O.P.E. and DefCon and was quoted by the media on computer-related security and political/cultural issues. Examples included KVUE News, the Austin American-Statesman and The Washington Post.

Mignog was one of the most frequent contributors to the Collusion E-zine.

== Career ==
Tex Mignog co-founded Collusion Syndicate and contributed to its projects, including AnonyMailer, irQconflict, Virtual sit-ins, and Electric Dog.

== Band ==
The punk rock band TexorcisT (1993-1997) was led by Mignog.
