= Viktor Fainberg =

Soviet dissident (1931–2023)

- Виктор Файнберг
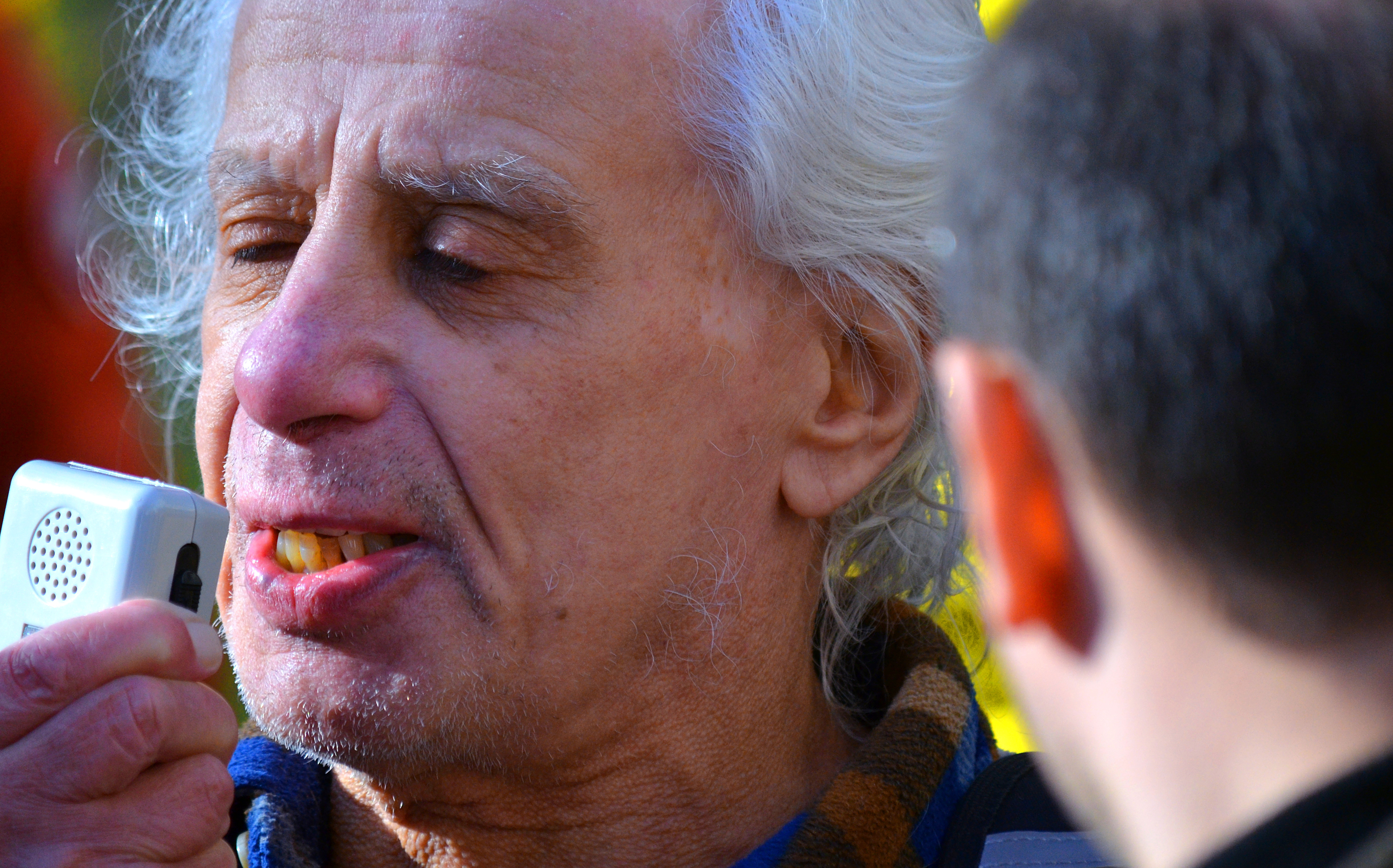
- Fainberg in 2014
- Born: 26 November 1931; Kharkiv, Ukrainian SSR, USSR
- Died: 2 January 2023 (aged 91)
- Citizenship: Russian, French
- Education: Leningrad University
- Occupations: Philology, politics
- Known for: Participation in the dissident movement in the Soviet Union, the 1968 Red Square demonstration and the Campaign Against Psychiatric Abuse which led the struggle against political abuse of psychiatry in the Soviet Union
- Movement: Dissident movement in the Soviet Union
- Partner: Marina Voikhanskaya
- Children: Yuri
- Parent(s): Isaac Fainberg and Sarah Dashevskaya
- Awards: Medal of the President of the Slovak republic

Viktor Isaakovich Fainberg (Russian: Виктор Исаакович Файнберг; 26 November 1931 – 2 January 2023) was a Russian philologist, prominent figure of the dissident movement in the Soviet Union, participant of the 1968 Red Square demonstration, and the director of the Campaign Against Psychiatric Abuse.

== Biography ==
Viktor Fainberg was born to the married couple of Isaac Fainberg and Sarah Dashevskaya. While attending school during an antisemitic campaign of 1948-1952, he was subjected to harassment that, in his own words, he did not reconcile himself to, but entered the fray with an abuser. As the result of these frays, he got a referral to a psychiatrist.

In 1957, in connection with antisemitic insult, he had a fight with a policeman and for this reason was sentenced to 1 year of corrective labor.

In 1968, he graduated from the English unit of the philological department of Leningrad University where he defended his diploma thesis about writer Salinger with distinction. In the summer of 1968, Fainberg worked as a guide at Pavlovsk Palace.

Fainberg was one of the seven persons who participated in the 1968 Red Square demonstration against the Soviet-led military invasion of Czechoslovakia. During the demonstration and his arrest, he lost many teeth and in this unpresentable state was never presented for trial; instead, he was placed to a psychiatric hospital.

Fainberg was examined by the Serbsky Institute commission composed of G.V. Morozov, D.R. Lunts and Y.L. Lindau. In their act No 35 / s dated 10 October 1968, they did not mention the invasion of Czechoslovakia, which gave rise to this demonstration, the action was merely described as 'disorderly conduct at Red Square,' and Fainberg's mental condition was described as follows:

With enthusiasm and strong obsession he expresses ideas of reformism as to Marxism classics' teaching, while revealing clearly his increased self-esteem and firm belief in his rightness. At the same time, his remarks about his family, parents, and son reveal his emotional flatness... In the Institute department, one can note his unconcern, indifference to himself and others in his outwardly orderly behavior. He is occupied with gymnastics, rubdown, reading books, and studying literature in English. His insight into his condition and the emerged situation is clearly insufficient.

As a result, he was committed for compulsory treatment to the Special Psychiatric Hospital in Leningrad where he was confined from January 1969 to February 1973.

At the hospital, Fainberg went on hunger strike in protest, was subjected to forced feeding and was treated with chlorpromazine despite his hyperthyroidism that was somatic contraindication to chlorpromazine therapy.

Marina Voikhanskaya, a psychiatrist at the hospital, assisted Fainberg by passing information about him to dissidents outside. She was demoted for this activity which helped Fainberg be released. In 1974, Fainberg emigrated from the Soviet Union to Israel, and Marina Voikhanskaya emigrated to the UK in 1975.

In emigration, Fainberg initiated the formation of "Campaign Against Psychiatric Abuses" (CAPA) to fight punitive psychiatry in the USSR. In 1983, the Soviet Union was expelled from the World Psychiatric Association (WPA).

Fainberg died on 2 January 2023, at the age of 91.

== Other ==
On 27 October 2014, along with other three dissenters from summer of 1968, Fainberg was decorated by Slovak President Andrej Kiska for his show of solidarity to Czechoslovakia. He received the Medal of the President of the Slovak republic along with Vladimir Dremlyuga and Pavel Litvinov. Natalya Gorbanevskaya received the highest Slovak award, Order of the White Double Cross, in memoriam.

British playwright Tom Stoppard wrote the play Every Good Boy Deserves Favour dedicated to Vladimir Bukovsky and Viktor Fainberg.

Fainberg has a daughter, Sarah, who is a research fellow at the Institute for National Security Studies in Tel Aviv.

== Sources ==
- Victor Fainberg entries (1968-1976), CCE Name Index
- Хроника текущих событий
- ВИКТОР ФАЙНБЕРГ: ДВА ГОДА, 30 ЛЕТ И ПОКУШЕНИЕ
- Горбаневская Н. «Герои или безумцы?»
- Пшизов В. Синдром замкнутого пространства (Записки судебного психиатра)
- Интервью Файнберга Международному французскому радио
- Fainberg, Victor (1975). "My five years in mental hospitals". Index on Censorship. 4 (2): 67–71. doi:10.1080/03064227508532427. S2CID 143559295.

== Video ==
The Institute for the Study of Totalitarian Regimes videotaped Fainberg's spoken autobiography in Russian:

- Part 1, 39 min on YouTube
- Part 2, 39 min on YouTube
- Part 3, 41 min on YouTube
- Part 4, 38 min on YouTube
- Part 5, 40 min on YouTube
- Part 6, 41 min on YouTube
- Part 7, 39 min on YouTube
- Part 8, 41 min on YouTube

== Interviews ==
- Dmitriev, Sergey [Сергей Дмитриев] (11 June 2014). "Виктор Файнберг о деле Михаила Косенко: "Мы не сумели передать молодым поколениям свой опыт"" [Viktor Fainberg about the case of Mikhail Kosenko, "We failed to share with young generations our experience"] (in Russian). Radio France Internationale.
- Makeyeva, Mariya [Мария Макеева] (9 October 2013). "Виктор Файнберг, основатель движения борьбы с карательной психиатрией: нет ничего хуже психушки, укол – и ты чувствуешь, как из тебя вытекает разум и душа" [Viktor Fainberg, the founder of the movement for the struggle against punitive psychiatry: There is nothing worse than psikhushka, after injection you feel how your reason and soul comes out of you] (in Russian). TV Rain.
- Prokhazkova, Petra [Petra Procházková] (27 June 2015). "Protestoval proti invazi Sovětů. Rus strpí krutost, ale ne slabost, říká jeden z 'osmi statečných'" [He protested against the Soviet invasion. Russian man would tolerate cruelty but not weakness, says one of the eight brave]. Lidovky (in Czech).
- Prokhazkova, Petra [Петра Прохазкова] (1 July 2015). "Русский стерпит жестокость, но не слабость" [Russian man would tolerate cruelty but not weakness] (in Russian). inoSMI. Archived from the original on 4 March 2016.
