= Lightbeam (software) =

Mozilla Firefox browser add-on

- Release: 2011
- Stable release: 3.4.0 / 1 May 2026
- Type: Mozilla extension
- License: MPL 2.0
- Website: https://lightbeam.chikl.de
- Repository: https://codeberg.org/chikl/Lightbeam

Lightbeam (called Collusion in its experimental version) was an add-on for Firefox that displays third party tracking cookies placed on the user's computer while visiting various websites. It displays a graph of the interactions and connections of sites visited and the tracking sites to which they provide information.

== Functionality ==
Once installed and enabled, Lightbeam records all tracking cookies saved on the user's computer through the Firefox browser by the various sites that the user visits. It differentiates between "behavioural" tracking cookies (those which record specific actions on a site) and other tracking cookies. At any time during a browsing session the user can open a separate tab, using the "Show Lightbeam" option of Tools, to display a graph of sites visited and cookies placed. This will show when a given cookie is used by multiple sites, thus enabling those sites to track the user from site to site. Lightbeam will also allow the user to see which advertisers or other third parties are connected to which cookies, and thus can develop information about the user's browsing from site to site.

Mozilla emphasizes that it displays its data in real time.

According to Mozilla, all data collected by Lightbeam is stored locally, and is not shared with anyone, unless the user intentionally exports the data and shares it manually. Future versions may include provisions to reject or delete tracking cookies as well as monitoring them.

== TED presentation ==
Gary Kovacs, CEO of Mozilla, presented Collusion in a TED talk (Technology, Entertainment, Design) in early 2012.

"Collusion will allow us to pull back the curtain and provide users with more information about the growing role of third parties, how data drives most Web experiences, and ultimately how little control we have over that experience and our loss of data." Kovacs wrote in a Mozilla blog post about the TED talk.

== Reactions ==
Writing for ExtremeTech, Sebastian Anthony found the tracking connections revealed by Collusion to be "quite astonishing". He went on to say that: "Now, you can either use Collusion to shock and appall yourself, or you can use it to show friends and family just how rampant behavioral tracking is. Once your mother sees that no less than five companies track her behavior when she visits MSNBC.com, and six when she visits FoxNews.com, she might be a little more cautious."

"Ms Smith" finds the results of Collusion to be "jaw dropping".

Stephen C. Webster, writing for The Raw Story wrote of the information provided by Collusion: "While it doesn’t sound all that creepy, just wait until you see your own graph. A brief test-run by Raw Story revealed that after clicking a number of popular websites — like Comedy Central, Netflix, Hulu, the Conan O’Brien show, Amazon, The New York Times and others — more than three dozen organizations were tracking our movements across multiple websites."

== History and plans ==
Collusion was originally developed by Atul Varma, a Mozilla engineer, as an independent project. It was later adopted as a Mozilla project.

Mozilla had announced that they would be continuing the development of Collusion with support from the Ford Foundation in 2012. However, beginning in October 2019, they ended official support in favour of built in Enhanced Tracking Protection in Firefox.
