= Collusion (psychology) =

Behavioral pattern in relationships

The concept of collusion in couples' relations with two partners is a psychological term for behavioral patterns in relationships for couples therapy. In contemporary psychotherapeutical practice, collusion often refers to a failure of the therapist to maintain neutrality or objectivity, such as when the therapist aligns too closely with a client's distorted perspectives or defenses. It highlights the importance of self-awareness and reflective practice for the therapist.

== Introduction ==
Karl Jaspers introduced ideas relevant to collusion in his seminal work General Psychopathology (Allgemeine Psychopathologie), first published in 1913. However, Jaspers did not use the term "collusion" explicitly in the way it is commonly understood today. Instead, his work laid the groundwork for understanding interpersonal dynamics and the therapist's influence on the therapeutic relationship.

The term "collusion" in psychotherapy was first introduced by Sándor Ferenczi in 1933. He described collusion as an unconscious process linking the transference reactions of the patient with the countertransference reactions of clinicians, leading to specific and often complex dynamics in the therapeutic relationship.

Later, in 1967, Henry V. Dicks expanded on this concept in his work Marital Tensions, where he explored collusion within marital relationships. Dicks defined collusion as an unconscious, unresolved issue shared by two or more participants, who become interlocked in a defensive maneuver.

In 1975, Jürg Willi further explored the concept in his book The Dyadic Relationship (Die Zweierbeziehung). In this book he introduces his concept of collusion. He interprets collusion to be the unconscious interaction between partners. He delivers an overview of classical phases of two partner couples' relationships. The book is centered around the avoidance of conflicts in these phases. The avoidance is triggering the emergence of collusions. The author understands conflicts of couples as joint neurotic disturbance of the conflict parties. Not every couples' conflict is a collusion, but every destructive attempt of clarification can lead to a collusion. The suggested collusion concept tries to unite different therapy schools in a single theory. He combines different aspects of psychoanalytical (Psychoanalysis), family therapeutic (Family therapy) and communication therapeutic methods. He derives four collusion patterns:

- Love as to be one in the narcissistic collusion.
- Love as caring for each other in the oral collusion.
- Love as totally belonging to each other in the anal-sadistic collusion.
- Love as test of masculinity in the phallic-oedipal collusion.

The author understands the dyad as a half-open system and describes the function of third persons in the collusion conflict. For the advancement of a couple, relationships with third persons are necessary. The author restricts himself to considering only those forms, that contribute to not carry out a conflict. He describes different the roles, third persons can take and their effect on the couples' dynamic. Furthermore, he considers psychosomatic couple illness and their consequences for the collusion. A psychosomatic illness has a similar meaning as a third person. Finally, the author describes therapeutic aspects of couples therapy and their effect and application of the collusion concept. A complex topic, which itself fills a second book „Therapie der Zweierbeziehung“.

== Narcissistic collusion ==
Ideally the relationship of a narcissistic collusion presents as follows: Partner A, mostly the male, shows himself grandiose, his partner (complementary narcissistic) reacts adoringly. She herself feels small and not worthy of love, she is fixated on him or a third person and presents herself unobtrusive, with a tendency to self-destructive behavior, for example overloading or drug use. He sees her as a decorative part of himself, she seeks a substitute self in him. He represses thereby, that he identifies with a foreign determined replacement self, she represses her claim of an own ideal self.

== Oral collusion ==
In the oral collusion one partner takes the role of the caretaker and one partner takes the role of the fosterling. Because the couple is committed to their roles, the conflict develops, where the caretaker perceives the fosterling to be insatiable and ungrateful and the caretaker is perceived accusing and dismissive by the fosterling. The fosterling often reacts depressive. Basically, both partners agree, that the meaning of love is to take care of each other. Their joint resistance, the common fear directs against the idea, that the fosterling must take nursing tasks towards the caretaker. Counseling can help the couple to practice their roles and to reflect experiences and resistances.

== Anal-sadistic collusion ==
Both partners have the common resistance against the idea, to question that the relationship would break, if both partners behaved freely and autonomously. This leads to power struggles, sadomasochism, and jealousy-infidelity patterns. These actions serve the purpose, of secure bonding and being related to each other.

== Phallic-oedipal collusion ==
From a psychological point of view every human goes through a complex developing process as a small child, that leads to a sexual identity as boy or girl. Background for the phallic-oedipal collusion of couples are the difficulties, that can arise throughout this process. If the theme of the marriage is the search for confirmation, then most likely both partners have an unresolved relationship to their opposite sex parent and did not have a model in the same sex parent.

In the phallic collusion the male partner follows inflated male claims, while he stays passive-reserved. The frequency and the shaping of sexual encounters are entrusted with the female partner. Not uncommonly there is no sex at all. As a compensation the male partner seek confirmation for example in extreme or dangerous sports. The female partner delegates responsibility and initiative to him, but does not have to be afraid of male expectations from his side.

The mating choice in the oedipal collusion is more directly tied to the opposite sex parent. Often a much older partner is chosen and sometimes the son stays with the mother, or the daughter stays with the father. Sometimes a partner is chosen, who is completely unlike the opposite sex parent, to avoid the tight connectedness from childhood. Humans in deep oedipal entanglement tend to invade the marriages of other humans.

== Sources ==
- Willi, Jürg (2011). Die Zweierbeziehung (in German). Rowohlt. ISBN 978-3-499-62758-3.
- Pritz, Alfred (2008). Einhundert Meisterwerke der Psychotherapie (in German). Springer Verlag. ISBN 978-3-211-25214-7.
- Bergmann, Günther (2010). "Kollusionen in der Partnerschaft" (PDF). www.elf-porz.de (in German). Katholische Beratungsstelle für Ehe-, Familien- und Lebensfragen Friedrich - Ebert - Ufer 54 51143 Köln.
- Willi, Jurg (May 1996). Couples in Collusion. Rowman & Littlefield Publishers, Incorporated. ISBN 9781568218427.
- Willi, Jürg (1996). Couples in Collusion. Rowman & Littlefield Publishers, Incorporated. ISBN 978-1568218427.
- Stiefel, Friedrich; Nakamura, Kenji; Terui, Takeshi; Ishitani, Kunihiko (2017). "Collusions Between Patients and Clinicians in End-of-Life Care: Why Clarity Matters". Journal of Pain and Symptom Management. 53 (4): 776–782. doi:10.1016/j.jpainsymman.2016.11.011. PMID 28062352.
