= Collusion Syndicate =

US defunct special interest group

The Collusion Syndicate, formerly the Collusion Group and sometimes spelled Collu5ion, C0llu5i0n or C011u5i0n, was a Computer Security and Internet Politics Special Interest Group (SIG) founded in 1995 and effectively disbanded around 2002.

== Collusion Group ==
The Collusion Group was founded in 1995 by technologist Tex Mignog, a.k.a. the TexorcisT (sic) in Dallas, Texas before moving the headquarters to Austin, Texas in 1997. Founding members included individuals that all operated anonymously using hacker pseudonyms (called "handles" or "nyms") including the TexorcisT, Progress, Sfear (sic), Anormal, StripE (sic) and Elvirus. The membership of this organization grew to an estimated 30+ by 1999 and was not localized to its headquarters in Austin, Texas, with members in other states, countries and continents. The group made numerous open appearances at computer security events such as H.O.P.E. and DefCon and was often quoted by the media on computer related security, political and cultural issues.

The group was well known for its online publication, www.Collusion.org and also founded and financed other events such as the "irQconflict", the largest seasonal computer gaming tournament in the South-Central US.

The group was often interviewed with regard to Internet security issues by reporters for a variety of media outlets, some examples being KVUE News , the Austin American Statesman and Washington Post , and The New York Times .

== www.Collusion.org ==
The Collusion Syndicate began publishing articles written by its members and others that submitted articles in 1997 on their site, www.Collusion.org, their stated mission being to "Learn all that is Learnable". This site won awards including a Best of Austin in 2000 by the Austin Chronicle where the site was described as "an edgy cabal of net-savvy punks and vinyl-scratching, video-gaming malcontents, laying it down in no uncertain terms with a lot of dark backgrounds and urban-toothed graphics and in-your-face-yo rants."

Collusion Syndicate research on SIPRNet has been referenced by the SANS Institute .

Xchicago has published tips by Collusion's founder, TexorcisT, on Google Hacking.

The group's work and research is referenced in many books including Steal This Computer Book 4.0: What They Won't Tell You about the Internet, Mac OS X Maximum Security and Anarchitexts: Voices from the Global Digital Resistance.

The group may have been tied to Assassination Politics as evidenced by declassified documents.

== Notable Inventions and Actions ==
=== AnonyMailer ===
1995 - An application developed to point out security issues with the Simple Mail Transfer Protocol.

=== Port-A-LAN ===
1998 - The Port-A-LAN is described as a "LAN-in-a-Box" and designed to facilitate quick network deployments. With Cat 3 50-pin telco cable and break-out "harmonicas" to quickly deploy a 160 node network at a previously unwired location in less than one hour. (Developed prior to the advent of WiFi popularity.)

=== irQconflict ===
1998-2001 - The Collusion Syndicate hosted the irQconflict , the largest seasonal computer gaming tournament in the South-Central US. These events were different in that they were very large for LAN party standards (100-200 gamers) and included a rave like atmosphere with DJs, club lighting and projectors showing computer animation and machinima. They took place in various venues in Austin, Texas, utilized Port-A-LAN technology and, due to its size, required the re-engineering of the venues' electrical wiring. These events drew attendance from all over Texas and surrounding states. The Collusion Group took the show on the road in 1999, taking the irQconflict to DefCon 7 and in 2000 was invited to do their thing in conjunction with SXSW Interactive and COnduit 2K electronic film festival and was where some machinima films chose to debut , during the gaming.

=== Virtual Sit-ins ===
1999 - The Collusion Syndicate promoted Virtual Sit-ins which are manual DDoS attacks created by hundreds of protesters attempting to overload the servers of the organization they are protesting by repeatedly requesting data, manually. SecurityTraq credits this site as providing an early introduction to the concept of Hacktivism and they are referenced in The Internet and Democracy, a paper by Roger Clarke Prepared for IPAA/NOIE and included in a NOIE publication in September 2004. They explanation of Hactivism was published in the Hacktivist and credited in the Ashville Global Report as lately as 2007.

=== Electric Dog ===
2000 - The Electric Dog is a remote control wireless camera robot created to demonstrate the practicality of simple robotics in routine office technical repair.

== See also ==
- 2600 The Hacker Quarterly
- Phrack
- Legion of Doom
- Chaos Computer Club
- Cult of the Dead Cow
- l0pht
- Crypto-anarchism
- Culture jamming
- E-democracy
- Hacker culture
- Hacker ethic
- Internet activism
