= Collision (band) =

Collision, 1992

Collision was an American heavy metal band from New York City that formed in 1979. Playing in relative obscurity for nearly 13 years, they were signed by Chaos/Columbia after they heard one of the band's demos. The band then released their first full-length album entitled Collision in 1992. In 1995, they released their second and last full-length album, Coarse, with Sony Music Distributing.

== Members ==
- Nik Chinboukas (vocals/guitar)
- Gustavo J. Vitureira (bass)
- Alex Kyriazis (drums)

== Discography ==
=== Studio albums ===
- Collision (1992)
- Coarse (1995)
