= Yuri Orlov =

Soviet physicist and dissident (1924–2020)

Yuri Fyodorovich Orlov
- Юрий Фёдорович Орлов
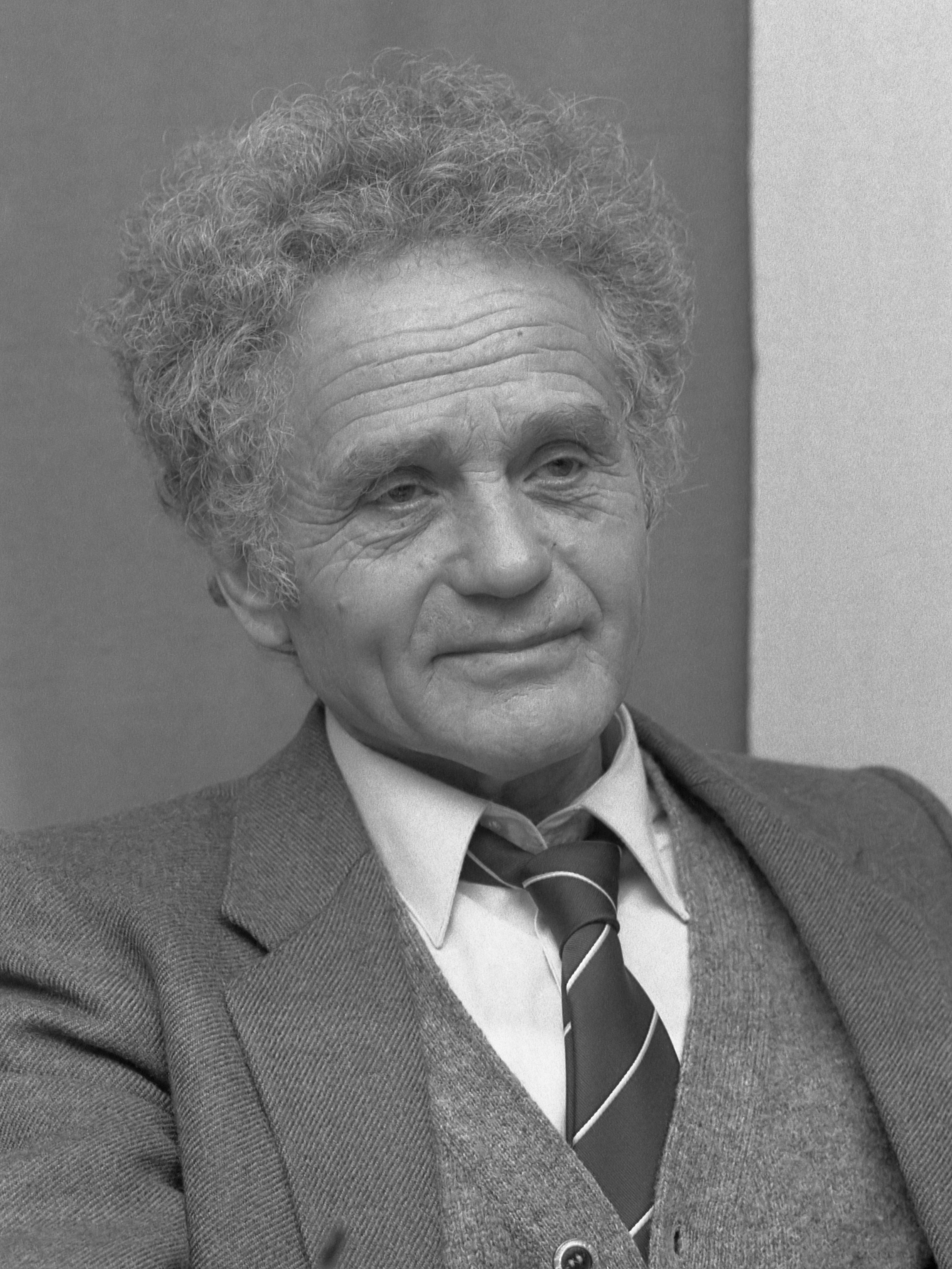
- Orlov in 1986
- Born: 13 August 1924; Moscow, Russian SFSR, Soviet Union
- Died: 27 September 2020 (aged 96); Ithaca, New York, U.S.
- Citizenship: Soviet Union (1924–1986); Stateless (1986–1990); Soviet Union (1990–1991); Stateless (1991–1993); United States (1993–2020)
- Education: Moscow State University, Institute for Theoretical and Experimental Physics
- Known for: his scientific work and participation in human rights movement in the Soviet Union
- Spouses: Galina Papkevich; Irina Lagunova; Irina Valitova; Sidney Orlov
- Children: sons Dmitri, Aleksandr, Lev
- Awards: Carter-Menil Human Rights Prize (1986), honorary doctorate Uppsala University (1990) Nicholson Medal for Humanitarian Service (1995), Andrei Sakharov Prize (APS) (2006), Robert R. Wilson Prize for Achievement in the Physics of Particle Accelerators American Physical Society (2020)
- Scientific career
- Fields: Accelerator physics, Nuclear physics
- Workplaces: Institute for Theoretical and Experimental Physics; Yerevan Physics Institute; Institute of Terrestrial Magnetism and Propagation of Radio Waves; Cornell University; American Academy of Arts and Sciences; Soviet section of Amnesty International; Moscow Helsinki Group
- Orlov's voice Recorded 11 May 2011 during an interview for Ekho Moskvy

Yuri Fyodorovich Orlov (Russian: Ю́рий Фёдорович Орло́в, 13 August 1924 – 27 September 2020) was a particle accelerator physicist, human rights activist, Soviet dissident, founder of the Moscow Helsinki Group, a founding member of the Soviet Amnesty International group. While serving nine years in prison and internal exile for monitoring the Helsinki human rights accords, he was declared a prisoner of conscience by Amnesty International as a founder of the human rights movement in the Soviet Union. Following his release from exile, Orlov was allowed to emigrate to the U.S. and became a professor of physics at Cornell University.

== Early career ==
Yuri Orlov was born into a working-class family on 13 August 1924 and grew up in a village near Moscow. His parents were Klavdiya Petrovna Lebedeva and Fyodor Pavlovich Orlov. In March 1933, his father died.

From 1944 to 1946, Orlov served as an officer in the Soviet army. In 1952, he graduated from the Moscow State University and began his postgraduate studies at the Institute for Theoretical and Experimental Physics where he later worked as a physicist.

In 1956, Orlov nearly lost his scientist career due to his speech at the party meeting about discussion of the report "On the Personality Cult and its Consequences" by Khrushchev at the 20th Congress of the CPSU. He publicly called Stalin and Beria "killers who were in power" and put forward the requirement of "democracy on the basis of socialism." For his pro-democracy speech in 1956, he was expelled from the Communist Party of the Soviet Union and fired from his job.

What is the meaning of life? That your soul may outlive your remains in something sacred and should escape decay ... I have again looked at, added up, corrected, and sized up what I have been doing during these last years and have seen that this is good ... (Yuri Orlov, 1980)

Orlov obtained the Candidate of Sciences degree in 1958 and the Doctor of Sciences degree in 1963. He became an expert on particle acceleration. In 1968, he was elected a corresponding member of the Armenian Academy of Sciences after he found work at the Yerevan Physics Institute. In 1972, he came back to Moscow and worked at the Institute of Terrestrial Magnetism.

== Dissidence ==
In September 1973, when Pravda published a statement by a group of prominent academics denouncing Andrei Sakharov's anti-patriotic activity, Orlov decided to support him, while recollecting the well memorized spells of the 1930s, in which some academics demanded the death penalty for others already arrested; later some of these academics themselves were arrested, with some academics who were not arrested demanding the death penalty for them.

Defending Sakharov, Orlov on 16 September 1973 wrote "Open Letter to L.I. Brezhnev about the Reasons for the Intellectual Backwardness in the USSR and Proposals to Overcome It" which appeared in underground samizdat circulation. The Western press published the letter in 1974 but publication in the Russian press was only in 1991. In the early 1970s, the article by Yuri Orlov "Is a Non-Totalitarian Type of Socialism Possible?" also appeared in underground samizdat circulation.

In 1973, he was fired after becoming a founding member of the first Amnesty International group in the Soviet Union.

In May 1976, he organized the Moscow Helsinki Group and became its chairman. Andrei Sakharov praised Orlov for systematically documenting Soviet violations of the human rights provisions of the Helsinki Accords. Orlov ignored orders to disband the Moscow Helsinki Group when the KGB told him the group was illegal. The KGB head Yuri Andropov determined, "The need has thus emerged to terminate the actions of Orlov, fellow Helsinki monitor Ginzburg and others once and for all, on the basis of existing law."

== Arrest and trial ==
On 10 February 1977, Orlov was arrested. In March 1977, Orlov published the article about his arrest "The road to my arrest." In a closed trial, he was denied the right to examine evidence and to call witnesses.

The courtroom was filled with some 50 individuals selected by the authorities, while supporters and friends of Orlov, including Andrei Sakharov, were barred from entering because there was no room. Orlov's summation was interrupted many times by the judge and the prosecutor and by spectators who shouted "spy" and "traitor." According to Orlov's wife Irina, hostile spectators in the courtroom applauded the sentence and shouted: "You should have given him more."

Orlov at the trial argued that he has a right to criticize the government and a right to circulate such criticism under the freedom of information provisions of the Helsinki Accords. Orlov also argued that he circulated such information for humanitarian, not subversive, reasons. On 15 May 1978, Orlov was sentenced to seven years of a labor camp and five years internal exile for his work with the Moscow Helsinki Group.

=== Protests over Orlov's trial ===
US President Jimmy Carter expressed his concern over the severity of the sentence and the secrecy of the trial. Washington senator Henry M. Jackson said, "The Orlov trial, and the Ginzburg and Shcharansky incarcerations, are dramatic cases in point" when discussing Soviet breaches of law. The US National Academy of Sciences officially protested against the trial of Orlov.

In the summer of 1978, 2,400 American scientists including physicists at the University of California's Lawrence Berkeley Laboratory created Scientists for Sakharov, Orlov and Shcharansky (SOS), an international movement to promote and protect the human rights of scientists. An initiator of SOS was American physicist Andrew Sessler, its chairman was Prof. Morris Pripstein. Scientists at CERN have spoken out against Orlov's imprisonment for "disseminating anti-Soviet propaganda". 43 physicists have called off Soviet trips to protest his jailing.

== Imprisonment and exile ==
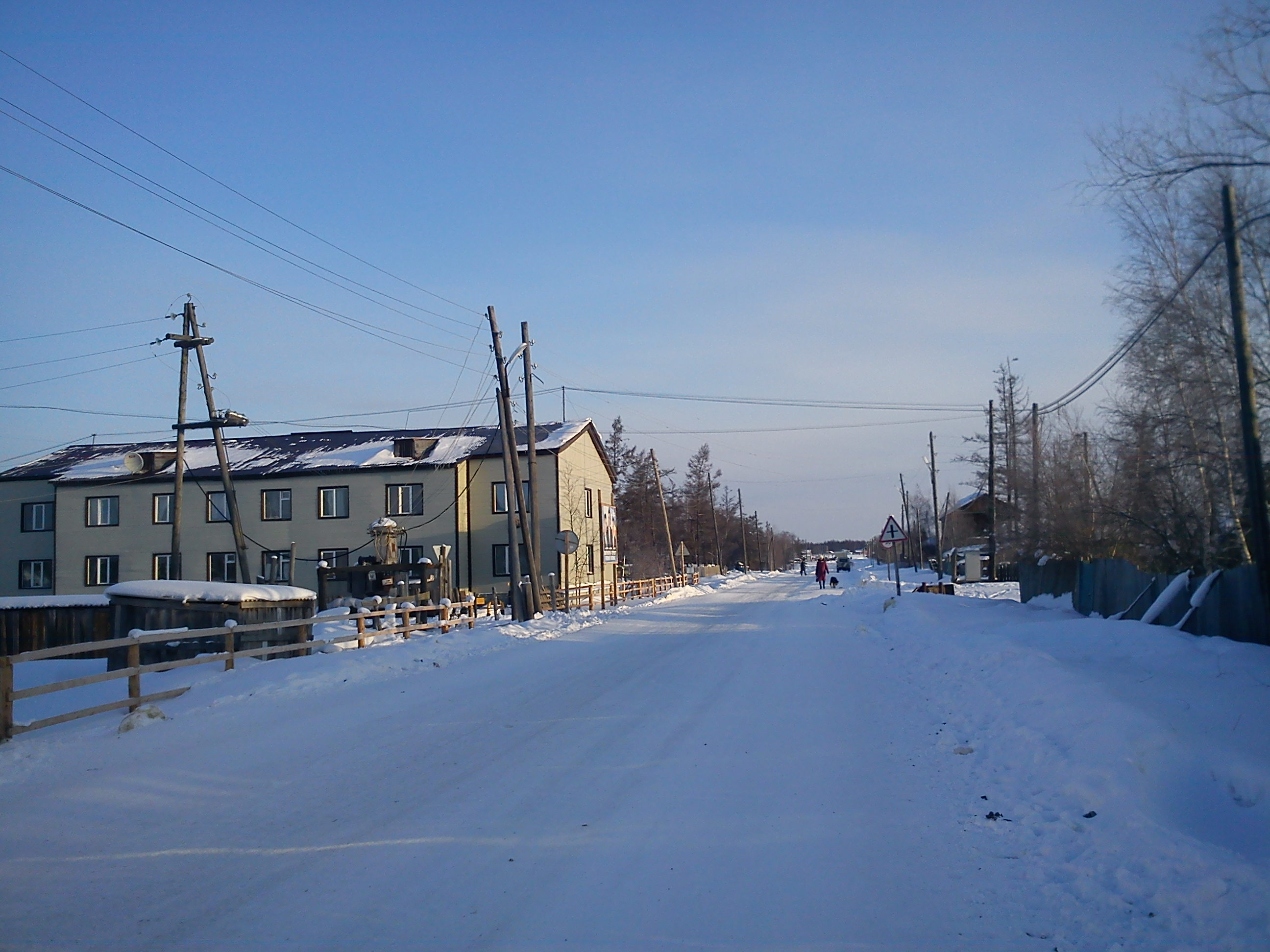
A street in Kobyay

For a year and a half, Orlov was imprisoned in Lefortovo Prison, then Perm Camp 35 and 37. In Perm Camp 37, he mounted three hunger strikes to make the prison authorities return his confiscated writings and notes. Two articles written by him in the camp were smuggled and published abroad. On 5 July 1983, Austrian Chancellor Bruno Kreisky sent the Soviet leader Yuri Andropov a letter asking for his release to Austria, but it was intentionally not answered.

The New York-based Helsinki Watch issued a statement about Orlov's health deterioration, "He has frequent headaches and dizzy spells, resulting from an old skull injury. He suffers from kidney and prostate inflammation, low blood pressure, rheumatic pains, toothaches, insomnia and vitamin deficiency. Medical care in the labor camp is extremely inadequate." Orlov suffered from tuberculosis. He lost a good deal of weight and most of his teeth. Orlov's wife said he looked emaciated and that she was "very fearful for my husband's health. The authorities are gradually killing him."

In 1984, Orlov was exiled to Kobyay in Siberia and was allowed to buy a house with a garden. On 14 November 1985, Professor George Wald raised the case of Orlov in a talk with the Soviet leader Mikhail Gorbachev who answered he had not heard of Orlov.

== Deportation and US citizenship ==
On 30 September 1986, the KGB proposed to expel Orlov from the Soviet Union after depriving him of his Soviet citizenship and met with approval from the Central Committee of the Communist Party of the Soviet Union. Orlov's discharge from Siberian exile was part of the U.S.–Soviet deal to release journalist Nicholas Daniloff. Orlov's release from exile and expulsion from the USSR lifted hopes among Westerners that the Helsinki process might finally start yielding progress. Former US President Jimmy Carter said, "As for Orlov, we're very delighted with this happy occurrence. We would like to meet with him if he comes to this country, but I don't know that he will. I have no way of knowing his plans."

On 10 December 1986, Orlov was awarded the Carter–Menil Human Rights Prize of $100,000. In 1987, Orlov began work at Cornell University as a scientist and professor. Orlov was a visiting fellow at the European Organization for Nuclear Research (CERN) in 1988/89. A member of the American Academy of Arts and Sciences, Orlov studied particle accelerator design, beam interaction analysis and quantum mechanics. He authored and co-authored numerous research papers, articles on human rights, and an autobiography, Dangerous Thoughts (1991).

In 1990, Gorbachev restored Soviet citizenship to Orlov and other 23 prominent exiles and emigres who lost the right in the period from 1966 to 1988. Orlov told Gorbachev, "I would say you have a very great power in your hands, the K.G.B., and you should therefore carry out your reforms without fearing anyone at all. Afterward, you should liquidate the K.G.B., because it is a cancer." On 18 July 1991, Orlov and Elena Bonner wrote an open letter about the fact that the Soviet Army and special troops have been systematically deporting thousands of Armenians from Azerbaijan to Armenia.

In 1993, Orlov received American citizenship.

In 1995, the American Physical Society awarded him the Nicholson Medal for Humanitarian Service. In 2005, he was named the first recipient of the Andrei Sakharov Prize, awarded biennially by the American Physical Society to honor scientists for exceptional work in promoting human rights. In 2020, a few days before Orlov died, the American Physical Society awarded him the 2021 Robert R. Wilson Prize for Achievement in the Physics of Particle Accelerators for his scientific work and for "embodying the spirit of scientific freedom."

In 2004, Orlov expressed his opinion about Russia and Vladimir Putin by saying, "Russia is flying backwards in time. Putin is like Stalin, and he speaks in the language of the thug, the mafia." On 24 March 2005, Orlov wrote a letter to Putin to express disquiet over the criminal prosecution of Anna Mikhalchuk, Yuri Samodurov, and Ludmila Vasilovskaya in the case concerning the Sakharov Museum exhibition on religion.

Orlov participated in two documentaries about the Soviet dissident movement, They Chose Freedom in 2005, and Parallels, Events, People in 2014. He was a member of the Human Rights Watch Asia Advisory and Academic Freedom Committees, and member of the Honorary 25th Anniversary Committee, Global Rights.

Orlov died on 27 September 2020, aged 96.

== Some publications ==
- Orlov, Yuri (Spring–Summer 1974). "Letter to L.I. Brezhnev". Survey (14): 241–245.
- Orlov, Yuri (March 1977). "The road to my arrest". The New Leader. 60 (6).
- Orlov, Yuri (Spring 1979). "On prisoners in Soviet camps". Survey (24): 67–91.
- Orlov, Yuri (October 1981). "A quantum model of doubt". Annals of the New York Academy of Sciences. 373 (1): 84–92. Bibcode:1981NYASA.373...84O. doi:10.1111/j.1749-6632.1981.tb51134.x. S2CID 86711656.
- Orlov, Yuri (January 1982). "The wave logic of consciousness: a hypothesis". International Journal of Theoretical Physics. 21 (1): 37–53. Bibcode:1982IJTP...21...37O. doi:10.1007/BF01880263. S2CID 121387263.
- "Yury Orlov: I believe in the people". Index on Censorship. 16 (2): 10. 1987. doi:10.1080/03064228708534201.
- Orlov, Yuri; Bethell, Nicholas (May 1987). "Out of the Gulag and into exile". Encounter (26): 48–52.
- Orlov, Yuri (1 October 1988). "Before and after glasnost". Commentary. 86 (4): 24.
- Orlov, Yuri (1988). "The Soviet Union, human rights, and national security". In Corillon, Carol (ed.). Science and human rights. Washington, DC: National Academies Press. pp. 62–67.
- Gottfried, Kurt; Orlov, Yuri (19 December 1989). "A man who would not be silenced: Sakharov: he saw scientific, political and moral realities as one equation, and he died still warning about 'tomorrow'". The Los Angeles Times.
- Bonner, Elena; Orlov, Yuri (18 July 1991). "Armenia: an open letter". The New York Review of Books. 38 (13).
- Orlov, Yuri (1991). Перейти к полной свободе в сфере идей [Passing to full freedom in the area of ideas] (PDF). In Aksyutin, Yuri; Medvedev, Roy (eds.). Л.И. Брежнев: Материалы к биографии [L.I. Brezhnev: Materials to biography] (in Russian). Moscow: Политиздат. pp. 323–328. ISBN 5-250-01721-5.
- Orlov, Yuri (1991). Dangerous Thoughts. Memoirs of a Russian Life. New York: William Morrow and Company. ISBN 978-0-688-10471-9.
- Орлов, Юрий (1992). Опасные мысли: Мемуары из рус. жизни [Dangerous Thoughts. Memoirs of a Russian Life] (in Russian). Moscow: Аргументы и факты. ISBN 978-5852720023.
- Birman, Joseph; Lizhi, Fang; Winick, Herman; Chudnovsky, Eugene; Orlov, Yuri (August 1994). "Science and human rights". Nature. 370 (6491): 592. Bibcode:1994Natur.370..592B. doi:10.1038/370592a0. S2CID 4233365.
- Orlov, Yuri (1997). Возможен ли социализм не тоталитарного типа? [Is a non-totalitarian type of socialism possible?]. In Akhmetiev I.; Kulakov V. (eds.). Самиздат века [Samizdat of the century] (in Russian). Minsk: Полифакт. ISBN 978-5-89356-004-6.
- Orlov, Yuri (2005). Возможен ли социализм не тоталитарного типа? [Is a non-totalitarian type of socialism possible?]. In Igrunov, Vyacheslav (ed.). Антология самиздата. Неподцензурная литература в СССР. 1950–1980-е.: В 3-х томах: т. 3: после 1973 [Anthology of samizdat. Uncensored literature in the USSR. The 1950s–1980s. In 3 volumes. Volume 3. After 1973] (PDF) (in Russian). Moscow: Международный институт гуманитарно-политических исследований. pp. 191–205. ISBN 978-5-89793-034-0. Archived (PDF) from the original on 8 March 2013.

== Video ==
- Natella Boltyanskaya (8 September 2014). "Восемнадцатая серия. Юрий Орлов" [The eighteenth part. Yuri Orlov]. Voice of America (in Russian). Parallels, Events, People.
- Юбилейный вечер Юрия Орлова (Anniversary evening of Yuri Orlov, 19 min, in Russian) on YouTube
