= Vladimir Bukovsky =

Russian-British human rights activist (1942–2019)

- Владимир Буковский
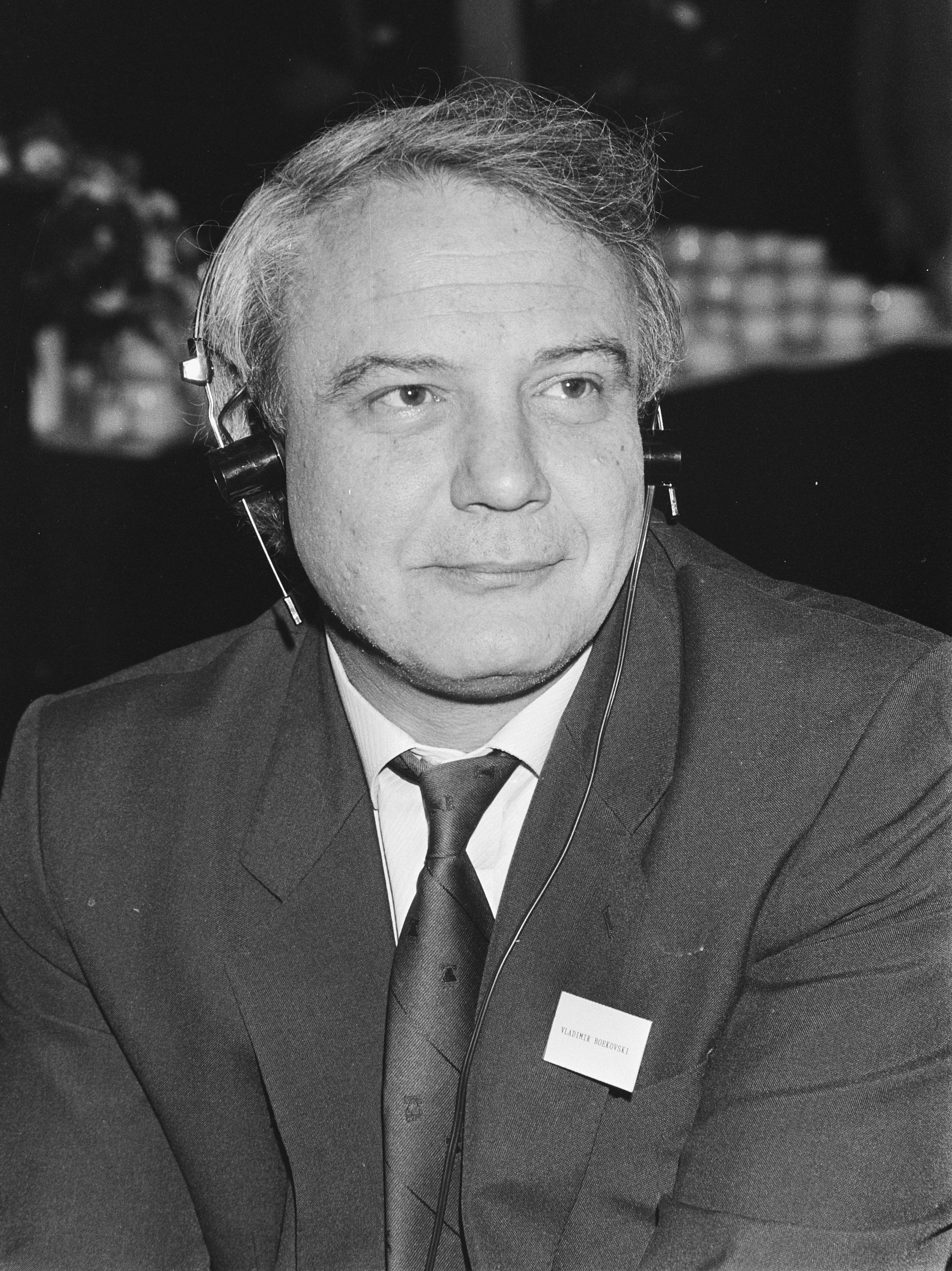
- Bukovsky at the Sakharov Congress in Amsterdam, 21 May 1987
- Born: 30 December 1942; Belebey, Bashkir ASSR, Soviet Union
- Died: 27 October 2019 (aged 76); Cambridge, England
- Citizenship: Soviet Union (until 1992); Russia (1992–2014); United Kingdom (from 1976)
- Education: University of Cambridge, Stanford University
- Occupations: Human right activist, writer, neurophysiologist
- Known for: Human rights activism with participation in the Mayakovsky Square poetry readings, the Campaign Against Psychiatric Abuse and struggle against political abuse of psychiatry in the Soviet Union, Victims of Communism Memorial Foundation, The Freedom Association
- Movement: Dissident movement in the Soviet Union, Solidarnost (Russia)
- Awards: The Thomas S. Szasz Award for Outstanding Contributions to the Cause of Civil Liberties, Truman-Reagan Medal of Freedom
- Website: vladimirbukovsky.com

Vladimir Konstantinovich Bukovsky (Russian: Владимир Константинович Буковский; 30 December 1942 – 27 October 2019) was a Soviet and Russian human rights activist and writer. From the late 1950s to the mid-1970s, he was a prominent figure in the Soviet dissident movement, well known at home and abroad. He spent a total of twelve years in the psychiatric prison-hospitals, labour camps, and prisons of the Soviet Union during Brezhnev's rule.

After being expelled from the Soviet Union in late 1976, Bukovsky remained in vocal opposition to the Soviet system and the shortcomings of its successor regimes in Russia. An activist, a writer, and a neurophysiologist, he is celebrated for his part in the campaign to expose and halt the political abuse of psychiatry in the Soviet Union.

A member of the international advisory council of the Victims of Communism Memorial Foundation, a director of the Gratitude Fund (set up in 1998 to commemorate and support former dissidents), and a member of the International Council of the New York City-based Human Rights Foundation, Bukovsky was a Senior Fellow of the Cato Institute in Washington, D.C. In 2001, Vladimir Bukovsky received the Truman-Reagan Medal of Freedom, awarded annually since 1993 by the Victims of Communism Memorial Foundation.

In 2015, British authorities charged Bukovsky with multiple counts of production and possession of child pornography. He formally denied the charges, filed unsuccessful libel suits related to them, and alleged that Russian hackers had remotely planted the illicit material on his computer, though this possibility was excluded by a court expert. His trial was adjourned several times on grounds of his poor health, and was eventually halted indefinitely, with no verdict or sentencing.

== Early life ==
Vladimir Bukovsky was born to Russian parents in the town of Belebey in the Bashkir Autonomous Soviet Socialist Republic (today the Republic of Bashkortostan in the Russian Federation), to which his family was evacuated during World War II. After the war he and his parents returned to Moscow where his father Konstantin (1908–1976) was a well-known Soviet journalist. During his last year at school Vladimir was expelled for creating and editing an unauthorised magazine. To meet the requirements to apply for a university place he completed his secondary education at evening classes. Bukovsky was enrolled at biology department of Moscow State University, but he was expelled at age 19 for criticizing Soviet state organizations, such as Komsomol.

== Soviet era ==
=== Rallies ===
==== Mayakovsky Square ====
In September 1960, Bukovsky entered Moscow University to study biology. There he and some friends decided to revive the informal Mayakovsky Square poetry readings which began after a statue to the poet was unveiled in central Moscow in 1958. They made contact with earlier participants of the readings such as Vladimir Osipov, the editor of Boomerang (1960), and Yuri Galanskov who issued the Phoenix (1961), two examples of literary samizdat.

It was then that the 19-year-old Bukovsky wrote his critical notes on the Communist Youth League or Komsomol. Later, this text was given the title "Theses on the Collapse of the Komsomol" by the KGB. Bukovsky portrayed the USSR as an "illegal society" facing an acute ideological crisis. The Komsomol was "moribund", he asserted, having lost both moral and spiritual authority, and he called for its democratisation. This text, and his other activities, brought Bukovsky to the attention of the authorities. He was interrogated twice before being thrown out of the university in autumn 1961.

Bukovsky was arrested on 1 June 1963. He was later convicted, in absentia, by reason of his "insanity", under Article 70.1 ("Anti-Soviet agitation and propaganda") of the RSFSR Criminal Code. The official charge was the making and possession of photocopies of anti-Soviet literature, namely two copies of the banned work The New Class by Milovan Djilas. Bukovsky was examined by Soviet psychiatrists, declared to be mentally ill ("sluggish schizophrenia"), and sent for treatment at the Special Psychiatric Hospital in Leningrad where he remained for almost two years, until February 1965. It was there he became acquainted with General Petro Grigorenko, a fellow inmate.

==== The glasnost rally, 5 December 1965 ====
In December 1965, Bukovsky helped prepare a demonstration on Pushkin Square in central Moscow to protest against the trial of the writers Andrei Sinyavsky and Yuli Daniel. He circulated the "Civic Appeal" by mathematician and poet Alexander Esenin-Volpin, which called on the authorities to obey the Soviet laws requiring glasnost in the judicial process, e.g. the admission of the public and the media to any trial. The demonstration on 5 December 1965 (Constitution Day) became known as the Glasnost Meeting or rally, and marked the beginning of the openly active Soviet civil rights movement.

Bukovsky himself was unable to attend. Three days earlier he was arrested, charged with distributing the appeal, and kept in various psikhushkas, among them Hospital No 13 at Lublino, Stolbovaya and the Serbsky Institute, until July 1966.

==== The right to demonstrate, 1967 ====
On 22 January 1967, Bukovsky, Vadim Delaunay, Yevgeny Kushev and Victor Khaustov held another demonstration on Pushkin Square. They were protesting against the recent arrests of Alexander Ginzburg, Yuri Galanskov, Alexei Dobrovolsky and Vera Lashkova (finally prosecuted in January 1968 in the Trial of the Four) and asserting their own right to protest: on 16 September 1966 a new law, Article 190.3, had been introduced which classified any public gatherings or demonstrations as a crime.

On 1 September 1967, at his own trial, Bukovsky used his final words to attack the regime's failure to respect the law or follow legal procedures. He invoked Article 125 of the (still current) 1936 Soviet Constitution to defend the right to organise demonstrations and other public protests. He further suggested that the prosecution had repeatedly failed to observe the revised 1961 Code of Criminal Procedure in its conduct of the case. Bukovsky's final words in court circulated widely in a samizdat collection of such addresses and as part of a collection of materials about the demonstration and subsequent trials compiled by Pavel Litvinov.

Fellow protestors Vadim Delaunay and Yevgeny Kushev admitted regret for their actions but not their guilt; they received suspended sentences and were released. Bukovsky was defiant and, like fellow demonstrator Victor Khaustov (convicted in February 1967), was given three years in an "ordinary regime" corrective-labour camp. Bukovsky was sent to Bor in the Voronezh Region to serve his sentence. He was released in January 1970.

==== The campaign against the abuse of psychiatry ====
In the 1960s and 1970s, the Soviet authorities began the widespread use of psychiatric treatment as a form of punishment and deterrence for the independent-minded. This involved unlimited detention in a psikhushka, as such places were popularly known, which might be conventional psychiatric hospitals or psychiatric prison-hospitals set up (e.g. the Leningrad Special Psychiatric Hospital) as part of an existing penal institution. Healthy individuals were held among mentally ill and often dangerous patients; they were forced to take various psychotropic drugs; they might also be incarcerated in prison-type institutions under overall control of the KGB.

During a clandestine interview filmed by CBS News correspondent Bill Cole in a forest near Moscow, Bukovsky described how the Soviet government was committing political dissidents to mental institutions and subjecting them to drug treatments.

This was a major operation. About twenty of us, Russians and correspondents, went off to the woods outside Moscow, together with wives and children, for a picnic. The KGB kept in the background and watched us from a distance—their main worry was not to miss the moment of our departure. Therefore it was fairly easy for Bill and me to arrange it so that the agents couldn't see him filming the interview. In fact, that was no problem—but smuggling it out was. Bill did two more interviews—with Andrei Amalrik and Pyotr Yakir—and I gave him a taped statement by Ginzburg that had been smuggled out of the Mordovian camps. This considerable package took three months to reach America.

That interview along with interviews with Andrei Amalrik and Pyotr Yakir were smuggled out of the country by Canadian diplomats and aired in 1970 in the CBS News special report "Voices from the Soviet Underground." In 1971, Bukovsky managed to smuggle to the West over 150 pages further documenting the political abuse of psychiatric institutions in the Soviet Union. In a letter addressed to "Western psychiatrists" and written in a deliberately restrained tone, Bukovsky asked them to consider if the evidence justified the isolation of several dissidents, and urged them to discuss the matter at the next International Congress of Psychiatrists.

In recent years in our country a number of court orders have been made involving the placing in psychiatric hospitals ("of special type" and otherwise) of people who in the opinion of their relatives and close friends are mentally healthy. These people are: Grigorenko, Rips, Gorbanevskaya, Novodvorskaya, Ivan Yakhimovich, Vladimir Gershuni, Victor Fainberg, Victor Kuznetsov, Olga Ioffe, Vladimir E. Borisov and others – people well known for their initiative in defence of civil rights in the USSR.

This phenomenon arouses justified anxiety, especially in view of the widely publicized placing of the biologist Zhores Medvedev in a psychiatric hospital by extrajudicial means.

The diagnoses of the psychiatrists who have served as expert witnesses in court, and on whose diagnoses the court orders are based, provoke many doubts as regards their content. However, only specialists in psychiatry can express authoritative opinions about the degree of legitimacy of these diagnoses.

Taking advantage of the fact that I have managed to obtain exact copies of the diagnostic reports made by the forensic-psychiatric groups who examined Grigorenko, Fainberg, Gorbanevskaya, Borisov and Yakhimovich, and also extracts from the diagnosis on V. Kuznetsov, I am sending you these documents, and also various letters and other material which reveal the character of these people. I will be very grateful to you if you can study this material and express your opinion on it.

I realise that at a distance and without the essential clinical information it is very difficult to determine the mental condition of a person and either to diagnose an illness or assert the absence of any illness. Therefore I ask you to express your opinion on only this point: do the above-mentioned diagnoses contain enough scientifically-based evidence not only to indicate the mental illnesses described in the diagnoses, but also to indicate the necessity of isolating these people completely from society?

I will be very happy if you can interest your colleagues in this matter and if you consider it possible to place it on the agenda for discussion at the next International Congress of Psychiatrists.

For a healthy person there is no fate more terrible than indefinite internment in a mental hospital. I believe that you will not remain indifferent to this problem and will devote a portion of your time to it – just as physicists find time to combat the use of the achievements of their science in ways harmful to mankind.

Thanking you in advance,

V. Bukovsky

— Bukovsky's 1971 letter addressed to Western Psychiatrists

The documents were released to the press in March 1971 by a small French group called the International Committee for the Defence of Human Rights. Bukovsky's letter appeared on 12 March in The Times (London) and later in the British Journal of Psychiatry Bukovsky was arrested on 29 March and held in custody for nine months before being put on trial in January 1972.

The information Bukovsky had gathered and sent to the West galvanised human rights activists worldwide and those within the Soviet Union. It also struck a chord among psychiatrists. In September that year 44 European psychiatrists wrote to The Times (London) expressing grave doubts about the diagnoses of the six people concerned. At a meeting in November 1971, the World Federation for Mental Health called on its members to investigate the charges and defend the right to free opinion where it was threatened. These responses were carefully documented by the dissident human rights periodical Chronicle of Current Events, which also recorded the many statements made by Bukovsky's friends and fellow rights activists in his defence. As the person at the centre of this unprecedented international row, Bukovsky waited in almost total isolation, without access to a lawyer, to be tried and sent to the camps or a special psychiatric hospital.

Responding to public pressure, the World Psychiatric Association finally condemned Soviet practices at its Sixth World Congress in 1977 and set up a review committee to monitor misuse. In 1983, the Soviet representatives withdrew from the World Psychiatric Association rather than face expulsion. Bukovsky later characterised this reaction as "the most important victory for the dissident form of glasnost".

=== Final arrest (1971) and imprisonment ===
Following the release of the documents, Bukovsky was denounced in Pravda as a "malicious hooligan, engaged in anti-Soviet activities" and arrested on 29 March 1971. At first held in Lefortovo Prison, in August, Bukovsky spent approximately three months in the Serbsky Institute, which this time pronounced him mentally sound and able to stand trial.

During the trial in January 1972 Bukovsky was accused of slandering Soviet psychiatry, contacts with foreign journalists, and the possession and distribution of samizdat. On this occasion he again used his final words to the court to reach a much wider audience when the text circulated in samizdat. He was sentenced to two years in prison, five in a labour camp, and five more in internal exile. (Note: For reactions in the West and the Soviet Union to the sentence see CCE 24.1 (5 March 1972), "The case of Vladimir Bukovsky". For a KGB profile of Bukovsky, dated 18 May 1972, see: Morozov, Boris (1999). Documents on Soviet Jewish Emigration. London: Frank Cass. pp. 152–154. ISBN 978-0-7146-4911-5.)

While in prison Bukovsky and his fellow inmate, the psychiatrist Semyon Gluzman, wrote a brief 20-page Manual on Psychiatry for Dissidents, which was widely published abroad, in Russian (1975) and in many other languages, including English, French, Italian, German, and Danish. It instructed potential victims of political psychiatry how to behave during interrogation to avoid being diagnosed as mentally ill.

=== Deportation from the USSR (1976) ===
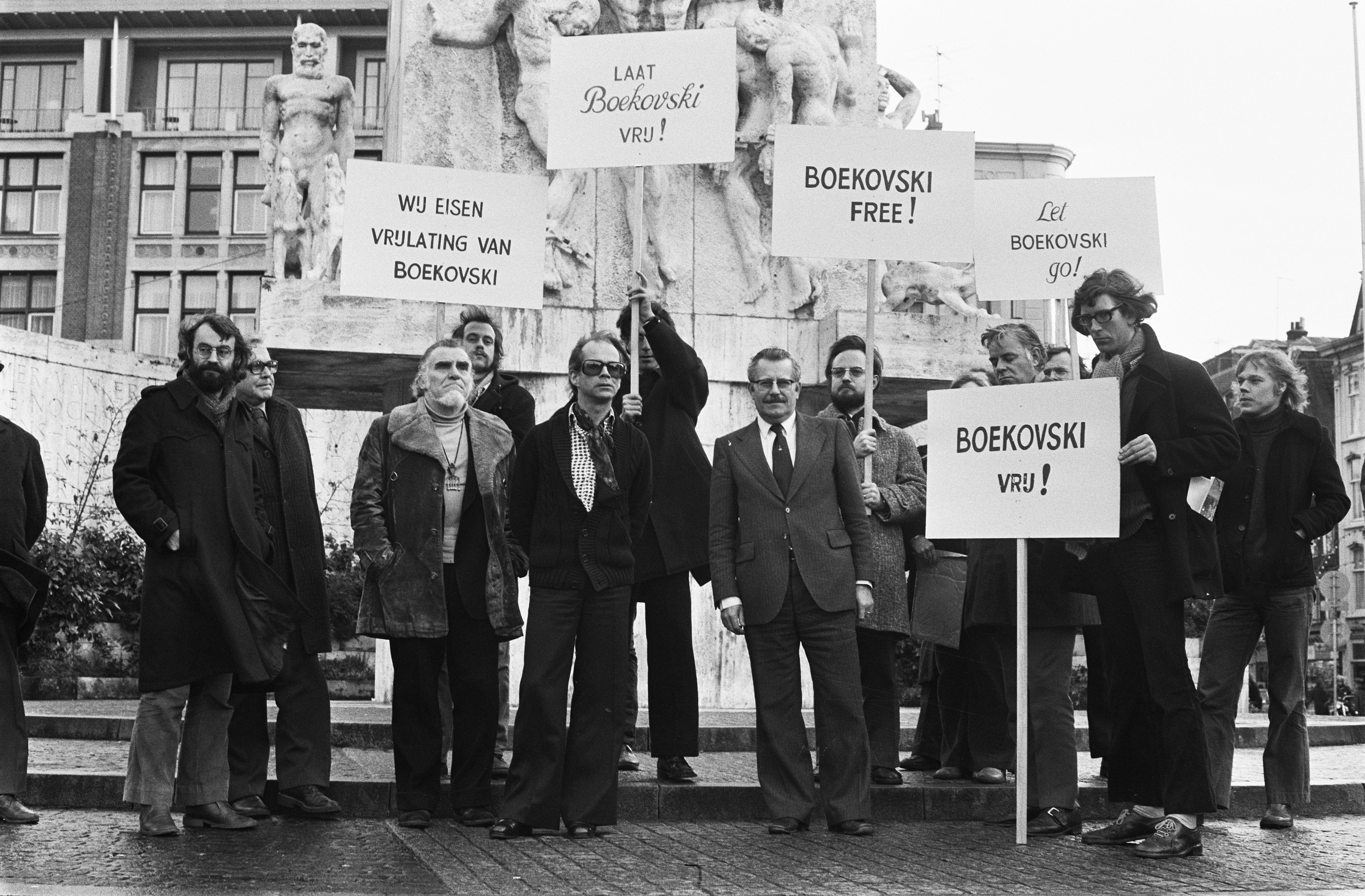
Protest demonstration of January 1975 in Amsterdam for Vladimir Bukovsky's release from prison

The fate of Bukovsky and other political prisoners in the Soviet Union had been repeatedly brought to world attention by Western diplomats and human rights groups such as the relatively new Amnesty International formed in 1961.

In December 1976, Bukovsky was deported from the USSR and exchanged at Zurich Airport by the Soviet government for the imprisoned general secretary of the Communist Party of Chile, Luis Corvalán. In his 1978 autobiography Bukovsky describes how he was brought to Switzerland in handcuffs. The widely publicised exchange increased public awareness in the West about Soviet dissidents. A fellow dissident, Vadim Delaunay wrote an epigram on the occasion about the exchange of "hooligan" Bukovsky:

They exchanged a "hooligan"
For the Luis Corvalan.
What it would be kind of bitch
One could try to Brezhnev switch?"

In March 1977, US President Jimmy Carter met with Bukovsky at the White House. In the USSR the meeting was seen by dissidents and rights activists as a sign of the newly elected president's willingness to stress human rights in his foreign policy; the event provoked harsh criticism by Soviet leaders.

Bukovsky moved to Great Britain where he settled in Cambridge and resumed his studies in biology, disrupted fifteen years earlier (see above) by his expulsion from Moscow University.

==== Life in the West ====
Bukovsky gained a master's degree in Biology at Cambridge University. He also wrote and published To Build a Castle: My Life as a Dissenter (1978). (The title in Russian, And the Wind Returns ..., is a Biblical allusion.) The book was translated into English, French and German. It was published in Russian the following year by Chalidze publishers in New York. Today the Russian original is available online via a number of websites.

After he settled in the West, Bukovsky wrote many essays and polemical articles. These not only criticised the Soviet regime and, later, that of Vladimir Putin, but also exposed "Western gullibility" in the face of Soviet abuses and, in some cases, what he believed to be Western complicity in such crimes. In the late 1970s and early 1980s, following the Soviet invasion of Afghanistan, Bukovsky campaigned with some success for an official UK and US boycott of the summer 1980 Olympics in Moscow. During the same years he voiced concern about the activities and policies of the Western peace movements.

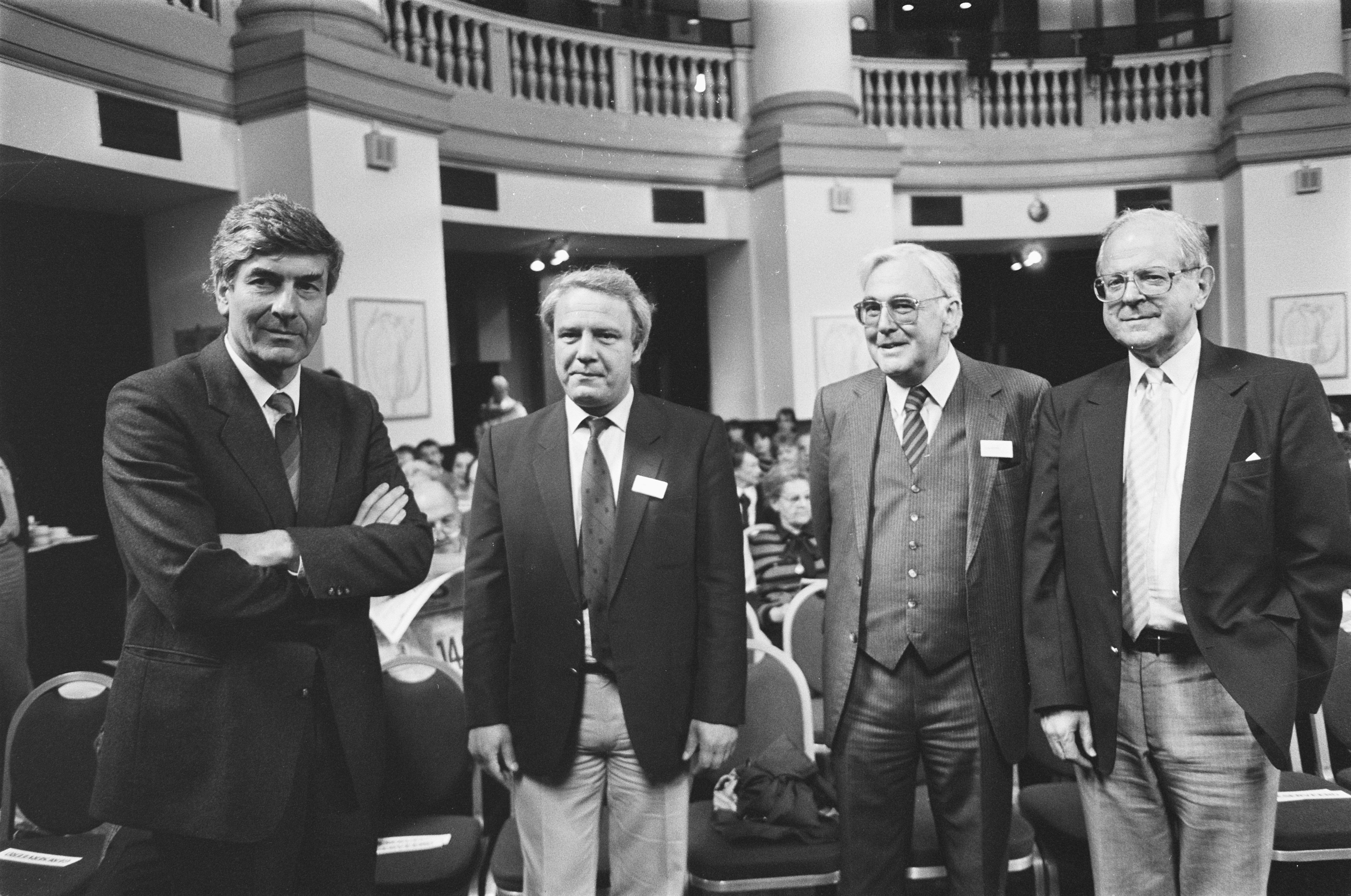
Bukovsky at 5th Sakharov Conference, May 1987, Netherlands: (l. to r.) Prime Minister Lubbers, Vladimir Bukovsky, Professor Bezemer, Professor Robert Conquest

In 1983, together with Cuban dissident Armando Valladares, Bukovsky co-founded and was later elected president of Resistance International. The anti-Communist organisation was run from a small office in Paris by Soviet dissidents and emigres, notably Vladimir Maximov and Eduard Kuznetsov. In 1985 it expanded into the American Foundation for Resistance International. Among the prominent members of the board were Albert Jolis and Jeane Kirkpatrick while Midge Decter, Yuri Yarim-Agaev, Richard Perle, Saul Bellow, Robert Conquest and Martin Colman were on the body's advisory committee. The Foundation aimed to be a co-ordinating centre for dissident and democratic movements seeking to overturn communism in Eastern Europe and elsewhere. It organised protests in the communist countries and in the West, and opposed western financial assistance to communist governments. The Foundation also created the National Council to Support Democratic Movements (National Council for Democracy) with the goal of aiding the emergence of democratic rule-of-law governments, and providing assistance with the writing of constitutions and the formation of civil institutions.

In March 1987, Bukovsky and nine other émigré authors (Ernst Neizvestny, Yury Lyubimov, Vasily Aksyonov and Leonid Plyushch among them) caused a furore in the West and then in the Soviet Union itself when they raised doubts about the substance and sincerity of Mikhail Gorbachev's reforms.

=== Return to the Soviet Union (1991) ===
In April 1991, Vladimir Bukovsky visited Moscow for the first time since his deportation fifteen years before.

In the run-up to the 1991 presidential election, Boris Yeltsin's campaign team included Bukovsky on their list of potential vice-presidential running-mates. In the end, army officer Alexander Rutskoy, a veteran of the 1979–1989 war in Afghanistan and Hero of the Soviet Union was selected. On 5 December 1991, both of Bukovsky's Soviet-era convictions were annulled by a decree of the RSFSR Supreme Court. The following year President Yeltsin formally restored Bukovsky's Russian citizenship: he had never been deprived of his Soviet citizenship, despite deportation from the country.

== Post-Soviet period ==
British and European psychiatrists assessing the documents on psychiatric abuse released by Bukovsky characterised him in 1971: "The information we have about [Vladimir Bukovsky] suggests that he is the sort of person who might be embarrassing to authorities in any country because he seems unwilling to compromise for convenience and personal comfort, and believes in saying what he thinks in situations which he clearly knows could endanger him. But such people often have much to contribute, and deserve considerable respect."

Soon after the collapse of the Soviet Union Vladimir Bukovsky was again out of favour with the Russian authorities. He supported Yeltsin against the Supreme Soviet in the 1993 Russian constitutional crisis in October that year but criticised the new Constitution of Russia approved two months later, as being designed to ensure a continuation of Yeltsin's power. According to Bukovsky, Yeltsin became a hostage of the security agencies from 1994 onwards, and a restoration of KGB rule was inevitable.

=== Judgment in Moscow ===
In 1992, after the dissolution of the Soviet Union, President Yeltsin's government invited Bukovsky to serve as an expert witness at the trial before the Constitutional Court where Russia's communists were suing Yeltsin for banning their Party and taking its property. The respondent's case was that the CPSU itself had been an unconstitutional organisation. To prepare his testimony, Bukovsky requested and was granted access to a large number of documents from the CPSU Central Committee archives (then reorganised into the Central Depository for Contemporary Documentation or TsKhSD). With the help of a small hand-held scanner and a laptop computer, he managed secretly to make photocopies of many of the documents (some with high security clearance), including KGB reports to the Central Committee. The copies were then smuggled to the West.

Bukovsky hoped that an international tribunal in Moscow might play a similar role to the first Nuremberg Trial (1945–1946) in post-Nazi Germany and help the country begin to overcome the legacy of Communism.

It took several years and a team of assistants to piece together the scanned fragments (many only half a page in width) of the hundreds of documents photocopied by Bukovsky and then, in 1999, to make them available online. Many of the same documents were extensively quoted and cited in Bukovsky's Judgment in Moscow (1995), where he described and analysed what he had uncovered about recent Soviet history and about the relations of the USSR and the CPSU with the West.

The book was soon translated into several languages but did not appear in English for over twenty years. Random House bought the rights to the manuscript, but the publisher, in Bukovsky's words, tried to make the author "rewrite the whole book from the liberal left political perspective." Bukovsky resisted, explaining to the Random House editor that he was "allergic to political censorship" because of "certain peculiarities of my biography". (The contract was subsequently cancelled.). Meanwhile, the book was published in French as Jugement à Moscou (1995), in Russian (1996) and in certain other Slavic languages: for a time the Polish edition became a best-seller. In 2016, it was published in Italian, by Spirali, with the title Gli archivi segreti di Mosca. An English language translation did not appear in book form until May 2019, five months before the author died.

On 30 March 2011, Bukovsky requested the arrest of Mikhail Gorbachev by the British authorities after submitting to Westminster Magistrates' Court materials on crimes against humanity that the former Soviet leader had allegedly committed in the late 1980s and early 1990s by ordering military suppression of demonstrations in Lithuania, Tbilisi, Baku and Tajikistan.

=== Potential 1996 presidential candidacy ===
In early 1996, a group of Moscow academics, journalists and intellectuals suggested that Vladimir Bukovsky should run for President of Russia as an alternative candidate to both incumbent President Boris Yeltsin and his main challenger Gennady Zyuganov of the Communist Party of the Russian Federation. However, no formal nomination process was initiated.

=== Memento Gulag ===
In 2001, Bukovsky was elected President of the Comitatus pro Libertatibus – Comitati per le Libertà – Freedom Committees in Florence, an Italian libertarian organisation which promoted an annual Memento Gulag, or Memorial Day devoted to the Victims of Communism, on 7 November (the anniversary of the Bolshevik Revolution). The Memento Gulag has since been held in Rome, Bucharest, Berlin, La Roche sur Yon and Paris.

=== Contacts with Boris Nemtsov and the Russian opposition ===
In 2002, Boris Nemtsov, former Deputy Prime Minister of Russia who was then an elected member of the State Duma and leader of the Union of Rightist Forces, paid a visit to Bukovsky in Cambridge. He wanted to discuss the strategy of the Russian opposition. It was imperative, Bukovsky told Nemtsov, that Russian liberals adopt an uncompromising stand toward what he saw as the authoritarian government of President Vladimir Putin.

In January 2004, with Garry Kasparov, Boris Nemtsov, Vladimir V. Kara-Murza and others, Bukovsky was a co-founder of Committee 2008. This umbrella organisation of the Russian democratic opposition was formed to ensure free and fair elections in 2008 when a successor to Vladimir Putin was elected.

In 2005, Bukovsky was among the prominent dissidents of the 1960s and 1970s (Gorbanevskaya, Sergei Kovalyov, Eduard Kuznetsov, Alexander Podrabinek, Yelena Bonner) who took part in a documentary series by Vladimir Kara-Murza Jr. They Chose Freedom. In 2013 Bukovsky was featured in a documentary series by Natella Boltyanskaya Parallels, Events, People.

In 2009, Bukovsky joined the council of the new Solidarnost coalition which brought together a wide range of extra-parliamentary opposition forces.

=== Criticism of torture in Abu Ghraib prison ===
As revelations mounted about the sanctioned torture of captives in the Guantánamo Bay detention camp, Abu Ghraib and the CIA secret prisons, Bukovsky entered the discussion with an uncompromising attack on the official if covert rationalisation of torture. In an 18 December 2005 op-ed in The Washington Post, Bukovsky recounted his experience under torture in Lefortovo prison in 1971. Once commenced, he warned, the inertia of torture was difficult to control, corrupting those who carried it out. "Torture", he wrote, "has historically been an instrument of oppression—not an instrument of investigation or of intelligence gathering." Bukovsky explained:

Investigation is a subtle process, requiring patience and fine analytical ability, as well as a skill in cultivating one's sources. When torture is condoned, these rare talented people leave the service, having been outstripped by less gifted colleagues with their quick-fix methods, and the service itself degenerates into a playground for sadists.

US President Barack Obama repudiated the Torture Memos on 20 January 2009, two days after taking office.

=== Russian agents in the European Union ===
In EUSSR, a booklet written with Pavel Stroilov and published in 2004, Bukovsky exposed what he saw as the "Soviet roots of European Integration". Two years later, in an interview with The Brussels Journal, Bukovsky said he had read confidential documents from secret Soviet files in 1992 which confirmed the existence of a "conspiracy" to turn the European Union into a socialist organisation. The European Union was a "monster", he argued, and it must be destroyed, the sooner the better, "before it develops into a full-fledged totalitarian state". As an expression of his Eurosceptic position Bukovsky was vice-president of The Freedom Association (TFA) in the United Kingdom.

Ten years earlier, Bukovsky sketched some of the ways in which cooperation was secured. Beyond those who were recruited as Soviet agents and consciously worked for the USSR, as he explained in Judgment in Moscow (1995), there were men and women whom the KGB and GRU classified as "agents of influence" and "confidential contacts":

The majority of these "agents of influence", moreover, were not in a literal sense KGB agents. Some distributed Soviet disinformation for idealistic reasons; others were paying off an old "debt" to the KGB or, on the contrary, expected some new reward or service; others simply did not know what they were doing. ... The examples are endlessly varied.

This applied equally, Bukovsky cautioned, to post-Stalin generations of specialists on the USSR and Eastern Europe. They had been subjected to similar pressures and inducements in the 1970s and 1980s:

The majority of Sovietologists and Slavists, experts on Russia and the Soviet Union, were dependent on the regime for permission to visit the USSR from time to time. A specialist could not secure his place and reputation in the current academic world without that contact: anyone might accuse him of having lost touch and no longer retaining his expertise. The chance to travel to the USSR, however, was closely monitored in those years by the KGB.

=== 2008 presidential candidacy ===
In May 2007, Bukovsky announced his plans to run as candidate for president in the May 2008 Russian presidential election. On 16 December 2007, Bukovsky was officially nominated to run against Dmitry Medvedev and other candidates.

Bukovsky's appeal against exclusion from the presidential race, decision of the Russian Supreme Court, 28 December 2007

The group that nominated Bukovsky as a candidate included Yuri Ryzhov, Vladimir V. Kara-Murza, Alexander Podrabinek, Andrei Piontkovsky, Vladimir Pribylovsky and others. Activists, authors and commentators such as Viktor Shenderovich, Valeriya Novodvorskaya and Lev Rubinstein also favoured Bukovsky.

Responding to pro-Kremlin politicians and commentators who expressed doubt about Bukovsky's electoral prospects, his nominators rejected a number of frequently repeated allegations. In Moscow more than 800 citizens of the Russian Federation nominated Bukovsky for president on 16 December 2007. Bukovsky secured the required number of signatures to register and submitted his application to the Central Election Commission on time, 18 December 2007.

Bukovsky's candidacy received the support of Grigory Yavlinsky, who announced on 14 December 2007 at the Yabloko party conference that he would forgo a campaign of his own and would instead support Bukovsky.

On 22 December 2007, the Central Electoral Commission turned down Bukovsky's application, on the grounds that he had failed to give information about his activities as a writer when submitting his documents, that he was holding a British residence permit, and that he had not been living in Russia during the past ten years. Bukovsky appealed against the decision at the RF Supreme Court on 28 December 2007 and, subsequently, before its cassation board on 15 January 2008.

=== Conflict with Putin's regime ===
Bukovsky was among the first 34 signatories of "Putin must go", an online anti-Putin manifesto published on 10 March 2010. In May 2012, Vladimir Putin began his third term as president of the Russian Federation after serving four years as the country's prime minister. The following year, Bukovsky published a collection of interviews in Russia which described Putin and his team as The heirs of Lavrentiy Beria, Stalin's last and most notorious secret police chief.

In March 2014 Russia annexed Crimea after Ukraine had lost control of its government buildings, airports and military bases in Crimea to unmarked soldiers and local pro-Russian militias. The West responded with sanctions targeted at Putin's immediate entourage, and Bukovsky expressed the hope that this would prove the end of his regime.

In October 2014, the Russian authorities declined to issue Bukovsky with a new foreign-travel passport. The Russian Foreign Ministry stated that it could not confirm Bukovsky's citizenship. The response was met with surprise from the Presidential Human Rights Council and the Human Rights ombudsman of the Russian Federation.

On 17 March 2015, at the long-delayed inquiry into Alexander Litvinenko's fatal poisoning, Bukovsky gave his views as to why Litvinenko had been assassinated. Interviewed on BBC TV eight years before, Bukovsky expressed no doubt that the Russian authorities were responsible for the London death of Litvinenko on 23 November 2006.

=== Child pornography case ===
On October 28, 2014, Bukovsky was accused in the UK of the possession of child pornography. In April 2015, Bukovsky was charged with multiple counts of the production and possession of child pornography. Bukovsky pleaded not guilty to the charges. The prosecutor, Will Carter, said that Bukovsky admitted to possessing child abuse materials which he downloaded over the course of 15 years, and that he described the activity as a "hobby" and "research", comparing it to stamp collecting. According to him, Bukovsky told police that he did not harm anyone or commit any crime by looking at the images, and said the minors on the images "looked as if they had been enjoying themselves". Forensic examination of Bukovsky's hard drives revealed thousands of child abuse images and videos – some category A – featuring mostly boys and children of toddler age, court was told. His computer was examined by computer forensics expert Howard Chivers, associate professor at the University of York, who testified in court that the evidence supported the view that the material was installed on the computer by the user and not a third party, and that it was impossible for the user to not have been aware of its presence.

Bukovsky denied "making any indecent or prohibited photographs, pseudo-photographs or videos of children", claiming he was a victim of a smear campaign by Russian state security services, whose hackers had allegedly planted the images on his computer. He protested the charges with a hunger strike and sued the Crown Prosecution Service for libel. The Court of Appeals dismissed the libel claim. Due to several health complications and medical operations, his trials were delayed multiple times and were eventually halted indefinitely.

Bukovsky's conspiracy theory on the material being planted is supported by the American journalist Bill Gertz, who asserts that Bukovsky was targeted "in a Russian disinformation operation shortly before he was to testify before the Owen commission in March 2015. A Russian hacker broke into his laptop computer and planted child pornography photographs on the device. A Russian intelligence agent then tipped off the European Union law enforcement agency, Europol, to the photos... It was a classic Russian disinformation and influence operation."

== Death ==
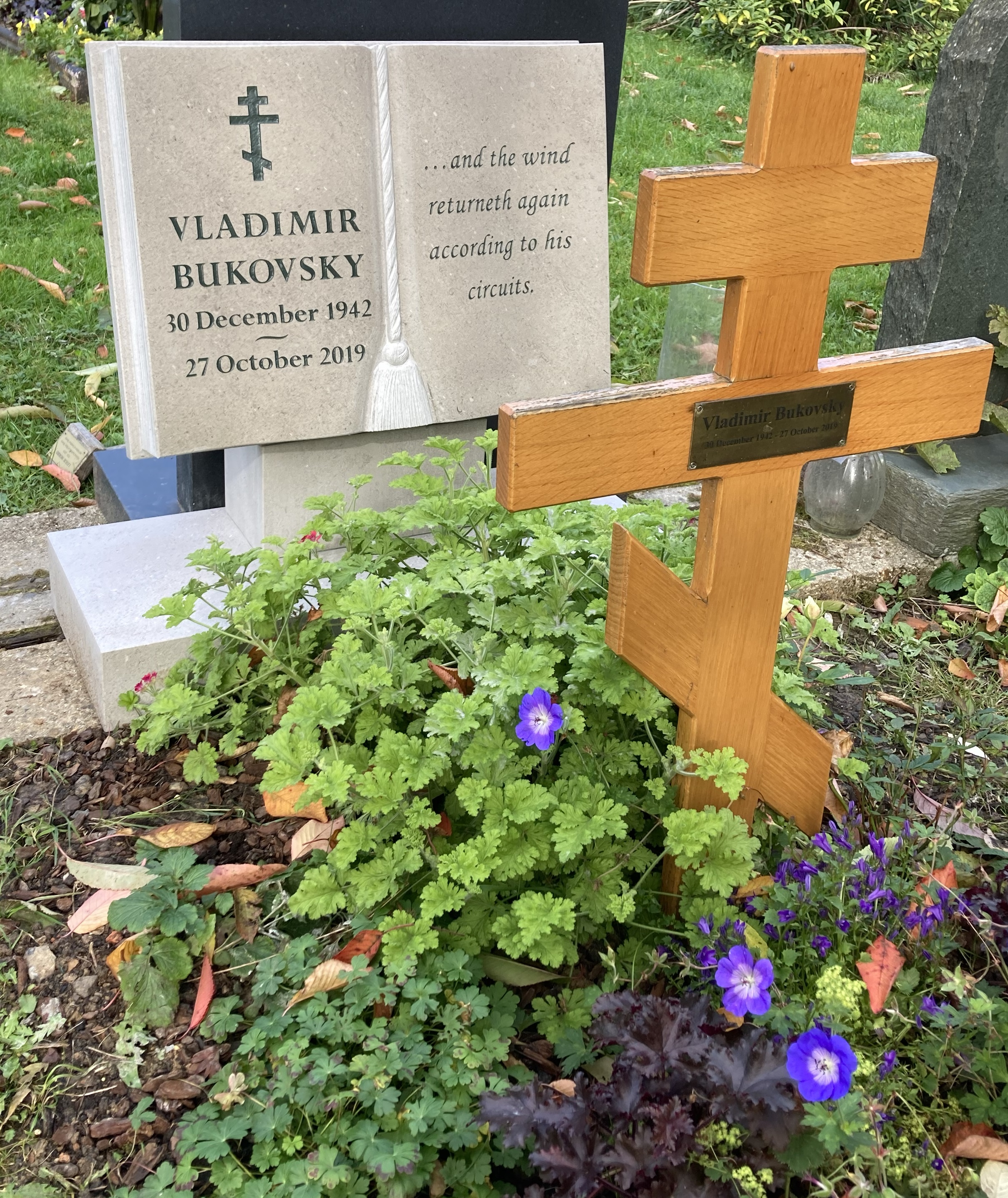
Grave of Vladimir Bukovsky in Highgate Cemetery

Bukovsky died of a heart attack on 27 October 2019 at the age of 76 in Cambridge, Cambridgeshire. He is buried on the eastern side of Highgate Cemetery.

== Bibliography ==
In translation

- 1978: To Build a Castle: My Life as a Dissenter (PDF). London: André Deutsch (UK edn). 1978. ISBN 978-0-233-97023-3. Archived from the original (PDF) on 1 May 2013. 352 pp.
  - (in Russian) 1979: I vozvrashchaetsi͡a veter—. New York: Khronika izd-vo. 1979. 386 pp.
  - 1979: To Build a Castle: My Life as a Dissenter. New York: Viking Press. 1979. ISBN 978-0-670-71640-1.
  - (in Russian) 2007: I vozvrashchaetsi͡a veter—. Svobodnyĭ chelovek. Moskva: Novoe izd-vo. 2007. ISBN 978-5-98379-090-2.
- 1987: To Choose Freedom. Hoover Press publication. Stanford, Calif: Hoover Institution Press. 1987. ISBN 978-0-8179-8442-7.
- 1995: Jugement a Moscou: un dissident dans les archives du Kremlin (in French). Paris: Robert Laffont. 1995. ISBN 978-2-221-07460-2. 616 pp.
  - Moskovskiĭ prot͡sess (in Russian). Parizh; Moskva: "Russkaia mysl'"; Izd-vo "MIK". 1996. ISBN 978-5-87902-071-7.
  - (in German) (1996) Abrechnung mit Moskau. Das sowjetische Unrechtsregime und die Schuld des Westens, Bergisch Gladbach
  - Moskiewski proces (in Polish). Warsaw: Politeja. 1999. ISBN 978-83-7227-190-7.
  - Judgment in Moscow: Soviet Crimes and Western Complicity (May 2019)
- 1999: Soviet Archives: Online archive compiled by Vladimir Bukovsky, prepared for publication by the late Julia Zaks (1938–2014) and Leonid Chernikhov
- 2016: The Bukovsky Archives upgraded version of 1999 archive.
- 2019: Judgment in Moscow: Soviet crimes and Western complicity

In Russian

- 1979: И возвращается ветер [To Build a Castle]. New York: Изд. "Хроника" (Khronika Press). 1979. 382 pp. The first publication in Russian of Bukovsky's memoirs was given a Biblical title (see Ecclesiastes, v. 6).
- 1989: "И возвращается ветер" [To Build a Castle]. Teatr: Literaturno-Chudožestvennyj Žurnal. М.: Teatr periodical. 1989. ISSN 0131-6885. The first publication of Bukovsky's memoirs in the USSR.
- 1996: Московский процесс [Judgment in Moscow]. М.; Париж: МИК: Рус. мысль. 1996. p. 525. ISBN 978-5-87902-071-7.
- 2001: Буковский В.; Геращенко И.; Ледин М.; Ратушинская И.; Суворов В. (2001). Золотой эшелон [The golden echelon]. Собрание. М.: Гудьял-Пресс. p. 256. ISBN 978-5-8026-0082-5.
- 2007: И возвращается ветер [To Build a Castle]. Свободный человек. М.: Новое изд-во. 2007. p. 348. ISBN 978-5-98379-090-2. (First serialised in Teatr periodical, see above, 1989).
- 2008: Письма русского путешественника [Letters of a Russian traveller]. Moscow & St Petersburg: Нестор-История [Nestor-History]. 2008.
- 2013: Наследники Лаврентия Берия. Путин и его команда [The heirs of Lavrenty Beria: Putin and his team]. M.: Алгоритм. 2013. ISBN 978-5-4438-0337-1.
- 2014: Тайная империя Путина. Будет ли "дворцовый переворот"? [Putin's secret empire. Will there be a "palace coup"?]. M.: Алгоритм. 2014. ISBN 978-5-4438-0880-2.
- 2015: На краю. Тяжелый выбор России [On the edge. Russia faces a hard choice]. M.: Алгоритм. 2015. ISBN 978-5-906798-82-4.

== Documentaries ==
- Bukovsky (1977) – documentary by Alan Clarke.
- They Chose Freedom (2005) (4 parts) – documentary by Vladimir Kara-Murza Jr.
- Russia/Chechnya: Voices of Dissent (2005) – with Bukovsky, Yelena Bonner, Natalya Gorbanevskaya, Anna Politkovskaya, Akhmed Zakayev and others.
- The Soviet Story (2008) – documentary by Edvīns Šnore
- Parallels, Events, People (2014) (36 parts) – documentary series by Natella Boltyanskaya
