= Boltyansky =

Boltyansky, Boltyanski or Boltyanskii (Russian: Болтянский) is a Russian masculine surname; its feminine counterpart is Boltyanskaya. It may refer to

- Natella Boltyanskaya (born 1965), Russian journalist, singer-songwriter, poet and radio host
- Vladimir Boltyansky (1925–2019), Russian mathematician
