= Pavel Felgenhauer =

Russian military analyst (born 1951)

- Born: Pavel Eugenievich Felgenhauer; 6 December 1951 (age 74); Moscow, Soviet Union (now Russia)
- Education: Candidate of Sciences
- Alma mater: Moscow State University (1975)
- Occupation: Journalist
- Children: Tatyana Felgenhauer (stepdaughter)

Pavel Evgenievich Felgenhauer (Russian: Па́вел Евге́ньевич Фельгенга́уэр; born 6 December 1951) is a Russian military analyst known for his publications about Russia's political and military leadership.

== Biography ==
Felgenhauer was born in 1951 in Moscow, the Soviet Union and graduated from Moscow State University as a biologist in 1975. He served as a researcher and senior research officer in the Soviet Academy of Sciences (Moscow) and received his Candidate of Sciences degree in biology from the Academy in 1988. He is based in Moscow. His stepdaughter, Tatyana Felgenhauer, is a journalist and presenter at the Echo of Moscow (defunct as of 2022).

Felgenhauer published numerous articles on topics dealing with Russian foreign and defense policies, military doctrine, arms trade, military-industrial complex and so on. From January 1991 until January 1993, he was associated with the Nezavisimaya Gazeta (Moscow) as defense analyst and defense correspondent. From February 1993 till September 1999, Felgenhauer was a member of the editorial board and chief defense correspondent of a Moscow daily Segodnya. Since May 1994 till October 2005, Felgenhauer published a regular column on defense in the English language local daily The Moscow Times. In July 2006, after being more than six years an independent defense analyst, Felgenhauer joined the staff of Novaya Gazeta. Felgenhauer continues to provide regular comments on Russia's defense-related problems to many other local and international media organizations, including The Jamestown Foundation.

== Sources ==
- List of articles by Felgenhauer in Novaya Gazeta (in Russian)
