= Cold War Liberation =

2022 book by Natalia Telepneva

- Cover
- Author: Natalia Telepneva
- Language: English
- Series: The New Histories of the Cold War
- Subject: The Portuguese Empire in Africa, the cold war
- Genre: Nonfiction
- Published: June 2022
- Publisher: The University of North Carolina Press
- Pages: 302
- ISBN: 978-1-4696-6585-6
- Text: Cold War Liberation online

Cold War Liberation: The Soviet Union and the Collapse of the Portuguese Empire in Africa, 1961–1975 is a book by Natalia Telepneva. It was published by the University of North Carolina Press in 2022.

== Critical reception ==
Dmitry Asinovskiy says that Telepneva "makes an incredibly important contribution to the Soviet side of this history" as she is the first to include Soviet ties with revolutionary movements in colonies of Portugal. He critisies however her lack of distinction between different subjects as she "refrains from addressing this distinction almost completely" between younger and older generations.

Erin Kimball Damman praised Telepneva as the book "produced an insightful and detailed addition to the history of the Cold War in Africa" and ' "is able to add precision and substantiation to certain arguments and give nuance to others" using material released by the Russian State Archive of Contemporary History during that time. Damman does note the shifting perspective from different cast of characters around the world "can become difficult to follow".

Alexander Hill called the book "both thoroughly researched and well written", with only minor factual issues regarding the Soviet military and Soviet naval.
