= Bill Cole (television journalist) =

American television journalist and producer

Bill Cole (1922-2006), was an American television journalist and producer, known for his work in assisting Soviet Russian dissidents.

== Career ==
In 1968 Bill Cole moved with his family to Moscow to work as a foreign correspondent for CBS News. During his time there, he conducted secret interviews with Vladimir Bukovsky, Andrei Amalrik, and Pyotr Yakir, which were then smuggled out of the country and aired in 1970 in a CBS News special report, "Voices from the Soviet Underground."

In 1970, Cole was asked to leave the Soviet Union with no reason given.

In 1973, Cole was featured in the Soviet propaganda film denouncing Western journalists titled "Pautina."
