= Tatyana Felgenhauer =

Russian journalist

- Татьяна Фельгенгауэр
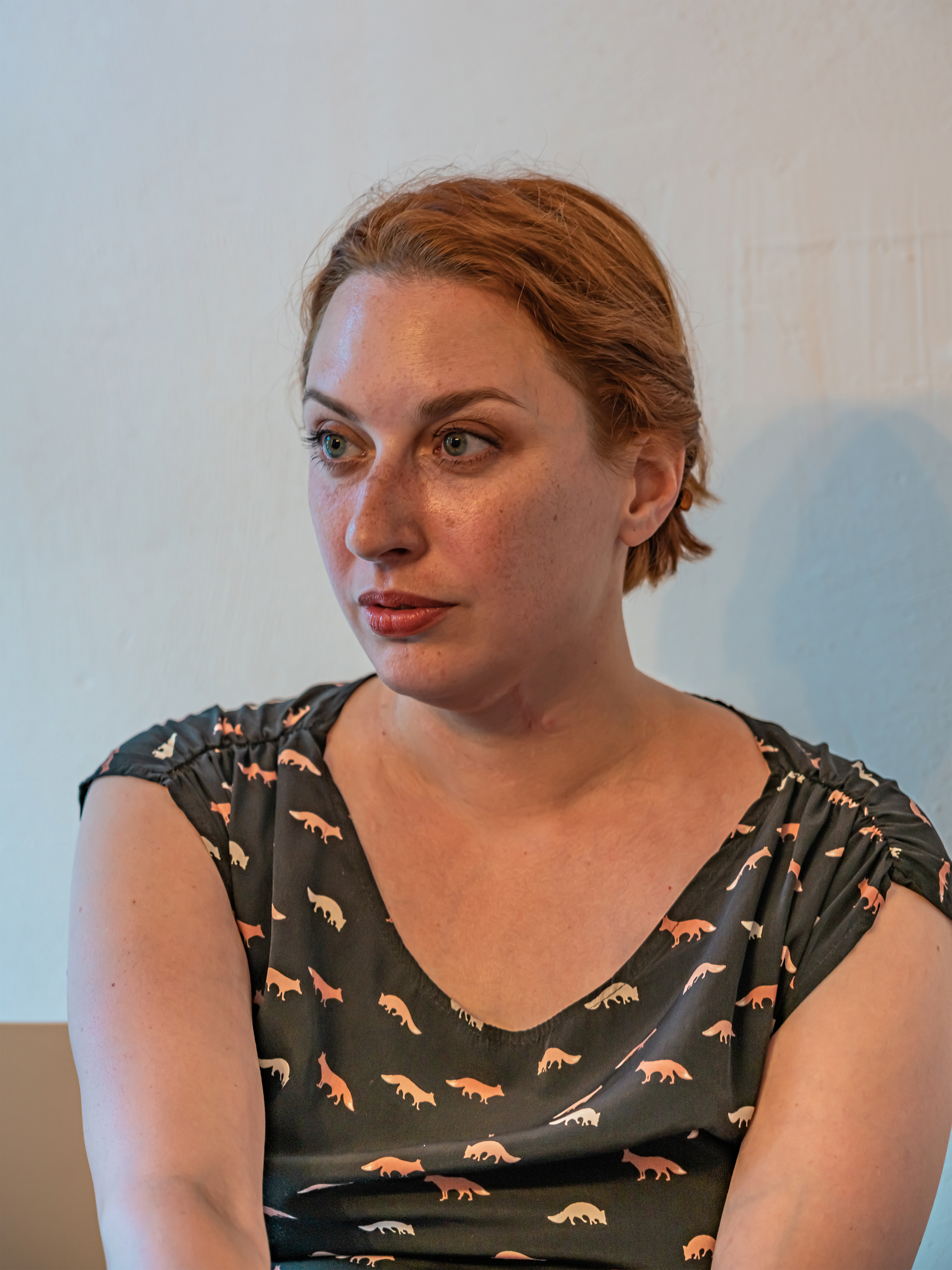
- Felgenhauer in 2023
- Born: Tatyana Vladimirovna Shadrina; 6 January 1985 (age 41); Tashkent, Uzbek SSR, Soviet Union
- Education: Moscow State Pedagogical University
- Occupation: Radio journalist
- Employer: Echo of Moscow
- Parent: Pavel Felgenhauer (stepfather)
- Awards: Moscow Prize (2010)

Tatyana Vladimirovna Felgenhauer (Russian: Татья́на Влади́мировна Фельгенга́уэр, IPA: [fʲɪlʲɡʲɪnˈɡaʊɨr]; born 6 January 1985) is a Russian journalist, correspondent and presenter of Echo of Moscow radio station, and its deputy editor-in-chief.

== Biography ==
She received the Moscow Prize in the field of journalism in 2010 (along with Matvey Ganapolsky).

The participant of the protest actions against the falsification of the elections in Bolotnaya Square and Sakharov Avenue, covered the events on the air of the radio station.

On 23 October 2017, a man with a knife forced his entry into the building of the Echo of Moscow radio station and wounded Felgenhauer in the neck. The attacker was a native of Georgia, Boris Grits, a 48-year-old with dual Russian and Israeli citizenship. A report on Russian television during the month accused the radio station, and Felgenhauer directly, of working to benefit foreign interests in Russia. Police treated the attack as an attempted murder.

During the CPJ International Press Freedom Awards ceremony actress Meryl Streep stated on stage that she admired the work of Tatyana Felgenhauer, Julia Ioffe and Masha Gessen.

In December 2018, she was included in Time's Person of the Year 2018, as one of The Guardians, a collection of journalists from around the world in their fight for the War on Truth.

She left Russia and moved to Vilnius in 2022. Since August of the same year, she has been a co-host (with Alexander Plyushchev) of DW News, a daily program on Deutsche Welle's Russian-language YouTube channel.

On 21 October 2022, Felgenhauer was included in the Russian list of foreign agents.

== Family ==
Born with the surname Shadrina, the military analyst Pavel Felgenhauer is her stepfather.

In May 2025, she married entrepreneur, web developer, and publisher Roman Levitin. The wedding was held in accordance with Jewish tradition. She has no children.
