= Alexei Venediktov =

Russian radio presenter

- Алексей Венедиктов
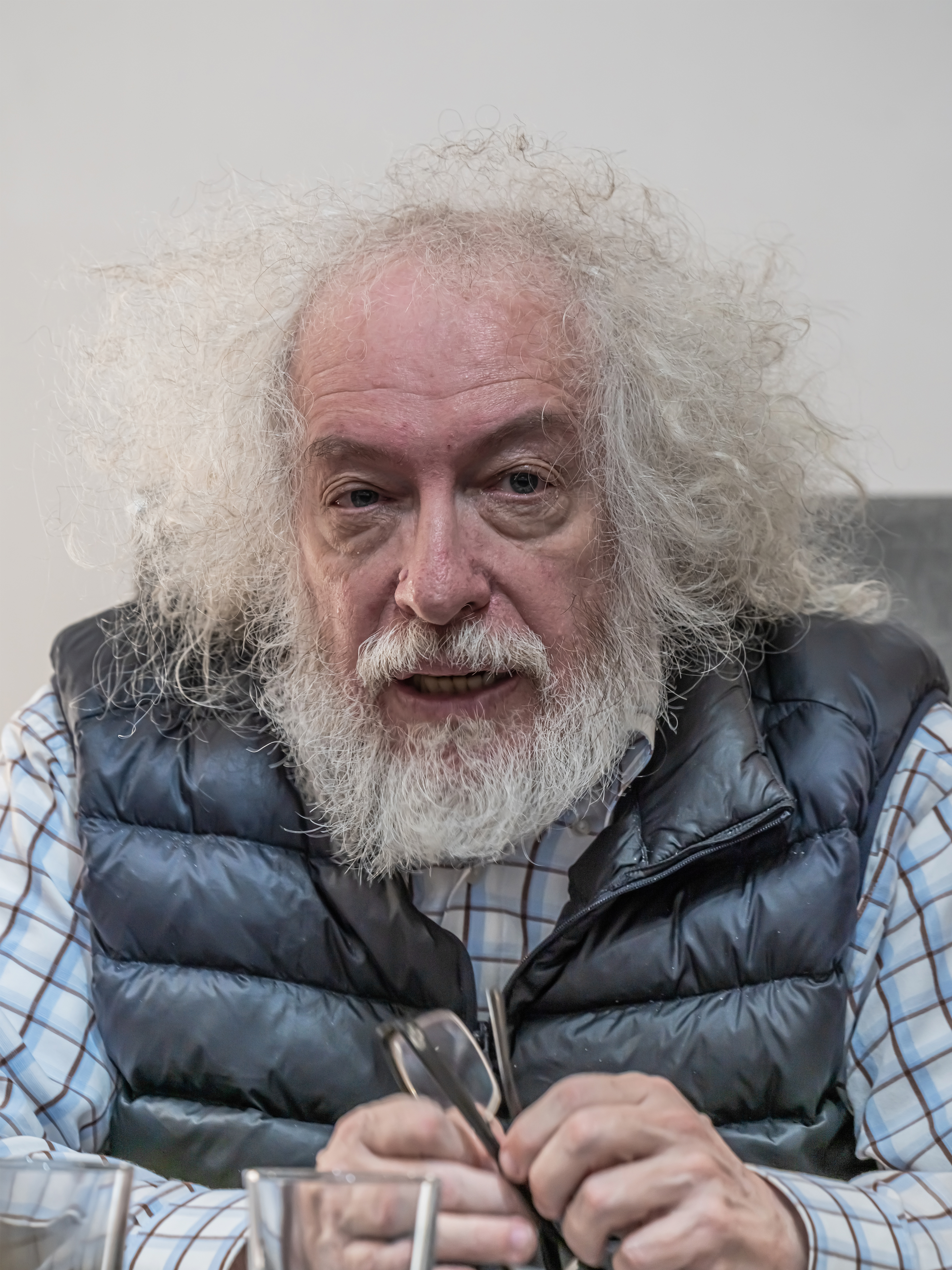
- Venediktov in 2024
- Born: Alexei Alexeyevich Venediktov; 18 December 1955 (age 70); Moscow, Russian SFSR, Soviet Union
- Education: Moscow State Pedagogical University
- Spouse: Yelena Sitnikova (m. 1998)
- Children: Alexei Alexeyevich Venediktov Jr.
- Parent(s): Alexei Venediktov, Eleonora Dykhovichnaya
- Presenting career
- Station: Echo of Moscow
- Country: Russia

Alexei Alexeyevich Venediktov (Russian: Алексе́й Алексе́евич Венеди́ктов; born 18 December 1955) is a Russian journalist, former editor-in-chief, host and co-owner of the Echo of Moscow radio station, as well as publisher of Diletant history magazine.

== Biography ==
=== Family and education ===
Alexei Venediktov was born in Moscow, USSR on 18 December 1955. His paternal grandfather Nikolai Andrianovich Venediktov served in NKVD and was awarded an Order of the Red Star for taking part in courts-martial and creating barrier troops during the Great Patriotic War. His father, Alexei Nikolaevich Venediktov, was a navy submarine officer killed in a storm shortly before Alexei's birth. Venediktov's mother, Eleonora Abramovna Dykhovichnaya, was a doctor of Jewish origin; she came from a generation of prominent engineers. In 1983 she along with Alexei's sister emigrated to the United States. One of her cousins was a film director Ivan Dykhovichny. A popular musician Andrey Makarevich also happens to be Alexei's distant relative.

Venediktov graduated from the evening division of Moscow State Pedagogical University in 1978. After graduation he worked as a postman for some time, then as a history teacher for 20 years straight, 19 of them — at the Moscow school No.875.

=== Echo of Moscow ===
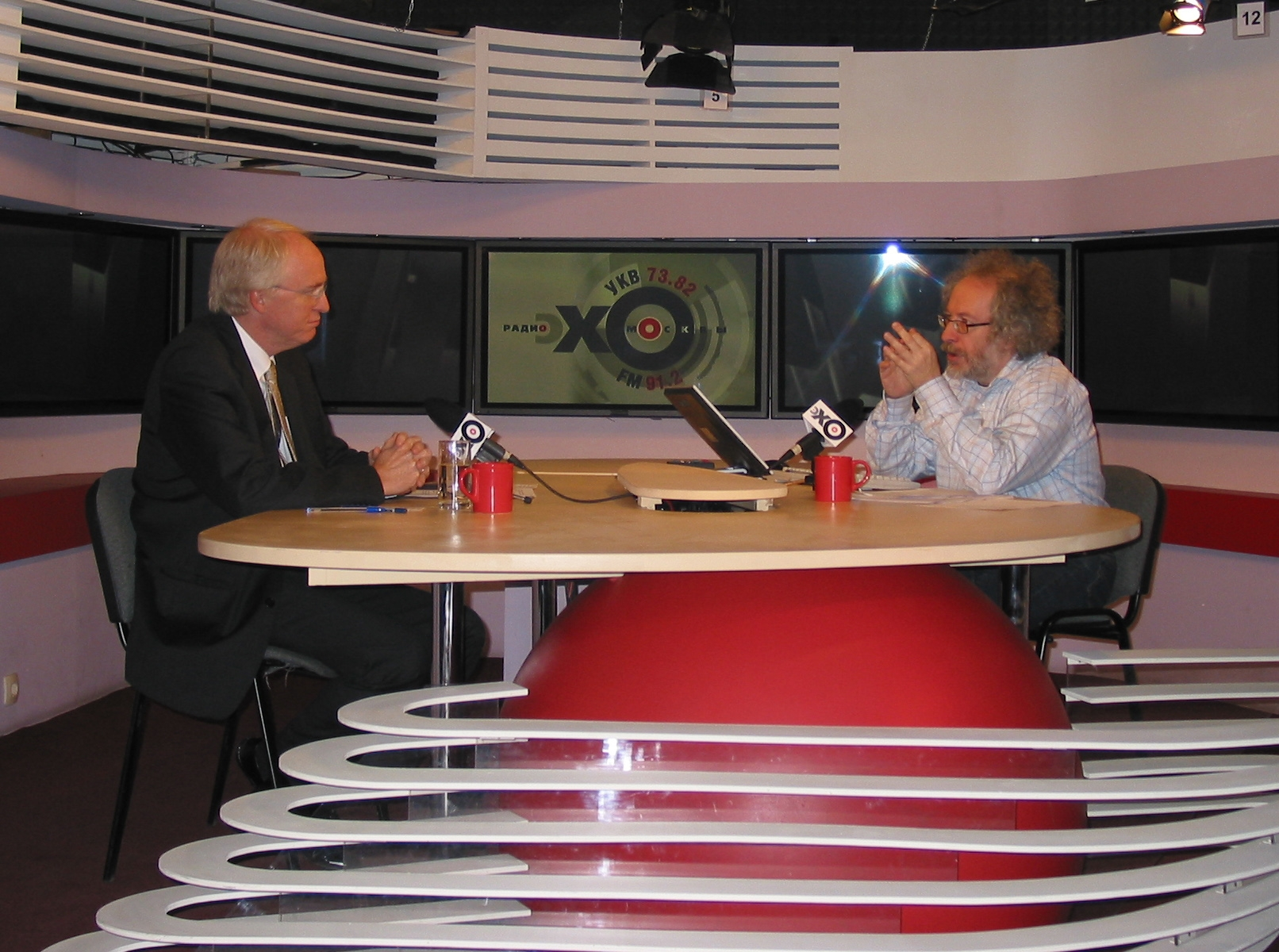
Venediktov interviews US Ambassador to Russia John Beyrle in 2008

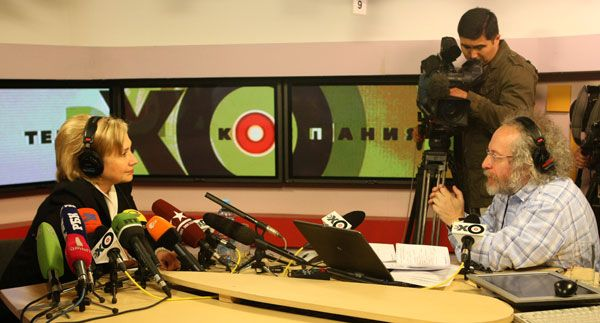
Venediktov interviews US Secretary of State Hillary Clinton in 2009

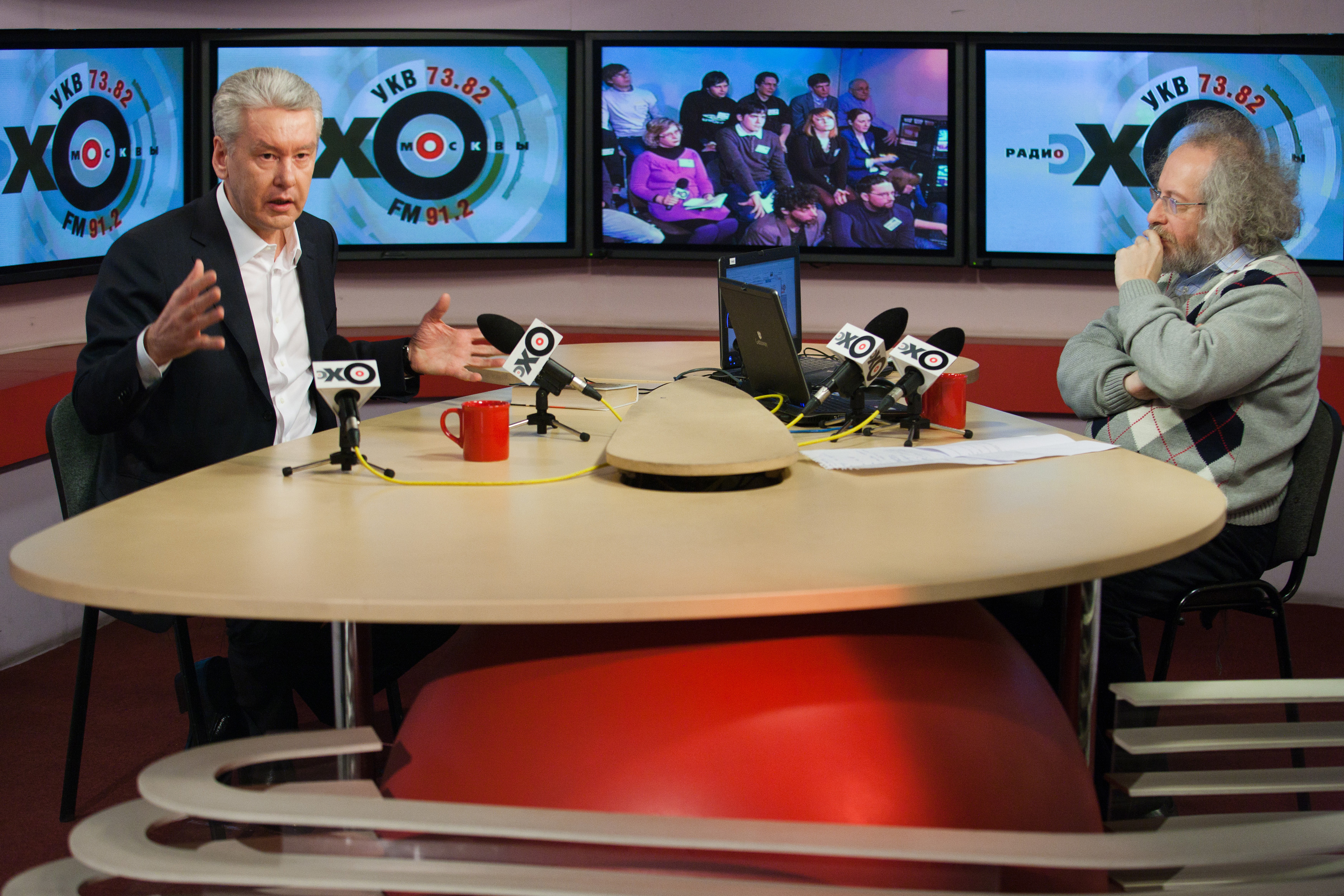
Venediktov interviews Mayor of Moscow Sergey Sobyanin in 2011

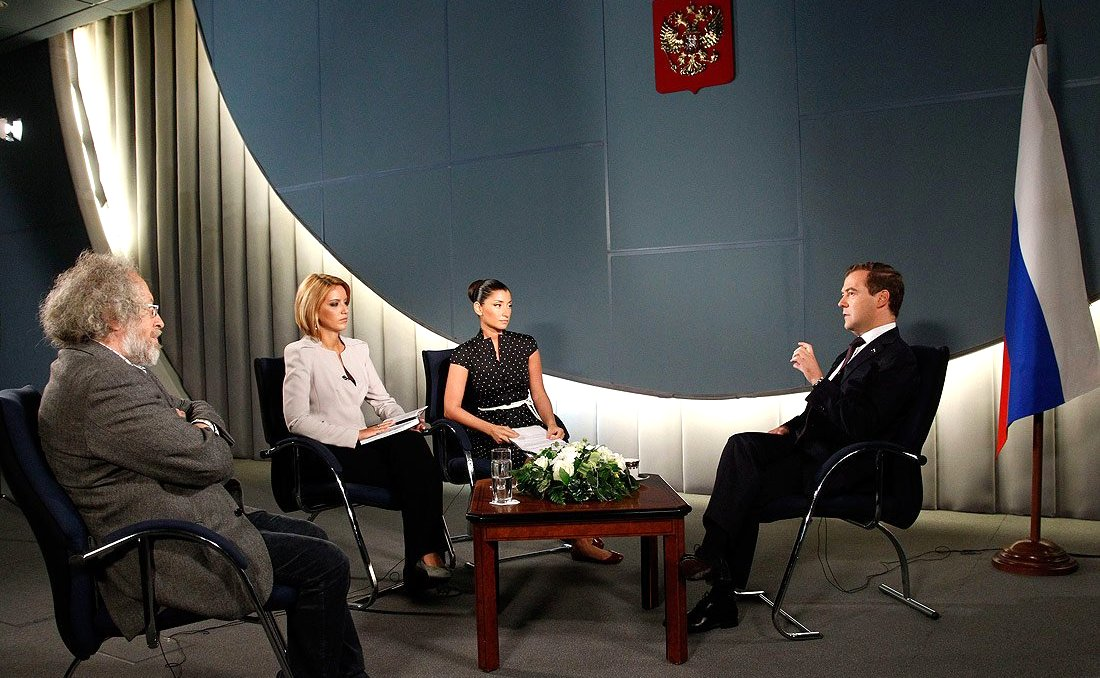
Venediktov interviews President Dmitry Medvedev along with Ekaterina Kotrikadze and Sophie Shevardnadze in 2011

In 1990, he began working for Echo of Moscow radio. He began as a newspaper observer and reporter and later headed the news division. He was editor-in-chief of Echo of Moscow from 1998 to 2022. During his tenure he interviewed presidents Bill Clinton, Jacques Chirac, Francois Hollande, Dmitry Medvedev, Kersti Kaljulaid and Ilham Aliyev; German chancellor Angela Merkel; US Secretaries of State Condoleezza Rice and Hillary Clinton; Armenian prime minister Nikol Pashinyan and many other prominent political leaders. From 2002 until 2010, Venediktov also served as president of Echo TV Russia.

On 6 December 1994, Venediktov traveled to Grozny as a correspondent for Echo to cover talks between Dzhokhar Dudayev and Russian parliamentarians who came to rescue Russian officers captured during an unsuccessful tank assault on Grozny. The meeting didn't happen, as Dudayev left to meet with general Pavel Grachev. The parliamentarians tried to persuade the captured officers to go home with them, but they were afraid, likely threatened that they'd be killed if they agreed. Venediktov took out a tape recorder and told the officers to say on record that they won't go anywhere, so that their families could know. The meeting was immediately stopped, and Dudaev's guards escorted him outside, made him face the wall and staged a mock execution. Ten minutes of clicking the bolts, and Venediktov was brought back. The delegation was allowed to take 7 out of 14 prisoners back to Moscow.

In 2006, he co-hosted a short-lived TV show In the Circle of Light with Svetlana Sorokina at Domashny TV channel. It was shut down within two weeks, supposedly for its harsh critics of the Judiciary of Russia, although the producer, Alexander Rodnyansky, denied it had anything to do with politics.

In February 2012, Venediktov resigned from Echo's board of directors in protest against the Gazprom-Media attempt to announcement to change the board. He later said that it was Vladimir Putin who personally saved him and his station from closure by Mikhail Lesin. According to Venediktov, this happened at least twice during the Dmitry Medvedev's presidency. Venediktov returned to the board in 2014, only to leave it again in June 2018. This time he opposed the harmful budgeting decisions made by the station's top management.

Until 2015, 33.02% of all Echo of Moscow's shares were owned by the American company EM-Holding, with 1/3 of them belonging to Venediktov and Yuri Fedutinov (ex-chief executive at the station) and others — to the Israeli media mogul Vladimir Gusinsky and his partners. But in 2015, the Russian State Duma passed a new law forbidding foreign citizens from owning more than 20% of all shares in a national media company. In order to bypass it, a Russian-based company named Echo of Moscow Holding Company was registered. As of 2016, it owned 13.10% of total shares (49.5% of them belonged to Venediktov alone), while the American company controlled 19.92% of shares.

=== Diletant magazine ===
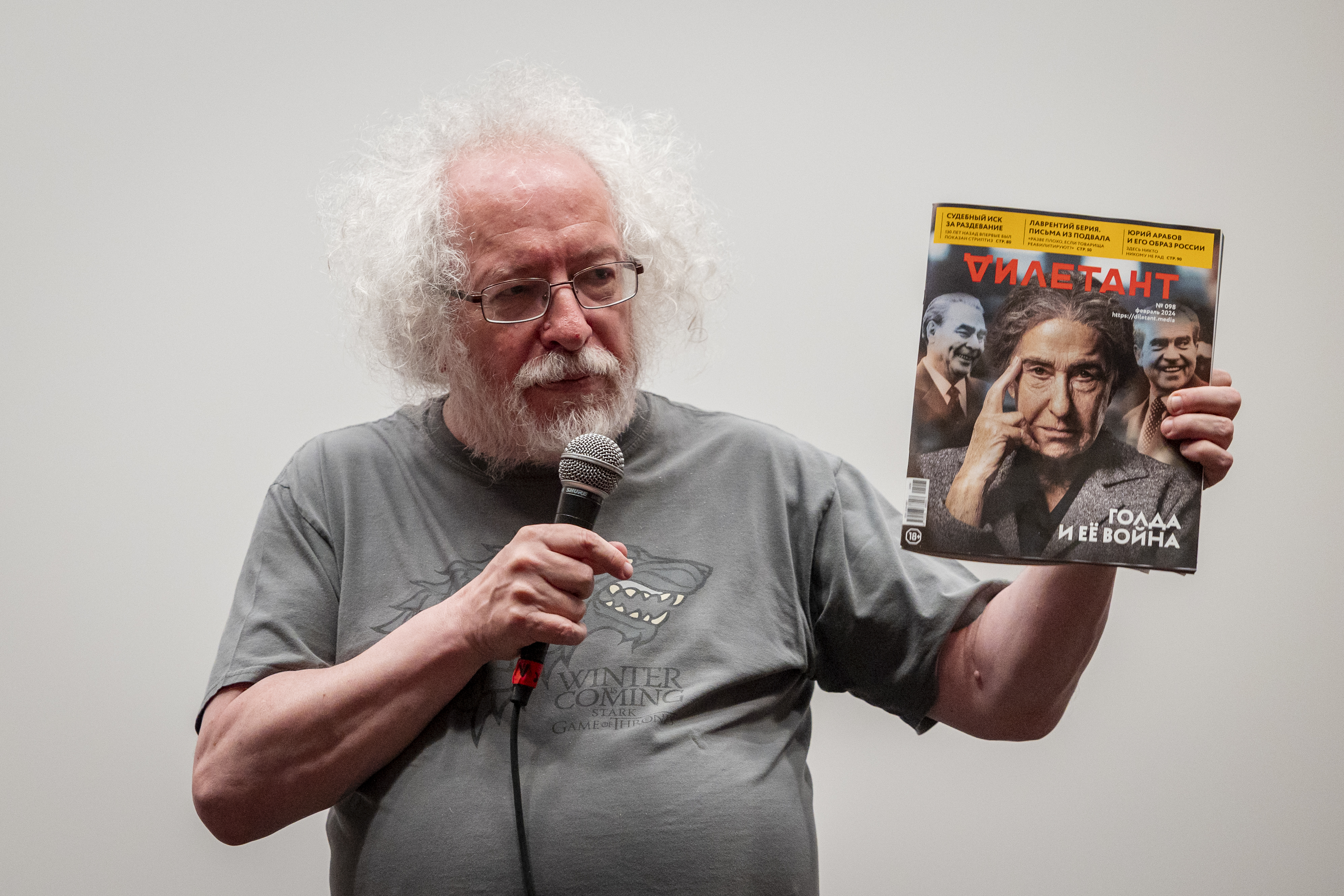
Venediktov presenting a Diletant issue in Tel Aviv, 2025

In 2012, Venediktov founded the first popular history magazine in Russia, Diletant. In 2014, he became the sole publisher of the magazine, and in 2018 Diletant broke even, with circulation reaching 60.000.

=== Political views and activity ===
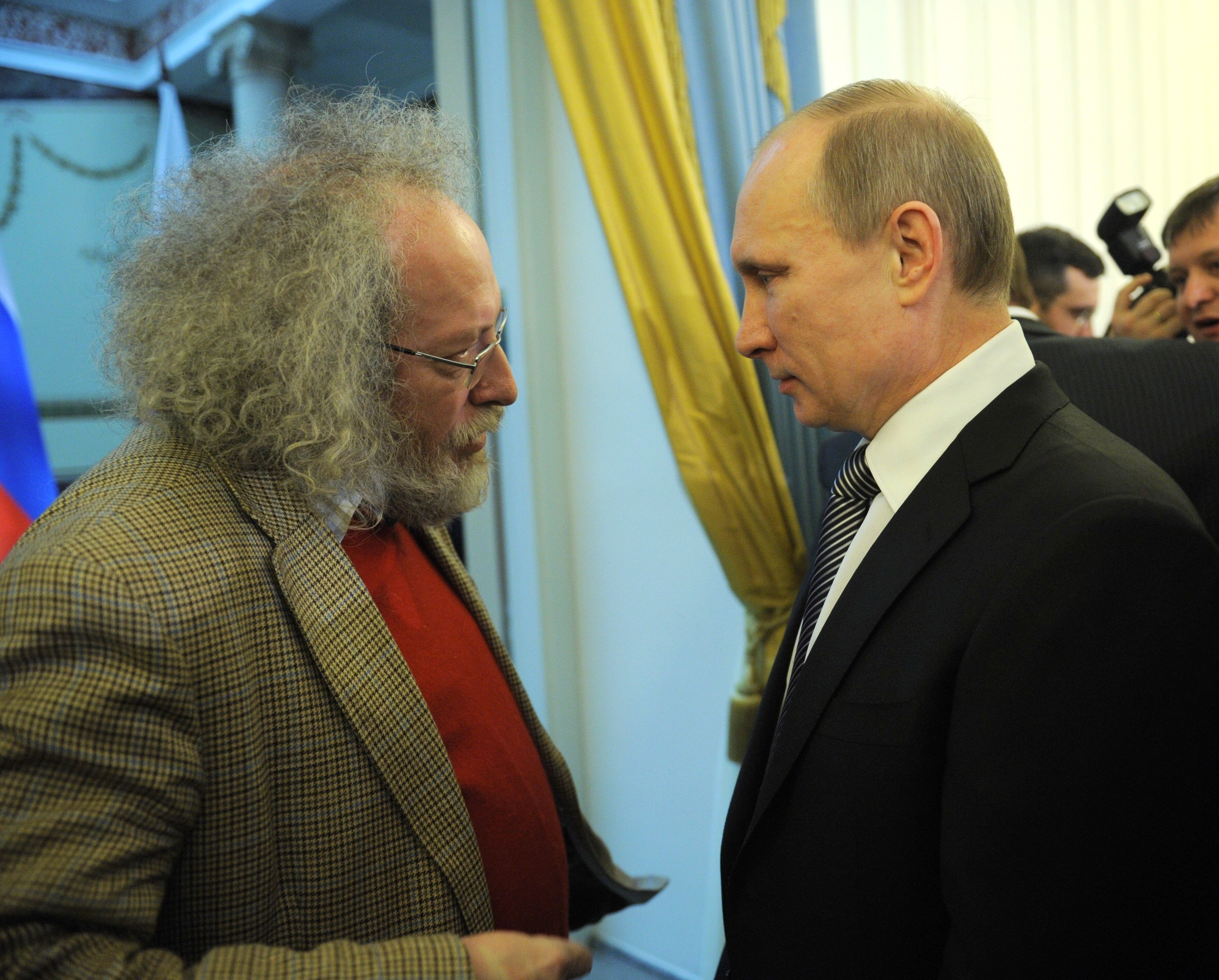
Venediktov talking to Vladimir Putin on 13 January 2012

Venediktov described his political views as conservative and himself as a reactionary, with Ronald Reagan and Margaret Thatcher representing his ideals in politics.

He is a member of the Public Board of the Russian Ministry of Defence and the Civic Chamber of Moscow since 2016.

Alexei Navalny's Anti-Corruption Foundation accused Venediktov of providing PR support to the mayor of Moscow in return for the money received for publishing an add-on to the Diletant magazine. Venediktov said that he had announced the collaboration openly and did not earn anything from the project.

In 2022, Venediktov was designated a "foreign agent" by the Russian government. In April 2026, Russian authorities brought administrative proceedings against him for allegedly participating in the activities of an "undesirable organisation", in connection with the Germany-based Echo project, which had been designated "undesirable" by Russian authorities in 2025. In May 2026, a Moscow court fined Venediktov 10,000 rubles over the publication of a video featuring him on the Echo website.

== Honours ==
- 1996 — Award «Golden Pen of Russia»
- 1998 — Medal of Security Council of Russia
- 1999 — II class Medal of the Order "For Merit to the Fatherland"
- 2006 — Legion of Honour, France
- 2008 — Award of Artyom Borovik, New York, USA
- 2014 — Gold Cross of Merit, Poland
- 2022 — Johann-Philipp-Palm-Award for Freedom of Speech and the Press, Germany (Archived 16 December 2022)
