= Comitatus pro Libertatibus =

The Freedom Committees (officially, in Latin, Comitatus pro libertatibus; in Italian Comitati per le Libertà) are a transnational association dedicated to the diffusion of the principles of liberalism and libertarianism.

== Story ==
The "Committees for Freedoms" were founded in 1997 on the initiative of the Russian writer Vladimir Bukovsky, the French historian Stéphane Courtois and the Italian writer and journalist Dario Fertilio as a federally-based international movement to defend and spread the culture of freedoms.

In the early years, the committees worked for the organization of various conferences, for example on October, 13th 1997 in honor of Edgardo Sogno in Turin.

In 2001 the General Assembly held in Florence elected Vladimir Bukovsky as President-General of the Committees. Another assembly took place in Rome from March, 1st to March, 3rd 2003.

== Memento Gulag ==
The Committees for Freedoms organized every year "Memento Gulag", a day of international studies on the repression and crimes of communist regimes, in particular Soviet totalitarianism. The workshop is always held on the same date, chosen for its symbolic value: 7 November, the day of the beginning of the October Revolution according to the Gregorian calendar.

Starting in 2003 the international workshop was held in various European towns:

- 2003: in Rome, 7–8 November;
- 2004: in Bucharest (in cooperation with the Memorial of the Victims of Communism and of the Resistance);
- 2005: in Berlin (in cooperation with the Istituto Italiano di Cultura of Berlin, the Gedenkstätte Berlin-Hohenschönhausen and the Konrad-Adenauer-Stiftung);
- 2006: in La Roche-sur-Yon (Vendée) (dedicated to the victims of the 1956 Hungarian counter-revolution);
- 2007: in Paris;
- 2008 in Milan;
- 2009 in Trieste;
- 2010 in Bologna;

The workshop showed the presence of the President of the Italian Senate Marcello Pera (on two occasions) and the President of the German (Bundestag) Norbert Lammert, of the former E.U. Commissioner and former Foreign Minister of Latvia Sandra Kalniete and of the President of Moldova Mihai Ghimpu.

In 2017 Dario Fertilio complained the limited interest to the event in recent years. In 2019, right after the death of Bukovskij, the themes of the workshop were reprised again on a conference on 7 November at the Senato della Repubblica organized under the patronage of Italian center-right MPs.

== Bibliography ==
- Vladimir Bukovsky (2006). Memento Gulag: zum Gedenken an die Opfer totalitärer Regime (in German). Duncker & Humblot. ISBN 978-3-428-12275-2.
- Centre de recherches Hannah Arendt (2007). Mémento goulag: mémoire et jugement du communisme - Actes de la journée d'études, La Roche-sur-Yon le 7 novembre 2006 (in French). Paris: Cujas. ISBN 978-2-254-07605-5.
- Dario Fertilio (2004). "La Morte rossa: storie di italiani vittime del comunismo". Marsilio. Marsilio. ISBN 978-88-317-8498-6.
- Vittorio Strada (7 November 2003). "Vittime dei gulag, è il tempo della memoria". Corriere della Sera. p. 37. Archived from the original on 6 January 2016.
- Anne Applebaum (10 November 2006). "Gulag. Che cosa resta di quella tragedia" (PDF). Il Diario di Repubblica. La Repubblica. p. 56.
- Jurij Samodurov (10 November 2006). "Nelle scuole in Russia dove la memoria tace" (PDF). Il Diario di Repubblica. La Repubblica. p. 56.

== See also ==
- Gulag
- Stalinism
- Vladimir Konstantinovič Bukovskij
- Stéphane Courtois
- Council of Europe resolution 1481
