= Echo TV Russia =

Echo TV
- Country: Russia

Programming
- Language: Russian

History
- Launched: 1991; 35 years ago

Links
- Website: echotv.ru

Echo TV (since February 15, 2002, also Ekho TV, Телекомпания «Эхо», Эхо-ТВ) is a television company. Echo TV is affiliated with Echo of Moscow radio station and RTVi satellite television network. The president is Alexei Venediktov.
