= Russian State Archive of Contemporary History =

- Interactive map of Russian State Archive of Contemporary History
- 55.74838582832806°N 37.62340225166016°E
- Alternative name: Российский государственный архив новейшей истории
- Location: Moscow, Russia
- Type: State Archive
- Established: 1999
- Period covered: Post-1952 documents of the Communist Party of the Soviet Union
- Website: Official website

The Russian State Archive of Contemporary History (RGANI) (Russian: Российский государственный архив новейшей истории (РГАНИ)) is a large Russian state archive managed by Rosarkhiv, which preserves post-1952 documents of the Communist Party of the Soviet Union. It was established in 1999 as the successor to the Center for Preservation of Contemporary Documentation (TsKhSD, Russian: Центр хранения современной документации (ЦХСД)), which acquired current records of the Communist Party nationalized after the failure of the Soviet coup attempt in 1991. A very large percentage of its files are still classified and many others are still difficult to access. In 1992 Soviet dissident Vladimir Bukovsky worked in the archive and secretly scanned copies of some documents.
