= Carter–Menil Human Rights Prize =

The Carter–Menil Human Rights Prize was established in 1986 by former United States president Jimmy Carter and US philanthropist Dominique de Menil to "promote the protection of human rights throughout the world". The foundation periodically gave out prizes of $100,000 to individuals and institutions that promote human rights. Carter was the chairman of the Prize Committee.
