= Natella Boltyanskaya =

Russian singer (born 1965)

Natella Boltyanskaya Нателла Болтянская
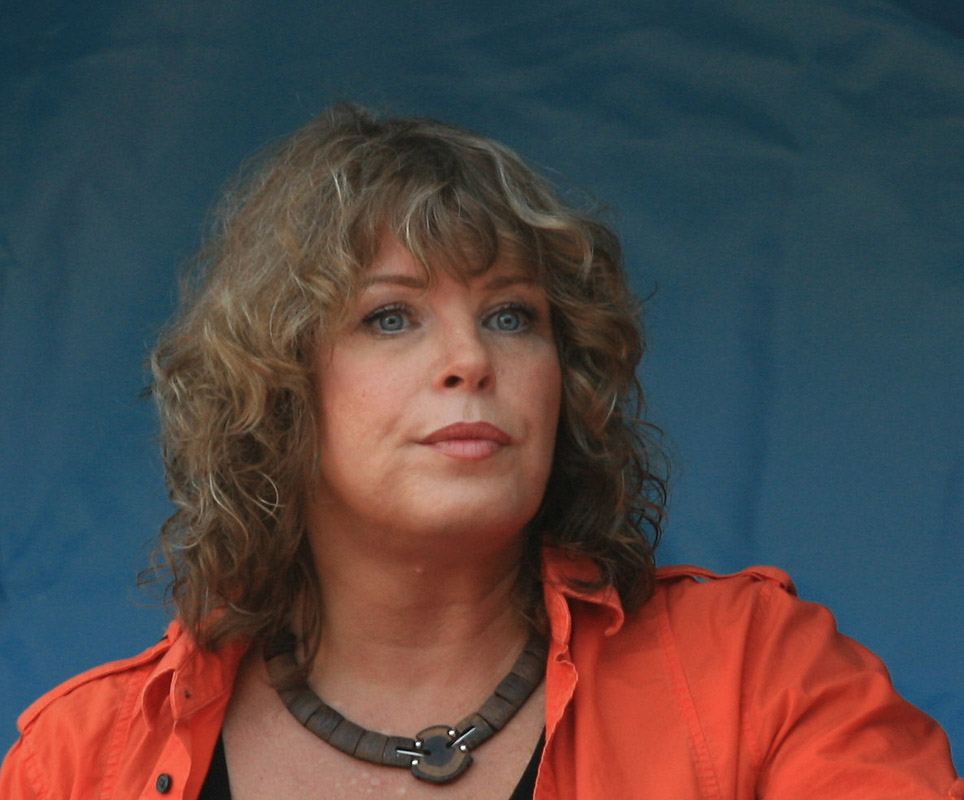
- Boltyanskaya in 2011

Background information
- Birth name: Natella Savelievna Kiperman
- Born: 20 May 1965 (age 60); Moscow, Soviet Union
- Genres: Singer-songwriter, author song,
- Occupation(s): radio and tv host, singer, composer and poet
- Instrument(s): Vocals, guitar
- Years active: 1993–present
- Website: www.natel.ru

Natella Savelievna Boltyanskaya (Russian: Нате́лла Саве́льевна Болтя́нская (Киперма́н); born 20 May 1965) is a Russian journalist, singer-songwriter, poet and ex-radio host on Echo of Moscow.

She is author and performer of songs mostly on her own poetry. She published four music albums, Warning (2001), Restoration (2003), Sleepers (2005), and Shepherd's Song (2009). She is author of many political songs, such as those dedicated to Nikita Khrushchev, Solomon Mikhoels, Anna Politkovskaya and song Gaechka ("Nut") regarded as criticism of Vladimir Putin

From 1993 to 2022, Boltyanskaya daily hosted several programs at Echo of Moscow, including program Bard about Russian author song, history program In the name of Stalin, and political/news programs People are against and Special opinion. Since 1993, she works as director of the Creative Association of Russian bards.

She also hosted programs on NTV (Russia), Echo TV Russia, Russian TNT, TV Tsentr and other TV channels. She produced the documentary Parallels, Events, People about the 2011–13 Russian protests and Soviet dissident movement.
