= Echo of Moscow =

Russian radio station

Coordinates: 55°45′8″N 37°35′46″E

Russian: Эхо Москвы
- Moscow; Russia
- Broadcast area: Russia; Riga, Latvia
- Frequency: 91.2 MHz

Programming
- Language: Russian
- Format: Talk; news; politics

Ownership
- Owner: Gazprom-Media (66%); Echo of Moscow Holding (33.2%); Other individuals (0.8%)

History
- First air date: 22 August 1990
- Last air date: 1 March 2022

Technical information
- Licensing authority: Roskomnadzor

Links
- Webcast: echo.moscow audio stream
- Website: echofm.online

Echo of Moscow (Russian: Эхо Москвы, romanized: Ekho Moskvy) was a 24/7 commercial Russian radio station based in Moscow. It broadcast in many Russian cities, some of the former Soviet republics (through partnerships with local radio stations), and via the Internet. From 1996 its editor-in-chief was Alexei Venediktov.

On 1 March 2022, it was taken off the air by Roskomnadzor accusing it of spreading false information about the Russian invasion of Ukraine. On 3 March, the board of directors voted to close the station down. While the radio programming of Echo of Moscow ceased to exist, Venediktov and most of the employees began a spin-off YouTube channel, Zhivoi Gvozd' (literally "Live Nail", in Russian a rhyming pun on the common term "Live Guest"), which follows the late station's format and schedule. In October 2022, Echo resumed online programming from Berlin, Germany via its Echo app.

== History ==
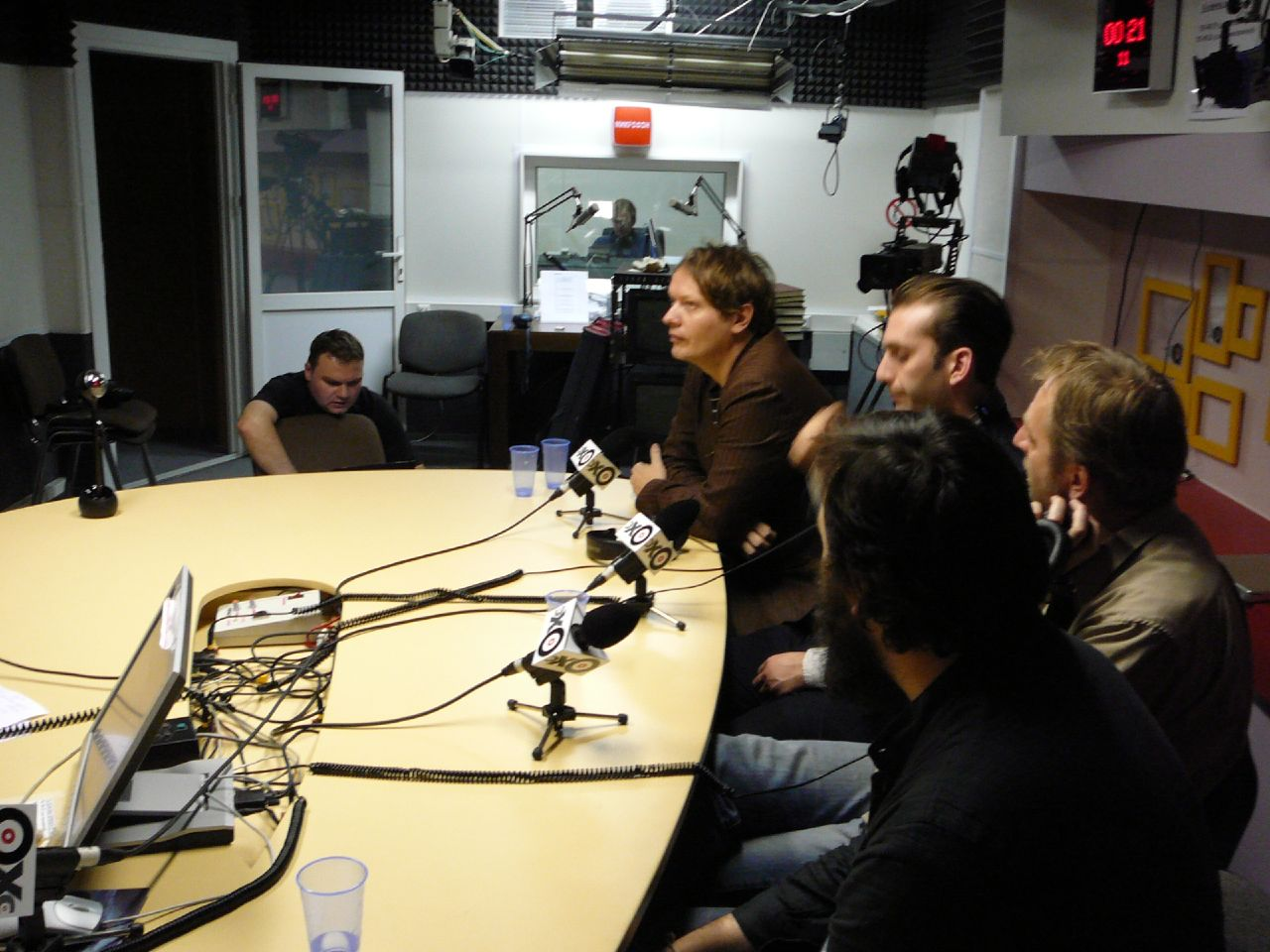
Studio interior during broadcast, 2007

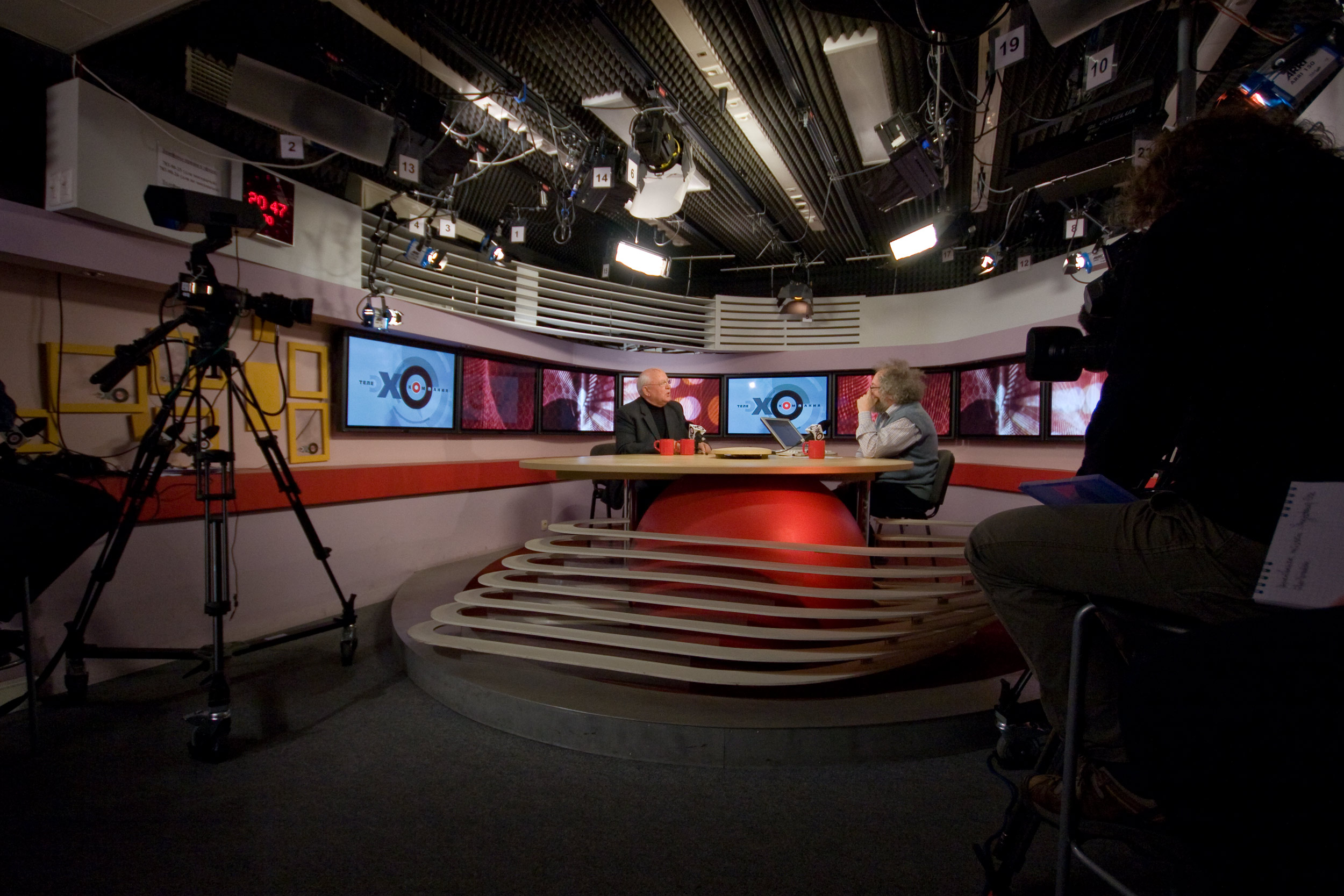
Mikhail Gorbachev (left) is interviewed by Alexei Venediktov (right) in the station's television studio, 2008

Echo of Moscow gained attention during the events of the 1991 Soviet coup d'état attempt – it was one of the few news outlets that spoke against the State Committee on the State of Emergency. The committee's decree number 3 on the suspension of Echo's broadcast is now regarded as a prestigious state award by the station's journalists. According to editor-in-chief Alexei Venediktov, the special KGB Alpha Group made several attempts to cut the radio's access to the transmitter, but its employees managed to connect the studio directly to the transmitter through the telephone line and continue broadcasting. From the first day of its existence Echo of Moscow adhered to one rule: "All significant points of view about events should be presented". Journalists have been jokingly calling the station "Ear of Moscow".

Most of Echo of Moscow's content consists of news and talk shows focusing on social and political issues, where the station tries to represent different points of view. Alexey Venediktov has been the station's chief editor since 1998. Radio hosts of the station include Viktor Shenderovich, Yulia Latynina, Sergey Parkhomenko, Alexander Nevzorov, Yevgenia Albats, Vladimir Kara-Murza, Vladimir Ryzhkov, Yevgeny Yasin and Sophie Shevardnadze. As of April 2014 Yulia Latynina was the most popular presenter at the radio station.

As of 2018 Echo of Moscow is majority owned by Gazprom-Media, which holds 66% of its shares. Editor-in-chief Alexei Venediktov is the largest minority shareholder, with 18% of shares, and the remaining 16% are held by other minority shareholders.

On 1 November 2014, the station received an official Roskomnadzor warning that a program the station had aired about Ukraine contained "information justifying war crimes". A radio station can be closed down if it receives two Roskomnadzor warnings in one year.

In October 2017, the station was broken into by an assailant who pepper-sprayed a security guard and soon afterwards stabbed Tatyana Felgengauer, one of Echo's main presenters, in the neck. Her injuries were life-threatening, but she was able to make a full recovery thanks to timely medical intervention. The station described the attacker as an Israeli, quoting "informed sources". Forensic medical expertise determined him to have paranoid schizophrenia, and he was sentenced to compulsory medical treatment by the court.

On 1 March 2022, the office of the Prosecutor-General of Russia asked Roskomnadzor to restrict access to Echo of Moscow as well as TV Rain due to their coverage of the invasion of Ukraine by Russian forces, claiming that they were spreading "deliberately false information about the actions of Russian military personnel" as well as "information calling for extremist activity" and "violence". Later that day, Echo of Moscow was taken off the air, the first time since 1991. The following morning, according to Venediktov, YouTube blocked the station's channel, its only broadcasting avenue in Europe, because the station is affiliated with Gazprom. On 3 March, Venediktov reported that the YouTube channel was unblocked. On 3 March, the board of directors voted to close the station down. The station's radio frequency was subsequently taken over by state-run Radio Sputnik.

Venediktov and some of the employees have started a spin-off YouTube channel, Zhivoi Gvozd', that follows the station's programming and format. In September 2022, a number of former Echo of Moscow employees launched an internet media called "Echo", headed by Echo of Moscow's former deputy editor-in-chief Maxim Kurnikov.

In 2024, a documentary using real-time videos of how the staff of Echo of Moscow, Novaya Gazeta, and TV Rain coped with the government's suppression of the freedom of speech, was made.

== Editorial independence ==
On multiple occasions in 2008, editor-in-chief Alexei Venediktov was asked about whether Gazprom's majority ownership affects Echo's editorial policy. Venediktov responded that shareholders including Gazprom abide by Echo's charter, which stipulates that the editor-in-chief has the final say, and though he noted that Gazprom and others attempt to influence specific coverage in accordance with their business interests, they have never sought to actively intervene in editorial decisions. Venediktov also noted that during his tenure it has become station policy to broadcast Gazprom press statements upon request, and to always request comment from Gazprom prior to airing negative stories about the company.

== Frequencies ==
- Abakan — 71.06 FM
- Barnaul — 69.11 FM
- Blagoveshchensk — 101.5 FM
- Buzuluk — 95.8 FM
- Chelyabinsk — 73.97, 99.5 FM
- Chicago — 1330 AM
- Ekaterinburg — 91.4 FM
- Kazan — 105.8 FM
- Makhachkala — 105.2 FM
- Moscow — 91.2 FM
- Nizhnevartovsk — 107.0 FM
- Orenburg — 101.3 FM
- Omsk — 70.55, 105.0 FM
- Penza — 107.5 FM
- Perm — 91.2 FM
- Rostov-on-Don — 69.44 FM
- Samara — 99.1 FM
- Saint Petersburg — 91.5 FM
- Saratov, Engels — 105.8 FM
- Tolyatti — 107.9 FM
- Tomsk — 105.0 FM
- Tyumen — 72.44 FM
- Tver — 107.2 FM
- Ufa — 91.1 FM
- Ukhta — 105.0 FM
- Vladikavkaz, Beslan — 102.8 FM
- Volgograd — 101.1 FM
- Vologda — 105.7 FM
- Zelenogorsk — 71.06 FM

== See also ==
- Echo TV Russia
- List of Russian-language radio stations
