= Parallels, Events, People =

- Параллели, события, люди
- Directed by: Kirill and Ksenia Sakharnov
- Based on: stories of participants in the 2011–13 Russian protests and Soviet dissident movement
- Produced by: Natella Boltyanskaya; Lyudmila Alexeyeva; Pavel Litvinov; Sergei Sharov-Deloney
- Narrated by: Natella Boltyanskaya
- Edited by: Nata Li
- Distributed by: Voice of America
- Release date: May 13, 2014 (Moscow)
- Country: Russia
- Languages: Russian, English

Parallels, Events, People (Russian: Паралле́ли, собы́тия, лю́ди) is documentary series on the Soviet dissident movement and 2011–13 Russian protests.

Parallels, Events, People is produced by Natella Boltyanskaya with support from the Oak Foundation and the Andrei Sakharov Foundation. The documentary series was first presented on 13 May 2014 in Memorial society.

== See also ==
- They Chose Freedom
- Dissenters' March
- 2011–13 Russian protests
