= Versailles (house) =

House in Lake Butler, Florida, U.S.

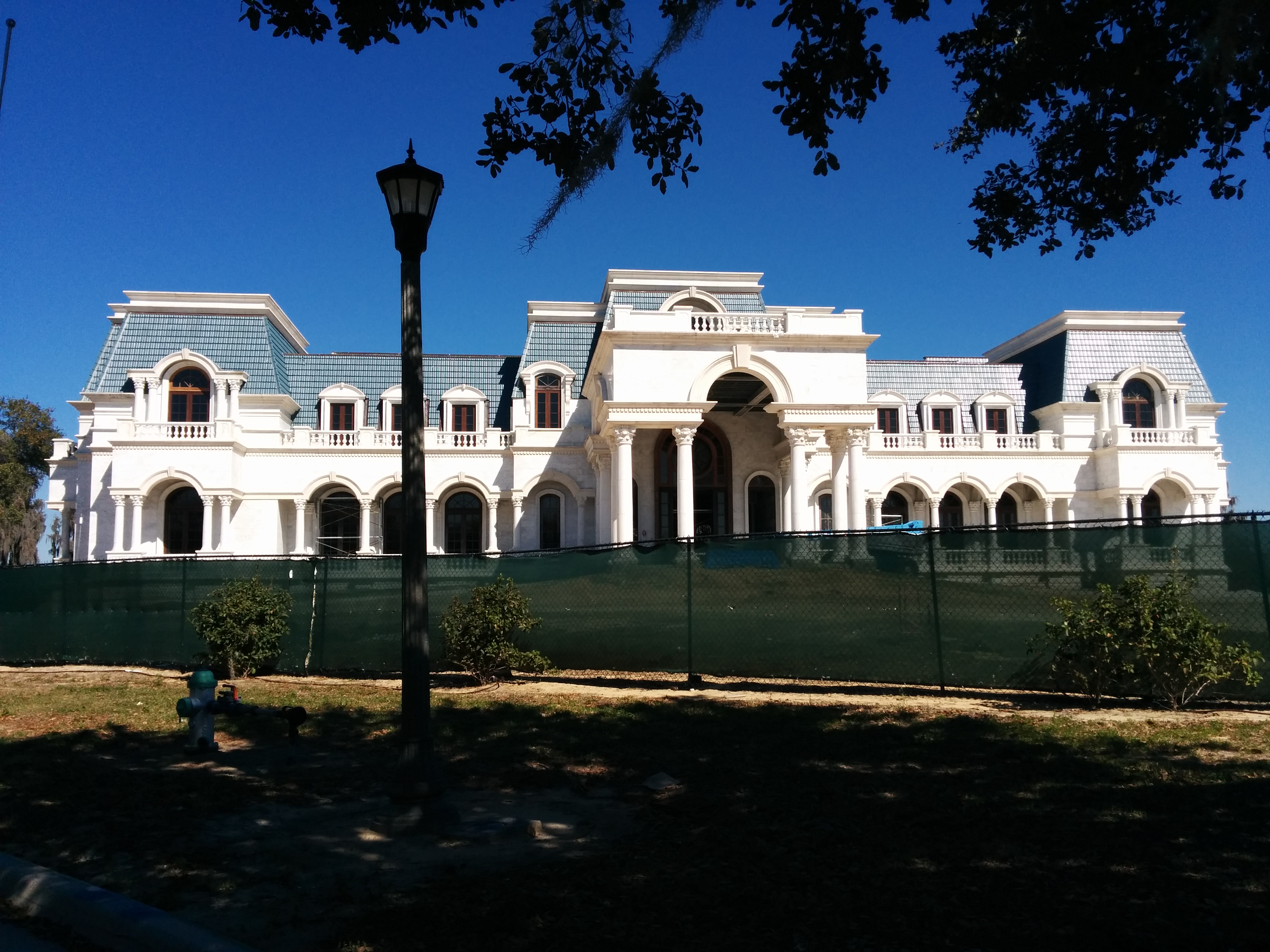
- Status of construction in February 2016

General information
- Status: Under construction
- Architectural style: Châteauesque
- Location: Lake Butler, Florida
- Coordinates: 28.4731°N 81.5512°W
- Construction started: 2004
- Owner: Jackie Siegel

Technical details
- Size: 90,000 sq ft (8,400 meters squared)

Design and construction
- Architect: David A. Siegel

Versailles is a 90,000-square-foot (8,400 m^{2}) house belonging to Westgate Resorts founder David Siegel and his wife Jackie. It is under construction at 6121 Kirkstone Lane, Lake Butler, Florida, in the gated community of Lake Butler Sound in Orange County, Florida, United States. Named and modeled after the Palace of Versailles in France, the completed project would be one of the largest single-family homes in the United States. It is designed as the primary residence of the Siegels and their children.

== History ==
Construction began in 2004. Work stalled in 2009 with 60% completed as Siegel's company encountered financial difficulties. The house was subsequently listed for sale at $65 million. With Westgate Resorts' improved finances as of 2013, Siegel came to own the property outright and construction resumed, with completion initially scheduled for 2016. In September 2022, the house was hit by Hurricane Ian, which Jackie Siegel said caused over $10 million of damage, including flooding, caved in ceilings, and roof damage. As of July 2024 the house remained uncompleted; however a January 2025 update from Jackie Siegel suggested that the house was nearing completion. Expected to appraise at over $100 million, the project was estimated in 2011 to be the fourth most expensive house in the United States.

== Design ==
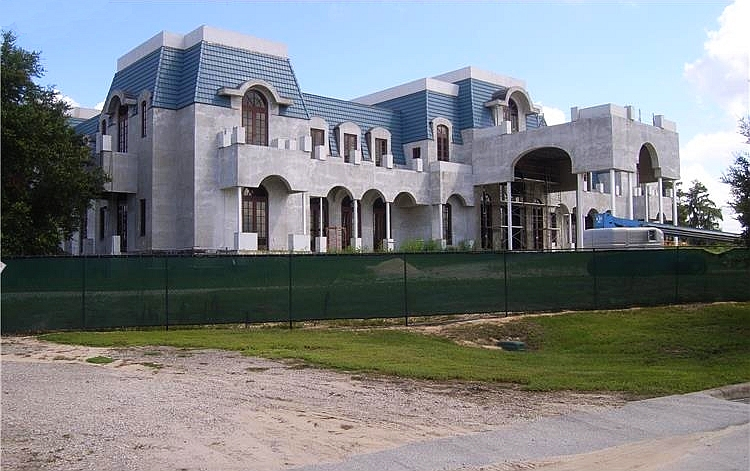
Versailles house in 2014

Built on a constructed hill on 10 acres (4.0 ha) of lakefront property, the residence is expected to include nine kitchens, 14 bedrooms, three indoor pools, two outdoor pools, a video arcade, a ballroom with a capacity of 500 to 1,000 people, a two-story movie theater with a balcony inspired by the Palais Garnier, a 20,000-bottle wine cellar, an exotic-fish aquarium, two tennis courts, a two-lane commercial grade bowling alley, a baseball diamond, a formal outdoor garden, and an elevator in the master bedroom closet. As the Siegels' children aged, modifications to the original plans included turning playrooms into a yoga studio and a teenager's cave with a second movie theater.

Doors and windows are constructed using some of the last remaining legal Brazilian mahogany at a cost of $4 million, cut before the Brazilian government banned trade in big-leaf mahogany in 2001. Exterior walls are precast concrete with Pavonazzo marble veneer.

David Siegel died on April 5, 2025, at the age of 89.

== Documentary ==
The home and its owners were the subject of the 2012 documentary film The Queen of Versailles and its 2024 theatrical adaptation, as well as an episode of CNBC's Secret Lives of the Super Rich.

A follow-on Discovery+ TV series, The Queen of Versailles Reigns Again (2022), followed the house and Siegel family a decade later.
