= F. Murray Abraham on screen and stage =

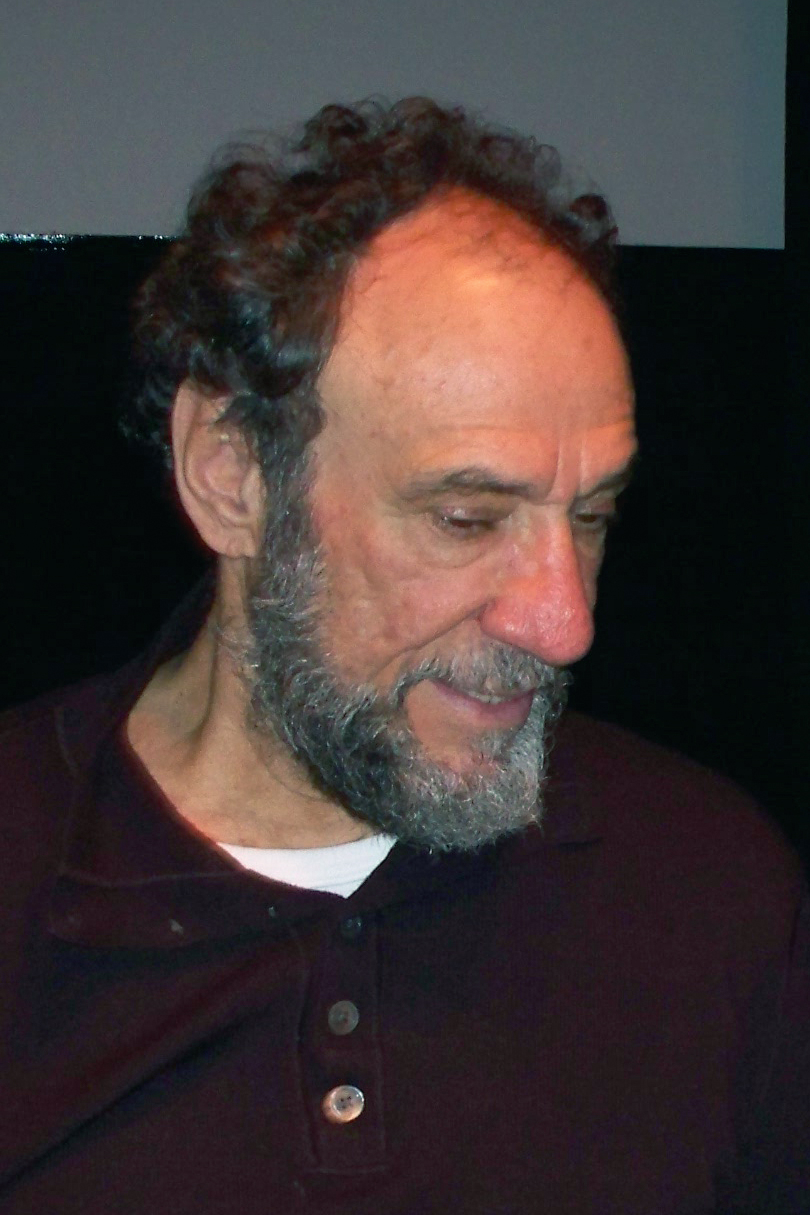
F. Murray Abraham in 2008

F. Murray Abraham is an American actor known for his work in film, television and theatre.

== Filmography ==
=== Film ===
Year	Title	Role	Notes
1971	They Might Be Giants	Clyde	
1973	Serpico	Serpico's Partner	Uncredited
1975	The Prisoner of Second Avenue	Taxi Driver	
1975	The Sunshine Boys	Car Mechanic	
1976	All the President's Men	Paul Leeper	
1976	The Ritz	Chris	
1978	The Big Fix	Howard Eppis	
1983	Scarface	Omar Suárez	
1984	Amadeus	Antonio Salieri	
1986	On the Wing	Narrator	Documentary short
1986	The Name of the Rose	Bernardo Gui	
1988	The Third Solution	Father Carafa	
1989	Slipstream	Cornelius	
1989	Beyond the Stars	Dr. Harry Bertram	
1989	The Favorite	Abdul Hamid	
1989	An Innocent Man	Virgil Cane	
1990	Cadence	Captain Ramon Garcia	Uncredited
1990	The Battle of the Three Kings	Osrain	
1990	The Bonfire of the Vanities	District Attorney Abe Weiss	Uncredited
1991	Mobsters	Arnold Rothstein	
1991	Money	Will Scarlet	
1991	By the Sword	Max Suba	
1991	Eye of the Widow	Kharoun	
1992	Through an Open Window	Narrator (voice)	Short film
1993	National Lampoon's Loaded Weapon	Dr. Harold Leacher	
1993	Sweet Killing	Zargo	
1993	Last Action Hero	Detective John Practice	
1994	Fresh	Chess Hustler	Uncredited
1994	L'Affaire	Lucien Haslans	
1994	Surviving the Game	Derek Wolfe Sr.	
1994	Nostradamus	Julius Caesar Scaliger	
1995	Mighty Aphrodite	Leader	
1995	Dillinger and Capone	Al Capone	
1996	Children of the Revolution	Joseph Stalin	
1997	Mimic	Dr. Gates	
1997	Una vacanza all'inferno	Belisario	
1997	Eruption	President Mendoza	
1998	Star Trek: Insurrection	Ahdar Ru'afo	
1999	Muppets from Space	Noah	Cameo
1999	The All New Adventures of Laurel & Hardy in For Love or Mummy	Henry Covington	
2000	Finding Forrester	Professor Robert Crawford	
2000	David Proshker	Narrator	Short film
2001	The Knights of the Quest	Delfinello da Coverzano	
2001	Thir13en Ghosts	Cyrus Kriticos	
2002	The Hire	Airport Guru	Segment: "The Ticker"
2002	Joshua	Father Tardone	
2003	Five Moons Square	The Entity	
2003	Rua Alguem 5555: My Father	Paul Minsky	
2004	Another Way of Seeing Things	Narrator	Short film
2004	Too Much Romance... It's Time for Stuffed Peppers	Jeffrey	
2004	The Bridge of San Luis Rey	Viceroy of Peru	
2006	The Stone Merchant	Shahid	
2006	Quiet Flows The Don	Pantaley	
2006	The Inquiry	Nathan	
2007	Wine and Kisses	Ruggero	
2007	Blood Monkey	Professor Hamilton	
2008	Carnera: The Walking Mountain	Léon Sée	
2008	A House Divided	Grandfather Wahid	
2009	Perestroika	Professor Gross	
2009	Barbarossa	Siniscalco Barozzi	
2010	The Unseen World	John Henry Newman	
2012	Goltzius and the Pelican Company	The Margrave of Alsace	
2012	The Day of the Siege: September Eleven 1683	Father Marco d'Aviano	
2013	Dead Man Down	Gregor	
2013	Inside Llewyn Davis	Bud Grossman	
2013	The Gambler Who Wouldn't Die	Braque	
2014	The Grand Budapest Hotel	Mr. Moustafa	
2014	The Mystery of Dante	Dante Alter Ego	
2014	A Little Game	Norman Wallach	
2018	Isle of Dogs	Jupiter	Voice
2018	Robin Hood	Cardinal Franklin	
2019	How to Train Your Dragon: The Hidden World	Grimmel	Voice
2019	Lady and the Tramp	Tony	
2021	Things Heard & Seen	Floyd DeBeers	
2022	The Magic Flute	Dr. Longbow	
2023	Double Soul	Mentor	
2023	Mother, Couch	Marcus / Marco	
2025	The Phoenician Scheme	Prophet	the cast.
2026	Out of This World		Post-production
TBA	Time Out		Filming
TBA	Bookends	Saul	Post-production

=== Television ===
Year	Title	Role	Notes
1975	How to Survive a Marriage	Joshua Browne	Episode #1.325
1975, 1977	Kojak	Solly Nurse / Eddie Gordon	2 episodes
1976	All in the Family	Clerk	Episode: "The Unemployment Story: Part 1"
1977	A.E.S. Hudson Street	Dr. Tony Menzies	Aired pilot; replaced by Gregory Sierra
1977	The Andros Targets	Bobby Carr	Episode: "The Killing of a Porno Queen"
1977	Sex and the Married Woman	Duke Skaggs	Television film
1982–1983	Marco Polo	Jacopo	6 episodes
1986	Dream West	Abraham Lincoln	2 episodes
1989	The Betrothed	Innominato	2 episodes
1990	A Season of Giants	Pope Julius II	Television film
1992	The First Circle	Joseph Stalin	Television film
1993	Journey to the Center of the Earth	Professor Harlech	Television film
1993	Il caso Dozier	Goldstein	Television film
1996	Dead Man's Walk	Captain Caleb Cobb	3 episodes
1999	Excellent Cadavers	Tommaso Buscetta	Television film
1999	Esther	Mordechai	Television film
1999	Noah's Ark	Lot	Televison mini-series
2000	The Darkling	Bruno Rubin	Television film
2000	ill it Un dono semplice	Thomas Barlow	Television film
2003	Kingdom of David: The Saga of the Israelites	Narrator (voice)	Television documentary
2003	Pompeii: The Last Day	Narrator (voice)	Television documentary
2005	NOVA - Newton's Dark Secrets	Narrator (voice)	Television documentary
2007	In the Valley of the Wolves	Narrator (voice)	Television documentary
2008	Shark Swarm	Bill Girdler	Television film
2008	The Wolf That Changed America	Narrator (voice)	Television documentary
2009	Saving Grace	Matthew	Episode: "What Would You Do?"
2010	Law & Order: Criminal Intent	Dr. Theodore Nichols	Episode: "Three-In-One"
2010	Bored to Death	Professor Richard Hawkes	Episode: "I've Been Living Like a Demented God!"
2011–2014	The Good Wife	Burl Preston	4 episodes
2011, 2012, 2014	Louie	John / Uncle Excelsior / Louie's Dad	3 Episode
2012	Blue Bloods	Leon Goodwin	Episode: "The Job"
2012–2018	Homeland	Dar Adal	39 episodes
2013	Do No Harm	Cozar	Episode: "Six Feet Deep"
2013	Elementary	Daniel Gottlieb	Episode: "A Landmark Story"
2016	Inside Amy Schumer	Diplomat	Episode: "Madame President"
2017	Curb Your Enthusiasm	Himself	Episode: "Fatwa!"
2018	The Good Fight	Burl Preston	Episode: "Day 436"
2019	The Orville	Council Chairman	Episode: "Sanctuary"
2019	Chimerica	Frank Sams	4 episodes
2020–2021	Mythic Quest	C.W. Longbottom	18 episodes
2022	Moon Knight	Khonshu (voice)	5 episodes
2022	Guillermo del Toro's Cabinet of Curiosities	Dr. Carl Winters	Episode: "The Autopsy"
2022	The White Lotus	Bert Di Grasso	7 episodes
2023	White House Plumbers	John Sirica	2 episodes
2025	Marvel Zombies	Khonshu (voice)	2 episodes

== Theatre ==
Year	Title	Role	Venue
1965	The Wonderful Ice Cream Suit		Coronet Theatre
1966–1967	The Fantasticks	The Actor (Henry)	Sullivan Street Playhouse, Off-Broadway
1968–1969	The Man in the Glass Booth	Tzelniker-Rudin	Royale Theatre, Broadway
1969	Tonight in Living Color	Jonathan	Actors' Playhouse, Off-Broadway
1971	The Survival of St. Joan	Performer	Anderson Theatre, Off-Broadway
1971	Where Has Tommy Flowers Gone?	The Men	Eastside Playhouse, Off-Broadway
1972	6 Rms Riv Vu	The Expectant Father	Helen Hayes Theatre, Broadway
1974	Bad Habits	Roy Pitt/Mr. Blum	Astor Place Theatre, Off-Broadway
1974	Bad Habits	Roy Pitt/Mr. Blum	Booth Theatre, Broadway
1975–1976	The Ritz	Chris	Longacre Theatre, Broadway
1976	Legend	Jesse Lymburner	Ethel Barrymore Theatre, Broadway
1976	Sexual Perversity in Chicago; The Duck Variations	Bernard Litko	Cherry Lane Theatre, Off-Broadway
1977	Landscape of the Body	Capt. Holahan	The Public Theater, Off-Broadway
1978	The Master and Margarita	Performer	The Public Theater, Off-Broadway
1979–1980	Teibele and Her Demon	Alchonon	Brooks Atkinson Theatre, Broadway
1980	The Seagull	Yevgeny Dorn	The Public Theater, Off-Broadway
1982	The Caretaker	Davies	23rd Street Theatre, Off-Broadway
1982	Antigone	Creon	The Public Theater, Off-Broadway
1983–1984	Uncle Vanya	Mikhail Astrov	La MaMa Annex
1984	The Golem	Rabbi Judah Leyb	Delacorte Theater, Off-Broadway
1985	The Madwoman of Chaillot	Ragpicker	Theatre at St. Peter's Church, Off-Broadway
1986	Twelfth Night	Malvolio	Delacorte Theater, Off-Broadway
1986–1987	Macbeth	Macbeth	Belasco Theatre, Broadway
1987	A Midsummer Night's Dream	Nick Bottom	The Public Theater, Off-Broadway
1988	Waiting for Godot	Pozzo	Mitzi E. Newhouse Theater, Off-Broadway
1992	A Life in the Theatre	Robert	Jewish Repertory Theatre, Off-Broadway
1994	Angels in America	Roy Cohn	Walter Kerr Theatre, Broadway
1995	A Month in the Country	Ignaty Illyich Shpichelsky	Criterion Center Stage Right, Broadway
1996	King Lear	Lear	The Public Theater, Off-Broadway
1996	Tolstoy	Leo Tolstoy	Aldwych Theatre, West End
1997–1998	Triumph of Love	Hermocrates	Royale Theatre, Broadway
2003	Trumbo: Red White and Blacklisted	Dalton Trumbo	Westside Theatre, Off-Broadway
2006	An Oak Tree	Father	Barrow Street Theatre, Off-Broadway
2007	The Jew of Malta	Barabas	The Duke on 42nd Street, Off-Broadway
2007	The Merchant of Venice	Shylock	The Duke on 42nd Street, Off-Broadway
2007	Mauritius	Sterling	The Biltmore Theatre, Broadway
2008	Almost an Evening	Control/God Who Judges	Bleecker Street Theatre, Off-Broadway
2009	Offices	Cassady/Bum	Linda Gross Theater, Off-Broadway
2011	The Merchant of Venice	Shylock	National Tour
2012	Galileo	Galileo Galilei	Classic Stage Company, Off-Broadway
2012	The Golden Age	Gioacchino Rossini	New York City Center, Off-Broadway
2014	The Threepenny Opera	Jonathan Peachum	Linda Gross Theatre, Off-Broadway
2014–2015	It's Only a Play	Ira Drew	Gerald Schoenfeld Theatre, Broadway
2016	White Rabbit Red Rabbit	Performer	Westside Theatre, Off-Broadway
2016	Nathan the Wise	Nathan	Classic Stage Company, Off-Broadway
2017	The Mentor	Benjamin Rubin	Vaudeville Theatre, West End
2018	Good for Otto	Barnard	Pershing Square Signature Center, Off-Broadway
2023	Gutenberg! The Musical!	Producer (one night only)	James Earl Jones Theatre, Broadway
2024	The Queen of Versailles	David A. Siegel	Emerson Colonial Theatre, Boston
2025	Krapp's Last Tape	Krapp	Irish Repertory Theatre, Off-Broadway
2025	The Queen of Versailles	David A. Siegel	St. James Theatre, Broadway
