= Mystery Fun House =

Attraction complex in Orlando, Florida, United States

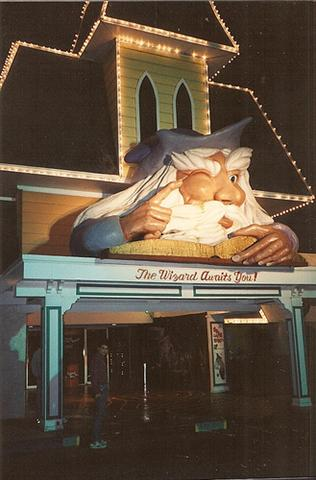
- Mystery Fun House
- Location: Orlando, Florida
- Opened: March 27, 1976
- Closed: February 18, 2001
- Owner: David A. Siegel (1976-2022); Westgate Resorts
- Theme: Funhouse
- Website: Official website (arcade)

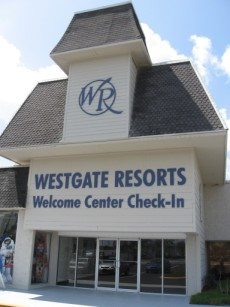
The former Mystery Fun House in 2007.

Mystery Fun House was a family-oriented entertainment complex in Orlando, Florida, United States. Established on March 27, 1976, with the involvement of businessman David A. Siegel, the attraction operated until its closure on February 18, 2001. Located near International Drive on Major Boulevard across from Universal Orlando Resort, Mystery Fun House originally featured a walkthrough fun house experience and later expanded to include additional attractions such as a laser-tag arena, an arcade, a dinosaur-themed miniature golf course, and various other activities.

After closing, the former lobby of the Mystery Fun House was repurposed as a check-in center for Westgate Resorts. Parts of the building, including the entire Starbase Omega attraction were destroyed in 2017 due to Hurricane Irma. As of October 2022, the remaining building and property was razed to make way for condominiums.

In 2025, Westgate Resorts revived the Mystery Fun House name for a successor arcade attraction in Kissimmee, Florida.

== Facilities ==
To promote the 1976 opening of Mystery Fun House, Aaron Fechter's Creative Engineering created an animatronic character called Willie Wabbit to be installed at the Orlando International Airport. Although he never appeared outside of the airport, Willie was a success for the MFH, while also serving as an early influence for the technology behind CEI's Rock-afire Explosion for ShowBiz Pizza Place.

=== Chambers ===
The Fun House consisted of 15 areas called "chambers", including a mirror maze, a rolling barrel, crawl-through tunnels, scary jail areas, a moving bridge and a crooked room. In the early days, there was a multiplex movie theater, a hologram machine, a Disco room with a lighted dance floor, the moon room, and a wall-sized "computer" that could read patrons' handwriting and provide fortunes. There was also a show about three quarters of the way through the Fun House with music, lights, special effects and a video of the Wizard projected on a large screen.

=== Magic Shop ===
The Mystery Fun House Magic Shop was run by veteran magician Dan Stapleton. In the early 1970s, entertainment producer Jackson Hamiter trained under Stapleton and his brother, well known for his "Buxxum Bunnies" card tricks.

=== Starbase Omega ===
Starbase Omega was a laser tag facility added in the late 1980s. Each player was equipped with a reflective target badge, a battery belt pack, and a "laser" gun. To get to Starbase Omega, patrons sat on a transporter that simulated a ride to the planet. Once on the planet—a large, dark room with extra-bouncy carpets and a hovering spaceship—players shot light beams at other players, trying to hit their reflective badges.

=== Mystery Mini Golf / Jurassic Putt ===
Originally called Mystery Mini Golf, Jurassic Putt was an 18-hole, dinosaur-themed miniature golf course that included a dark building for one of the holes.

=== Mystery Fun House Arcade & Restaurant ===
In the mid-1980s, a restaurant and arcade were added to the Mystery Fun House, transforming it into a family entertainment center that included obstacle courses, optical illusions, arcade games, mini-golf, and laser tag. An animatronic show called The WizBangs, featuring retrofitted Chuck E. Cheese's Pizza Time Theatre animatronics, was installed above the restaurant's ordering counter. Another Pizza Time Theatre animatronic, The King, a 9-foot tall lion impersonating Elvis Presley was acquired by Mystery Fun House and placed to the left of the restaurant's ordering counter, adjacent to the WizBangs. Sally Industries supplied the controller equipment and programming for the WizBangs in collaboration with David "Billy Bob" Irvin, the former senior artist and creative designer of Creative Engineering.

== Filming ==
Two movies were filmed at the Mystery Fun House: the birthday scene of Parenthood (1989), and the horror film Night Terror (2002).

== Revival and successor attraction ==
In 2025, Westgate Resorts reopened the Mystery Fun House name as the Mystery Fun House Arcade Experience, a modern arcade attraction located at Westgate Vacation Villas Resort in Kissimmee, Florida. Unlike the original walk-through fun house that operated in Orlando from 1976 to 2001, the new venue functions primarily as a large-scale arcade and entertainment center.

The 21,000-square-foot facility includes more than 100 arcade games, combining retro and contemporary machines, as well as sports simulators, neon bowling lanes, and food and retail offerings. The arcade includes a themed area known as Chuck's Arcade, featuring classic games such as pinball machines, Pac-Man, and Skee-Ball, alongside a Chuck E. Cheese Fun Zone designed for younger visitors.

The venue incorporates references to the original Mystery Fun House through themed décor and exhibits. A section called Mystery Lane displays artifacts from the historic attraction and functions as a museum-style walkthrough connecting the modern arcade to its predecessor. The character known as the Wizard, featured in the original attraction, is retained as a guiding narrative element within the experience.
