= The Queen of Versailles =

- Film poster
- Directed by: Lauren Greenfield
- Produced by: Lauren Greenfield; Danielle Renfrew Behrens
- Starring: Jackie Siegel; David A. Siegel
- Cinematography: Tom Hurwitz
- Edited by: Victor Livingston
- Music by: Jeff Beal
- Production company: Evergreen Pictures
- Distributed by: Magnolia Pictures
- Release dates: January 19, 2012 (Sundance); July 20, 2012 (United States)
- Running time: 100 minutes
- Country: United States
- Language: English
- Box office: $2.4 million

The Queen of Versailles is a 2012 American documentary film by Lauren Greenfield. The film depicts Jackie Siegel and David Siegel, owners of Westgate Resorts, and their family as they build their private residence—Versailles, one of the largest and most expensive single-family houses in the United States—and the crisis they face as the US economy declines.

== Synopsis ==
David Siegel is the wealthy owner of Westgate Resorts, a timeshare company in Florida. His wife Jackie Siegel, thirty years his junior, was the winner of the Mrs. Florida pageant in 1993. They begin construction on the Versailles house, a vast mansion named after the Palace of Versailles. Located on the outskirts of Orlando, it would be one of the largest single-family detached homes in the United States if completed (the largest being North Carolina's Biltmore Estate at 178,926 square feet).

However, Siegel's company is badly affected by the Great Recession in 2008, and his family struggles to cope with their reduced income. Construction on the new house is halted, most of their household staff is laid off, and their pets are neglected. David retreats into his office, determined to save his Las Vegas property venture, PH Towers. Jackie struggles to rein in her compulsive shopping habits. The children and their nanny are also interviewed. The film ends with none of their issues resolved.

== Reception ==
The film was reviewed positively. The film-critics aggregator Rotten Tomatoes reported 95% of critics gave a positive review, with an average score of 8/10 and the consensus, "The Queen of Versailles is a timely, engaging, and richly drawn portrait of the American Dream improbably composed of equal parts compassion and schadenfreude." The New York Times' A. O. Scott called the film "A gaudy guilty pleasure that is also a piece of trenchant social criticism", and said,

the movie starts out in the mode of reality television, resembling the pilot for a new Real Housewives franchise or a reboot of Lifestyles of the Rich and Famous. Before long, though, it takes on the coloration of a Theodore Dreiser novel – not quite an American tragedy but a sprawling, richly detailed study of ambition, desire and the wild swings of fortune that are included in the price of the capitalist ticket.

The Economist called it "an uncomfortably intimate glimpse of a couple's struggle with a harsh new reality," concluding that "the film's great achievement is that it invites both compassion and Schadenfreude. What could have been merely a silly send-up manages to be a meditation on marriage and a metaphor for the fragility of fortunes, big and small." AllMovie gave the film four stars out of five.

== Awards ==
The documentary won the US Directing Award at the 2012 Sundance Film Festival, the Grand Jury Prize from the Brisbane International Film Festival, and a Best Director Award from the RiverRun Film Festival. The Queen of Versailles was also nominated for Best Documentary Film, 2012, by the International Documentary Association (IDA). It was broadcast on BBC Four as part of the Storyville series.

It was also nominated for the Critics' Choice Movie Award for Best Documentary Feature at the 18th Critics' Choice Award.

== Lawsuit ==
In January 2012, before the film's premiere at the Sundance Film Festival, David Siegel filed a civil action based on the way the film had been described in promotional materials.

On January 24, 2013, the United States District Court, Middle District of Florida, stayed the suit pending arbitration. Siegel claimed Lauren Greenfield had not obtained a proper release from the subjects of the film, in particular, David Siegel and Westgate Resorts. In staying the lawsuit, Judge Anne C. Conway found David Siegel's testimony to be "inconsistent and incredible and thus lacking weight." She disagreed with Siegel's position, which she deemed to be "quite bizarre" in light of his subsequent conduct. Directing that the case be administratively closed, Conway ordered the defendants to file and serve, on or before May 1, 2013, and every three months after that, a status report regarding the arbitration proceedings.

The subsequent arbitration was heard by Roy Rifkin of the Independent Film and Television Alliance in July 2013. On March 13, 2014, he returned his ruling that the film was not defamatory. He elaborated, "having viewed the supposedly egregious portions of the Motion Picture numerous times, [the arbitrator] simply does not find that any of the content of the Motion Picture was false." Furthermore, he wrote that "There is nothing taken away by the viewer of the Motion Picture that is inconsistent with the fundamental reality that the global recession created a crisis for Westgate causing it to have to reluctantly give up its interest in PH Towers," and "To a great extent this is derived from the words of David, Jackie, and Richard Siegel themselves. Perhaps the clearest example of this is David referring to the story being told as a 'rags-to-riches-to-rags story.'" Lastly, Rifkin found that Westgate failed to show how it was damaged from the documentary, saying that the company "did not remotely establish the type of malice required for a defamation claim on behalf of a public figure." He subsequently ordered David Siegel and Westgate Resorts to pay the filmmakers $750,000 for legal fees.

== Aftermath ==
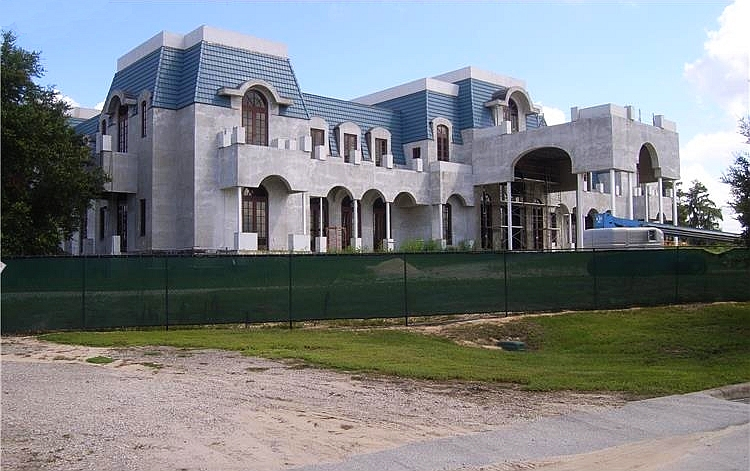
Versailles house

As Westgate Resorts' finances have improved since 2013, Siegel would own the Versailles property outright. Construction has resumed, but as of 2025 is still not complete. Expected to be valued at over $100 million, the project will be the fourth most expensive house in the United States. David Siegel and Westgate Resorts continued to operate a timeshare business, but without the PH Towers featured in the documentary. As a privately held enterprise, it is unknown how much of the $1.2 billion in debt Westgate Resorts continues to owe its lenders (originally reported by Businessweek on March 15, 2012). David Siegel later died in April 2025.

== Stage musical adaptation ==
The documentary was adapted into a stage musical, also called The Queen of Versailles, with music by Stephen Schwartz, that premiered in Boston, Massachusetts, in 2024 starring Kristin Chenoweth and F. Murray Abraham. The musical moved to Broadway in 2025.
