= Aaron Kirman =

American real estate agent

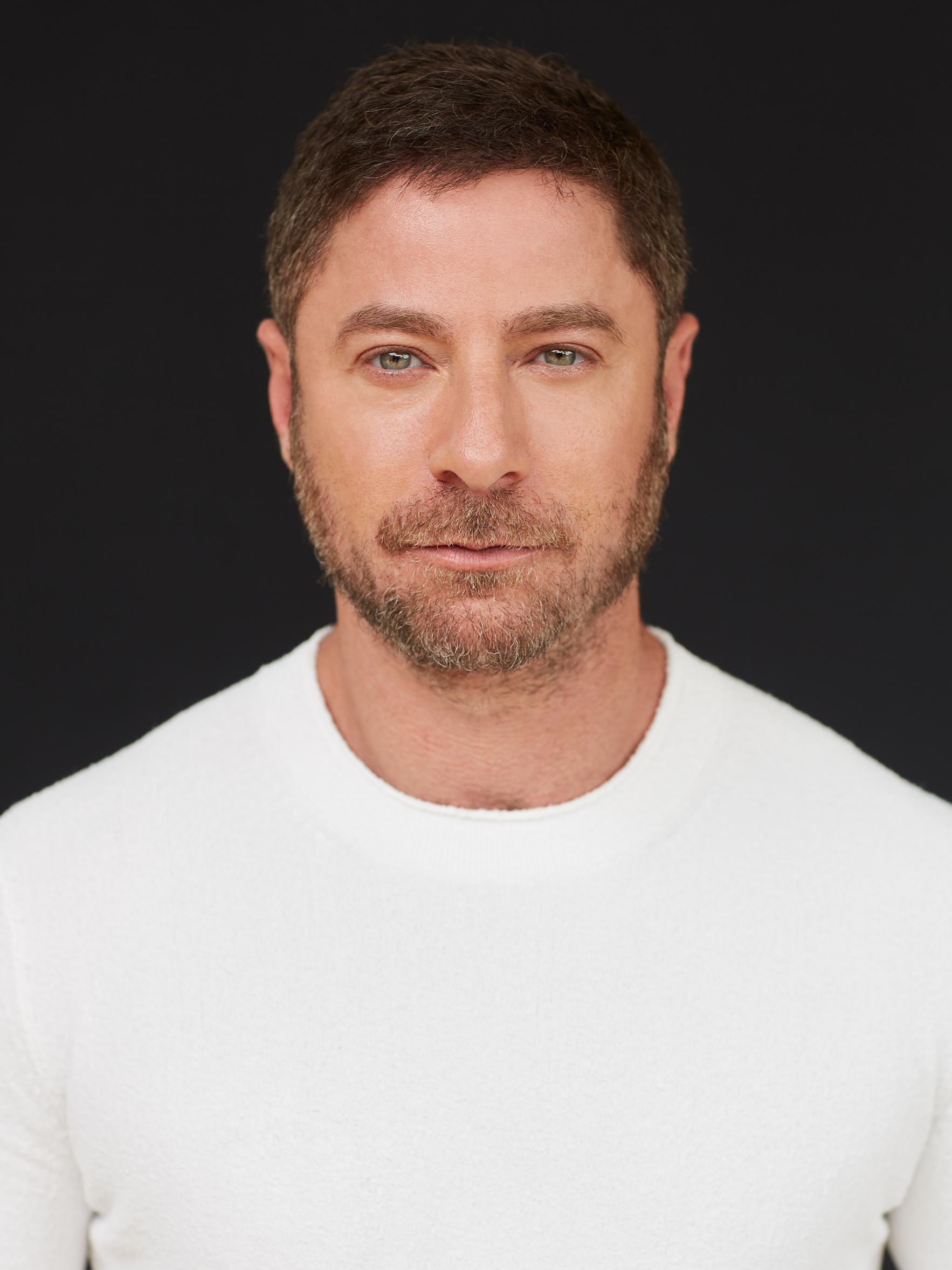
- Born: September 24, 1978; Encino, California, U.S.
- Education: University of Southern California
- Occupation: Real estate agent
- Known for: Contributor to Secret Lives of the Super Rich

Aaron Kirman is a Los Angeles-based real estate agent and investor who appears regularly on CNBC's Secret Lives of the Super Rich and stars on CNBC's real estate reality series Listing Impossible.

== Early life ==
Kirman grew up in Encino, California. His father was in trucking and his mother was a teacher. He attended the University of Southern California, and graduated with a degree in business and communications.

== Real estate ==
At age 19, while in college at the University of Southern California, Kirman began doing his first real estate deals.

Since then, Kirman was executive director of the architectural division at real estate brokerage, Hilton & Hyland, then moved on to his position at the John Aaroe Group. As of 2018, he is president of Pacific Union Luxury Estates Division. In 2019 he was named Compass' president of international estates and added properties in Orange County, Northern California and Italy to his listings. In 2022, Aaron became the Founder and CEO of his own brokerage, Christie's International Real Estate Southern California.

Kirman also stars in the CNBC reality show, Listing Impossible. The program centers around Kirman and his associates selling multi-million dollar homes and estates.

Kirman averages $300 million to $400 million in home sales, has roughly $19 billion in lifetime home sales and is president of Aaroe Estates, the luxury property division of the John Aaroe Group. In 2018, the John Aaroe Group, with International and Partners Trust were rebranded as Pacific Union International (acquired by real estate technology company Compass); Kirman was named president of Pacific Union Luxury Estates Division and was named Compass' president of international estates.

In 2022, Kirman sold "The One" which was once America's most expensive home for $126 million. Also, in 2022, sold George Ruan's, Los Angeles mansion for around $112 million—one of the biggest deals to ever close in L.A.

In 2024, Kirman argued that Beverly Hills, an extremely affluent neighborhood characterized by lavish mansions, does not have sufficient land for affordable housing. He was also involved in 2 of the 7 deals over $100M in 2024 in LA.
