= The Wonderful Ice Cream Suit and Other Plays =

Book by Ray Bradbury

- First edition
- Author: Ray Bradbury
- Language: English
- Genre: Fantasy, Horror, Supernatural
- Publisher: Bantam Books
- Publication date: 1972
- Publication place: United States
- Media type: Print (Paperback)
- Pages: xiv+161
- OCLC: 762965

The Wonderful Ice Cream Suit and Other Plays is a collection of three plays by Ray Bradbury: The Wonderful Ice Cream Suit, The Veldt, and To the Chicago Abyss. All are adaptations of his short stories by the same names. The play The Wonderful Ice Cream Suit debuted in 1958 and was adapted into a 1998 film by Touchstone Pictures.

F Murray Abraham made his professional stage debut in a 1965 production of The Wonderful Ice Cream Suit.
