= List of awards and nominations received by F. Murray Abraham =

F. Murray Abraham awards and nominations
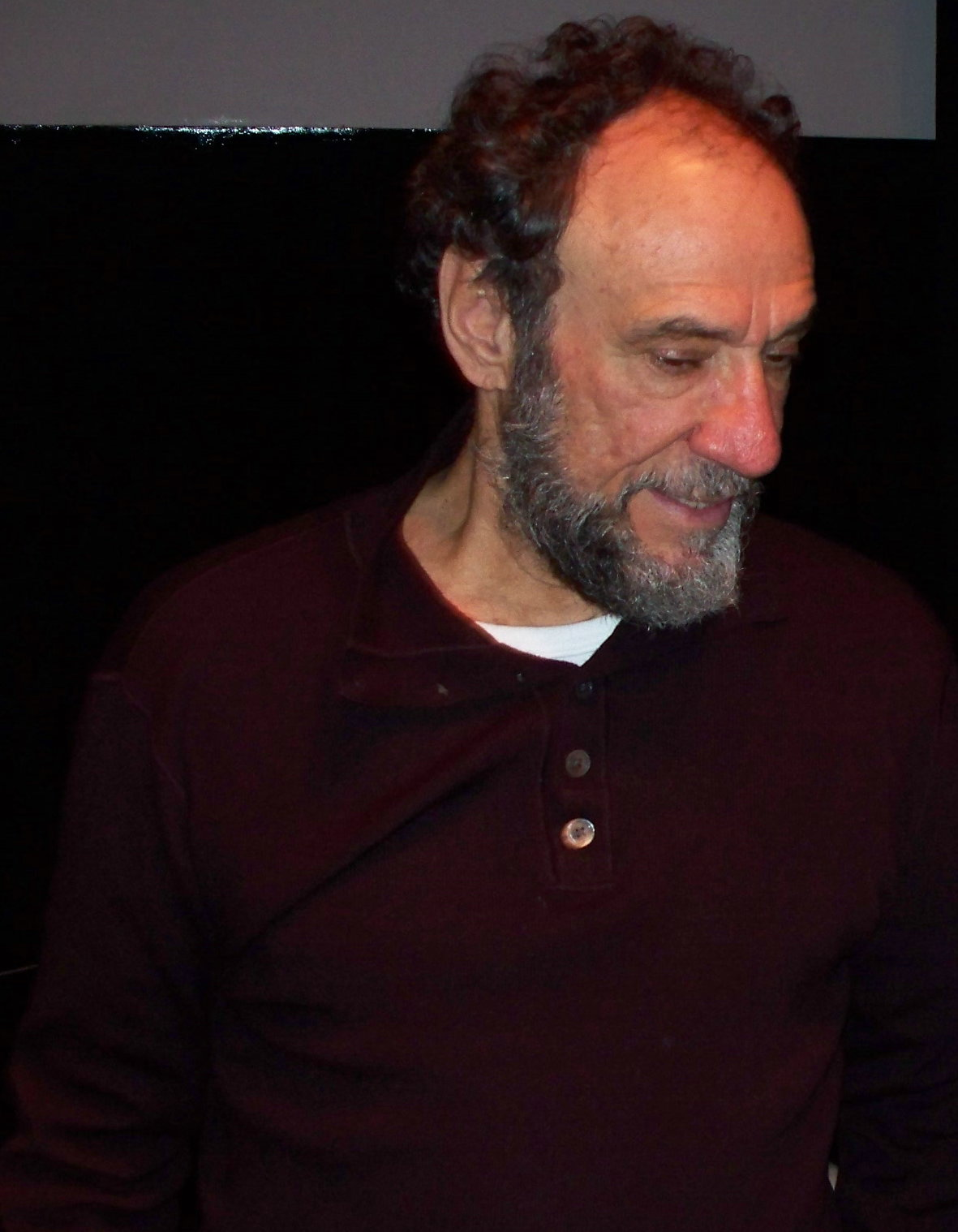
Awards and nominations
Award	Wins	Nominations
Academy Awards	1	1
BAFTA Awards	0	1
Emmy Awards	0	4
Golden Globe Awards	1	2
Grammy Awards	0	1
SAG Awards	1	4

Totals (Note: Certain award groups do not simply award one winner. They acknowledge several different recipients, have runners-up, and have third place. Since this is a specific recognition and is different from losing an award, runner-up mentions are considered wins in this award tally. For simplification and to avoid errors, each award in this list has been presumed to have had a prior nomination.)
- Wins: 9
- Nominations: 26

F. Murray Abraham is an American actor known for his roles on stage and screen. Over his career he has received an Academy Award, a Golden Globe Award and a Screen Actors Guild Award as well as nominations for a BAFTA Awards and four Emmy Awards, and a Grammy Award.

Abraham received the Academy Award for Best Actor for his portrayal of Antonio Salieri in the 1984 period biographical drama film Amadeus, a performance that also earned him a BAFTA Award for Best Actor nomination and a Golden Globe Award for Best Actor. He was nominated for a Critics' Choice Movie Award and a Screen Actors Guild Award for the comedy-drama film The Grand Budapest Hotel (2014).

On television, he played Dar Adal in the Showtime espionage thriller series Homeland (2012–18), for which he was nominated for two Primetime Emmy Awards for Outstanding Guest Actor in a Drama Series, and Bert Di Grasso, an elderly flirtatious grandfather on the second season of the HBO anthology series The White Lotus (2022), that earned him nominations for the Golden Globe Award for Best Supporting Actor – Series, Miniseries or Television Film and the Primetime Emmy Award for Outstanding Supporting Actor in a Drama Series.

His work on the stage has earned him two Obie Awards for revivals of Anton Chekov's Uncle Vanya (1986) and William Shakespeare's The Merchant of Venice (2011). He was also nominated for three Drama Desk Awards. He has also been nominated for a Grammy Award.

== Major associations ==
=== Academy Awards ===
Year	Category	Nominated work	Result	Ref.
1985	Best Actor	Amadeus	Won	

=== BAFTA Awards ===
Year	Category	Nominated work	Result	Ref.
British Academy Film Awards
1986	Best Actor in a Leading Role	Amadeus	Nominated	

=== Emmy Awards ===
Year	Category	Nominated work	Result	Ref.
Primetime Emmy Awards
2015	Outstanding Guest Actor in a Drama Series	Homeland (episode: "Long Time Coming")	Nominated	
2018	Outstanding Guest Actor in a Drama Series	Homeland (episode: "All In")	Nominated	
2022	Outstanding Character Voice-Over Performance	Moon Knight (episode: "The Friendly Type")	Nominated	
2023	Outstanding Supporting Actor in a Drama Series	The White Lotus (episode: "Abductions")	Nominated	

=== Golden Globe Awards ===
Year	Category	Nominated work	Result	Ref.
1985	Best Actor in a Motion Picture – Drama	Amadeus	Won	
2023	Best Supporting Actor in a Miniseries or Television Film	The White Lotus	Nominated	

=== Grammy Awards ===
Year	Category	Nominated work	Result	Ref.
1987	Best Spoken Word Album	Interview with the Vampire	Nominated	

=== Screen Actors Guild Awards ===
Year	Category	Nominated work	Result	Ref.
2014	Outstanding Ensemble in a Drama Series	Homeland	Nominated	
2015	Outstanding Cast in a Motion Picture	The Grand Budapest Hotel	Nominated	
2016	Outstanding Ensemble in a Drama Series	Homeland	Nominated	
2023	Outstanding Ensemble in a Drama Series	The White Lotus	Won	

== Theatre awards ==
Year	Organization	Category	Nominated work	Result	Ref.
1980	Drama Desk Awards	Outstanding Actor in a Play	Teibele and Her Demon	Nominated	
1992	Drama Desk Awards	Outstanding Actor in a Play	A Life in the Theatre	Nominated	
2015	Drama Desk Awards	Outstanding Featured Actor in a Play	It's Only a Play	Nominated	
1984	Obie Awards	Best Performance	Uncle Vanya	Won	
2011	Obie Awards	Sustained Excellence of Performance	The Merchant of Venice	Won	
2025	Outer Critics Circle Awards	Outstanding Lead Performer in an Off-Broadway Play	Beckett Briefs: From the Cradle to the Grave	Pending	

== Critics awards ==
Year	Organization	Category	Nominated work	Result	Ref.
1984	Los Angeles Film Critics Association	Best Actor	Amadeus	Won (Note: Tied with Albert Finney for Under the Volcano.)	
2014	Critics' Choice Movie Awards	Best Acting Ensemble	The Grand Budapest Hotel	Nominated	
2014	Detroit Film Critics Society	Best Ensemble	The Grand Budapest Hotel	Won (Note: Tied with the casts of Birdman and Guardians of the Galaxy.)	
2014	Florida Film Critics Circle	Best Ensemble	The Grand Budapest Hotel	Won	
2014	San Diego Film Critics Society	Best Ensemble	The Grand Budapest Hotel	Nominated	
2014	Washington D.C. Area Film Critics Association	Best Acting by an Ensemble	The Grand Budapest Hotel	Nominated	
2015	Georgia Film Critics Association	Best Ensemble	The Grand Budapest Hotel	Won	
