= Jackie Siegel =

American socialite and model (born 1966)

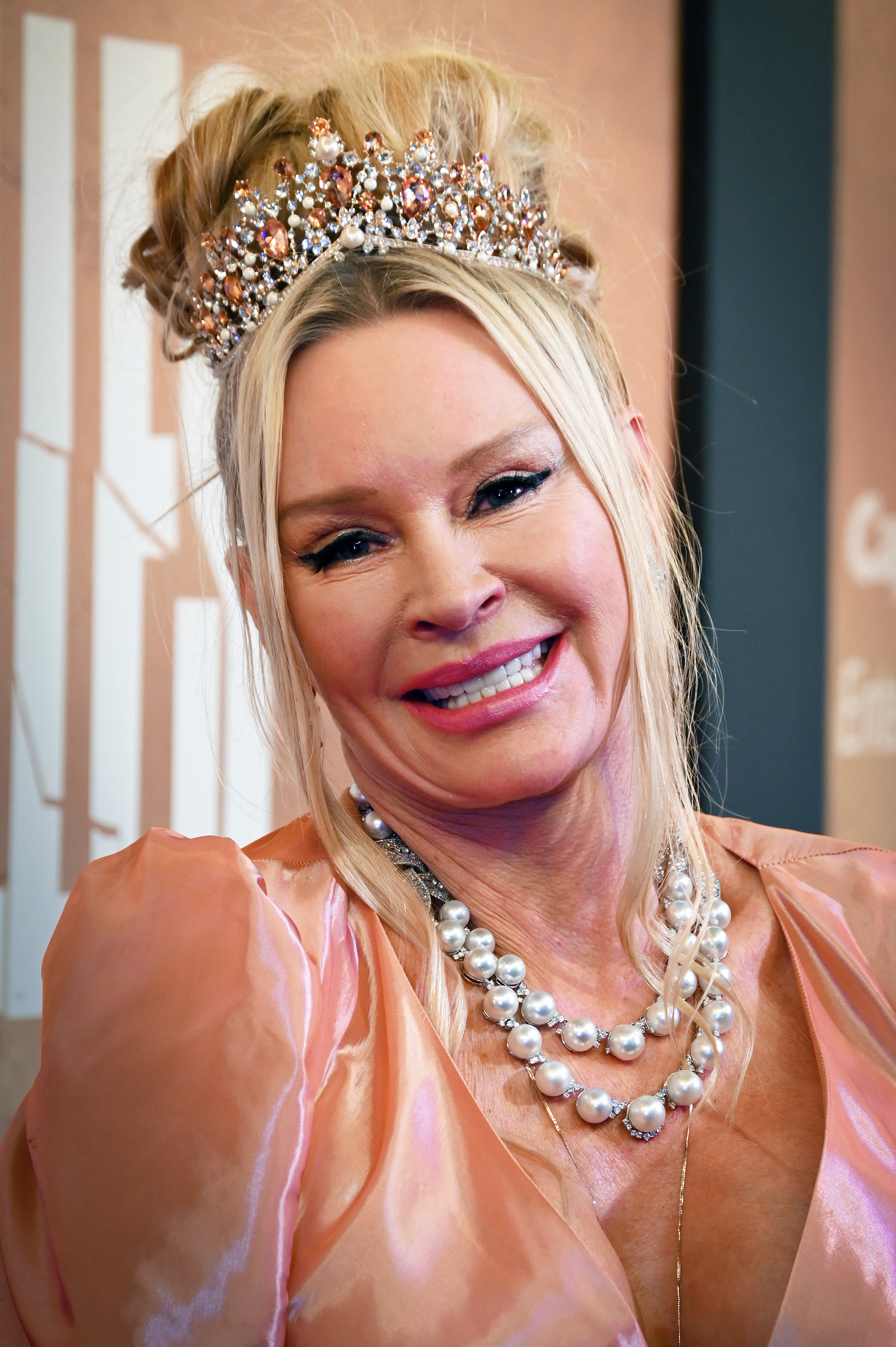
- Siegel in 2025
- Born: Jacqueline Mallery; January 19, 1966 (age 60)
- Education: Rochester Institute of Technology (BS, 1989)
- Occupations: Model; actress; beauty pageant contest director
- Known for: The Queen of Versailles
- Board member of: Westgate Resorts; Ocoee Thrift Mart
- Spouse: David A. Siegel (m. 2000; died 2025)
- Children: 8
- Website: Official website

Jacqueline Siegel (née Mallery; born January 19, 1966) is an American socialite, model, actress, and beauty pageant director. She is one of the main subjects of the 2012 documentary film The Queen of Versailles, directed by Lauren Greenfield, its sequel series, Queen of Versailles Reigns Again, and the 2024 stage musical The Queen of Versailles with Kristin Chenoweth originating the role of Jackie.

== Early life ==
Siegel, born Jacqueline Mallery to John and Deborah Mallery, was raised in Endwell, New York and graduated from the Rochester Institute of Technology in 1989 with a bachelor's degree in computer engineering technology.

== Career ==
In 1993, she won the Mrs. Florida America beauty pageant. She now owns the Mrs. Florida America beauty pageant contest and serves as its director.

Siegel is on the board of directors of Westgate Resorts and Ocoee Thrift Mart, a store selling used goods that she owns and founded and which donates some of its profits to charity. She also founded the charity Locals Helping Locals.

Siegel was featured in an episode of ABC's Celebrity Wife Swap in June 2015.

The television series Queen of Versailles Reigns Again, which continues the story of the house and Siegel family, started airing on the Discovery+ streaming service in Spring 2022. The series moved to HBO Max in December 2022.

== Personal life ==
Siegel was the wife of Westgate Resorts owner David Siegel until his death in April 2025. They married in a Jewish ceremony in 2000, and had eight children together, including her adopted niece, Jonquil, who came to live with them after her mother died, and one daughter from a previous relationship, Victoria. Their other children are: David, Daniel, Debbie, Drew, and twins, Jacqueline and Jordan. Her daughter Victoria died of a drug overdose at age 18 in June 2015. Three days following her husband's death in April 2025, Siegel's sister Jessica died at the age of 43 after using cocaine that was laced with fentanyl.

== Filmography ==
Year	Title	Self	Producer	Actress	Notes
2002	Night Terror	No	No	Yes	Alexa
2011	My Trip to the Dark Side	No	No	Yes	
2012	The Queen of Versailles	Yes	No	No	
2013	Anderson Live	Yes	No	No	
2013	Watch What Happens: Live	Yes	No	No	
2013	The Magician	No	No	Yes	Jennifer
2015	Celebrity Wife Swap	Yes	No	No	
2015	The Martial Arts Kid	Yes	No	No	
2015	Bob Massi Is the Property Man	Yes	No	No	2 episodes
2015	Let Me Out	No	Yes	Yes	Jenifer
2015	The Hotwives of Las Vegas	Yes	No	Yes	
2016	Monsters Anonymous	No	Yes	Yes	Therapist
2017	Jinek	Yes	No	No	
2017	Flipping Out	Yes	No	No	2 episodes
2018	Fireball Run Big Country	Yes	No	No	
2018	Generation Wealth	Yes	No	No	
2019	The Doctors	Yes	No	No	
2019	Below Deck Mediterranean	Yes	No	No	2 episodes
2020	Motherhood Unstressed	Yes	No	No	
2020	Shooting Heroin	No	No	Yes	Concerned mother
2021	Below Deck	Yes	No	No	2 episodes
2022	Queen of Versailles Reigns Again	Yes	No	No	12 episodes
