= The Queen of Versailles (musical) =

Stage musical by Stephen Schwartz

- Boston theatre windowcard
- Music: Stephen Schwartz
- Lyrics: Stephen Schwartz
- Book: Lindsey Ferrentino
- Basis: The Queen of Versailles by Lauren Greenfield
- Premiere: July 16, 2024: Emerson Colonial Theatre
- Productions: 2024 Boston; 2025 Broadway

The Queen of Versailles is a musical with a score by Stephen Schwartz and a book by Lindsey Ferrentino. The musical is based on the 2012 documentary directed by Lauren Greenfield about Jackie and David Siegel, the owners of Westgate Resorts, who were then building a gigantic mansion in central Florida that they named Versailles. Beyond the events of the documentary film, the musical incorporates additional incidents in the lives of the Siegel family, including some that occurred after the documentary's release.

The musical premiered in Boston, Massachusetts, at Emerson Colonial Theatre in July and August 2024, starring Kristin Chenoweth and F. Murray Abraham. Both reprised their roles in a Broadway production at the St. James Theatre, which began in previews October 8, 2025, opened on November 9, and closed on December 21, 2025.

== Synopsis ==
=== Act I ===
The musical begins with depictions of events in the history of the French royal court of Louis XIV at Versailles in the late 18th century ("Because I Can"; "Because We Can"). Jackie Mallery grows up middle-class in a small town, with supportive parents Debbie and John, and has dreams of becoming rich and successful someday ("Caviar Dreams"). Jackie graduates from college with a computer engineering degree and moves to New York where she meets her first husband ("Keep on Thrustin'"). She marries and moves with her first husband to the Everglades in Florida, but the marriage turns abusive. While pregnant, she wins the Mrs. Florida America beauty pageant, scraping together enough money to move out ("Mrs. Florida").

Jackie and her newborn daughter Victoria move into a small apartment ("Each and Every Day"). She meets the much older David Siegel, a real estate developer nicknamed "The Timeshare King", who is the founder and owner of Westgate Resorts ("The Ballad of the Timeshare King"). David marries Jackie and takes her and Victoria in ("Trust Me"). Ambitious, optimistic and warm, but naive, Jackie, together with David, pursues a life of luxury and celebrity; they have several children, cared for by their nanny Sofia and a staff of household employees. Two years after the wedding, they travel to the Palace of Versailles (interspersed with appearances from the 18th-century French court); Jackie decides to build a replica in Florida ("The Golden Hour").

Jackie and David begin to build a $100 million 90,000-square-foot dream mansion in Windermere, Florida. As Jackie lives a glamorous life, Victoria grows unhappy, comparing herself unfavorably to Jackie's pretty socialite friends ("Pretty Wins"). The family takes in Jackie's niece Jonquil Peed, who grew up in poverty but quickly picks up Jackie's taste for fancy trappings ("I Could Get Used to This"). The Great Recession strikes, the housing bubble bursts, and the 2008 financial crisis nearly bankrupts Jackie and David as Westgate Resorts faces immense financial strain. The Siegels are chided by the French court ("Crash"). Construction on Versailles House has halted, and the entire staff is let go, other than Sofia and the Siegels' longtime driver Ray, but Jackie remains optimistic ("This Is Not the Way").

=== Act II ===
Despite the family's troubles, Jackie idolizes Marie Antoinette ("The Royal We"). The family sells their belongings at a garage sale ("Show 'Em You're the Queen") and moves back into their older, smaller house. Jackie discovers that neither Victoria nor Jonquil have fed their pet lizard, who is now dead ("Pavane for a Dead Lizard"). Jackie struggles to control her spending addiction ("Watch"). Victoria is increasingly depressed, and notes this in her diary ("The Book of Random"). Following a visit to Jackie's parents' house, Victoria suggests selling both Versailles and the smaller Siegel house and moving into a smaller home, which Jackie rejects ("Little Houses"). In the meantime, David focuses single-mindedly on saving his real estate empire; he has a strained relationship with his son Gary, who he brings into the business. After a documentary about the family and the Versailles House is released in 2012, Jackie appears in a series of product endorsements to raise money.

The family's fortunes eventually recover, and they avert bankruptcy ("Higher than Ever"). Tragedy strikes the family when Victoria, at age 18, dies of an accidental drug overdose in 2015. In the aftermath, Jackie seemingly has reassessed her priorities ("Grow the Light"), but this turns out to be short-lived. The mansion is finally completed, but Jackie and David feel a sense of loss and question the value of their pursuit of wealth, fame and the American Dream. The French court chides the Siegels again ("Crash"). Jackie stands on Versailles' stairs alone after all the workers, David, and Jonquil leave for various reasons ("This Time Next Year").

== Productions ==
=== Boston (2024) ===
The musical premiered at Emerson Colonial Theatre in Boston, Massachusetts, on July 16, with an opening night on August 1, and ran there until August 25, 2024. It starred Kristin Chenoweth as Jackie Siegel and F. Murray Abraham as David A. Siegel with direction by Michael Arden and choreography by Lauren Yalango-Grant and Christopher Cree Grant. In Variety, Bob Verini called the show Chenoweth's "richest opportunity to date to flex her dramatic muscles [and] the most emotionally affecting score, bar none, of [Schwartz's] long career"; he praised the musical's "sociopolitical critique", other cast members and the designers. Other reviews were mostly positive, but less enthusiastic was the review by Cameron Kelsall in TheaterMania.

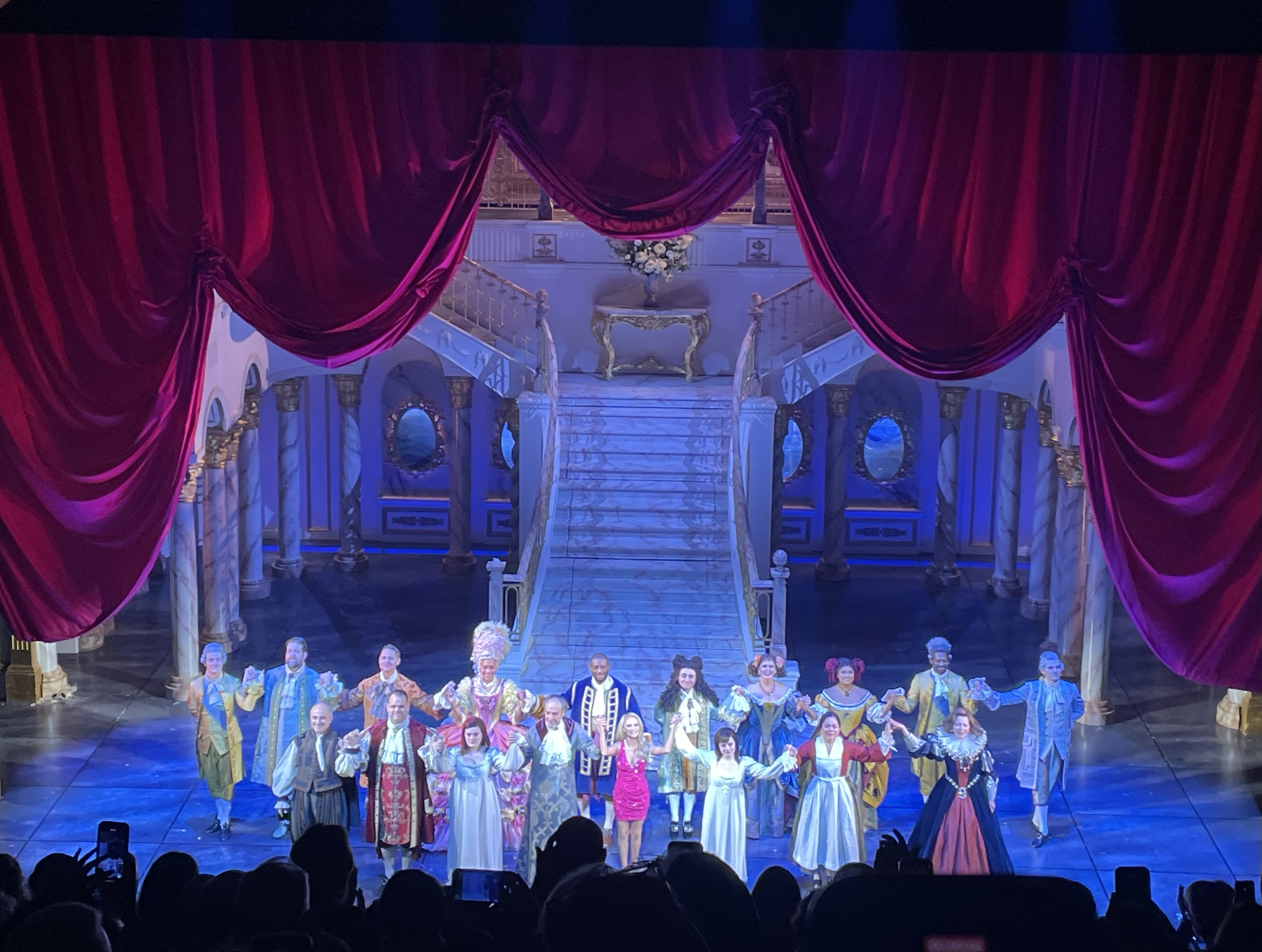
Closing night curtain call at the St. James Theatre on December 21, 2025.

=== Broadway (2025) ===
A Broadway production began previews at the St. James Theatre on October 8, 2025, with opening night on November 9, starring the same cast as in Boston. Chenoweth also was a producer. Arden again directed, with the Grants choreographing. Designers were Dane Laffrey (sets), Christian Cowan (costumes), Natasha Katz (lighting) and Peter Hylenski (sound). Critical reception was mediocre. Though the show sold out during its first four previews, attendance afterward was weak. By early December, 26 percent of the seats were unsold, and weekly box office grosses fell from a high of $1 million to below $700,000. The production closed on December 21, 2025, after 32 previews and 49 regular performances.

== Reception ==
Reviews of the Broadway production were mixed-to-negative; while most critics found the book unfocused and some judged the score lacking in cohesion, many praised Chenoweth and some of the songs, and some praised other cast members. Vulture reviewer Sara Holdren called it "the confused, contorted product of a set of absolutely incompatible impulses", and Adam Feldman of Time Out magazine felt the storyline lacked a cohesive point of view. Holdren and Entertainment Weekly reviewer Dalton Ross both regarded The Queen of Versailles as having tried to accomplish too many things simultaneously, while Feldman and Associated Press reviewer Mark Kennedy found aspects of the production to be incomplete. Aramide Tinubu in Variety praised the cast performances but considered the storyline ill-suited for a Broadway production, and Los Angeles Times writer Charles McNulty, while praising Chenoweth's performance, stated that the musical relied too much on her "star power" and that the book focused exclusively on Victoria and Jonquil. David Finkle of the New York Stage Review gave The Queen of Versailles 2 out of 5 stars, calling the first act boring, though he did praise the casting; he also wrote that the score sometimes "resorts to the downright silly".

The New York Times critic Laura Collins-Hughes (who had seen the Boston production) praised Chenoweth's and White's performances, and she also said that Act II, particularly the events around Victoria's death, had been improved since the Boston tryout. Chris Jones of the New York Daily News similarly liked Chenoweth's "singular combo of raw determination and ... beguilingly empathetic commitment to veracity". Other positive reviews came from the Chicago Tribune, whose reviewer praised Chenoweth's performance and described The Queen of Versailles as a "huge, morally complicated show", and Bob Venini's 4-of-5-starred review in the New York Stage Review, which stated that "Kristin Chenoweth rules in the role of a lifetime as a true believer in the American Dream. ... Schwartz’s score [is] perhaps the most heartfelt, varied and robust of his career". Robert Hofler of TheWrap gave the musical a "thumbs-up review", praising Chenoweth's performance and the music and lyrics, though he thought the book was overly long.

Several reviewers also noted similarities between the construction the Versailles House and the ornate ballroom at the White House by Donald Trump. After the Broadway production's closure was announced, USA Today wrote that some observers had criticized the musical because of the Siegel family's support of Trump, whose policies have targeted demographics that overlapped significantly with the Broadway theatrical fanbase. Hofler said The Queen of Versailles had been nicknamed the "MAGA Musical".

== Characters and original cast ==
Character	Boston and Broadway
Character	2024 and 2025
Jackie Siegel	Kristin Chenoweth
David A. Siegel	F. Murray Abraham
Victoria Siegel	Nina White
Jonquil Peed	Tatum Grace Hopkins
Gary Siegel	Greg Hildreth
Sofia Flores	Melody Butiu
John Mallery	Stephen DeRosa
Debbie Mallery	Isabel Keating
Ray	David Aron Damane
Louis XIV	Pablo David Laucerica
Marie Antoinette	Cassondra James

- Sherie Rene Scott appeared in three Broadway performances as Jackie.

== Musical numbers ==
Act I

- "Because I Can" – Louis XIV and The French Court
- "Because We Can" – Company
- "Caviar Dreams" – Jackie
- "Keep on Thrustin'" – Jackie and Company †
- "Mrs. Florida" – Pageant Host and Company
- "Each and Every Day" – Jackie
- "The Ballad of the Timeshare King" – Gary, David and Company
- "Trust Me" – David
- "The Golden Hour" – Louis XIV, The French Court and Jackie
- "Pretty Wins" – Victoria
- "I Could Get Used to This" – Jonquil, Jackie and Company
- "Crash" – Louis XIV and The French Court
- "This Is Not the Way" – Jackie

Act II

- "The Royal We" – Marie Antoinette and Jackie
- "Show 'Em You're the Queen" – Jackie and Company
- "Pavane for a Dead Lizard" – Victoria and Jonquil
- "Watch" – Jackie and Company
- "The Book of Random" – Victoria
- "Little Houses" – John, Debbie, Jackie, Sofia, Victoria, and Jonquil
- "Higher than Ever" – Company
- "Grow the Light" – Jackie
- "Crash (Reprise 1793)" – Louis XIV, Marie Antoinette and The French Court
- "I Could Get Used to This" (reprise) – Jonquil
- "This Time Next Year" – Jackie

†=Not on the Broadway cast recording

=== Cast recording ===
The Queen of Versailles (Original Broadway Cast Recording) was released digitally on April 3, 2026. A CD version was released on May 29, 2026.

== Awards and nominations ==
=== 2025 Broadway production ===
Year	Award	Category	Work	Result	Ref.
2026	Dorian Award	Outstanding Original Score of a Broadway Production	Stephen Schwartz	Pending	
2026	Dorian Award	Outstanding Lead Performance in a Broadway Musical	Kristin Chenoweth	Pending	
