= Funhouse =

Amusement facility

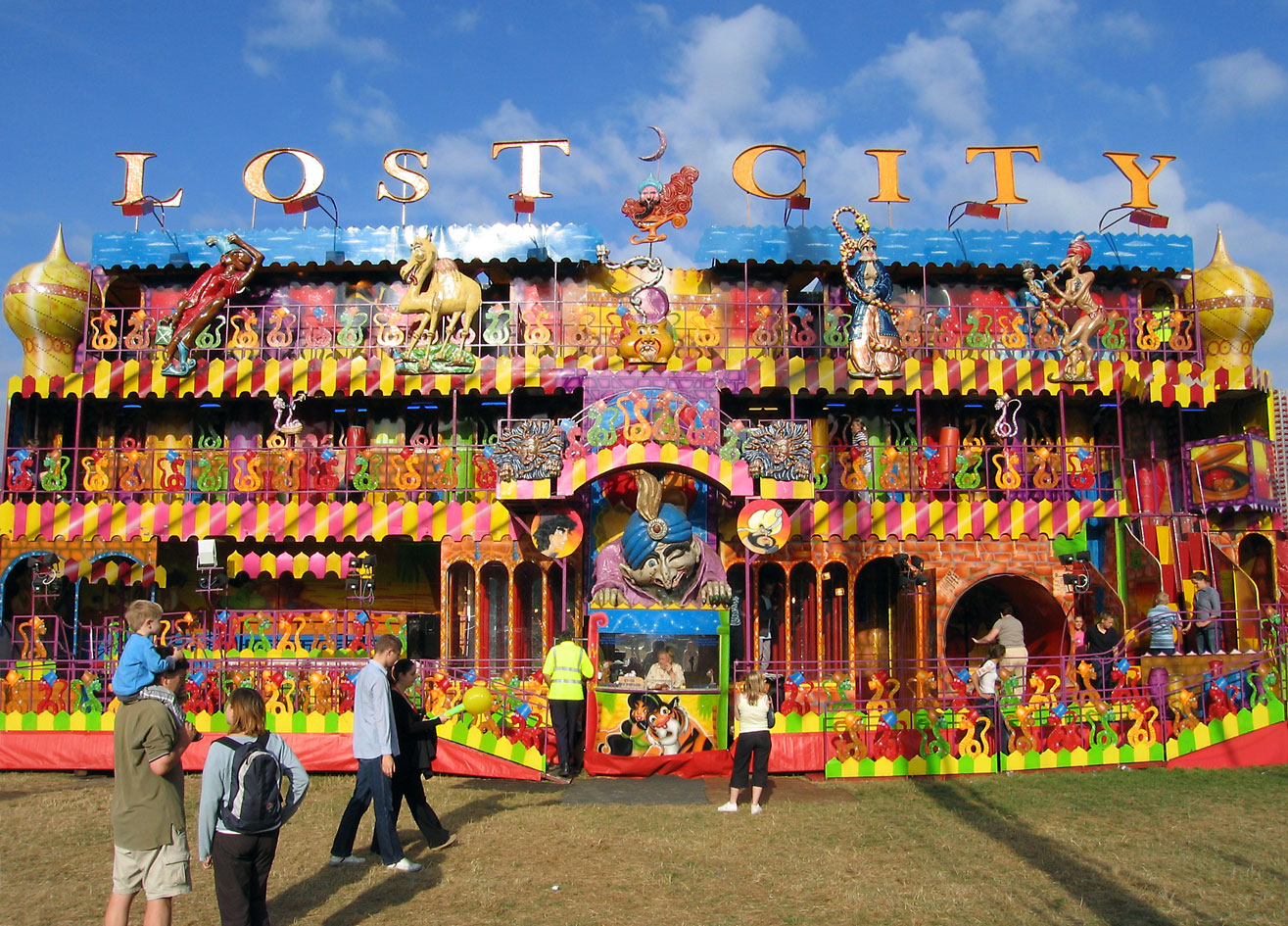
Lost City – a large traveling funhouse that unpacks from two articulated trailers

A funhouse or fun house is an attraction found in amusement parks and funfair midways, equipped with various devices designed to surprise, challenge, or amuse visitors. Unlike thrill rides or dark rides, fun houses are participatory attractions where visitors enter and move around at their own pace. Incorporating aspects of an obstacle course, they seek to distort conventional perceptions and startle people with unpredictable physical circumstances.

== Common features ==
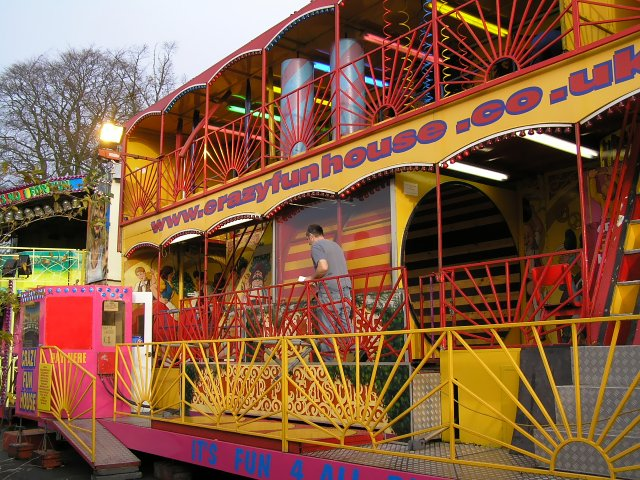
The funhouse at Malton fair. The entire building folds onto one trailer for hauling.

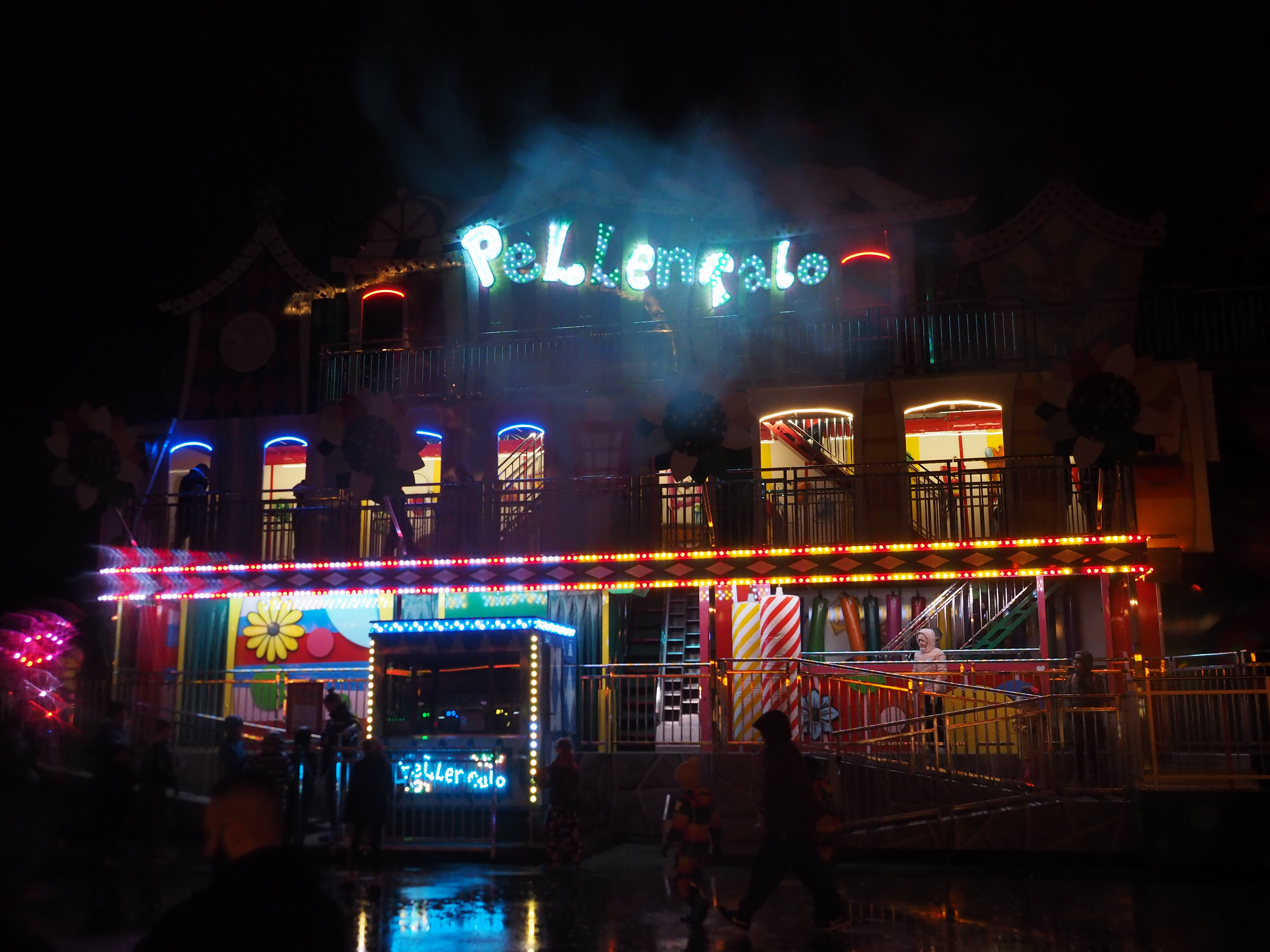
Pellen talo (literally "House of Clown"), an illuminated funhouse at the Linnanmäki amusement park in Helsinki, Finland, during the annual lights carnival of Linnanmäki

Originally starting in Coney Island in the early 1900s, the funhouse was initially a house or large building containing a number of amusement devices (e.g. motorized versions of what can be found on a children's playground).

The most common amusements were:

- Slides - Some up to two stories high. Most were made of polished hardwood, and riders sat on burlap mats to protect themselves from friction burns and to prevent rubber-soled shoes from slowing the slider down.
- Spinning disks - While the disk was stationary, patrons would sit in its center. As the operator started to spin the disk, people were thrown off by inertia and would end up against a padded wall. A variation was a disk with a raised center, shaped much like a Bundt cake mold; as the device sped up, people slid downhill and outward.
- A horizontal revolving cylinder or barrel, sometimes called a "barrel of love" or "barrel of fun", that patrons would try to walk through without falling down.
- Floor tricks where sections of floor swung up and down, tipped from side to side or moved forward and back, either motorized or activated by the person's weight. There were also stairs that moved up and down, tipped from side to side, or slid side-to-side, alternating directions between steps.
- Compressed air jets shooting air up from the floor, originally designed to blow up women's skirts but meant to startle anyone.
- An array of distorting mirrors.
- An extra-large ball pit.

One type of trick plays on the image of a trap door: it consists of a section of floor that suddenly drops a few inches, making visitors think they are falling into a trap door.

Some fun houses brought new arrivals through a short series of dark corridors or a mirror maze or door maze (many identical doors forming squares, only one of which opened in each square), often leading onto a small stage where they had to negotiate a series of rocking floors, air jets and other obstacles, while people already inside the funhouse could watch and laugh at them. A few even provided benches for the watchers. Once patrons were inside, they could stay as long as they wished, repeating each feature as many times as they chose.

This type of fun house resembled a miniature version of Steeplechase Park at Coney Island, whose 'Pavilion of Fun'—a building resembling a huge airplane hangar—included, in addition to rides, a gigantic slide, a spinning disk probably 50 feet (15 m) across, and a lighted stage called the "Insanitarium" where patrons emerging from the Steeplechase ride were harassed by a clown carrying an electric wand, while women in skirts were at the mercy of air-jet bursts. Through the first half of the 20th century, most amusement parks had this type of fun house, but its free-form design was its undoing. It was labor-intensive, needing an attendant at almost every device, and when people spent two hours in the fun house, they were not out on the midway buying tickets to other rides and attractions. Traditional fun houses gave way to walk-throughs, where patrons followed a set path all the way through and emerged back on the midway a few minutes later. These preserved some of the traditional fun house features, including various kinds of moving floors, sometimes a revolving barrel, and a small slide. They added such things as crooked rooms, where a combination of tilt and optical illusion made it hard to know which way was up, and dark corridors with various pop-up and jump-out surprises, optical illusions and sound effects.

Although some walkthroughs were given unique names, like Aladdin's Castle (Riverview Park in Chicago, Illinois), Magic Carpet (Crystal Beach Park, Crystal Beach, Ontario, Canada) or Riverboat (Palisades Park, New Jersey), many were still labelled Fun House, and regardless of the official name, the public generally referred to them that way.

Many traditional fun houses were removed after parks created walkthroughs. Some became dilapidated and were torn down. A few burned down; they were nearly all wood-frame buildings with extensive electrical wiring. Those that remained were all at traditional local amusement parks and died when those parks closed due to competition from new theme parks. No theme park ever created a traditional freeform stay-all-day fun house, but some modern theme parks developed the walk-through attraction to new, high-tech heights. A few traditional fun houses are still operating in Europe and Australia.

Related, but with a somewhat different history, are walk-through haunted houses and mirror mazes, although the latter are sometimes labelled fun houses.

== Carnival fun houses ==
Traveling carnivals have long included small walk-through fun houses in addition to their thrill rides. The typical carnival fun house is built entirely in a semi-trailer, usually about 40 feet (12 m) long by 8 feet (2.4 m) wide, allowing limited space for elaborate scenes or effects. Common features are dark corridors, light-up skulls, gravity-powered tipping floors, and air jets at the exit. Other examples include motorized devices like moving floors and stairways, or downscaled revolving barrels. A few attractions traveling on two or more trailers are more elaborate.

Beginning in the late 1980s, a few American operators acquired European-built attractions that unfold into multi-storied walkthroughs with dozens of tricks. Such fun houses are ubiquitous in Europe, but the falling value of the U.S. dollar and the high cost of fuel to transport multiple trailers over the long distances carnivals travel in the United States has made them expensive to buy and operate. Due to these factors, fun homes have become few and far between at local fairs and are usually only seen at large state fairs.

== See also ==
- Mystery Fun House
- Obstacle course
