= The Wonderful Ice Cream Suit =

Ray Bradbury's The Wonderful Ice Cream Suit
- Promotional release poster
- Directed by: Stuart Gordon
- Written by: Ray Bradbury (play and screenplay)
- Produced by: Roy E. Disney; Stuart Gordon; Laura J. Medina
- Starring: Clifton Collins Jr.; Joe Mantegna; Esai Morales; Gregory Sierra; Edward James Olmos
- Cinematography: Mac Ahlberg
- Edited by: Andy Horvitch
- Music by: Mader
- Production company: Touchstone Home Video
- Distributed by: Buena Vista Home Entertainment
- Release date: January 23, 1998
- Running time: 77 minutes
- Language: English

Ray Bradbury's The Wonderful Ice Cream Suit, also known as The Wonderful Ice Cream Suit, is a 1998 American fantasy comedy film directed by Stuart Gordon, written by Ray Bradbury and starring Edward James Olmos, Joe Mantegna, Esai Morales, Clifton Collins Jr. (credited as Clifton Gonzalez Gonzalez), Sid Caesar, Howard Morris and Gregory Sierra. It is set in East Los Angeles.

Despite some well-known actors and the writing credit of Bradbury, having been intended for a theatrical release, the film was produced by Touchstone Home Video and released direct-to-video by Buena Vista Home Entertainment on January 23, 1998. Years later in an interview, Roy E. Disney of the Disney Studios, explained that while he was enamored with the stage play on which the film is based, the studio balked at paying feature film big budget prices to bring the material to the big screen. Eager to get "the thing made", Roy E. Disney went along with having the play made as a made-for-TV-movie, with a much lower budget. The trouble with that, he found out, was that under contractual duties he could not bring the made-for-TV movie to the big screen without going back and re-paying all those who worked on the original television movie a second time. So the television movie was released direct to video and not theatrically.

== Plot ==
Jose Martinez is a poor young man living in East Los Angeles who is in love with the girl next door. He encounters a strange man eyeing him and runs off, throwing away his wallet along with his last $20 to escape. When cornered in the alley, he is given back his money where the man takes his measurements. This man introduces himself as Gómez and whisks Martinez off to a run-down bar. There he meets two other similarly sized Latinos: Dominguez, a wandering guitar player, and Villanazul, a burgeoning philosopher and speaker for the people.

Gómez shows them that they all have the same measurements, height, and weight. It is at that moment that Gómez shares his vision. A vanilla-ice-cream-white summer suit is for sale at the downtown suit emporium. It is one of a kind and costs only $100. Alone, none of them have enough to purchase the suit, but by combining their money, they may be able to own the one-of-a-kind suit together. Each of the four has only $20, leaving them with $80 – just $20 short. They need one more person to complete their dream. In their haste, they choose to go along with an unwashed bum, Vámonos, who has the last $20 they need.

Once they buy the suit, they work out a system to decide who will wear it. Each partner will get to wear it for the entire night, one night a week. However, on the first night, they will each wear it for one hour, then return to the bar. Dominguez goes first, and stirs up a parade with his guitar playing, inspiring those who hear it to ¡Muévete! Villanazul is second, and during his hour he interrupts a politician on a soapbox to perform a poem he has written. Martinez, third in line, returns to the balcony where he first saw the girl next door. While she had previously not noticed him (because she did not have her glasses on), this time the bright white suit attracts her attention and Martinez gets her name: Celia Obregon.

Gómez is next. Acting on an earlier hunch that Gómez's plan was a scam to get the money from the others to buy the suit and leave town, Villanazul reminds Gómez to "go with God." This was indeed the plan all along, but on the way to the bus station, Gómez encounters a mural of five men, each resembling a member of their group. Gómez decides not to leave, and returns.

Finally, it is Vámonos's turn. Gómez is infuriated that the filthy Vámonos did not clean himself before his turn. Along with the others, they force Vámonos to take a bath, something he hadn't done in years. Once clean, he is given a series of rules by Gómez, aimed at keeping the suit clean: no eating juicy tacos, drinking wine, smoking cigars, or even standing under trees with birds. Furthermore, he insists that Vámonos avoid meeting with a woman named Ruby Escadrío, whose boyfriend, Toro, would ruin the suit in a fight. Vámonos heads off to a club. He is followed by the other four members, who watch him ignore every one of Gómez's rules.

Ruby Escadrío shows up, and she and Vámonos dance. Toro, predictably, is angry. The others protect Vámonos from Toro, Gómez even going so far as to insist Toro hit him instead of Vámonos. The fight ends after Toro hits Vámonos with his car. His leg is broken, but Vámonos insists that they quickly take off the suit before the ambulance arrives, because the paramedics would cut the suit off and ruin it. They do, and Vámonos is rushed to the hospital.

In the final scene, Dominguez has ironed the suit and placed it on a mannequin. As the scene continues, it becomes apparent that the suit is one of the few things the group has left: they are sleeping on a rooftop, with only a few hammocks between them. Vámonos is fine, though his leg is still in a cast. Martinez contemplates that if they were rich, they would never have had the great time they have spent together, before Villanazul tells him to get some sleep.

== Cast ==
- Joe Mantegna as Gomez
- Esai Morales as Dominguez
- Edward James Olmos as Vámonos
- Clifton Gonzalez Gonzalez as Martinez
- Gregory Sierra as Villanazul
- Liz Torres as Ruby Escadrillo
- Mercedes Ortega as Celia Obregon
- Sid Caesar as Sid Zellman
- Howard Morris as Leo Zellman
- Lisa Vidal as Ramona
- Mike Moroff as Toro
- Tony Plana as Victor Medina (soapbox politician)

== Production ==
The story's life and inspiration comes from Ray Bradbury's 1958 Saturday Evening Post short story "The Magic White Suit". The story was later renamed "The Wonderful Ice Cream Suit" and was adapted into a short play published in The Wonderful Ice Cream Suit and Other Plays (ISBN 0-552-67297-1), a 1972 collection of three plays by Ray Bradbury: The Wonderful Ice Cream Suit, The Veldt, and To the Chicago Abyss. All are adaptations from short stories of the same names. Bradbury stated the idea for the story came from his adolescence growing up in the 1930s as until 18 or 19 years old he would wear clothes from his father or older brothers due to his family being on government relief and actually wore the suit his uncle was killed in, complete with bullet holes, to his graduation from Los Angeles High School. Once Bradbury earned his own money, the first thing he did was buy some clothes for himself. During his time living in a Los Angeles tenement in the 1940s, Bradbury noticed friends who go back-and-forth across the border to Mexico would borrow clothes from each other as well as pool their resources to buy clothes together.

The story has gone on to see numerous incarnations as a television drama, a stage musical, and play (the latter two Bradbury himself had written). The first screen adaptation of The Wonderful Ice Cream Suit was a television version broadcast. A Los Angeles production of the play featured the debut of actor F. Murray Abraham.

Stuart Gordon's Organic Theater Company had put on a production of The Wonderful Ice Cream Suit in 1973 after Gordon had come across Bradbury's story which prompted Gordon to acquire the rights and mount a production with players that included Joe Mantegna, Dennis Franz, and Meshach Taylor. The production was a big success for the company that toured the world which Gordon attributed to the universal nature of the story where even if the audience couldn't understand the language, they understood the play.

A Los Angeles production of the play found a massive supporter in Roy E. Disney, then Vice Chairman of The Walt Disney Company and head of Walt Disney Animation Studios, who saw the play multiple times. On Disney's suggestion, the company acquired the film rights and Bradbury himself was hired to write the screenplay. Gordon was hired to direct the film as Bradbury was very receptive to Gordon's 1973 stage version he directed. Joe Mantegna, another veteran of the 1973 stage production, reprised his role as Gomez relishing the opportunity to play the role on film after gaining 24 years worth of acting experience. Gordon and Bradbury collaborated very closely on the project with Gordon encouraging input from Bradbury at every opportunity with Bradbury speaking enthusiastically of the experience saying it was the first time his work had been produced as written rather than going through a gauntlet of rewrites. Gordon was very enthusiastic at the prospect of working on something magical and comedic in contrast to his better known work as a genre filmmaker in horror and science fiction films.

Filming on the film took place from August through September of 1997.

== Release ==
The 1998 version of the film was originally shown at that year's Sundance Film Festival. Ray Bradbury wrote the screenplay. He has called that film version "the best film I've ever made". Throughout 1998, The Wonderful Ice Cream Suit was shown at the following film festivals:

- Sundance Film Festival
- Santa Barbara International Film Festival
- Cleveland International Film Festival
- Chicago Latino Film Festival
- Los Angeles Latino International Film Festival

Following its run on the festival circuit, The Wonderful Ice Cream Suit was released straight-to-video in the United States on March 16, 1999.

== Awards ==
Nomination:

- Annie Awards – 1998; Nominated for "Outstanding Achievement in an Animated Interstitial, Promotional Production or Title Sequence"
- Fantasporto – 1998; Nominated for "International Fantasy Film Award for Best Film"

Winner:

- Fantafestival – 1998; Won for "Best Direction" Stuart Gordon
