= Lake Butler, Orange County, Florida =

Unincorporated area in Florida, US

Lake Butler, Florida
- Census-designated place
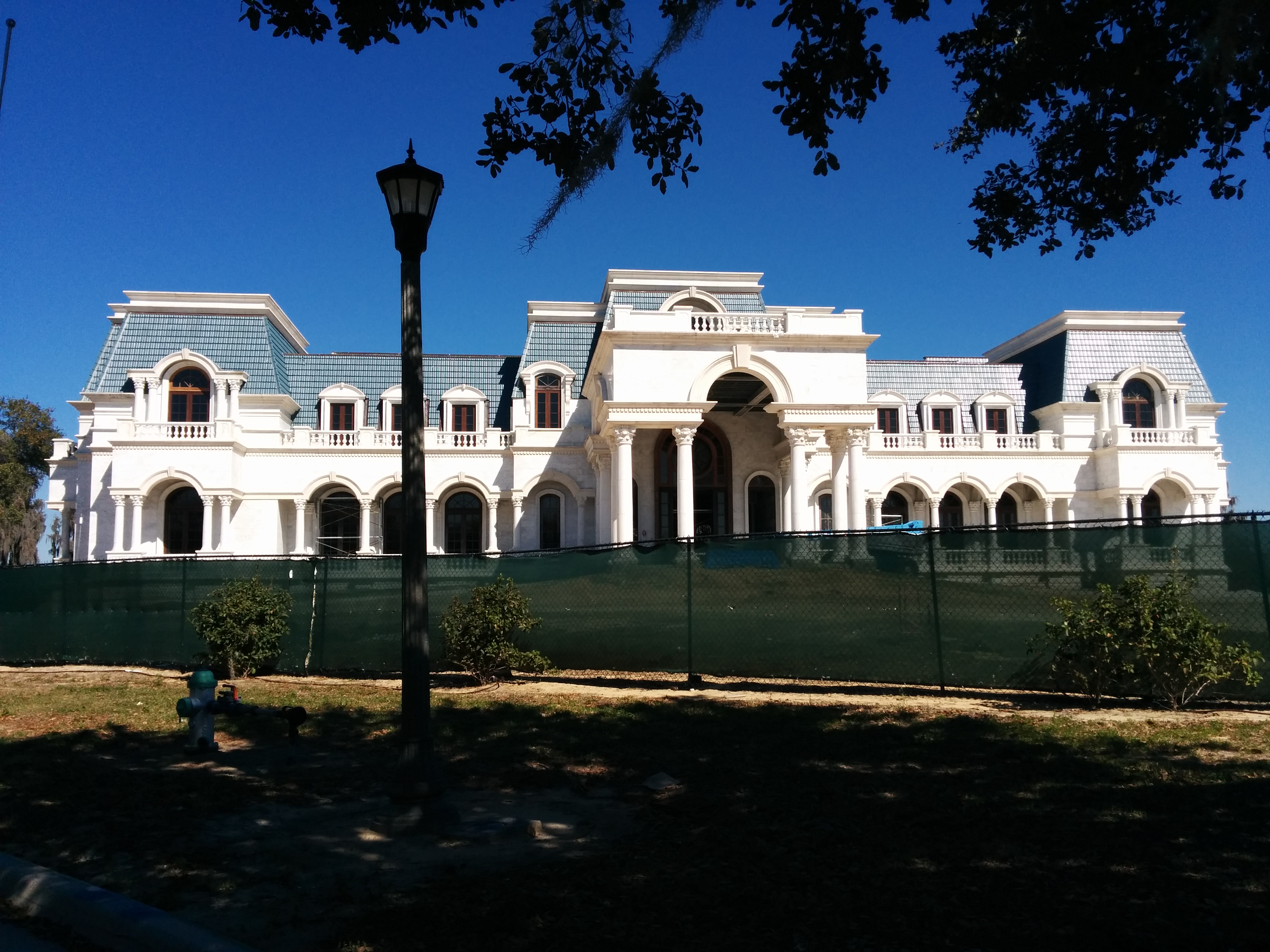
- Versailles, of the largest private homes in the United States, under construction in Lake Butler

- Location in Orange County and the state of Florida
- Coordinates: 28°30′35″N 81°33′26″W
- Country: United States
- State: Florida
- Counties: Orange

Area
  - Total: 20.0 sq mi (51.7 km^{2})
  - Land: 12.2 sq mi (31.6 km^{2})
  - Water: 7.7 sq mi (20.0 km^{2})
- Elevation: 98 ft (30 m)

Population (2020)
  - Total: 18,851
  - Density: 1,550/sq mi (597/km^{2})
- Time zone: UTC-5 (Eastern (EST))
  - Summer (DST): UTC-4 (EDT)
- GNIS ID: 2403188

Lake Butler is a census-designated place (CDP) and unincorporated area, completely surrounding the town of Windermere, in Orange County, Florida, United States. The population was 18,851 at the 2020 census, up from 15,400 at the 2010 census. It is part of the Orlando–Kissimmee–Sanford, Florida Metropolitan Statistical Area.

The Lake Butler CDP contains the communities of Isleworth and Summerport Beach.

== Geography ==
Lake Butler is located approximately 11 miles (18 km) west-southwest of downtown Orlando.

According to the United States Census Bureau, the CDP has a total area of 20.0 square miles (51.7 km^{2}), of which 12.2 square miles (31.6 km^{2}) is land and 7.7 square miles (20.0 km^{2}) (38.75%) is water. There are several lakes in the vicinity, the largest of which is Lake Butler. Others nearby include Lake William Davis, Lake Cypress, Lake Louise, and Lake Bessie.

== Demographics ==
As of the census of 2000, there were 7,062 people, 2,255 households, and 2,009 families residing in the CDP. The population density was 210.6 people/km^{2} (545 people/mi^{2}). There were 2,451 housing units at an average density of 73.1 units/km^{2} (189 units/mi^{2}). The racial makeup of the CDP was 89.75% White, 3.41% African American, 0.14% Native American, 3.91% Asian, 0.03% Pacific Islander, 0.74% from other races, and 2.02% from two or more races. Hispanic or Latino of any race were 4.67% of the population.

There were 2,255 households, out of which 49.5% had children under the age of 18 living with them, 82.0% were married couples living together, 4.8% had a female householder with no husband present, and 10.9% were non-families. 8.0% of all households were made up of individuals, and 2.1% had someone living alone who was 65 years of age or older. The average household size was 3.13 and the average family size was 3.32.

In the CDP, the population was spread out, with 32.5% under the age of 18, 4.3% from 18 to 24, 29.3% from 25 to 44, 27.2% from 45 to 64, and 6.7% who were 65 years of age or older. The median age was 38 years. For every 100 females, there were 98.8 males. For every 100 females age 18 and over, there were 97.5 males.

The median income for a household in the CDP was $113,819, and the median income for a family was $113,863. Males had a median income of $89,507 versus $43,864 for females. The per capita income for the CDP was $49,696. About 1.2% of families and 1.8% of the population were below the poverty line, including 1.7% of those under age 18 and 3.0% of those age 65 or over.

== Education ==
Lake Butler is within Orange County Public Schools.

Portions of Lake Butler are served by Bridgewater Middle School, Sunridge Middle School, Gotha Middle School, and Chain of Lakes Middle School.

When Windermere High School in Lake Butler opens in 2017, much of Lake Butler will be in its attendance boundary. The Windermere High portion was previously assigned to West Orange High School, which continues to serve other parts of Lake Butler. Other parts of Lake Butler are served by Olympia High School, and small portion is zoned to Dr. Phillips High School.

The private school Windermere Preparatory School is located in Lake Butler.

== See also ==
- Versailles (house)
