= David A. Siegel =

American businessman (1935–2025)

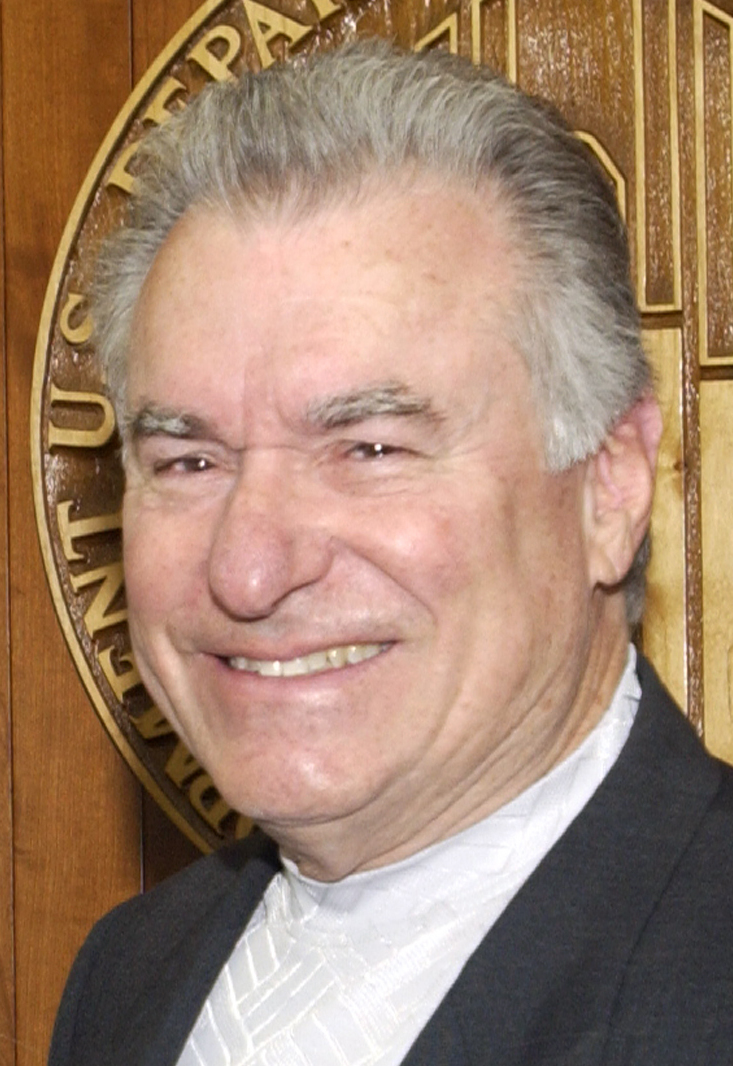
- Siegel in 2003
- Born: May 3, 1935; Chicago, Illinois, U.S.
- Died: April 5, 2025 (aged 89)
- Education: University of Miami (dropped out)
- Occupation: Businessman
- Organization: Westgate Resorts
- Political party: Republican
- Spouses: Geraldine Florence Sanstrom (m. 1961; div. 1968) Bettie Irene Tucker (m. 1970; div. 1997) Jackie Mallery (m. 2000)
- Children: 12

David Alan Siegel (May 3, 1935 – April 5, 2025) was an American businessman who founded Westgate Resorts, a Florida-based timeshare resort firm, and was its president and chief executive officer. Siegel was CEO of CFI Resorts Management Inc and Central Florida Investments Inc. His other businesses included real estate, construction, hotel and apartment management, travel services, insurance, transportation, and retail.

Siegel, his wife Jackie, and their Versailles house were the subject of the 2012 documentary film The Queen of Versailles, which chronicled the family's lifestyle and business challenges during the 2008 financial crisis. The story was later adapted into a stage musical, The Queen of Versailles, which premiered in 2024 with F. Murray Abraham portraying Siegel.

Siegel owned the Orlando Predators, an arena football team. He bought the Cocoa Beach Pier and the Las Vegas Hotel.

== Early life and education ==
Siegel was born to a wealthy Jewish family in Chicago on May 3, 1935, to Sadelle and Sid Siegel, a grocer, who moved the family and grocery business to Miami in 1945. Siegel grew up in Florida where he graduated from Miami Senior High School in 1953, and later studied marketing and management at the University of Miami, before dropping out.

== Career ==
Siegel was one of the founders of Mystery Fun House in Orlando, Florida, which opened on March 28, 1976, and operated until 2001. Over time, the fun house expanded to include a laser-tag facility, an arcade, and a dinosaur-themed mini golf course. He also produced the movie Night Terror in 2002. It starred local talent but also included Jeff Speakman and Al Lewis (The Munsters).

Siegel founded Westgate Resorts in 1982 with the opening of a 16-unit resort at Westgate Vacation Villas in Kissimmee, Florida. Under his leadership, the company grew into the largest privately held timeshare company in the world, with properties across the United States.

Siegel and his family were featured in the 2012 documentary The Queen of Versailles, directed by Lauren Greenfield. The film follows their attempt to build a large mansion in Florida during the 2008 financial crisis and documents the financial challenges faced by Westgate Resorts, including the loss of the PH Towers Westgate in Las Vegas. Siegel's businesses, family, and personal life were adversely affected by the 2008 financial crisis, as seen in the documentary.

In early 2025, Westgate Resorts announced the acquisition of VI Resorts through its affiliate Vacation Ownership Sales (VOS), adding over 40 new locations to the company's portfolio. The move marked one of the most significant geographic expansions in Westgate's history.

=== Political activities ===
Siegel supported George W. Bush during the 2000 presidential election. In a 2012 interview with Bloomberg Businessweek, he described efforts to influence employee voting preferences, including distributing negative articles about Al Gore with paychecks, conducting internal surveys, and organizing voter outreach calls in favor of Bush. He later claimed that approximately 1,000 employees voted who otherwise would not have.

During the 2012 United States elections, Siegel attracted public attention after sending an email to his employees suggesting that a victory for Barack Obama could lead to layoffs or changes in company operations. The email was widely circulated and sparked media criticism. Despite the warning, Siegel later stated that 2012 and subsequent years were financially successful for the company. In 2015, he announced a wage increase to a $10 per hour minimum for Westgate employees.

=== Philanthropy ===
Following the death of his daughter Victoria in 2015 due to a drug overdose, Siegel and his wife established the Victoria’s Voice Foundation, aimed at raising awareness around opioid abuse and supporting prevention efforts nationwide. The foundation advocates for youth drug education, increased access to naloxone, and legislative reform.

One of the foundation’s key initiatives, "Victoria’s Law," was passed in Florida to designate June 6 as "Revive Awareness Day" and promote overdose education and prevention measures statewide.

=== Controversies ===
In 2008, Siegel was named in a sexual harassment lawsuit filed by a Westgate former employee. In 2012, a jury awarded the plaintiff damages. Siegel denied the allegations. The case was covered by various media outlets at the time of the documentary's release.

In 2012, Siegel and Westgate Resorts filed a defamation lawsuit against the Sundance Institute and the filmmakers, which was stayed and later resolved through arbitration. In 2014, the arbitrator ruled in favor of the filmmakers, finding no falsehoods in the film and awarding them $750,000. A separate lawsuit by David and Jackie Siegel regarding life rights was also dismissed.

== Personal life and death ==
In March 1961, Siegel married Geraldine Florence Sanstrom. Their marriage ended in 1968. In 1970, Siegel married Betty Tucker and moved from Miami to Orlando. They divorced in 1997, and he remained the custodial parent of all the children. He met his third and final wife Jackie Siegel in 1998. Although she is not Jewish, they were married in a Jewish ceremony. Together, they had eight children, including Jackie's adopted niece, Jonquil. Their other children are: Victoria, David, Daniel, Debbie, Drew, and twins, Jacqueline and Jordan.

On June 6, 2015, the Siegels' 18-year-old daughter Victoria died after an accidental drug overdose, which motivated him to advocate against drug abuse.

On April 5, 2025, Siegel died following a bout with cancer. He was 89.

== Filmography ==
Year	Title	Self	Producer	Actor	Notes
2000	Held for Ransom	No	No	Yes	Crime scene detective
2002	Night Terror	No	Yes	Yes	Policeman
2011	My Trip to the Dark Side	No	No	No	Special thanks
2012	The Queen of Versailles	Yes	No	No	
2015	Celebrity Wife Swap	Yes	No	No	
2015	Bob Massi Is the Property Man	Yes	No	No	2 episodes
2016	Beneath the Crown	Yes	No	No	Interviewee
2017	Flipping Out	Yes	No	No	Potential client
2021	Below Deck	Yes	No	No	2 episodes
