= Secret Lives of the Super Rich =

American television series

- Genre: Documentary; Reality
- Starring: Robert Frank
- Country of origin: United States
- Original language: English
- No. of seasons: 7

Production
- Executive producer: Ray Parisi
- Producers: Jake Callahan; Jamie Corsi; Christopher DiLella; Jessi Joseph; Kevin Kane; Kelly Lin; Melissa Lustrin; Erica Posse; Erica Wright; Will Ford; Peter Johansen
- Camera setup: Multiple
- Running time: 30 minutes

Original release
- Network: CNBC
- Release: September 25, 2013 – July 12, 2019

Secret Lives of the Super Rich is an American television series hosted by Robert Frank airing on CNBC. The series explores how wealthy people live, what they buy and how they travel. It regularly features mansions, luxury cars and aircraft and expensive jewelry.

It premiered on September 25, 2013, running for eight half-hour episodes. A second six-episode series premiered on January 22, 2014. A third season of just four episodes premiered on June 10, 2014. A fourth season of six episodes premiered on March 24, 2015. A fifth season premiered on March 30, 2016. A sixth season premiered on January 19, 2017.

Los Angeles–based real estate agent Aaron Kirman is featured regularly in the program.

== Episodes ==
Season	Episodes	Originally released	
Season	Episodes	First released	Last released
1	8	September 25, 2013	October 16, 2013
2	6	January 22, 2014	February 5, 2014
3	4	June 10, 2014	July 5, 2014
4	6	March 24, 2015	April 14, 2015
5	17	March 30, 2016	August 7, 2016
6	20	January 19, 2017	December 7, 2017
7	10	March 7, 2018	July 12, 2019

=== Season 1 (2013) ===
No. overall	No. in season	Title	Original release date	U.S. viewers
1	1	"Super Rich Mega-Mansion & a Luxury Survival Silo"	September 25, 2013	N/A
Go inside the largest home in America. Visit a secret $150,000,000 mega-mansion. And, tour a bombproof underground luxury condo where the super rich plan to survive the apocalypse in style.
2	2	"Super Rich Town & a Mega-Wedding"	September 25, 2013	N/A
Travel to the richest town in America and tour the most expensive home - and the least expensive. Plus, watch celebrity party planner, Colin Cowie, as he races to complete a mega-wedding for a super rich groom and his Playboy playmate wife.
3	3	"Super Rich Secret Party & Mega-Taxidermy"	October 2, 2013	N/A
Watch an event planner for billionaires create an upside-down birch forest for a top-secret celebration. And, go inside one of NYC's most exclusive addresses to uncover the most unusual apartment you've ever seen - it's covered wall-to-wall in dead animals.
4	4	"Super Rich Private Jets & the Gold Lambo"	October 2, 2013	N/A
A detailed look at how a gulfstream jet gets a multi-million dollar makeover from one of the most sought-after designers in America. Plus, meet the 20-something owner of the #1 Lamborghini dealer in the country. And, go inside an unusual NYC mega-mansion listed for $28 million.
5	5	"Super Rich Car Collectors & a Super-Secret Club"	October 9, 2013	N/A
Travel to a small island where the super rich spend more than $50,000,000 on classic cars in one weekend, and meet the "Ferrari Whisperer," who knows the histories - and tragedies - behind the world's most valuable vintage Ferraris. Plus, go inside a super-secret NYC watch club and see a watch worth more than most houses.
6	6	"Super Rich Mega-Yacht & Miami Mansions"	October 9, 2013	N/A
Meet the two women in Miami who have the keys to the city's priciest real estate. Plus, travel to a small town in the Netherlands where the largest yachts in the world are being built. Meet the Aussie billionaire spending hundreds of millions to build a replica of the Titanic. And, go inside a private house party with food catered by one of the finest restaurants in the country - while the London Philharmonic plays in the living room.
7	7	"Super Rich Town & Super Rich Beach House & Mega-Ferraris"	October 16, 2013	N/A
Go inside LA's hottest properties, plus a $54,000,000 Malibu beach house. And, meet the humble Midwesterner who can turn rusty old sports cars into tens of millions of dollars. By the way, billionaires have to wait years for his services.
8	8	"Super Rich Speed Club & Mega-Mansions"	October 16, 2013	N/A
See where the super rich go to blow the speed limit. Plus, a mega-mansion painted with 18k gold, and a peek inside a very private, super rich way to go shopping.

=== Season 2 (2014) ===
No. overall	No. in season	Title	Original release date	U.S. viewers
9	1	"$27 Million Horse Race & Mansion Collectors"	January 22, 2014	N/A
The Season 2 premiere spotlights one of the richest sporting events in America; an L.A. mansion; and Aspen's most exclusive club.
10	2	"Penthouse Secrets & the Mega-Yacht Super Ship"	January 22, 2014	N/A
Touring a VIP penthouse suite; boarding a super ship that carries mega-yachts; and visiting a for-sale Gold Coast mansion that's filled with a shocking collection.
11	3	"Bulldoze My Mansion; The Super Luxe Commute"	February 5, 2014	N/A
A Hollywood Hills mega-mansion that potential buyers want to bulldoze; the most expensive way to commute; the most expensive watch money cannot buy; and a mega-home with a single room that's worth $2.5 million.
12	4	"Secrets From Madoff's Penthouse; X-Rated Pocket Porn"	February 5, 2014	N/A
A penthouse once owned by Bernie Madoff; X-rated pocket watches that are worth a small fortune; and multi-million dollar home movie theatres.
13	5	"Hunting for Million Dollar Horses; Mega-Homes"	February 5, 2014	N/A
A bidding war over million-dollar horses; a look at mega-homes and their owners.
14	6	"Treasure Hunting; Inside a Ferrari Vault"	February 5, 2014	N/A
A super-rich diver's search for a treasure that's worth millions; a state-of-the-art robotic vault packed with Ferraris, expensive art and rare dinosaurs bones.

=== Season 3 (2014) ===
No. overall	No. in season	Title	Original release date	U.S. viewers
15	1	"Lamborghini Boat; A Vacation Worth Millions"	June 10, 2014	N/A
A man takes his Lamborghini enthusiasm to the water in the Season 3 premiere. Also: a rare luxury wildlife safari; a look inside a Star Trek mega-mansion.
16	2	"Billionaire Beach; A Mystery Super Jet"	June 10, 2014	N/A
An exclusive private beach is visited. Also: a look inside Rihanna's Los Angeles mansion; a mega-mansion built for a horse; a $30 million superjet.
17	3	"Thigh-Master Mansion; Horse Sex"	June 17, 2014	N/A
A desert estate called the "Thigh Master mansion" is featured; a millionaire claims there's money in horse sex. Also: one of New York City's most exclusive residences; a home built just for cars.
18	4	"The Blonde Billionaire; Underwater Jets"	July 5, 2014	N/A
Billionaire Lynn Tilton is featured; a mansion featuring a Rolls-Royce and a spot for a super-yacht is spotlighted; and an L.A. dermatologist with a Ferrari faces a major real-estate decision.

=== Season 4 (2015) ===
No. overall	No. in season	Title	Original release date	U.S. viewers
19	1	"A Billionaire's Lair & Super Rich Dog"	March 24, 2015	N/A
A tour of a high-priced mansion, including a premium parking spot for a Ferrari and a $2.6 million watch. Also: a rich dog living in a Miami penthouse.
20	2	"Bond Cars & Secret Jewel Room"	March 24, 2015	N/A
A look at the largest James Bond car collection in the world; a peek inside a $45 million mansion; and a piece of jewelry with a $120 million price tag.
21	3	"The Most Expensive Home & the Dirtiest Investment"	March 31, 2015	491,000
A tour of the most expensive home in America. Also: a dirty car worth millions, a man with 18 mega-yachts, and a $30,000 perfume.
22	4	"The Most Expensive Home & the Dirtiest Investment"	March 31, 2015	364,000
A $65-million mansion; the largest closet in America; a million-dollar home in need of repairs; and an SUV covered in bullet-proof armor.
23	5	"The Nirvana Mansion and VIP Dog Hotel"	April 7, 2015	N/A
A mega-mansion packed with Buddhas and a Travolta temple; rich dogs in luxury hotels; a tour of a secret construction site; and 24k gold caskets.
24	6	"A Royal Mega-Home & $80,000 Dogs"	April 14, 2015	443,000
Super-expensive dogs; a $49 million listing; unused exotic cars.

=== Season 6 (2017) ===
No. overall	No. in season	Title	Original release date	U.S. viewers
42	1	"America's Most Expensive Mansion & Floating VIP Suite"	January 19, 2017	395,000
43	2	"The Mansion That Patron Built & A Diamond In The Rough"	January 26, 2017	280,000
44	3	"Blockbuster Mansion & The Ultimate Power Wheels"	February 2, 2017	370,000
45	4	"New York's Finest Address & The $3 Million Hybrid Ferrari"	February 9, 2017	309,000
46	5	"Rock Star's Miami Mansion & Billionaire's Custom Train"	February 16, 2017	227,000
47	6	"Silicon Valley Smart House & The Most Expensive Hotel Suite in the World"	February 23, 2017	341,000
48	7	"Vegas' Most Expensive Mansion & The $100,000 Facial"	March 2, 2017	322,000
49	8	"America's Most Expensive Zip Code & The $1,000,000 Junker"	March 2, 2017	336,000
50	9	TBA	March 9, 2017	325,000
51	10	TBA	March 9, 2017	268,000
