= F. Murray Abraham =

American actor (born 1939)

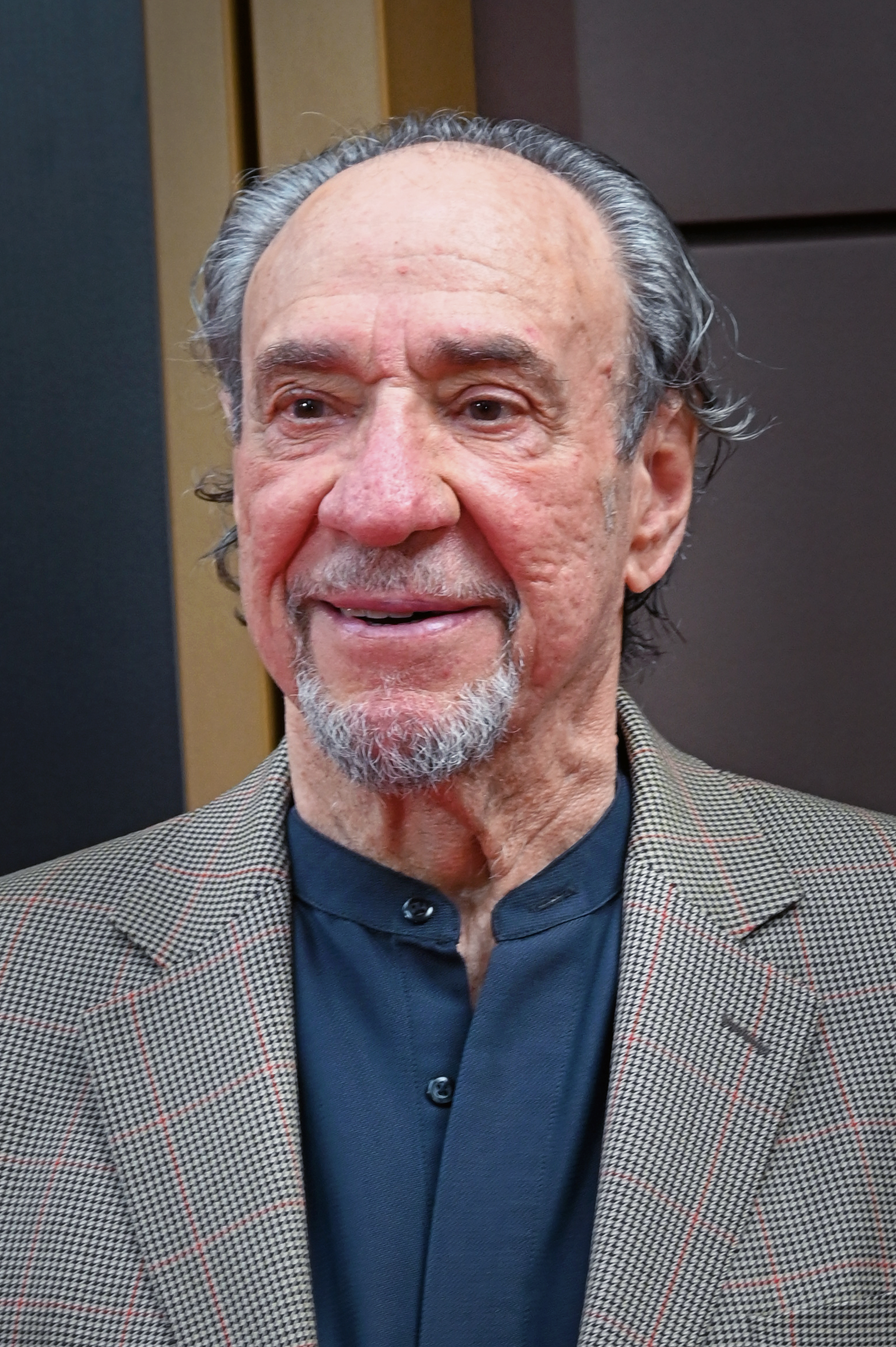
- Abraham in 2026
- Born: Murray Abraham; October 24, 1939 (age 87); Pittsburgh, Pennsylvania, U.S.
- Occupation: Actor
- Years active: 1965–present
- Spouse: Kate Hannan (m. 1962; died 2022)
- Children: 2
- Awards: Full list

F. Murray Abraham (born Murray Abraham; October 24, 1939) is an American actor. Known for his roles on stage and screen, he has received an Academy Award and a Golden Globe Award as well as nominations for a BAFTA Award, four Emmy Awards, and a Grammy Award. He came to prominence for his portrayal of Antonio Salieri in the drama film Amadeus (1984) for which he won an Academy Award for Best Actor.

Abraham made his Broadway debut in the 1968 play The Man in the Glass Booth. He received an Obie Award for Outstanding Performance for his roles in Anton Chekhov's Uncle Vanya (1984) and William Shakespeare's The Merchant of Venice (2011). He returned to Broadway in the revival of Terrence McNally's comedy It's Only a Play (2014), receiving a Drama Desk Award for Outstanding Featured Actor in a Play nomination.

He has appeared in many roles, both leading and supporting, in films such as All the President's Men (1976), Scarface (1983), Amadeus (1984), The Name of the Rose (1986), An Innocent Man (1989), Last Action Hero (1993), Mighty Aphrodite (1995), Dillinger and Capone (1995), Star Trek: Insurrection (1998), Finding Forrester (2000), Inside Llewyn Davis (2013), The Grand Budapest Hotel (2014), Isle of Dogs (2018) and How to Train Your Dragon: The Hidden World (2019).

He was a regular cast member on the Showtime drama series Homeland (2012–2018), which earned him two nominations for the Primetime Emmy Award for Outstanding Guest Actor in a Drama Series. He also acted in Louie (2011–2014), Mythic Quest (2020–2021), Moon Knight (2022) and The White Lotus (2022), with the latter earning him nominations for a Golden Globe Award and Primetime Emmy Award.

== Early life and education ==
Abraham was born Murray Abraham on October 24, 1939; in Pittsburgh, Pennsylvania, the son of Fahrid "Fred" Abraham, an automotive mechanic, and his wife Josephine (née Stello; 1915–2012), His grandfather was a priest in the Greek Orthodox Church of Antioch in Muqlus, a village in the Valley of the Christians within Ottoman Syria. He emigrated to the United States when Abraham's father was aged five years old. His mother, one of 14 children, was Italian American and the daughter of an Italian immigrant who worked in the coal mines of Western Pennsylvania. He had two younger brothers, Robert and Jack, who were killed in separate car accidents.

Abraham was raised in El Paso, Texas. Murray and his two younger brothers were altar boys in the St. George Antiochian Orthodox Church in El Paso. He attended Vilas Grammar School, and graduated from El Paso High School in 1958. He was a gang member during his teenage years. In El Paso, Abraham worked in the Farah Clothing factory owned by a Lebanese American family before launching a career in acting. He attended Texas Western College (later named University of Texas at El Paso), where he was given the best actor award by Alpha Psi Omega for his portrayal of the Indian Nocona in Comanche Eagle during the 1959–60 season. He attended the University of Texas at Austin, then studied acting under Uta Hagen at HB Studio in New York City. He secured several backstage jobs before making his professional debut.

Abraham added "F." to his stage name in honor of his father, Fahrid. He has stated that "Murray Abraham just doesn't seem to say anything. It just is another name, so I thought I'd frame it".

== Career ==
=== 1965–1978: Early roles ===
Abraham began his professional acting career on the stage, debuting in a Los Angeles production of Ray Bradbury's The Wonderful Ice Cream Suit in 1965. He made his Broadway debut in the 1968 play The Man in the Glass Booth. He made his film debut as an usher in the George C. Scott comedy They Might Be Giants (1971). He can be seen as one of the undercover police officers along with Al Pacino in Sidney Lumet's Serpico (1973) and in television roles including the bad guy in one fourth-season episode of Kojak ("The Godson"). His early film roles include small parts as a cabdriver in the theatrical version of Neil Simon's The Prisoner of Second Avenue (1975), a mechanic in the theatrical version of Simon's The Sunshine Boys (1975). He also played a police officer in the Alan J. Pakula Watergate film All the President's Men (1976), and acted in the comedy films The Ritz (1976) opposite Rita Moreno and The Big Fix (1978) alongside Richard Dreyfuss.

By the mid-1970s, he also had steady employment doing commercials and voice-overs. Most notably, he played "the leaf", one of four costumed characters, in television and print commercials for Fruit of the Loom underwear. In 1978, he gave up this work. Frustrated with the lack of substantial roles, he said: "No one was taking my acting seriously. I figured if I didn't do it, then I'd have no right to the dreams I've always had." His wife, Kate Hannan, went to work as an assistant and Abraham became a "house husband". As he described it: "[S]he was paying the bills and I swallowed my Tex-Mex macho-ism and learned a little humility. It was a harsh lesson, but an important one, good lesson."

=== 1983–1986: Breakthrough and acclaim ===
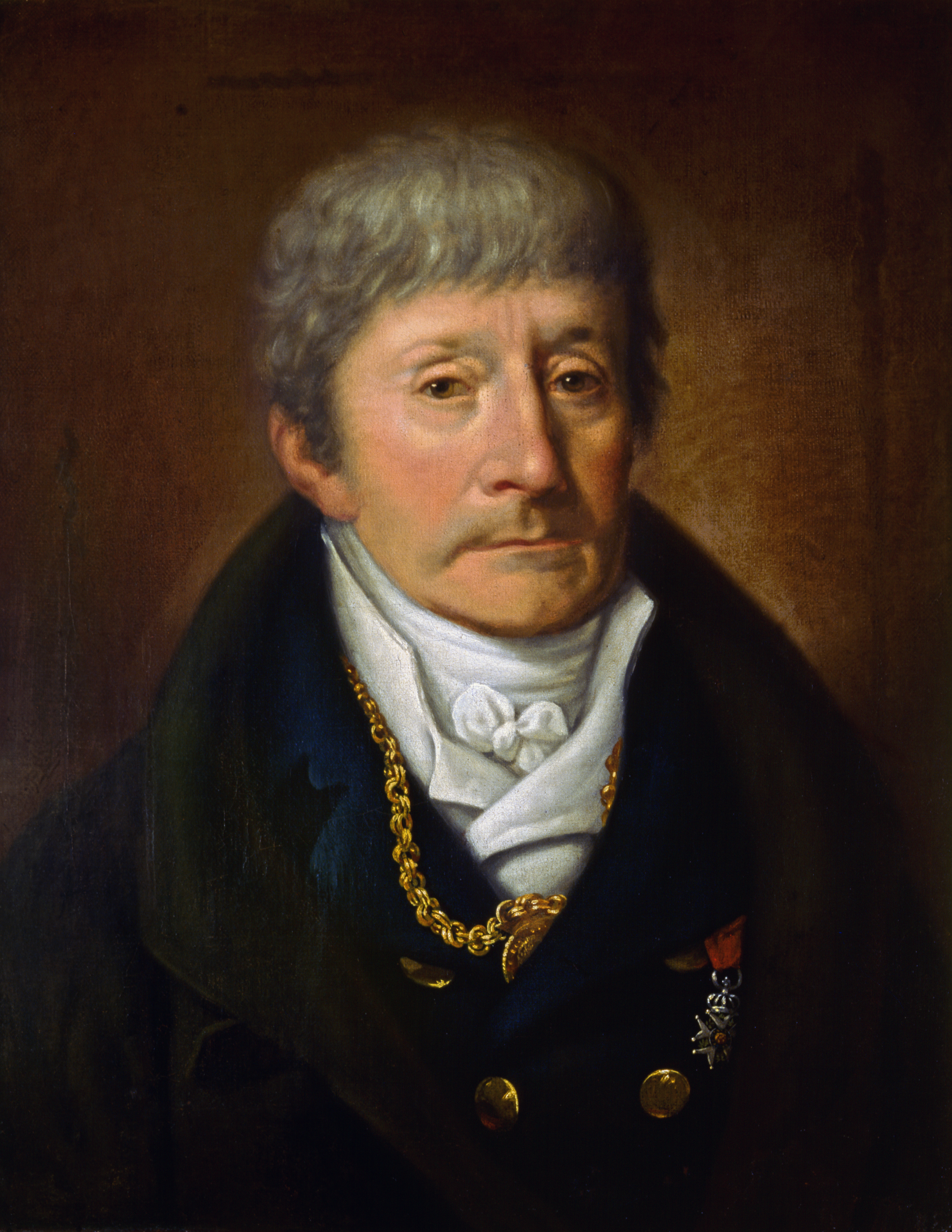
Portrait of Antonio Salieri, whom Abraham portrayed in Amadeus (1984)

Abraham gained greater prominence when he appeared as drug dealer Omar Suárez in the gangster film Scarface (1983). Then, in 1984, he played envious composer Antonio Salieri in the Academy Award for Best Picture-winning Amadeus (1984), directed by Miloš Forman. Abraham won the Academy Award for Best Actor for his role, an award for which his co-star in the film Tom Hulce, playing Wolfgang Amadeus Mozart, had also been nominated. He also won a Golden Globe Award, among other awards, and his role in the film remains his most famous.

Abraham's relatively low-profile film career subsequent to his Academy Award win has been considered an example of the "Oscar jinx". According to film critic Leonard Maltin, professional failure following an early success is referred to in Hollywood circles as the "F. Murray Abraham syndrome." Abraham rejected this notion and told Maltin, "The Oscar is the single most important event of my career. I have dined with kings, shared equal billing with my idols, lectured at Harvard and Columbia. If this is a jinx, I'll take two." In the same interview, Abraham said, "Even though I won the Oscar, I can still take the subway in New York, and nobody recognizes me. Some actors might find that disconcerting, but I find it refreshing."

Abraham also joined The Mirror Theater Ltd's Mirror Repertory Company in 1984. He joined MRC the week after winning his Oscar for Best Actor for his work in Amadeus because he wanted to work with MRC Artist-in-Residence Geraldine Page (to whom he would eventually present her own Academy Award the following year) and would star opposite her in MRC's The Madwoman of Chaillot.

Following Amadeus, he made many stage appearances, starring in Shakespearean productions such as Othello and Richard III. He appeared in other plays by the likes of Samuel Beckett and Gilbert and Sullivan and played the lead in Anton Chekhov's Uncle Vanya (for which he received an Obie Award). He also gave notable performances as Pozzo in Mike Nichols's production of Waiting for Godot and Malvolio in Twelfth Night for the New York Shakespeare Festival. His next film role was in The Name of the Rose (1986), in which he played Bernardo Gui, nemesis to Sean Connery's William of Baskerville. In its DVD commentary, the director of the film, Jean-Jacques Annaud, described Abraham as an "egomaniac" on the set, who considered himself more important than Connery because Connery did not have an Oscar. Despite the on-set tensions, the film was a critical and commercial success.

=== 1989–2000: Established actor ===
After the release of The Name of the Rose, Abraham tired of appearing as villains and said he wanted to return to his background in comedy. From May 10 through July 14, 1991, Abraham portrayed the title character in American Repertory Theater's (A.R.T.) production of King Lear, directed by Adrian Hall, in Cambridge, Massachusetts. In 1994, Abraham portrayed Roy Cohn in the first Broadway production of Tony Kushner's Angels in America at the Walter Kerr Theater, replacing Ron Leibman in the role.

Over the next decade or so, Abraham had fewer prominent roles, but he did have substantial supporting roles in Peter Yates' An Innocent Man (1989), Woody Allen's Mighty Aphrodite (1995), and Gus Van Sant's Finding Forrester (2000), where he again played the nemesis to Connery. He played Ahdar Ru'afo, the villain in Star Trek: Insurrection (1998). He had a significant role in Brian De Palma's adaptation of The Bonfire of the Vanities (1990), but chose not to be credited due to a contract dispute. He continued his association with classical music by narrating the plot summaries of the operas of Richard Wagner's Ring Cycle in the 1990 PBS broadcast from the Metropolitan Opera, to the largest viewing audience of the Ring Cycle in history, conducted by James Levine.

In the 1997/98 Broadway season, he starred in the new chamber musical Triumph of Love opposite Betty Buckley, based on Marivaux's classic comedy. The production did not find a large audience, running 85 performances after its pre-opening preview period. He has also taught theater at Brooklyn College.

=== 2001–present: Career resurgence ===
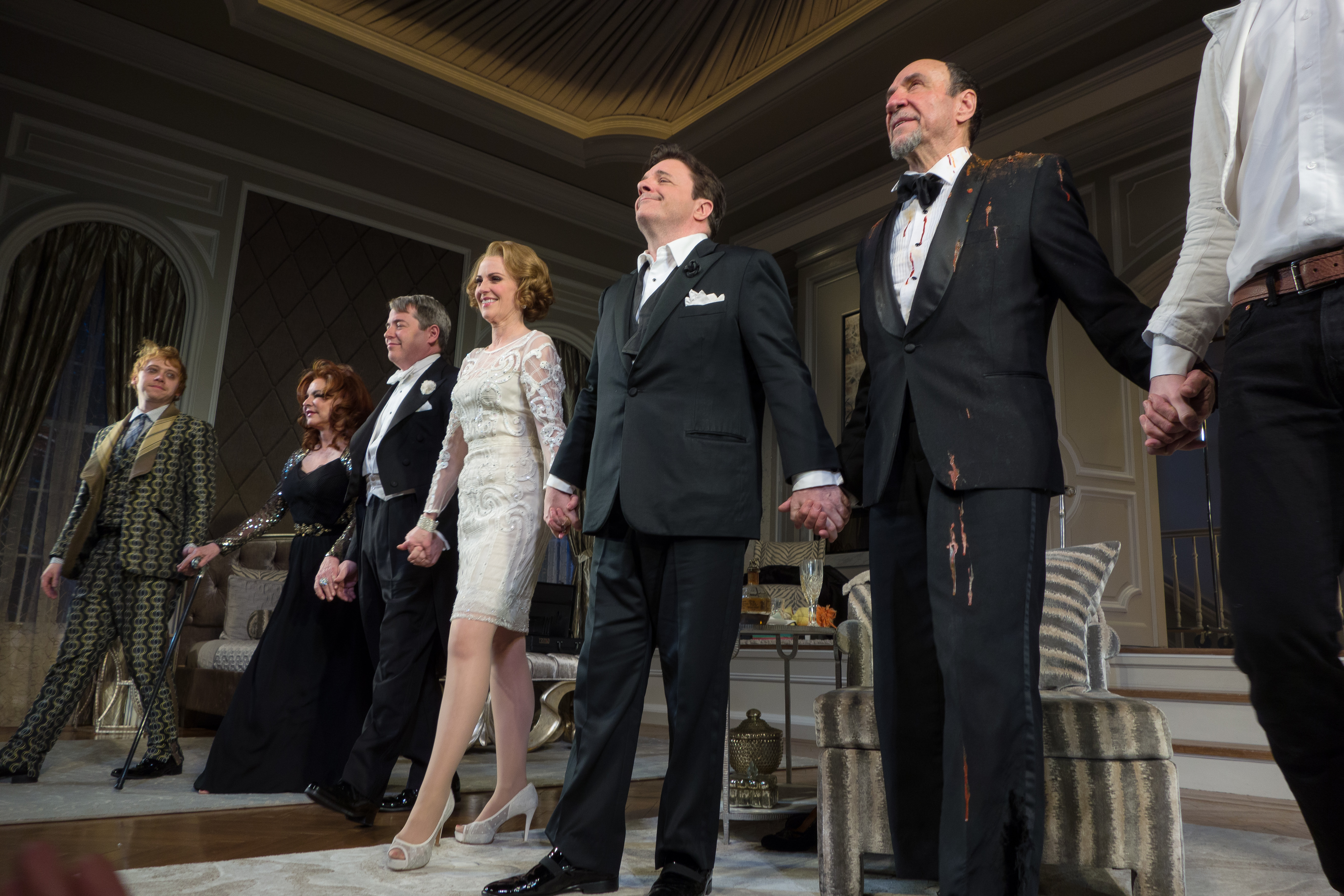
Abraham (last full figure on right) on stage at the end of a December 2014 production of It's Only a Play

In 2001, Abraham played Cyrus Kriticos in the supernatural horror film Thirteen Ghosts. In 2008 he starred in Shark Swarm, a film in the Maneater film series, as Professor Bill Girdler. Abraham played Shylock in The Merchant of Venice for the Off-Broadway Theatre for a New Audience (TFANA) in March 2007, which was performed at the Duke Theater in New York and also at the Swan Theater, part of the Royal Shakespeare Company. He reprised this role in February 2011, when he replaced Al Pacino in the Public Theater's production.

Abraham was the primary narrator for the PBS series Nature between 2007 and 2010, narrating 32 episodes (plus one more in 2013). A 2009 guest appearance on Saving Grace began a new phase of Abraham's career, wherein he became gradually more prolific onscreen. Further guest appearances include roles on Law & Order: Criminal Intent, Louie, and Curb Your Enthusiasm, as well as a recurring role on The Good Wife between 2011 and 2014. Abraham's most notable television role came about through Showtime's drama series Homeland, in which he portrayed black ops specialist Dar Adal. This role resulted in his first Emmy Award nomination in 2015, followed by a second in 2018.

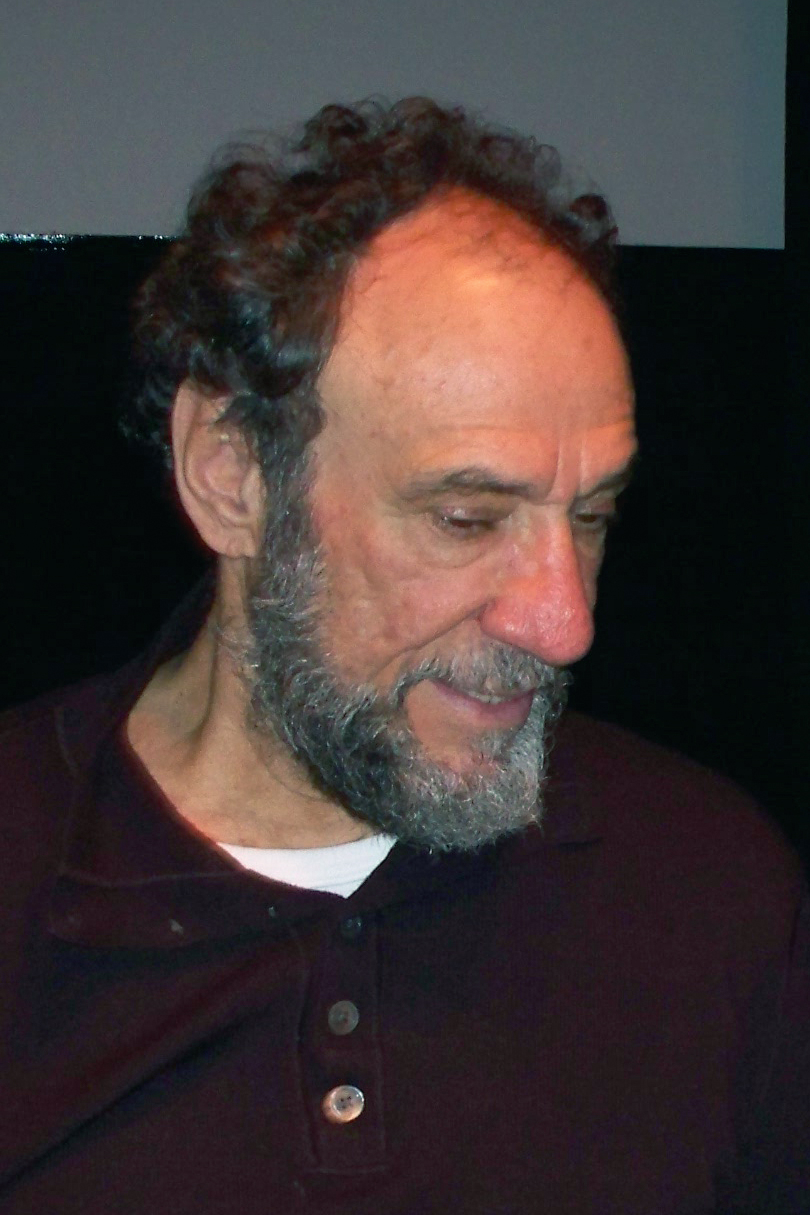
Abraham in 2008.

In the 2010s, he featured prominently in two widely acclaimed films: first as folk music impresario Bud Grossman in the Coen brothers' drama Inside Llewyn Davis (2013), then as the mysterious Mr. Moustafa in Wes Anderson's The Grand Budapest Hotel (2014). He was nominated along with the ensemble for the Screen Actors Guild Award for Outstanding Performance by a Cast in a Motion Picture for the latter. That same year he returned to Broadway portraying Ira Drew in the revival of Terrence McNally's comedic play It's Only a Play. Abraham starred alongside Nathan Lane, Matthew Broderick, Stockard Channing, and Rupert Grint. For his performance he earned a nomination for the Drama Desk Award for Outstanding Featured Actor in a Play. In 2016, he played the title role in Classic Stage Company's production of Nathan the Wise.

He reunited with Wes Anderson voicing a role in stop-motion animated film Isle of Dogs (2018), voiced Grimmel in DreamWorks' How to Train Your Dragon: The Hidden World (2019), and played Tony in the Disney+ 2019 live-action Lady and the Tramp.

From 2020 to 2021 he acted in the Apple TV+ comedy series Mythic Quest. In 2022, he was fired after being accused of inappropriate behavior while on set. In a response statement, Abraham apologized and stated that he never intended "to offend anyone, I told jokes, nothing more, that upset some of my colleagues and as a result lost a great job with wonderful people."

In February 2022, it was revealed that Abraham would be voicing Khonshu in the superhero limited series Moon Knight, set in the Marvel Cinematic Universe. He starred in the 2022 film adaptation of The Magic Flute based on the opera of the same name. That same year he played Dr. Carl Withers in the Netflix series Guillermo del Toro's Cabinet of Curiosities (2022). In 2023, he portrayed Judge John Sirica in the HBO political drama limited series White House Plumbers.

Murray acted in the second season of the HBO series The White Lotus (2022) playing the flirtatious widower Bert Di Grasso, earning nominations for the Golden Globe Award for Best Supporting Actor – Series, Miniseries or Television Film and the Primetime Emmy Award for Outstanding Supporting Actor in a Drama Series. Also in 2023 he acted in the film Mother, Couch alongside Ewan McGregor, Taylor Russell, and Ellen Burstyn. The film premiered at the 2023 Toronto International Film Festival. In 2024 it was announced that Abraham would return to the stage as David Siegel in the Stephen Schwartz musical The Queen of Versailles starring Kristin Chenoweth at the Emerson Colonial Theatre in Boston. The production then moved to Broadway, with previews beginning at the St. James Theatre on October 8, 2025, opening night on November 9, and closing on December 21st after 32 previews and 49 regular performances.

== Personal life ==
=== Marriage ===
Abraham was married to Kate Hannan for 60 years, from 1962 until her death on November 19, 2022. They have two children and one grandchild.

=== Incidents ===
In 1993, while filming the movie Surviving the Game in rural Washington State, Abraham was involved in a car crash in which another driver was killed, while Abraham was injured. In January 2010, Abraham scuffled with a thief in the dressing room area during a public rehearsal at the Classic Stage Company in New York City.

=== Religious beliefs ===
Abraham has spoken about his faith: "I've attended many churches. I grew up as an Orthodox Christian and I was an altar boy. I love the Society of Friends, the Quakers. I attended their meetings for almost fifteen years. I'm now [in 2008] attending the First Presbyterian Church of New York because they're such a generous, terrific church with outreach. They reach out to old people, to homeless, to A.A., to cross-dressers: it's truly a church of the teachings of Christ. Religion is essential to my life."

== Acting credits and accolades ==
Abraham received the Academy Award for Best Actor and the Golden Globe Award for Best Actor in a Motion Picture – Drama for his performance in Amadeus (1984). In his acceptance speech, he praised co-star Tom Hulce, who was also nominated. Abraham also received a nomination for the BAFTA Award for Best Actor in a Leading Role.

He has also received a Grammy Award nomination and four Primetime Emmy Award nominations. He earned four Screen Actors Guild Award nominations with the ensemble casts of Homeland, The Grand Budapest Hotel, and The White Lotus. He was nominated for a Golden Globe for The White Lotus in 2023. He earned two Obie Awards for his work in theater for his performances in Uncle Vanya (1984) and The Merchant of Venice (2011).

In July 2004, at a ceremony in Rome, he was awarded the "Premio per gli Italiani nel Mondo". This is a prize distributed by the Marzio Tremaglia Foundation and the Italian government to Italian emigrants and their descendants who have distinguished themselves abroad.

In 2009, he was recognized by the Alumni Association of the City College of New York with John H. Finley Award in recognition of exemplary dedicated service to the City of New York. In 2010, Abraham was the recipient of the Gielgud Award (Theater) for that year. In 2015, Abraham was an inductee to the American Theater Hall of Fame.

Abraham has an honorary degree from Rider University in Lawrenceville, New Jersey.

== See also ==
- List of actors in Royal Shakespeare Company productions
