= Westgate Resorts =

American resort firm

- Type: Privately held company
- Industry: Real estate; Timeshares
- Founded: 1982; 44 years ago
- Founder: David A. Siegel
- Headquarters: Orlando, Florida, United States
- Key people: Jim Gissy (CEO); Barry W. Siegel (Executive Vice President of Sales)
- Website: www.westgateresorts.com

Westgate Resorts is an American timeshare resort company headquartered in Orlando, Florida. It was founded in 1982 by David A. Siegel with the opening of a 16-unit resort in Kissimmee, Florida. The company has since expanded across the United States and, as of 2025, operates more than 60 properties, including those added through the acquisition of VI Resorts.

== History ==
Westgate Resorts was founded in 1982 by David A. Siegel with the opening of a 16-unit property at Westgate Vacation Villas in Kissimmee, Florida.

Throughout the 1990s and 2000s, Westgate continued to add properties in Las Vegas, Park City, Myrtle Beach, and Branson. Westgate Lakes Resort & Spa opened in 1996, followed by Westgate Towers in 1997; Westgate Town Center and Westgate Smoky Mountain Resort & Spa in 1999; Westgate Flamingo Bay in 2001; Westgate Blue Tree Resort, Westgate Park City Resort & Spa and Westgate River Ranch in 2002; and Westgate Palace and Westgate Historic Williamsburg in 2003.

It operates as a subsidiary of Central Florida Investments, Inc. (CFI), which employs over 10,000 people and has evolved into the largest privately held corporation in the Central Florida area. Siegel opened CFI, a real estate development firm, with an office located in his family garage in 1970.

Siegel was recognized as a CEO of the Year honoree by the Orlando Business Journal in 2014.

In 2016 Westgate Smoky Mountain Resort suffered extensive damage from a fire; rebuilding is said to have begun quickly. In May 2018, musician Barry Manilow returned to Las Vegas as the exclusive headliner at the Westgate International Theater at Westgate Las Vegas Resort & Casino. In June 2018, Westgate acquired the former Hilton New York Grand Central, a 23-floor, 300-room, two-tower hotel in Midtown Manhattan's East Side. It has been rebranded Westgate New York City.

In March 2024, Westgate Resorts appointed longtime company executive Jim Gissy as Chief Executive Officer, succeeded founder David A. Siegel, who transitioned to the role of Executive Chairman and President while continuing to lead the company's strategic direction.

In February 2025, Westgate Resorts announced the acquisition of VI Resorts through its affiliate, Vacation Ownership Sales (VOS). The deal added over 40 properties to Westgate's portfolio, mostly on the U.S. West Coast, and was one of the largest expansions in the company's history.

David Siegel died in April 2025.

=== Legal issues and litigation ===
In 2013, Westgate Resorts was involved in a legal dispute in federal court in Las Vegas concerning construction-related issues at the pH Towers. The case centered on allegations of unpaid bills and substandard building work. On February 27, 2013, Clark County District Judge Elizabeth Gonzalez ordered Westgate Resorts to pay $9 million to Tutor-Saliba Corporation for unpaid bills. The court also awarded Westgate Resorts $2.6 million in damages related to alleged construction deficiencies, including issues such as a cracked concrete swimming pool.

In 2010, Westgate Resorts faced a lawsuit from approximately 300 former sales employees who alleged unpaid sales commissions. The court ruled in favor of the plaintiffs, ordering Westgate to pay $600,000. After an initial payment of $50,000, further payments ceased, leading to continued legal proceedings for an additional three years. The case was ultimately resolved under Judge Michael Baxley, with Westgate agreeing to a settlement of $500,000, which was $100,000 less than the original judgment. In January 2014, Westgate filed lawsuits against several of the former employees involved in the class action, seeking to recover previously paid commissions. Some of the defendants and their legal representatives viewed the action as retaliatory, with one attorney calling it "unconscionable."

On January 20, 2009, Westgate Resorts was found guilty of violating the Telemarketing Sales Rule, including the National Do Not Call Registry provisions, and agreed to a $900,000 settlement with the U.S. government.

In 2012, David Siegel and Westgate Resorts sued the Sundance Institute and the filmmakers of The Queen of Versailles, alleging defamation. The case was stayed in 2013 and sent to arbitration, where the arbitrator ruled in favor of the filmmakers in 2014. Westgate was ordered to pay $750,000, with the arbitrator finding no false content or demonstrated harm, and noting the absence of actual malice required for a defamation claim involving a public figure.

=== Philanthropy ===
Westgate Resorts and the Siegel family have been involved in charitable initiatives, particularly in the areas of youth education and drug prevention. Following the death of their daughter Victoria Siegel in 2015 from a drug overdose, David and Jackie Siegel founded the Victoria’s Voice Foundation, a nonprofit organization focused on substance abuse prevention and education. The foundation promotes awareness campaigns, supports policy initiatives aimed at reducing youth drug use, and provides resources for families and communities addressing addiction. It has partnered with schools, municipalities, and law enforcement agencies to distribute naloxone (Narcan) and expand access to overdose prevention programs.
