= Jerk =

Jerk, The Jerk, Jerks, or Jerking may refer to:

== Arts and entertainment ==
=== Film, stage, and television ===
- Jerk (play), a 2008 puppet play by Dennis Cooper
- Jerk (TV series), a 2019 British sitcom
- The Jerk, a 1979 American film
- "Jerk", an episode of 2 Stupid Dogs
- "The Jerk", an episode of House
- "Jerk" (Space Ghost Coast to Coast), an episode of Space Ghost Coast to Coast

=== Music ===
- Jerk (band), an Australian metal band
- Jerk (album), by hHead, 1994
- "Jerk" (Kim Stockwood song), 1996
- "Jerk" (Oliver Tree song), 2020
- The Jerks, a Filipino rock band

== Other uses ==
- Jerk (physics), an aspect of variable motion
- Half of the clean and jerk, an Olympic weightlifting lift
- Jerk (cooking), a style of cooking native to Jamaica
- Jerk (dance), a 1960s fad dance
- Jerkin', a dance
- Jerking off, slang term for masturbation

== See also ==
- Tim Jerks, Australian football coach
- Geomagnetic jerk
- Hypnic jerk, a kind of muscle twitch
- Soda jerk
- Jurk (disambiguation)
- Jerkin (disambiguation)
- Circle jerk (disambiguation)
