= Homoerotic poetry =

Same-sex romantic or sexual interaction

Homoerotic poetry
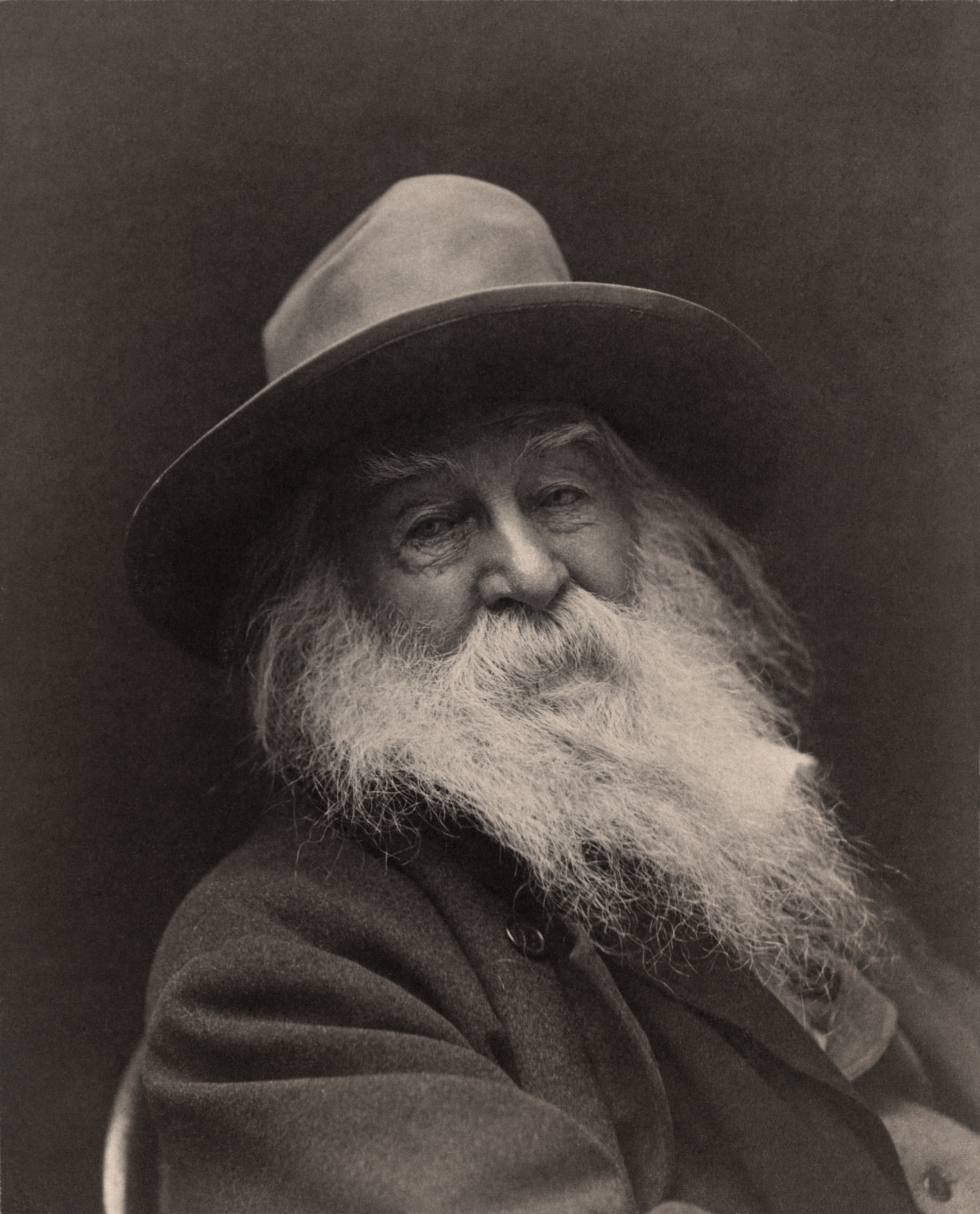
Walt Whitman

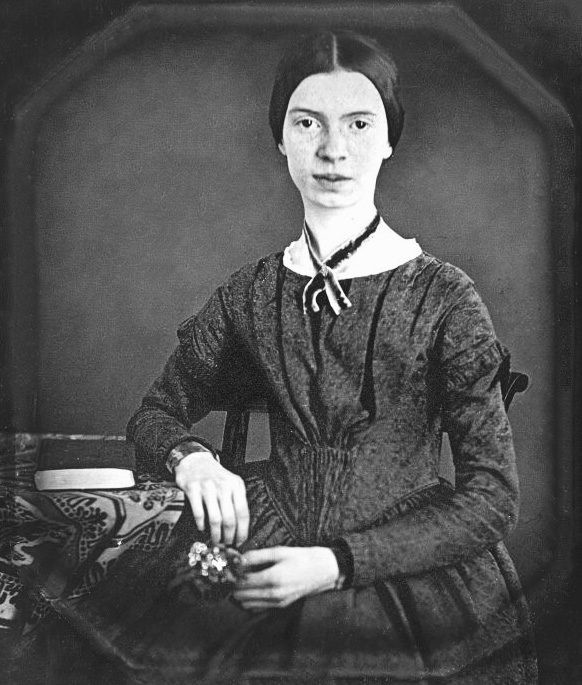
Emily Dickinson

Homoerotic poetry is a genre of poetry implicitly dealing with same-sex romantic or sexual interaction. The male-male erotic tradition encompasses poems by major poets such as Pindar, Theognis of Megara, Anacreon, Catullus, Virgil, Martial, Abu Nuwas, Michelangelo, Walt Whitman, Federico García Lorca, W. H. Auden, and Allen Ginsberg. In the female-female tradition, authors may include those such as Sappho, "Michael Field", "Marie-Madeleine" and Maureen Duffy. Other poets wrote poems and letters with homoerotic overtones toward individuals, such as Emily Dickinson to her sister-in-law Susan Huntington Gilbert.

== English poetry ==
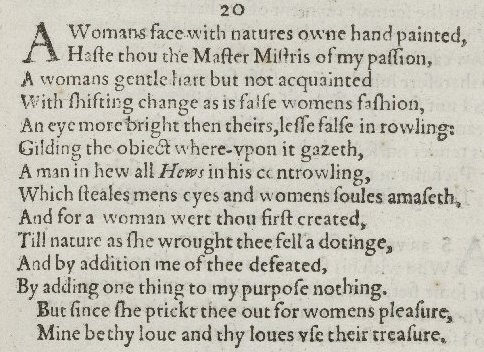
Sonnet 20

The most prominent example in the English language and in the Western canon is that of Sonnet 20 by William Shakespeare. Though some critics have made efforts to preserve Shakespeare's literary credibility by claiming his work to be non-erotic in nature, no critic has disputed that the majority of Shakespeare's sonnets concern explicitly male-male love poetry. The only other Renaissance artist writing in English to do this was the poet Richard Barnfield, who, in The Affectionate Shepherd and Cynthia, wrote homoerotic poetry. Barnfield's poems, furthermore, are now widely accepted as a major influence upon Shakespeare's.

The Uranian poets and prose writers, who sang the praises of the love between men and boys and in doing so often appealed to Ancient Greece, formed a rather cohesive group with a well-expressed philosophy. Though often anonymously or pseudonymously published or privately circulated, Uranian poetry flourished as a subculture in England in the latter half of the 19th century and the first decades of the 20th century.

During the 19th century the British gay poet Digby Mackworth Dolben was little known; however, in the last decade Lord Alfred Douglas produced a major volume of Dolben's homoerotic poems (1896) published in Paris, written in both English and French translations after the trial of Oscar Wilde for homosexual offences brought about largely by Wilde's love for Douglas. Wilde in De Profundis, a poem about his prison experiences which broke him and led to his death in 1900 in Paris, produced an enduring poem. At the same time A. E. Housman gave voice to gay feelings of fear and guilt in a still-criminalized situation in his A Shropshire Lad (1896). In the twentieth century Noël Coward wrote witty gay poems while the magician Aleister Crowley wrote works in English.

In the twentieth century, W. H. Auden and Allen Ginsberg became well known as poets. In Great Britain the pederast Ralph Chubb lived in poverty and produced his own books in limited editions made from illustrated engravings (similar to methods employed by William Blake), which he then erased.

The British savant Anthony Reid created the largest male homosexual anthology of poems: The Eternal Flame (2 volumes, 1992–2002) which he worked on for nearly fifty years; publication of the second volume was held up by the publisher going bankrupt. The Canadian gay poet Ian Young produced the first major bibliography with his works The Male Homosexual in Literature (2 editions, the second being expanded). The Australian gay poet Paul Knobel's CD-ROM 'An Encyclopedia of Male Homosexual Poetry and its Reception History' (2002) is the largest survey of the subject and comes to one million words with overviews covering over 250 languages and language groups. He has also published A World Overview of Male Homosexual Poetry (2005). Gregory Woods has produced other studies, including a history of gay literature with some reference to poetry.

The period since gay liberation (from 1968) has produced dozens of gay poetry anthologies (e.g. 2 edited by Ian Young alone and others by Winston Leyland producer of the gay lib periodical Gay Sunshine, which included poetry); this has mainly been the result of the increasing decriminalisation of gay sex in the Anglo world (male homosexual acts were decriminalized in France in the late 18th century and in Italy in the late 19th). Notable United States gay poets include Dennis Cooper, Gavin Dillard, John Gill, Dennis Kelly, Tom Meyer, Paul Monette, Harold Norse and Jonathan Williams. Rob Jacques has written about the relationship between love and violence in the military. James S. Holmes was a leather poet who emigrated to Amsterdam. Daryl Hine from Canada and David Herkt and Paul Knobel from Australia have written fine gay poems. New Zealand has a vibrant gay culture and has produced some gay poets. The Canadian gay poet Edward A. Lacey was run over in the street while drunk in Bangkok; repatriated to Canada, he remained bedridden until his death. His complete poems were only published in the early 21st century. The British poet Thom Gunn lived in the United States and wrote a notable volume inspired by AIDS (which has produced several anthologies).

== European poetry ==
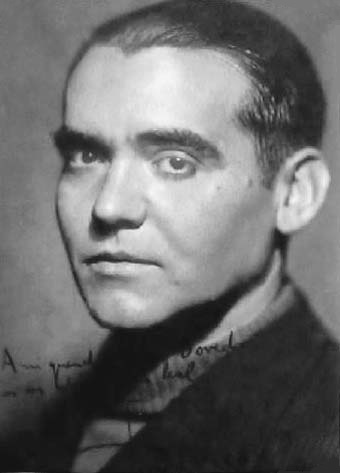
Federico García Lorca

The first modern European gay anthology was Lieblingminne und Freundesliebe in der Weltliteratur compiled by Elisar von Kupffer (1900) in German; it was followed by the poetry and prose anthology Iolaus compiled by the homosexual British socialist Edward Carpenter, which has remained in print almost continuously until today. The 1978 anthology French gay anthology with much poetry and excellent illustrations, L'Amour bleu (French for "blue love", that is, forbidden love) has been translated into German and English and remains in print.

Italian has Michelangelo, the Renaissance painter and sculptor, who wrote homosexual love sonnets while Sandro Penna and Dario Bellezza are twentieth century poets. The Venetian gay poet Mario Stefani died in still unexplained circumstances in the early 21st century. Renzo Paris is a notable contemporary poet.

In French there were Rimbaud and Verlaine, who were lovers; some of Verlaine's poems published in the early 1890s were the first open modern French gay poems and influenced Oscar Wilde. Jean Cocteau wrote in the twentieth century where Jean Genet also wrote some gay poems.

In German Adolf Brand wrote gay poetry in the early part of the twentieth century as well as producing the major gay periodical Der Eigene (The Special; 1898–1931), which published gay poetry. The Swiss gay magazine Der Kreis (The circle) carried the flame of gay poetry in the Second World War when the Nazi regime in Germany imprisoned many homosexuals, leading to their deaths. Nils Hallbeck was a Swedish gay poet and in the opinion of Anthony Reid, his English translator, one of the finest gay poets ever. Danish and Dutch have also produced fine gay poets. Gertrud von Puttkamer wrote lesbian-themed poetry in the early to mid 1900s.

Spain produced García Lorca, who was shot in the Spanish Civil War; Lorca and others appear in the anthology Amores iguales (2002) by Antonio de Villena. Antonio Botto is the best known Portuguese poet to write open gay poems; he later lived in Brazil where he died. In Brazil, a gay anthology was produced in 1978 called Poemas do amor mandate (Poems of doomed love).

== Hispano-Arabic ==
It started to gain importance in the beginning of the 9th century, during the reign of Abderraman II.

The fall of the Caliphate of Córdoba in the 11th century and the subsequent rule of the Almoravids—as well as the division into the Taifa kingdoms—decentralized the culture throughout al-Andalus. This produced producing an era of splendor in poetry.

The Almohad invasion brought the emergence of all kinds of new literary courts in the centuries 12th and 13th. The greater female autonomy in this North African ethnic group led to the appearance of a greater number of female poets as well—some of whom also created poems that sang of feminine beauty.

== Baltic and middle eastern ==
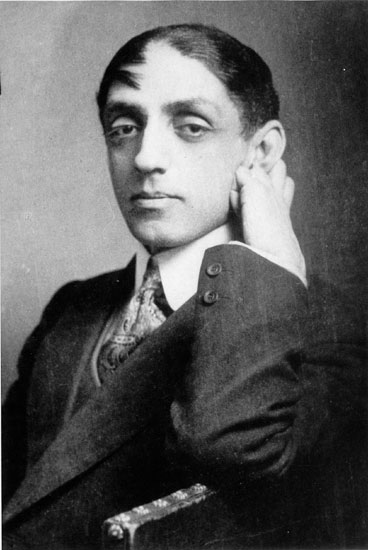
Kuzmin

Russia has Mikhail Kuzmin and Gennady Trifonov (who was imprisoned for writing homosexual poems which were not published at the time). Valery Pereleshin lived in exile in Brazil where he produced a significant body of gay poetry. Poland had gay poets in the early part of the twentieth century and has an increasingly open gay culture. Brane Mozetic writes in Slovene.

Turkey has a huge gay poetry heritage as does medieval Hebrew. Hebrew gay poetry has been discussed by Norman Roth, Jefim Schirmann and Dan Pagis and dates from the Middle Ages in Spain. C. M. Naim surveyed gay poetry in an article in Studies in the Urdu ghazal and Prose Fiction (1979) and Ralph Russell has dealt with the subject in various books.

== China ==
The homoerotic poetry in Chinese cultural style, the relationships between human were not grouped by homosexual or straight like we have in modern time, so usually all the homoerotic poetry in ancient China were understood by expression of emotion feeling or relationships in human society. One of the most classic examples are Song of the Yue Boatman.

There was Pre-Qin and Han dynasty record about intimate relationships between male, such as the “shared peach” story from Warring States period and “Cut Sleeve” from Emperor Ai in Han and Dong Xian. All those cases showing during ancient China mostly in the rich/high social hierarchy, the homosexual relationships were really rare. It usually explained by personal feeling or part of the power structure but not as single sexual orientation. During these history context, the expression about male of “Song of the Yue Boatman”, could be the explained by the early emotion cultural expression about ancient Chinese male. In the other hand the male back to that time could be make other intimate relationships with others in the social spots like hotel, tea house, etc while still doing their family works while and in marriage under the social system. When it comes Wei and Jin period, the culture start showing as individuality and authentic emotions, which caused male intimate relationships and appreciation to each other much oblivious compared to before. Even though the literature was more focusing on “light” and gentle during that time period. But scholars believed, those kinds of works and action that emphasized the male emotion cross communication and cultural environment built the root for the homosexual relationship books for the next generations.

The Song of the Yue Boatman could be treated as earlier ancient Chinese intimate relationships poetry, but the homosexual relationships, but as culture background back to the past, these kinds of relationships were not the main stream back to that time, but more built on the specific politics and social structure.

Origin song:

What evening is this, that I row my boat in the middle of the stream?

What day is this, that I may share a boat with the prince?

Though I am of humble standing, I do not feel disgrace.

My heart is troubled yet unbroken, for I have come to know the prince.

There are trees in the mountains, and branches upon the trees;

My heart delights in you, yet you do not know.

The song itself described as 5th century BCE in Spring and Autumn period. Story happened between an Yue boatman and nobleman of Chu State. The song was part of the whole text preserved in the West Han, ShuoYuan written by Liu Xiang.

This time period were the era of huge political action, all the directors of the State either communicate or conflicted often. At the center of the Chu State was the important area of the Chinese culture and communication spot of the hundred families. Yue people was the southern groups who has huge difference compared to northern communities.

The song repeated used date phrases for expressing emotions, it shows the fate meetup between the main characters of the text. But the boatmen knows he has huge social hierarchy difference between nobleman and himself. The poetry mentioned shame but also “shameless”, it shows he is hesitate and shy because his own identity but the power of emotion and love took over and beat the self-degrade. The “heart delight” shows the asymmetry, nobleman did not show rejection but also unknown. The expression of restraint is related to traditional emotions and lyrical style of Chinese culture.

From the thoughts of the poem, we can see the emotions or love could cross the boarder of social status, it emphasized the true feeling of the heart but not the external personal identity. At cultural side, we can see the emotions dimensions of the ancient Chinese man, but the expression still focus on the symbolization about “light” love. Social identity should not be fixed by single description, but should be through the social relations and power structures when emotions and attachment are expressed The poem used extreme simple language to describe the emotions, identity and social structures and how they connect and affected each other.

== See also ==
- Trans poetry
