= Cy Gavin =

American painter

Cy Gavin (born 1985) is an American artist, in paint, sculpture, performance art, and video, who lives and works in New York. Gavin has often incorporated unusual materials in his paintings such as tattoo ink, pink sand, diamonds, staples, and seeds. Gavin is currently represented by Gagosian Gallery.

== Early life and education ==
Gavin was born in Pittsburgh, Pennsylvania and grew up 20 miles south of Pittsburgh in a steel and coal mining town called Donora, Pennsylvania. Both Gavin's mother and father worked in the region's glass factories.

Gavin graduated from Carnegie Mellon University in 2007 and Columbia University School of the Arts in 2016.

== Work ==
After graduating from Carnegie Mellon, Gavin moved to San Francisco and worked in post-production for several years before relocating to New York in 2010. In New York, Gavin worked as Associate Producer for avant-garde opera company, Beth Morrison Projects, as Web Content Manager for non-profit gallery PARTICIPANT INC, and served as archivist for Vito Acconci.

Fugue States, Overture, At Heaven's Command, and Rubell Foundation Residency

Gavin's first solo exhibition, Fugue States, opened at Revision Space (Cindy Lisica Gallery) in February 2014, followed by his debut New York solo exhibition, titled Overture, at Sargent's Daughters in July 2015. Twelve mixed-media paintings were shown. The works explored the artist's childhood, specifically his relationship with his father, as well as the "double consciousness" of black life in America. Gavin often paints his abstracted figures using a unique combination of paints that render the subject in "ultra-black" and contrasts the figure's austerity with bright, saturated colors for the landscapes and backgrounds.

The show opened to positive reviews from critics. Martha Schwendener from The New York Times wrote that Gavin makes, "the backgrounds of his paintings as attention-grabbing as the figures. Craggy and sculpted, they conjure the terrain of the islands, but also canvases by Francis Bacon, Gauguin and Cézanne, whose landscapes look as if they were chiseled onto the canvas."

Gavin's third solo exhibition, titled At Heaven's Command, opened at Sargent's Daughters in April 2016. The show included more of Gavin's hybrid paintings as well as new video works. Gavin spent the previous year in Bermuda and used his time on the island to research his paternal genealogy and the complicated history of the Slave Trade on the island. The title for the exhibition was taken from the first line of the British anthem "Rule, Britannia," which was written during Bermuda's slave period.

Later in 2016, Gavin was included in the group exhibition High Anxiety at the Rubell Family Collection in Miami, Florida. Gavin also held a six-month residency at the Rubell Foundation during this time.

In 2017, Gavin moved his studio from New York City to upstate New York.

Gavin's third solo exhibition, Devils Isle, opened in early 2018 in Paris, France at VNH Gallery.

On March 3, 2019, Gavin Brown's enterprise opened an exhibition of paintings by Gavin. It was the artist's first show with the gallery and was met with favorable reviews. Poet and critic Shiv Kotecha wrote for Frieze Magazine, " Gavin has painted a suite of five rapturous landscapes that channel the cries of condemned and enslaved bodies under the domicile of empire. Like Gavin’s earlier works, which depict the black body in motion, these are ‘portraits’ of landscape, which is to say that they don't depict their pastoral subjects – a thrashing waterfall, a brimming surf, a dark grotto – as much as they enact the scene of recognition on which portraiture is usually predicated."

On April 6, 2022, Cy Gavin has his work ‘untitled’ shown in the 2022 Whitney Biennial ‘ Quiet as it’s kept’ alongside sixty-three other artists at the Whitney Museum of American Art. The work is a painting that Gavin made during a lockdown.

In 2023, Gavin gained representation with Gagosian Gallery, and he has since exhibited with the galleries in New York (2023), Beverly Hills (2024), Rome (2024), and Hong Kong (2025).

Gavin's blue carpet was "front and center" at the Met Gala in 2025.

== Themes ==
Style

Many of Gavin's paintings explore ideas of, "identity and disarticulation from one's culture that relate to the artist's own relationship to the United States of America, Africa, Bermuda and the history of slavery that remains institutionally obfuscated on the island." Gavin often critiques various notions of identity, history, and colonialism and has incorporated complicated themes of land, sexuality, elation and euphoria, trauma, and the African diaspora in his paintings and video works.

Influences

Gavin has stated that his work has been strongly influenced by the writings of historian and activist W.E.B. Dubois, especially his The Souls of Black Folk. Dubois and Nkisi Nkondi, objects infused with spirits and religious idols from the Kongo, were central to his paintings in Overture.

== Exhibitions ==
Solo exhibitions

- Cy Gavin, Gavin Brown's enterprise, New York, 2019
- Devils' Isle, VNH gallery, Paris, France, 2017
- At Heaven's Command, Sargent's Daughters, New York, 2016
- Overture, Sargent's Daughters, New York, NY 2015
- Fugue States, Revision Space (Cindy Lisica Gallery), Pittsburgh, 2014

Selected group exhibitions

- 2022 Whitney Biennial titled "Quiet as It's Kept"
- The Lure of the Dark: Contemporary Painters Conjure the Night, MASS MoCA, North Adams, MA, 2018
- Between the Waters, Whitney Museum of American Art, New York, NY 2018
- Hecate, Various Small Fires, Los Angeles, CA, 2017
- Dirge, JTT, New York, NY, 2017
- Frame By Frame, Callicoon Fine Arts, New York, NY, 2017
- High Anxiety, Rubell Family Collection, Miami, FL 2016
