= Robbie Coburn =

Australian poet

- Known for: Poetry, young adult fiction
- Notable work: The Foal in the Wire
- Website: www.robbiecoburn.com

Robbie Coburn is an Australian poet and young adult author.

== Career ==
Coburn’s first published poem appeared in poet Pi O's literary journal Unusual Work when he was 17 years old. His poems have appeared in Poetry, Poetry Salzburg Review, Hobart, Meanjin, Island, Westerly, and elsewhere. His work has also been included in many anthologies. He is the author of several poetry collections, including And I Could Not Have Hurt You (Kiddiepunk, 2023), which was included on Dennis Cooper’s Mine for yours: favorites of 2023 list, as well as a number of chapbooks and zines.

His debut young adult verse novel, The Foal in the Wire, was published by Hachette Australia in 2025 and was shortlisted for multiple awards, including the Prime Minister’s Literary Award for Young Adult Literature.

Sonya Hartnett described The Foal in the Wire as “the real deal” and Kevin Brooks said the story “will stay with you forever”. The book also received praise from Ron Koertge, Steven Herrick and Louis Nowra.

== Awards ==
- 2026 – Indie Book Awards Book of the Year – Young Adult, The Foal in the Wire, Finalist
- 2026 – Ena Noël Award, The Foal in the Wire, Shortlisted
- 2026 – Children's Book of the Year Award: Older Readers, The Foal in the Wire, Notable Book
- 2026 – Prime Minister's Literary Awards – Young Adult Fiction, The Foal in the Wire, Finalist

== Selected works ==
Young adult verse novels

- The Foal in the Wire (Lothian Children’s Books, 2025)

Poetry collections

- The Other Flesh (UWA Publishing, 2019)
- And I Could Not Have Hurt You (Kiddiepunk, 2023)
- Ghost Poetry (Upswell Publishing, 2024)

Selected list of poems

- "Shock Lessons, a Paddock Scripture", Poetry, May 2016
- "Convalescence", Meanjin, October 2018
