= LGBTQ rights in Russia =

- Legal status: Same-sex sexual activity legal since 1917, criminalized in 1934 (except for women) and decriminalized again since 1993. (Note: Russian Criminal Enforcement Code designates "buggery" and "lesbianism" as "egregious breach of prison order".) "Promotion" of LGBTQ identity illegal since 2013 (to minors) and 2022 (to adults). Public expression of LGBTQ identity banned since 2023
- Gender identity: Gender change legal between 1997 and 2023, illegal afterwards
- Military: Yes
- Discrimination protections: None

Family rights
- Recognition of relationships: No recognition of same-sex unions
- Restrictions: Same-sex marriage constitutionally banned since 2020 (Note: In the 2020 amendments to the Constitution of Russia, marriage is defined as being between a man and woman, thereby banning same-sex marriage.)
- Adoption: No

Lesbian, gay, bisexual, transgender, and queer (LGBTQ) people in Russia face severe challenges and discrimination not experienced by non-LGBTQ people. Although sexual activity between consenting adults of the same sex is legal, homosexuality is disapproved of by much of the population, and same-sex couples and households headed by same-sex couples are ineligible for the legal protections available to opposite-sex couples. Russia provides no anti-discrimination protections for LGBTQ people and does not have a designation for hate crimes based on sexual orientation and gender identity. Transgender people are not allowed to change their legal gender, and gender-affirming care is banned. It is illegal to distribute materials that promote "non-traditional" sexual relationships or make minors interested in gender transition, and the "international LGBT public movement" has been designated as an extremist group.

In December 1917, after the October Revolution, the Russian Soviet Republic (later the Russian SFSR) decriminalised homosexuality. However, the Soviet Union under Joseph Stalin would later recriminalise sex between men in March 1934 with the addition of Article 154-a to the Soviet Criminal Code, which punished consensual sexual activity between men with three to five years' imprisonment. The revised criminal code of 1961 continued to classify sexual relations between men as a crime, relocating it to Article 121 and providing for only a maximum of five years' imprisonment for consensual sex. Western observers estimated that, during the Soviet era, between 800 and 1000 men were imprisoned per year under Article 121. After the dissolution of the Soviet Union, homosexual acts between consenting males were re-legalised in 1993 (they had not been criminalised for women), removing Article 121 from the RSFSR Penal Code.

Russia has long held strongly traditionalist conservative views regarding homosexuality, and anti-LGBTQ sentiment and policies intensified under president Vladimir Putin. In 2010, the European Court of Human Rights fined Russia for discriminating against the LGBTQ community, after local governments systemically refused to issue permits to pride parades. In 2013, Russia passed a law criminalising the distribution of "propaganda" promoting "non-traditional sexual relationships" among minors; the law was met with condemnation from international politicians, LGBT rights activists, and human rights activists, and has been credited with fuelling a significant increase in homophobic hate crimes in the country over the course of the decade. In a report issued on 13 April 2017, a panel of five expert advisors to the United Nations Human Rights Council condemned the wave of torture and killings of gay men in Chechnya.

Amid the Russo-Ukrainian war, Russia intensified its anti-LGBTQ policies, particularly against transgender people: in 2022, the "propaganda" law was expanded to apply to anyone regardless of age group, and to also prohibit the distribution of materials that make minors interested in gender transitions. In 2023, Russian passed a bill banning gender-affirming care and legal gender changes, and in 2024 passed a law banning the adoption of Russian children by citizens or permanent residents of countries that allow gender transitions. In November 2023, the Supreme Court issued a ruling designating "the international LGBT public movement" as an extremist group, making it illegal to participate in LGBT activism; the ruling has led to the arrests of gay bar owners, as well as people who display symbols such as the rainbow flag, by Russian authorities on charges of promoting extremism.

In 2016, Russia was rated the second least LGBTQ-friendly nation in Europe by ILGA-Europe. In 2024, the status of LGBTQ rights in Russia was ranked the worst out of the 49 countries surveyed within Europe, followed by Turkey in 47th and Azerbaijan in 48th.

== History ==
The first recorded legal bans on male homosexuality were passed in 1716 under Tsar Peter the Great as part of his efforts to Westernize and modernize the Russian Empire. This consisted of a ban on sodomy in the military, but he failed to extend these restrictions to the general population. In 1832, Tsar Nicholas I banned sodomy, which was punishable by exile to Siberia for four to five years.

=== Soviet Russia ===
In the wake of the October Revolution, Russia underwent a sexual revolution and became one of the first countries to decriminalise male same-sex relations. The Bolsheviks rewrote the constitution and "produced two Criminal Codes – in 1922 and 1926 – and an article prohibiting homosexual sex was left off both." The new Communist Party government removed the old laws regarding sexual relations, effectively legalising homosexual intercourse within Russia, although it remained illegal in other territories of the Soviet Union, and homosexuals in Russia were still persecuted and often sacked from their jobs or faced violence.

Under Joseph Stalin, the Soviet Union recriminalised homosexuality in a decree signed in 1933. The new Article 154-a, later relocated to Article 121 in 1961, punished sexual relations between men with between three and five years' imprisonment and led to several raids and arrests. Female homosexuals were also often sent to mental institutions. The decree was part of a broader campaign against "deviant" behaviour and "Western degeneracy". Homosexuality was portrayed in society as an area of activity for pedophiles, fascists and nobility.

Following Stalin's death, there was a liberalisation of attitudes toward sexual issues in the Soviet Union, but homosexual acts remained illegal. Discrimination against LGBTQ individuals persisted in the Soviet era, and homosexuality was not officially declassified as a mental illness until 1999.

Soviet Article 121 was often commonly used to extend prison sentences and to control dissidents. Among those imprisoned were the well-known film director Sergei Paradjanov and the poet Gennady Trifonov. Under Mikhail Gorbachev's administration in the late 1980s, the first gay organisation came into being. The Moscow Gay & Lesbian Alliance was headed by Yevgeniya Debryanskaya and Roman Kalinin, who became the editor of the first officially registered gay newspaper, Tema.

=== Russian Federation ===
The fall of the USSR accelerated the progress of the gay movement in Russia. Gay publications and plays appeared. In 1992, President Boris Yeltsin issued a decree repealing Article 121; however, those previously convicted under this article were not officially amnestied. In 1999, Russia adopted the ICD-10 standards, thereby removing homosexuality from the national registry of recognised diseases.

In 2004, Russian State Duma member Alexander Chuyev introduced a bill to ban "homosexual propaganda", but the Prime Minister's office opposed the bill, noting that it would violate the Russian Constitution and the European Convention on Human Rights. There were attempts to ban "homosexual propaganda" in Russia in 2003, 2004, and 2006, each opposed by government. Human Rights First attributes these events to the decriminalisation of homosexuality and growing personal freedom in Russia, as a result of which LGBTQ people desired to live more openly; however, "homophobia and antigay hate crime remained serious problems".

In April 2007, LGBTQ activists sent a letter to the Ministry of Health, demanding that the ban on blood donation by homosexual men be lifted, calling such a ban "discriminatory and destructive not only for homosexuals", and that the Ministry of Health's order of 14 September 2001 be revised. On 16 April 2008, the Minister of Health Tatyana Golikova issued the order "On Amending the Order of the Ministry of Health of the Russian Federation of 14 September 2001 No. 364 "On Approval of the Procedure for Medical Examination of a Blood Donor and its Components," thereby lifting the ban on blood donation by men who have sex with men. The order was registered with the Ministry of Justice on 13 May 2008 and came into force on 23 May.

In 2007, Human Rights Watch and the International Lesbian, Gay, Bisexual, Trans and Intersex Association noted that there was an attack on the civil rights of LGBTQ people in Russia, a shrinking space for discussing homosexuality, censorship in the media, and persecution of dissidents.

According to Human Rights Watch, public statements by the leadership of the Russian Orthodox Church show signs of inciting hatred towards LGBTQ people. In June 2011, the ROC presented to the Council of Europe a report by Russian lawyers, "On the Right to Critical Evaluation of Homosexuality and on Legal Restrictions on the Imposition of Homosexuality", the essence of which, according to the Moscow Helsinki Group, is an attack on LGBTQ rights using homophobic arguments.

In 2013, following the adoption of the federal law against "propaganda of homosexuality", attacks on LGBTQ events intensified. British human rights activist Peter Tatchell noted that there is a tendency for homophobic repression to escalate in Russia, including criminal liability for freedom of expression, a ban on adoption of children by foreign homosexual couples, and the designation of LGBTQ organisations that receive grants from abroad as "foreign agents". Human Rights First links the persecution of dissenters, including the persecution of LGBTQ citizens, to the response to the 2011–2013 Russian protests. In its opinion, Putin began to actively oppose LGBTQ rights in order to strengthen his influence within the country and distract attention from other problems.

In May 2019, ILGA-Europe placed Russia in 46th place among 49 European countries in terms of homophobia.

== Current situation ==
- The age of consent currently stands at 16 since 2003, regardless of sexual orientation.
- Homosexuality was officially removed from the Russian list of mental illnesses in 1999 (after the endorsement of the World Health Organization's ICD-10 classifications). However, there is a movement within Russia to bring it back. The Russian government introduced new laws on 1 July 2023 to effectively reinstate the classification of homosexuality as a mental illness.
- Single persons living within Russia, regardless of their sexual orientation, can adopt children. Russian children can be adopted by a single person who lives in a foreign country provided that country neither recognise same-sex marriage nor gender transition. A couple can adopt children together, as a couple, only if they are a married heterosexual couple.
- The Russian constitution guarantees the right of peaceful association. Nevertheless, organs of authority in Russia refuse to register LGBTQ organisations, and pro-LGBTQ advocacy groups have been declared extremist organisations and therefore prohibited from operating within Russian territory.

=== Same-sex unions ===
Neither same-sex marriages nor civil unions of same-sex couples are allowed in Russia. In July 2013, Patriarch Kirill, the leader of the Russian Orthodox Church, of which approximately 71% of Russians are adherents, said that the idea of same-sex marriage was "a very dangerous sign of the Apocalypse". At a 2011 press conference, the head of the Moscow Registry Office, Irina Muravyova, declared: "Attempts by same-sex couples to marry both in Moscow and elsewhere in Russia are doomed to fail. We live in a civil society, we are guided by the federal law, by the Constitution that clearly says: marriage in Russia is between a man and a woman. Such a marriage cannot be contracted in Russia." The vast majority of the Russian public are also against same-sex marriage. In July 2020, Russian voters approved a Constitution amendment banning same-sex marriage. In the 2021 case Fedotova and Others v. Russia, the European Court of Human Rights in Strasbourg ruled that it was a violation of human rights for Russia not to offer any form of legal recognition to same-sex relationships. However, Russia left the court in 2022.

=== Military service ===
Before 1993, homosexual acts between consenting males were against the law in Russia, and homosexuality was considered a mental disorder until adoption of ICD-10 in 1999, but even after that military medical expertise statute was in force to continue considering homosexuality a mental disorder which was a reason to deny homosexuals to serve in the military. On 1 July 2003, a new military medical expertise statute was adopted; it said people "who have problems with their identity and sexual preferences" can only be drafted during war times. However, this clause contradicted another clause of the same statute which stated that different sexual orientation should not be considered a deviation. This ambiguity was resolved by the Major-General of the Medical Service Valery Kulikov who clearly stated that the new medical statute "does not forbid people of non-standard sexual orientation from serving in the military." However, he added that people of non-standard sexual orientation should not reveal their sexual orientation while serving in the army because "other soldiers are not going to like that; they can be beaten". President Vladimir Putin said in a U.S. television interview in 2010 that openly gay men were not excluded from military service in Russia. In 2013, it was reported that the Defense Ministry had issued a guideline on assessment of new recruits' mental health that recommends recruits be asked about their sexual history and be examined for certain types of tattoos, especially genital or buttocks tattoos, that would allegedly indicate a homosexual orientation.

In April and May 2023 there was a proposed crackdown on gender transition. The Russian State Duma considered passing new laws to prevent trans women from changing their legal gender from male to female without surgery. The proposed changes, as first discussed by the Russian Minister of Justice, Konstantin Chuychenko, in April were to "rule out the possibility of changing a person's gender purely by changing the documents." Duma Committee on Family, Women, and Children's Affairs head Nina Ostanina said: "Amendments will soon be introduced in the State Duma to officially ban gender reassignment without surgery". In part it was claimed to be protecting "family values" in Russia. However, Russian men have considered changing their legal gender to avoid being drafted. According to one Russian source "In connection with the special operation, many young men have turned to private clinics to provide a sex change to avoid conscription." Vyacheslav Volodin, Speaker of the Duma, claims that some "2,700" such decisions have been made in "recent times". In July 2023, Russia enacted a law banning gender transition which prohibited both gender-affirming surgery and legal gender recognition outright.

=== Gay pride events ===
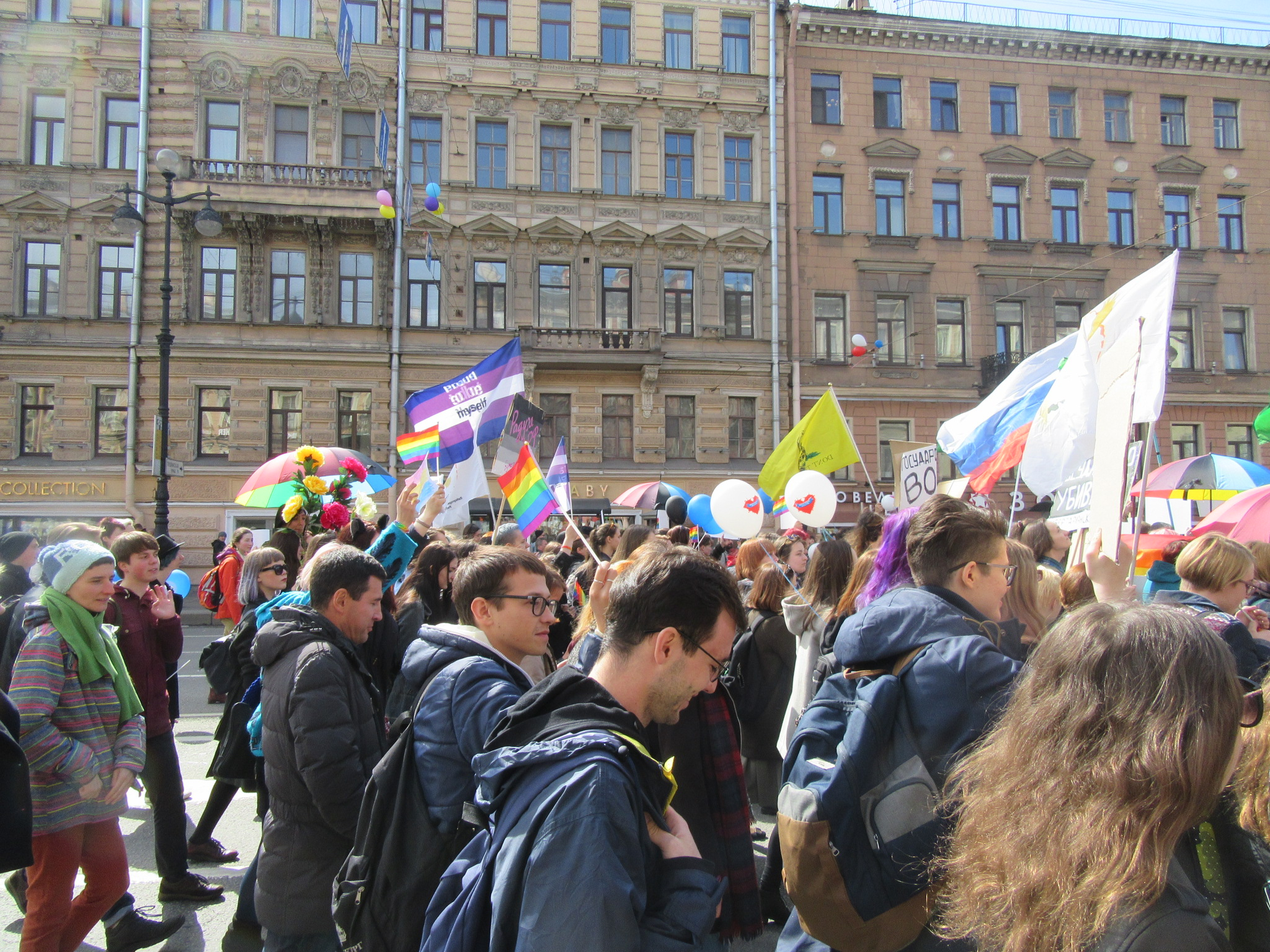
LGBT activists in Saint Petersburg, Russia, 1 May 2017

There have been notable objections to the organisation of gay pride parades in several Russian cities, most prominently Moscow, where authorities have never approved a request to hold a gay pride rally. Former Moscow mayor Yuri Luzhkov supported the city's refusal to authorize the first two editions of Nikolay Alexeyev's Moscow Pride events, calling them as "satanic". The events still went on as planned, in defiance of their lack of authorisation. In 2010, Russia was fined by the European Court of Human Rights, ruling that, as alleged by Alexeyev, Russian cities were discriminating against the gay community by refusing to authorize pride parades. Although authorities had claimed allowing pride events to be held would pose a risk of violence, the Court ruled that their decisions "effectively approved of and supported groups who had called for [their] disruption." In August 2012, contravening the previous ruling, the Moscow City Court upheld a ruling blocking requests by the organisers of Moscow Pride for permits to hold the parade yearly through 2012, citing the possibility of public disorder and a lack of support for such events by residents of Moscow.

=== Chechnya ===
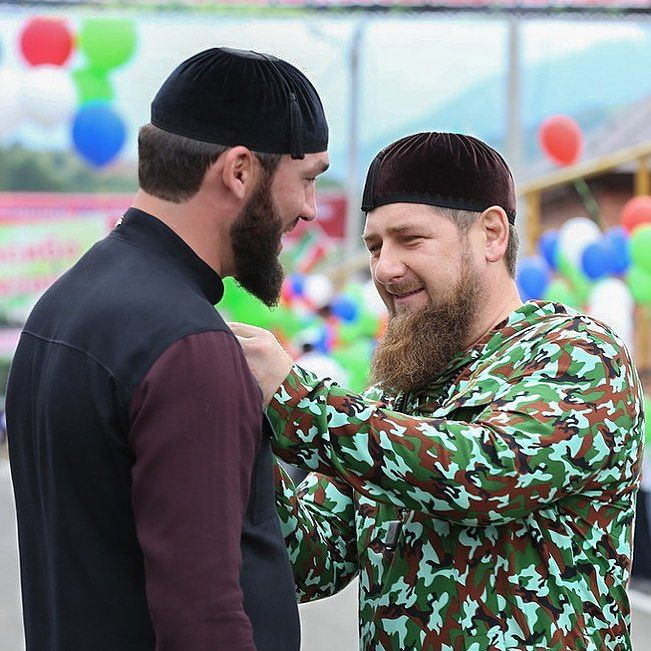
Chechen leader Ramzan Kadyrov (right) with Chechnya's parliamentary chairman Magomed Daudov

Anti-gay purges in the Chechen Republic have included forced disappearances — secret abductions, imprisonment, and torture — by authorities targeting persons based on their perceived sexual orientation. An unknown number of men, who authorities detained on suspicion of being gay or bisexual, have reportedly died after being held in what human rights groups and eyewitnesses have called concentration camps.

Allegations were initially reported on 1 April 2017 in Novaya Gazeta, a Russian-language opposition newspaper, which reported that since February 2017 over 100 men had allegedly been detained and tortured and at least three had died in an extrajudicial killing. The paper, citing its sources in the Chechen special services, called the wave of detentions a "prophylactic sweep". The journalist who first reported on the subject went into hiding. There have been calls for reprisals against journalists who report on the situation.

As news spread of Chechen authorities' actions, which have been described as part of a systematic anti-LGBTQ purge, Russian and international activists scrambled to evacuate survivors of the camps and other vulnerable Chechens but were met with difficulty obtaining visas to conduct them safely beyond Russia.

The reports of the persecution were met with a variety of reactions worldwide. The Head of the Chechen Republic Ramzan Kadyrov denied not only the occurrence of any persecution but also the existence of gay men in Chechnya, adding that such people would be killed by their own families. Officials in Moscow were sceptical, although in late May the Russian government reportedly agreed to send an investigative team to Chechnya. Numerous national leaders and other public figures in the West condemned Chechnya's actions, and protests were held in Russia and elsewhere. A report released in December 2018 by the Organization for Security and Cooperation in Europe (OSCE) confirmed claims that persecution of LGBTQ persons had taken place and was ignored by authorities.

On 11 January 2019, it was reported that another 'gay purge' had begun in the country in December 2018, with several gay men and women being detained. The Russian LGBT Network believes that around 40 persons were detained and two killed.

In March 2021, Reuters reported that the European Union imposed economic sanctions on two Chechen officials accused of persecuting LGBTQ people in Chechnya.

=== Declaration of the LGBTQ movement as extremism ===
In November 2023, the Supreme Court of Russia declared the "international LGBT movement" to be an "extremist" organisation, following a Ministry of Justice lawsuit citing "various signs of an extremist orientation." On 22 March 2024, the "international LGBT social movement and its structural units" (Russian: Международное общественное движение ЛГБТ и его структурные подразделения) was formally added to the "unified list of terrorist and extremist organizations and persons".

The decision was seen as part of President Putin's campaign to emphasize traditional values, and was criticised by LGBTQ and human rights advocates for effectively criminalizing LGBTQ advocacy; under Russian law, leading, participating in, financially supporting, or repeatedly displaying the symbols of an extremist organisation is a criminal offense punishable by prison time. Amnesty International described the ruling as being "shameful and absurd." In response to the ruling, a group of Russian LGBTQ activists—including Russian LGBT Network founder Igor Kochetkov—formed an organisation literally named "International LGBT Movement" in an attempt to argue for its defense in the Supreme Court, as the original ruling was the result of a closed-door hearing with no defendants present.

Since the ruling, several gay club owners have since been arrested for violating various "anti-extremist" provisions of the Russian Criminal Code, with at least one dying in custody as of April 2025. Karèn Shainyan, a prominent LGBTQ rights activist was added to the "terrorist and extremist" list in July 2023, despite not being affiliated with any particular LGBTQ advocacy group. He had been designated as such 4 months before the Ministry of Justice filed a corresponding lawsuit. He was eventually sentenced to 5 years in prison in absentia. Individuals have also been fined or jailed for displaying the rainbow flag or items decorated with its colors (including in one case, earrings), as the ruling designated the rainbow flag to be the symbol of the international LGBT movement. The tightening of anti-LGBTQ laws made queer identity increasingly political in Russia: personal or civic activities, such as posting openly about one’s homosexuality, could be treated as opposition to state policy.

Between March and May 2026, Russian city courts outlawed nine LGBTQ organisations as extremist per the ruling (including the convictions of their founders for leading an extremist organisation), such as Centre T, Coming Out, LGBT Resource Centre, Irida, Kallisto movement, Moscow Community Center for LGBT+ Initiatives, Parni Plus, Russian LGBT Network, and T9 NSK.

== Public opinion ==
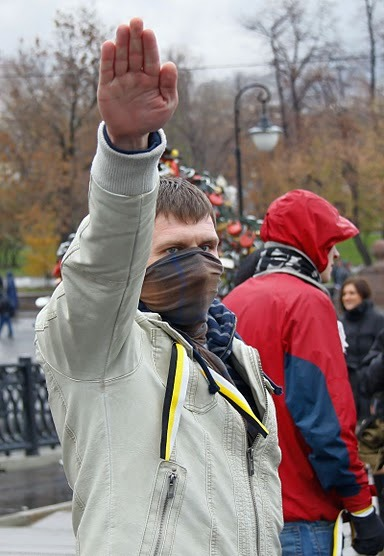
A participant in a rally against gay parades in Moscow raises his hand in a Nazi salute (30 October 2010)

Russia has traditionally been socially conservative on LGBTQ rights, with 2013 polls indicating a large majority of Russians oppose legal recognition of same-sex marriage, and support for laws restricting the distribution of "propaganda" that promotes non-traditional sexual relationships.

In May 2019, a Levada Center survey showed that 47% of Russian respondents agreed that "gays and lesbians should enjoy the same rights as other citizens," while 43 percent disagreed, a rise from 39% in 2013. It is noted that this figure has become the highest since 2005, when 51% of respondents spoke in favor of equal rights. However, despite the increased tolerance, 56% of respondents responded that their attitude towards homosexuals was negative. Another survey conducted in September 2021 revealed a decrease in the number of Russians who support equal rights for gays and lesbians to 33%, while 59% disagreed.

In 2019, a poll showed that only 2% would show interest and a willingness to communicate if the neighbour was a homosexual couple or a member of a religious sect, the last of the category of people presented.

A 2022 survey found that 74% of Russians said homosexuality should not be accepted by society (up from 60% in 2002), compared to 14% who said that homosexuality should be accepted by society. In a 2015 survey of 2,471 Russians, 86% said homosexuality should not be accepted by society. In a 2007 survey, 68% of Russians said homosexuality is always wrong (54%) or almost always wrong (14%). In a 2005 poll, 44% of Russians were in favour of making homosexual acts between consenting adults a criminal act; at the same time, 43% of Russians supported a legal ban on discrimination on the basis of sexual orientation. In 2013, 16% of Russians surveyed said that gay people should be isolated from society, 22% said they should be forced to undergo treatment, and 5% said homosexuals should be "liquidated". In Russian psychiatry, Soviet mentality about homosexuality has endured into the present day. For instance, in spite of the removal of homosexuality from the nomenclature of mental disorders, 62.5% of 450 surveyed psychiatrists in the Rostov Oblast view it as an illness, and up to three-quarters view it as immoral behavior. The psychiatrists sustain the objections to pride parades and the use of veiled schemes to lay off openly lesbian and gay persons from schools, child care centres, and other public institutions. A Russian motorcycle club called the Night Wolves, which is closely associated with Russian President Vladimir Putin and officially suggests "Death to faggots" as an alternate name for itself, organised a large Anti-Maidan rally in February 2015 at which a popular slogan was "We don't need Western ideology and gay parades!"

== Employment discrimination ==
Anton Krasovsky, a television news anchor at government-run KontrTV, was immediately fired from his job in January 2013 when he announced during a live broadcast that he was gay and was disgusted by the national anti-gay propaganda legislation that had been proposed, although had not yet passed.

In September 2013, a Khabarovsk teacher and gay rights activist, Alexander Yermoshkin, was fired from his two jobs as school teacher and university researcher. A week earlier, he had been attacked by members of a local neo-Nazi group "Shtolz Khabarovsk". An activist group called "Movement against the propaganda of sexual perversions" had campaigned for his dismissal.

== Viewpoints of political parties ==
The federal law banning LGBTQ propaganda among minors was passed unanimously by the Russian Duma; as the bill amended an existing child protection law, it is difficult to know whether or not all of the MPs, and their respective political parties, supported every aspect of the bill or not. A few political parties without members in the Duma have expressed some limited support for LGBTQ rights.

Yabloko is a member of the Liberal International, and has organised public demonstrations against intolerance under the banner of building a "Russia without pogroms".

The Libertarian Party of Russia, formed in 2007, has objected to the government ban on "gay propaganda" as a violation of people's right to freedom of speech.

In 2016, two openly gay men ran for seats in the Russian duma. While they admit that they probably will not win a seat, they were supported by a liberal coalition. They are also probably the first openly gay candidates to run for seats in the Russian parliament.

The LGBTQ rights organisation Gayrussia.ru has been monitoring homophobic political parties since 2011. In the middle of 2013 their list included: United Russia, Communist Party of Russian Federation, Narodnaya Volya, National Bolshevik Party, National Bolshevik Front, Patriots of Russia, Eurasian Youth Union and Fair Russia.

President Vladimir Putin has used the existence of transgender rights in other countries as justification for the potential deployment of nuclear weapons against Ukraine. In a speech given on September 30, 2022, Putin said "Do we want things that lead to degradation and extinction to be imposed on children from elementary school? Do we want them to be taught that instead of men and women, there are supposedly some other genders and to be offered sex-change surgeries? This is unacceptable to us." before following up by stating that Russia would be willing to use "all means at our disposal" against Ukraine, and saying that the United States "created a precedent" when it used nuclear weapons against Japan in 1945, mirroring comments by other Russian officials that nuclear weapons were on the table.

== Hate crimes ==
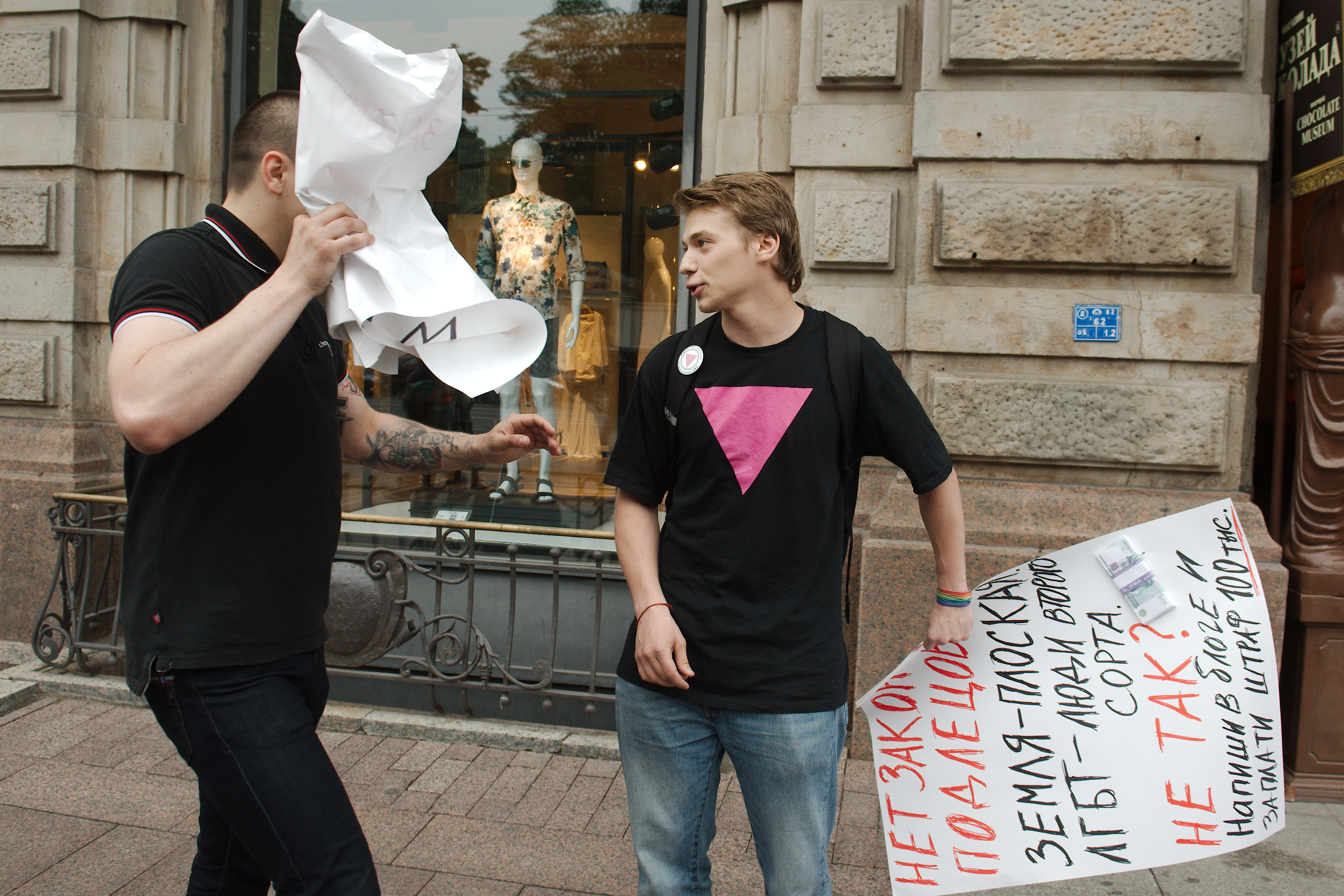
An attack on an activist of the Heterosexual Alliance for LGBT Equality during a protest against the adoption of the law on "propaganda of homosexuality"

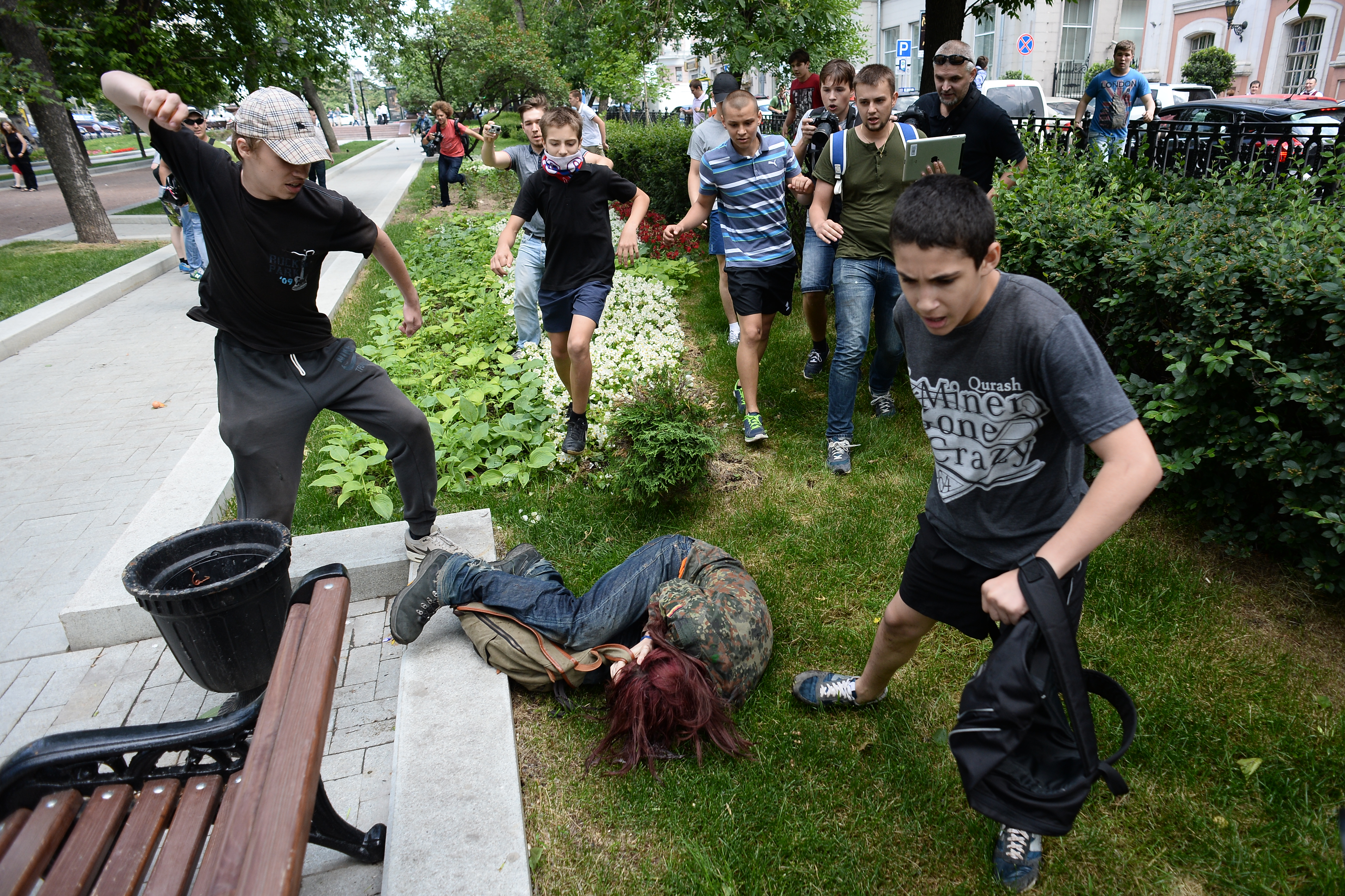
An LGBTQ rights activist is beaten following the "Kissing Day" protest against the State Duma's adoption of the "homosexual propaganda" law

The Russian government does not officially record hate crimes against the LGBTQ community, perpetuating a narrative that such individuals do not exist. In the 2010s, hate crimes against LGBTQ people increased significantly, such as violent attacks, murders, threats, destruction of property, and robberies among others. It was estimated that there were a total of 1,056 hate crimes committed against 853 individuals between 2010 and 2020, with 365 fatalities. The number of annual crimes tripled between 2010 (46) and 2015 (138), with these levels remaining higher throughout the decade.

Hate crimes increased in intensity following the passage of the propaganda law in 2013, and there was an increase in premeditated crimes (often organized by a group of perpetrators) for three years in a row between 2017 and 2019. In most of these cases, hate groups used dating apps and websites in order to "hunt" homosexuals. Those attacks would oftentimes include physical abuse and harassment, and videos of the attacks are often shared on the Internet.

These crimes are perpetuated primarily by hate groups (sometimes with implicit support from authorities) rather than individuals, which have viewed the elimination of LGBTQ people as a means of restoring societal order. One of the most prevalent hate groups was Occupy Pedophilia (named in conflation of homosexuality with pedophilia) became very active in the aftermath of "the gay propaganda law". Launched by Maxim "Tesak" Martsinkevich, a.k.a. Tesak, at the peak of its activity it was present in 40 regions of Russia. The ideology of this hate group was described in Tesak's book Restruct (2012), where he specifically addresses homosexuality, stating that it "cannot be cured" and therefore needs to be exterminated:

Restrukt [Tesak's follower] is heterosexual. In all his actions, he relies on the laws of nature, therefore he does not allow any tolerance for homosexuals. He hates them, like all other vices. However, this one, unlike some of the others, cannot be cured. There might be former smokers and former alcoholics, but there cannot be former faggots

Between 2010 and 2020 the research identified 205 cases of hate crimes committed by various homophobic hate groups, which increased in number from two in 2010, to 38 in 2014. Many of those crimes are committed by Tesak, his followers or copycat movements.

=== Notable cases ===
The crimes committed by the numerous hate groups follow the same scenario.

The presumed paedophile is subjected to a filmed interrogation in which the microphone is replaced by a dildo or a toilet brush. Tesak asks him to identify himself, to hold his passport up to the screen, to indicate his address, to say whether or not he is married and if he has children. After the naming and shaming stage, the questions are then aimed at making the presumed paedophile admit his intentions in going to the date and, more generally, his sexual preferences: 'are you a paedophile or a paederast?' […] "Congratulations, you have just completely ruined your life", jokes Tesak while filming another of his prey lying motionless in his bathtub and being subjected to this pretence of an investigation. The presumed paedophile must often call close people in his life – his wife, children, brother or employer – and has to confess his guilt in front of the camera. His head is sometimes shaved or his hair dyed green. Homophobic and defamatory inscriptions are written on his forehead ('Fuck LGBT', or a rainbow flag). He is made to simulate fellatio with a dildo, and to prance around and sing silly songs. Sometimes he is filmed without any clothes on. He is slapped, shouted at and roughed up. The punishment known as 'urotherapy' is a common practice in all of Occupy Paedophilia's videos and a hallmark of neo-Nazi vigilantes. It involves throwing urine in the prey's face or making them drink it.

On 20 January 2013, six demonstrating LGBTQ activists in the provincial capital of Voronezh were attacked by over 500 people. The protest by these agitators, who appeared with Hitler salutes and hate slogans and threw snowballs, bottles and other objects at the demonstrators and then beat them up, was not registered. The police assigned 10 officers to this event. The employees of the nearby Adidas sports shop staged its mannequins with Hitler salutes in solidarity with the beating. At least three LGBTQ activists, including women, were injured and hospitalized during the resistance. On the same day, the author of the Petersburg law against 'homosexual propaganda', Vitaly Milonov, posted on his Twitter that "Voronezh is great".

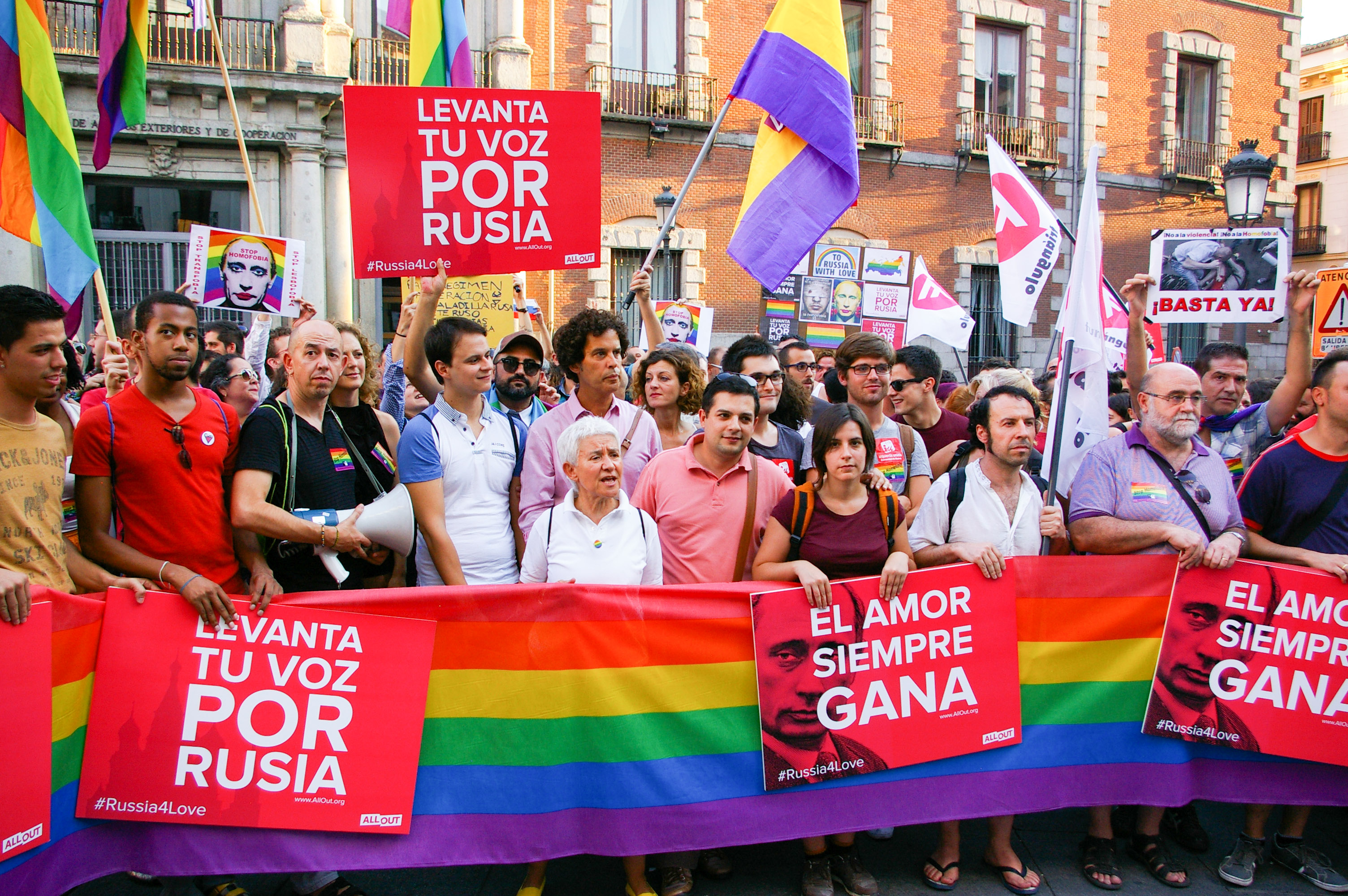
Activists protesting outside Spain's Ministry of Foreign Affairs against institutionalized homophobia in Russia. (2006)

Unlike in many western nations, LGBTQ persons in Russia are not protected by specific legal protections. Violent criminal acts carried out against LGBTQ people are prosecuted as criminal offences under Russian law, but the fact that these crimes are motivated by the sexual orientation or gender identity of the victim is not considered an aggravating factor when the court determines the sentence. Among the more vicious crimes that would qualify as hate crimes outside of Russia and are reported in the press would include the following;

- On 9 May 2013, after Victory Day parades in Volgograd, the body of a 23-year-old man was found tortured and murdered by three males who stated anti-homosexual motivations, even though family and friends state the victim had no behavior inclination.
- On 29 May 2013, the body of 38-year-old deputy director of Kamchatka airport Oleg Serdyuk (rus: Олег Сердюк) was found in his burned-out car, having been beaten and stabbed the previous day. Local authorities said the murder was motivated by homophobia. Three suspects (who were local residents) were tried and sentenced to prison terms of 9 to 12 years.
- From October 2013 – February 2014, anti-gay attacks targeting the LGBTQ community in Moscow were reported at Russia's largest gay nightclub Central Station, including gunfire and gas attacks. Several attacks and victim responses were documented in an ABC News Nightline special "Moscow is Burning". Several employees of the club subsequently left the country.

== Transgender issues ==
In Tsarist Russia, young women would sometimes pose as men or act like tomboys. This was often tolerated among the educated middle classes, with the assumption that such behaviour was asexual and would stop when the girl married. However, cross-dressing was widely seen as sexually immoral behavior, punishable by God promoted through the Church and later criminalized by the government.

In Soviet Russia, sex reassignment surgeries were first tried during the 1920s but became prohibited until the 1960s. Later they were performed by Irina Golubeva, an endocrinologist, authorised by psychiatrist Aron Belkin, who was the strongest Soviet advocate for transgender people until his death in 2003.

On 29 December 2014, Russia passed a road safety law, allowing the government to deny driver's licences to people with several classes of mental disorders according to ICD-10. Class "F60-69 Disorders of adult personality and behaviour" includes "F64 Transsexualism" Russian and foreign critics perceived the law as a ban on transgender drivers: journalist Yelena Masyuk questioned the relevance of a person's transgender identity in regards to their ability to drive. On 14 January 2015, Russia's Health Ministry clarified the law, stating that it would only deny licenses to those with disorders that would impair their ability to drive safely, and explicitly stated that one's sexual orientation would not be considered a factor under the law, as it is not considered a psychiatric disorder.

In 2018, the Ministry of Health of the Russian Federation developed a draft medical certificate that will help transgender people with confirming their gender identity on their legal documents. The Ministry of Justice approved this document on January 19, 2018. Up to this point, changes related to the gender change could only be made to the documents on the basis of a court decision. The Ministry of Health explained that, in accordance with the legislation, the registry offices make changes to the birth certificate if a mentioned certificate is submitted.

A certificate of gender change is required to change person's gender in documents such as a birth certificate and passport, and can be obtained on the basis of a medical commission consisting of a psychiatrist, a sexologist and a medical psychologist. Neither sex-affirmative surgery nor hormone replacement therapy are required. The minimum duration of psychiatric observation is not specified in the final document of the Ministry of Health. On average, the commission lasts from 2 days to 1 month.

On 31 May 2023, a bill to legally ban individuals having any sex change and reassignments within Russia, annulling marriages with partners that have changed gender and banning said individuals from adopting children was introduced in the State Duma. State Duma Speaker Vyacheslav Volodin said the number of gender reassignment surgeries in the US has increased by 50 times over the past 10 years, and around 1.4% of all US teenagers aged between 13 and 17 identified themselves as transgender in 2022. He said "This is the path leading to the degradation of a nation", stating that the newly adopted law was designed to avoid such a scenario.

On 19 July, the bill unanimously passed its three required readings in the State Duma. On 19 July, the upper house of parliament unanimously approved the bill, and it was signed into law by President Putin on 24 July. Under the legislation:

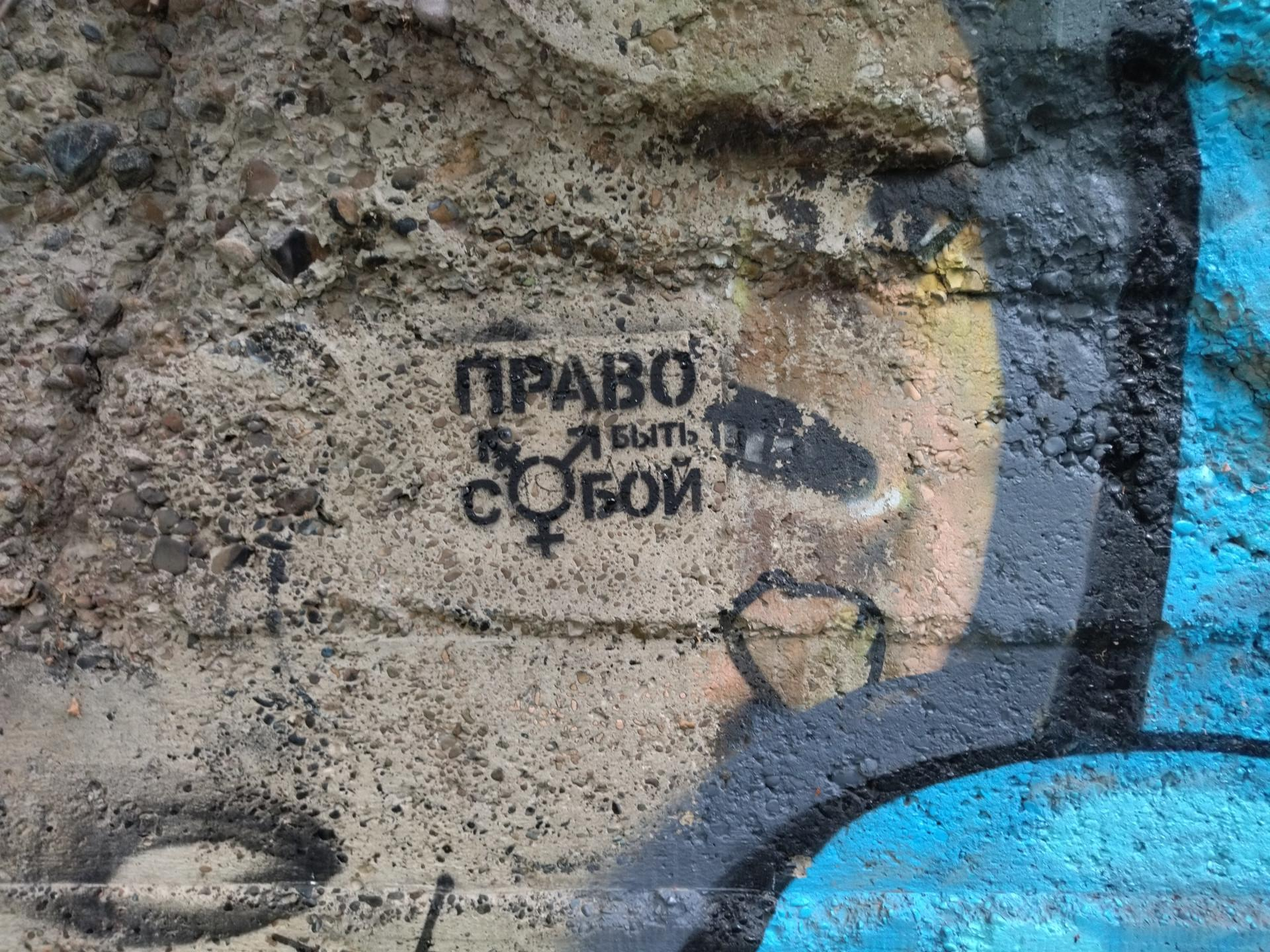
Stencil graffiti "Право быть собой" (The right to be myself), advocating against the gender transition ban. June 2023, Tomsk, Russia

- doctors are prevented from offering gender-affirming healthcare and sexual reassignment surgery to any individual, regardless of age.
- changing gender markers on official documents is not allowed.
- people suffering from gender dysphoria have been deprived of the right to adopt children.
- a marriage by a trans individual with a person who shares the same birth sex as them is deemed null.

In January 2024, Meduza reported that Russia's MVD had begun bringing transgender people in for questioning. According to one transgender subject, he was questioned about where he got the medical certificate approving his transition, how much it cost, who was on the committee to approve it, and if he had attended any LGBTQ parties. After answering that he didn't remember the answer to the last question, he was told that they would keep bringing him in until he did. He was also told that if his approval certificate turned out to be invalid, that he would be forcibly detransitioned.

== Propaganda bans ==
Displayed in are countries where homosexuality is not illegal, but where freedom of expression and association is censored or prohibited. are countries where such laws result in arrest or detention. Russia is listed in this category, alongside Indonesia.

=== Regional laws ===
Ten Russian regions passed laws banning the distribution of "propaganda" relating to homosexuality, and/or other LGBTQ relationships, to minors. Ban on the promotion of homosexuality, bisexuality and transidentity Ban on the promotion of homosexuality and bisexuality Ban on the promotion of homosexuality

Between 2006 and 2013, ten regions enacted a ban on "propaganda of homosexualism" among minors. The laws of nine of them prescribe punishments of administrative sanctions and/or fines. The laws in some of the regions also forbid so-called "propaganda of bisexualism and transgenderism" to minors. As of May 2013 the regions that had enacted these various laws, and the years in which they had passed the laws, included: Ryazan Oblast (2006), Arkhangelsk Oblast (2011), Saint Petersburg (2012), Kostroma Oblast (2012), Magadan Oblast (2012), Novosibirsk Oblast (2012), Krasnodar Krai (2012), Samara Oblast (2012), Bashkortostan (2012), (Note: Bashkortostan is the only region where the law does not include any kind of administrative sanctions or fines.) and Kaliningrad Oblast (February 2013). (Note: Kaliningrad Oblast's measure bans "propaganda of homosexualism" not only among minors, but among the population in general.) Then, Arkhangelsk (2013) and Saint Petersburg (2014) removed the law.

In 2019, Russia cut and censored gay sex scenes in the movie musical Rocketman based on the life of British singer Elton John, a decision he criticised, saying it is "cruelly unaccepting of the love between two people."

=== National laws ===
Federal laws passed on 29 June 2013 ban the distribution of "propaganda of non-traditional sexual relationships" among minors. Critics contend the law makes illegal holding any sort of public demonstration in favour of gay rights, speak in defence of LGBT rights, and distribute material related to LGBT culture, or to state that same-sex relationships are equal to heterosexual relationships. Additionally the laws have received international condemnation from human rights campaigners, and media outlets that even display of LGBT symbols, such as the rainbow flag, have resulted in arrests, and incited homophobic violence.

The law subjects Russian citizens found guilty to fines of up to 5,000 roubles and public officials to fines of up to 50,000 roubles. Organisations or businesses will be fined up to 1 million rubles and be forced to cease operations for up to 90 days. Foreigners may be arrested and detained for up to 15 days then deported, as well as fined up to 100,000 rubles. Russian citizens who have used the Internet or media to promote "non-traditional relations" will be fined up to 100,000 rubles.

The statute amended a law that is said to protect children from pornography and other "harmful information". One of the authors of the statute, Yelena Mizulina, who is the chair of the Duma's Committee on Family, Women, and Children and who has been described by some as a moral crusader, told lawmakers as the bill was being considered, "Traditional sexual relations are relations between a man and a woman.... These relations need special protection". Mizulina argued that a recent poll had shown 88% of the public were in support of the bill.

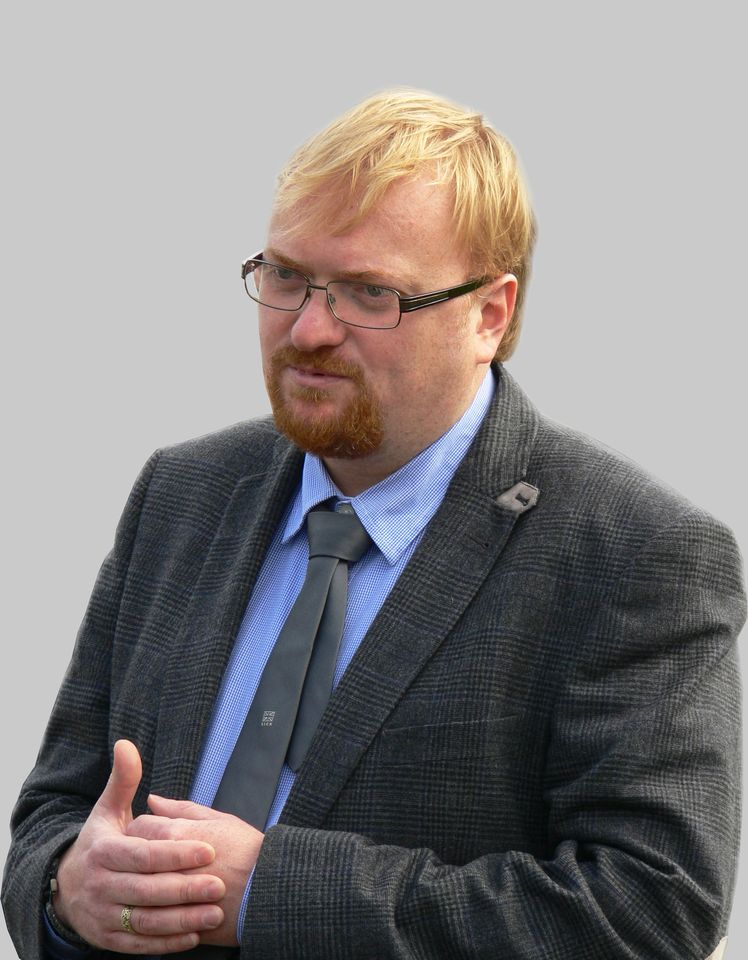
Member of the Legislative Assembly of Saint Petersburg, Vitaly Milonov. Milonov is interviewed in the 2014 American documentary film Campaign of Hate: Russia and Gay Propaganda.

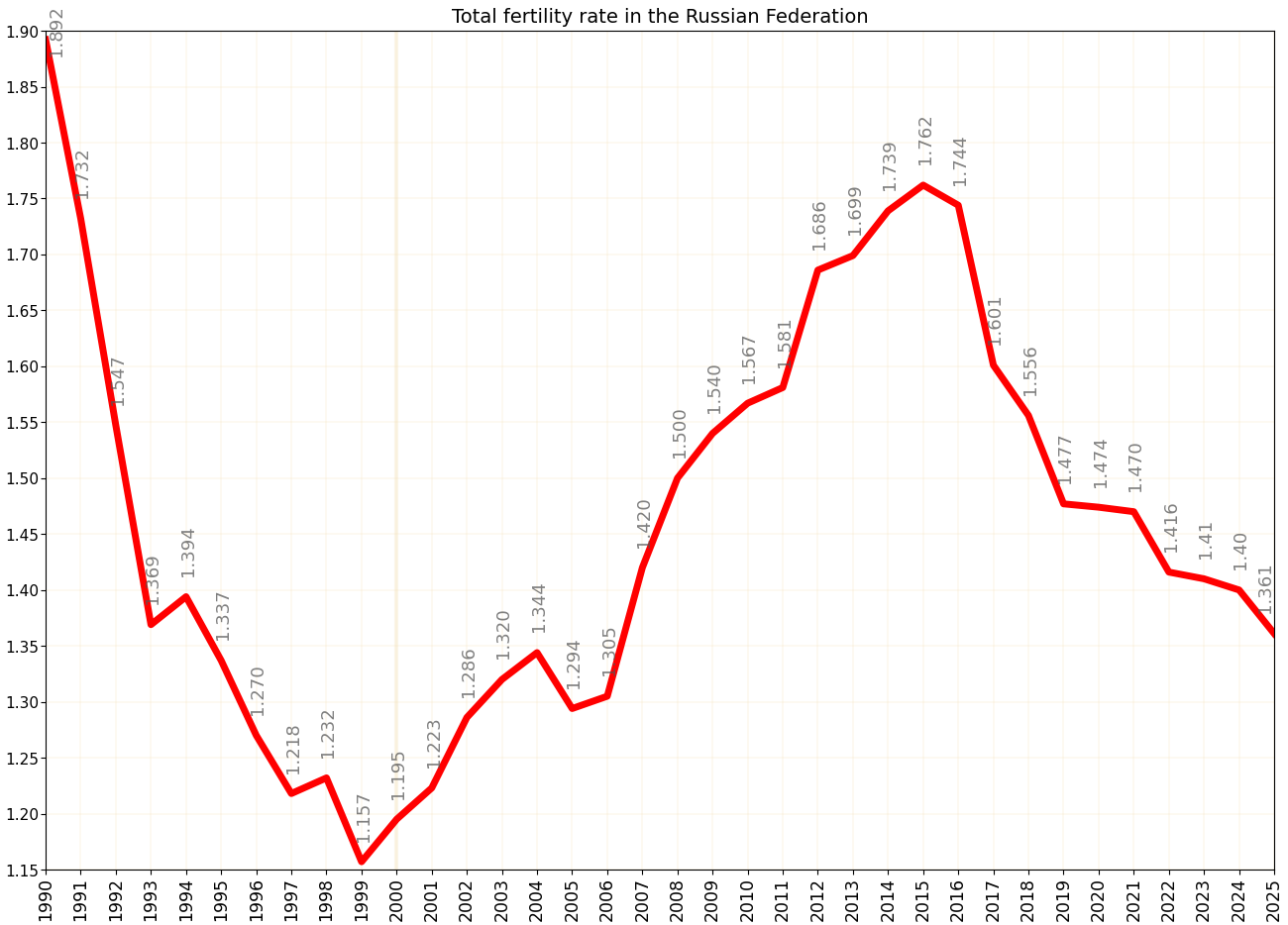
One of the purported main goals of the anti-LGBT laws in Russia was to increase the birth rate. However, the birth rate in Russia continues to fall.

Commenting on the bill prior to its passage, President Putin said, during a visit to Amsterdam in April 2013, "I want everyone to understand that in Russia there are no infringements on sexual minorities' rights. They're people, just like everyone else, and they enjoy full rights and freedoms". He went on to say that he fully intended to sign the bill because the Russian people demanded it. As he put it, "Can you imagine an organization promoting pedophilia in Russia? I think people in many Russian regions would have started to take up arms.... The same is true for sexual minorities: I can hardly imagine same-sex marriages being allowed in Chechnya. Can you imagine it? It would have resulted in human casualties." Putin also mentioned that he was concerned about Russia's low birth-rate and that same-sex relationships do not produce children.

Critics say that the statute is written so broadly that it is in effect a complete ban on the gay rights movement and any public expression of LGBT culture.

In July 2013, four Dutch tourists were arrested for allegedly discussing gay rights with Russian youths. The four were arrested for allegedly spreading "propaganda of nontraditional relationships among the under-aged" after talking to teens at a camp in the northern city of Murmansk.

After the law was passed, enforcement started slowly, with only a few cases each year, mainly against individuals sharing pro-LGBTQ messages or images. By the late 2010s, the number of cases grew, and authorities began targeting not just activists but also journalists, websites, and businesses for content such as rainbow imagery, interviews with LGBTQ people, or LGBTQ-themed products. Fines were issued for posting same-sex couple photos or expressing pride in LGBTQ identity. In one 2023 case, a woman was fined over $10,000 for sharing scenes from a film and music video that showed same-sex romance.

In March 2018 the Russian authorities forbade the biggest gay website Gay.ru because of "propaganda of nontraditional sexual relationships". The law was ruled to be inconsistent with protection of freedom of expression by the European Court of Human Rights, but as of 2021 has not been repealed.

In December 2022, an amendment to the propaganda law was signed into law by Putin, extending it to all age groups. It also prohibits the distribution of materials that promote "pedophilia", or give minors a "desire to change their sex". Enforcement of the law was also subsequently increased. In 2023 alone, there were more than 180 cases, a number greater than all the cases from 2013 to 2022 combined. Fines that year totaled around 26 million rubles, compared to the 7 million rubles issued over the previous nine years. Media platforms, streaming services, and social networks were fined for showing LGBTQ content; some were ordered to pay hundreds of thousands of rubles. Individual citizens also received harsher penalties.

In February 2023, the Russian government introduced the AI program Oculus to scan the internet for illegal content, including "LGBT propaganda."

On 23 November 2024 Vladimir Putin signed an amendment to the Family Code of Russia that banned both citizens and permanent residents of countries where gender transitioning is legal from adopting children. Since 1 January 2013 all American citizens are prohibited from adopting Russian children, as per so-called "Dima Yakovlev Law".

==== Domestic reactions ====
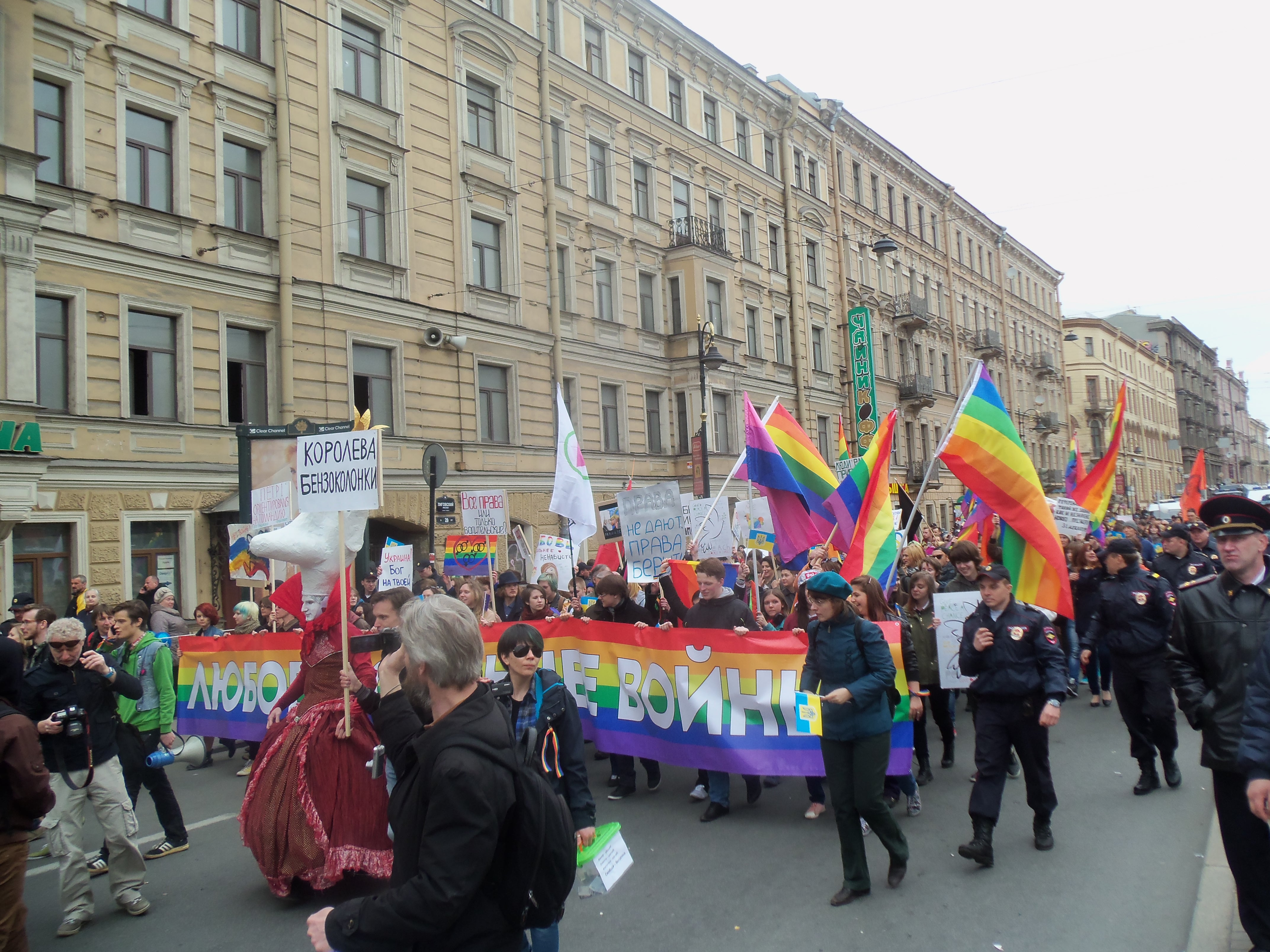
Saint Petersburg protest march, 1 May 2014

According to a survey conducted in June 2013 by the Russian Public Opinion Research Center (VTsIOM), at least 90% of those surveyed were in favor of the law.

Russian historian and human rights activist Lyudmila Alexeyeva has called it "a step toward the Middle Ages".

In January 2016, the State Duma rejected a proposal by the Communist Party to punish people who publicly express their homosexuality with fines and arrests.

==== International reactions and boycott ====
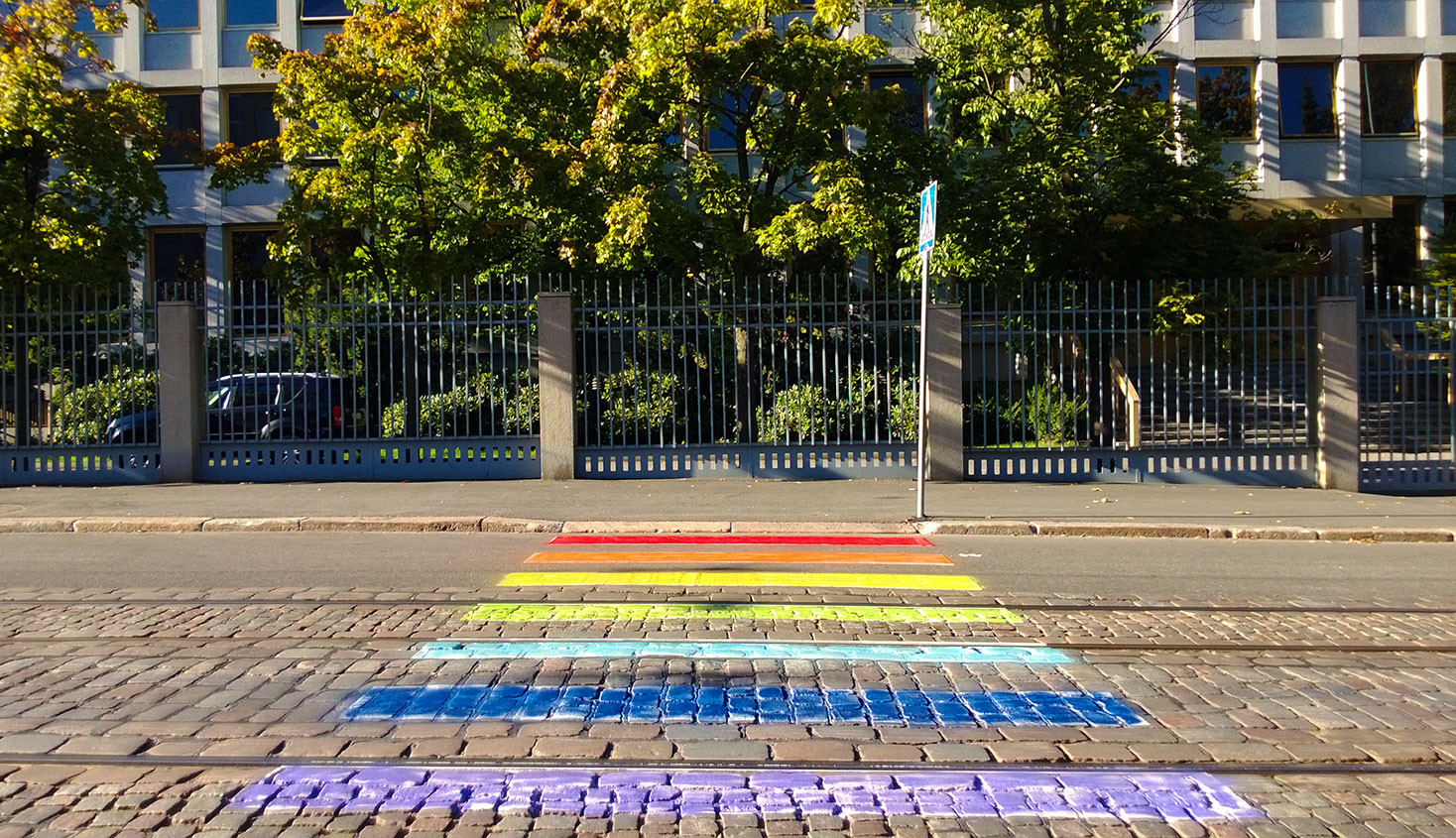
In June 2013, a new law was passed in Russia which banned the distribution of "propaganda of non-traditional sexual relationships" towards minors. In response to this new law, in August and September 2013 the Russian embassies in Stockholm, Oslo and Helsinki all had rainbow crossings painted on the road outside of the embassy buildings by activists. Above is a photo of the Rainbow crossing outside of the Russian embassy in Helsinki.

International human rights organisations and the governments of developed democracies around the world have strongly condemned this Russian law. The Office of the United Nations High Commissioner for Human Rights has condemned this Russian statute and another similar one in Moldova (which was later repealed) as discriminatory and has made clear that the Russian statute in question is a violation of international human rights law, including the right of gay children to receive proper information. The European Parliament has condemned Russia for homophobic discrimination and censorship and the Council of Europe has called on Russia to protect LGBTQ rights properly. The European Court of Human Rights had previously fined Russia for other infringements of LGBTQ rights. In 2012 the UN Human Rights Committee ruled that a similar statute in the Russia's Ryazan Region was discriminatory, infringed on freedom of expression, and was inadmissible under international law – a Russian court in Ryazan later agreed and struck it down. Some members of the gay community commenced a boycott of Russian goods, particularly Russian vodka.

Many Western celebrities and activists are openly opposed to the law and have encouraged a boycott of Russian products – notably Russian vodka – as well as a boycott of the 2014 Winter Olympic Games, which were scheduled to be held in Sochi, unless the Games were relocated out of Russia.

In August and September 2013 the Russian embassies in Stockholm, Oslo and Helsinki all had Rainbow crossings painted on the road outside of the embassy buildings by activists in response to the new law that was passed in June 2013 in Russia which banned the distribution of "propaganda of non-traditional sexual relationships" towards minors. In all three cities the Russian embassy buildings already had zebra crosings on the road outside of the buildings and the activists painted over the top of them in rainbow colours. In Helsinki the activists returned the night after they had painted the zebra crossing and staged a kiss-in in front of the Russian embassy. In Stockholm the activists returned to the rainbow crossing and walked naked across it whilst they were having their photo taken by other activists and they also stood outside the embassy wearing only underwear and dressed up in drag. One of these activists in Stockholm who was wearing only a tight fitting pair of shiny blue underwear also pole danced upside down on a street sign pole outside of the embassy.

===== Political figures =====
Then-U.S. president Barack Obama said that while he did not favour boycotting the Sochi Olympics over the law, "Nobody's more offended than me about some of the anti-gay and lesbian legislation that you've been seeing in Russia". Obama subsequently, in September 2013, met with Russian gay rights activists during a visit to St. Petersburg to attend a meeting of the G-20 nations' leaders. Obama said that he was proud of the work the activists were doing. His aides had said that Obama's opposition to the anti-gay propaganda law was one reason Obama had canceled a meeting previously planned to have been held with President Putin during the trip.

The law was also condemned by then-German chancellor Angela Merkel and German cabinet secretaries, then-British prime minister David Cameron, then-Australian foreign minister Bob Carr, as well as then-Canadian prime minister Stephen Harper and foreign affairs Minister John Baird.

== Summary table ==
	Notes
Same-sex sexual activity legal	Yes Legal since 1993 for men, never criminalised for women. No De facto illegal in Chechnya, often punished with life in prison, torture, vigilante execution, vigilante attacks and forced labor camp internment.
Equal age of consent (16)	Yes (since 2003) (Note: The age of consent for homosexual acts was never specifically mentioned in the old Criminal Code of RSFSR, which was replaced with the new Criminal Code of Russia in 1996, and this new Code mentions the age of consent regardless of sexual orientation (although harsher penalties apply in case of an illicit same-sexual intercourse with a person younger than 16) in Article 134.)
Freedom of expression	No (Federal ban on distribution of "propaganda" for "non-traditional" relationships and "sex change" to minors since 2013 and to adults since 2022; Public expression of LGBTQ identity banned since 2023)
Anti-discrimination laws in employment	No
Anti-discrimination laws in the provision of goods and services	No
Anti-discrimination laws in education	No
Anti-bullying laws in public and private schools
Anti-discrimination laws in all other areas (including indirect discrimination)	No
Anti-torture law including sexual orientation and gender identity	No
Hate crime laws include sexual orientation and gender identity	No
Hate speech based on sexual orientation and gender identity prohibited	No
Same-sex marriage(s)	No (Explicit constitutional ban since 2020)
Recognition of same-sex couples	No
Recognition of same-sex marriages performed elsewhere	No
Adoption by a single LGBTQ person	No
Foster care by same-sex couples	No
Stepchild adoption by same-sex couples	No
Joint adoption by same-sex couples	No
Conversion therapy banned on minors	No
LGB people are not legally restricted from serving openly in the military	No
Homosexuality declassified as an illness	No (not classified as an illness from 1999 to 2022; new laws introduced on 1 July 2023)
Right to change legal gender	No (Banned since 2023)
Intersex minors protected from invasive surgical procedures	No
Altruistic surrogacy for gay male couples	No
Access to IVF for lesbians	No
Automatic parenthood for both spouses after birth	No
MSM allowed to donate blood	Yes (Since 2008)
Recognition of sexual orientation and gender identity for asylum requests	No

== See also ==
- Human rights in Russia
- LGBT rights in Asia
- LGBT rights in Europe
- LGBT culture in Russia
- LGBT history in Russia
- LGBT rights in Chechnya
- LGBT Human Rights Project Gayrussia.ru
- List of LGBT books banned in Russia
- Moscow Helsinki Watch Group
- Nikolay Alexeyev
- Recognition of same-sex unions in Russia
- Think of the children
- Vitaly Milonov
- Russian LGBT Network

== Sources ==
This article incorporates text from a free content work. Licensed under CC-BY-SA IGO 3.0 (license statement/permission). Text taken from Out in the Open: Education sector responses to violence based on sexual orientation and gender identity/expression, 45, UNESCO, UNESCO. UNESCO.

- Duberman, Martin; Vicinus, Martha; Chauncey, George (1989). Hidden from history: reclaiming the gay and lesbian past. New York: New American Library. ISBN 978-0-453-00689-7. OCLC 19669484.
- Engelstein, Laura (1995). "Soviet Policy Toward Male Homosexuality: Its Origins and Historical Roots". Journal of Homosexuality. 29 (2–3). Philadelphia: Hayworth Press: 155–178. doi:10.1300/J082v29n02_06. ISSN 1540-3602. PMID 8666753.
- Petrov, Igor; Kirichenko, Ksenia (5 April 2009). "Discrimination based on sexual orientation and gender identity in Russia". Report by the [http://www.mhg.ru/english Moscow Helsinki Group] in cooperation with the [http://lgbtnet.ru/ Russian LGBT Network]. Archived from the original on 1 June 2011.
