= Jurk =

Jurk may refer to:

== People ==
- Thomas Jurk (born 1962), German politician
- Ulrike Jurk (born 1979), German volleyball player

== Other uses ==
- De jurk or The Dress, a 1996 Dutch comedy film
- Legal Aid for Women (Norwegian: Juridisk rådgivning for kvinner (JURK)), a Norwegian NGO

== See also ==
- Jerk (disambiguation)
