= Closer (Dennis Cooper novel) =

1989 novel by Dennis Cooper

- First edition cover
- Author: Dennis Cooper
- Language: English
- Genre: Novel
- Publisher: Grove Press
- Publication date: 1989
- Publication place: United States
- Media type: Print
- Followed by: Frisk

Closer is the debut novel of American writer Dennis Cooper, published in 1989 by Grove Press. It is considered one of the author's most famous works. The plot revolves around George Miles, a passive, drug-using gay teenager who becomes an object of desire for several boys seeking escape from the monotony of their lives through sex and violence.

The novel explores themes such as male objectification, sexuality, violence, child abuse, and death. Regarding his approach to these themes, Cooper stated in 1989 that his intention was neither to arouse nor shock readers, but rather to "disturb" them.

The novel is the first installment in the George Miles Cycle, a collection of works inspired by a childhood friend of Cooper's who later became his boyfriend and that is characterized by the eroticization of death and sexual violence. Because of that, several elements introduced in Closer are later explored in the other novels of the cycle, albeit from different perspectives. George Miles himself reappears as a character in the other works, though his identity changes in each one.

== Plot summary ==
George is a teenager to whom many of the people around him are strongly attracted, and who, due to his passive personality and constant drug use, lets everyone do whatever they want to him. Among his lovers is John, a punk artist who enjoys distorting figures in his paintings and with whom George has a threesome that ends in a violent act. Other characters attracted to George include David, a teenager whose good looks lead him to believe he's famous, and Mr. McGough, the school's creative writing teacher.

Following a rejection, George meets Phillipe, an older man who introduces him to coprophilia during their sexual encounters, which are also documented by a pornography-obsessed boy named Alex. George's mother dies of terminal cancer, which leads him to visit Tom, an older man Phillipe had introduced him to who is obsessed with violent practices. In the midst of this encounter, Tom anesthetizes George and begins slashing his buttocks, though he later lets him go without killing him. After recovering from his injuries, George meets Steve, a young man who had opened an underground nightclub and who resolves to protect George thereafter.

== Main characters ==
- George Miles: He is the protagonist of the story. Like other characters in the novel, he constructs an inner world to escape the boredom of the real world. In his case, Disneyland represents the idea of perfection, a place where all interactions and feelings can be exciting.
- Cliff: He is a boy who views the events around him as though he were directing or acting in a film. He is the only one of George's friends who shows genuine affection for him, although he feels unable to tell him that he loves him. In the novel, the character represents Cooper himself.

== Structure ==
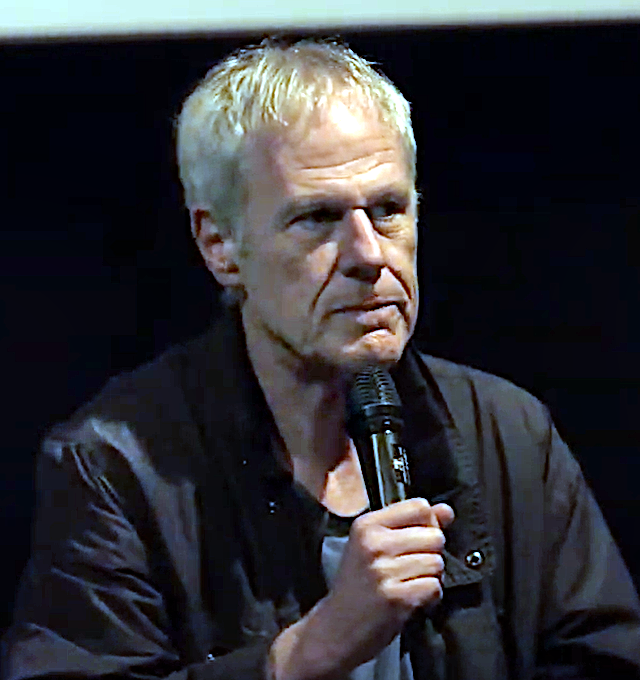
Dennis Cooper in 2020.

The novel follows a rigorous structure in which all paragraphs have the same length. Cooper chose this structure, as he stated in an interview, to "give a bit of beauty and rigor" to the world of the characters. Each chapter of the work also focuses on one of the characters and is titled with their names.

The title of the book was chosen by Cooper to express the idea of complexity and movement towards a particular kind of closeness that would leave the person in a kind of limbo.

== Reception ==
The novel won the first edition of the Ferro-Grumley Award to the best male LGBT fiction book in 1990. It was also shortlisted for the second edition of the Lambda Literary Award for Gay Fiction.

Among the reviews published upon its release was that of Kirkus Reviews, which described the novel as "part gallows humor, part pornographic excess, part mad-slasher suspense-and definitely not for the squeamish", as well as a "frightening vision of urban decay and anarchy in a punk/gay subculture". Writer Lynne Tillman, in a review for the Los Angeles Times, stated that the novel translated "the moments and feelings for which we don’t really have a vocabulary". Publishers Weekly, on the other hand, gave it a negative review, noting that Cooper's approach to sexual anomalies became tiresome and that even memorable moments were lost in his "dolorous prose".

== See also ==
- George Miles Cycle

== Bibliography ==
- Bell, Wade A. (2013). "Dissecting George Miles: Objectification, the Gaze, and Ontological Uncertainty in Dennis Cooper's Closer". Moderna Språk. 107 (2): 20–34. doi:10.58221/mosp.v107i2.8062. ISSN 2000-3560.
- Roberts, Kelly (2023). "Dennis Cooper's Closer and Its Social Discontents". Contemporary Literature. 63 (3): 341–369. doi:10.3368/cl.63.3.341. ISSN 0010-7484.
