= George Miles Cycle =

American series of novels

- Closer (1989); Frisk (1991); Try (1994); Guide (1997); Period (2000)
- Author: Dennis Cooper
- Country: United States
- Language: English
- Published: 1989 – 2000
- Media type: Print (paperback & hardcover); Audiobook; E-book

The George Miles Cycle is a series of five novels published by American author Dennis Cooper between 1989 and 2000. The series is inspired by George Miles, an acquaintance during Cooper's youth, who later became his boyfriend and who had a profound impact on his life. The series is characterized by the eroticization of death and sexual violence as a common theme. Other commonly presented and recurring themes in the novels include the impossibility of performing certain fantasies, drug use, rock bands, murder, and child abuse.

George Miles appears as a character in each of the novels, although he is presented under different identities. In Closer (1989), Miles appears under his own name. In Frisk (1991), he is named Kevin, while in Try (1994), he appears as Ziggy. In Guide (1997), he is represented by Chris, and in Period (2000), he again appears under his own name as George.

Due to its transgressive themes, the series has been compared to the works of other authors such as the Marquis de Sade, Georges Bataille, and William Burroughs. The books have generated controversy, particularly Frisk, for which Cooper received death threats and was accused of homophobia and being anti-gay. However, the book series also bought recognition to Cooper.

== Works ==
The George Miles Cycle consists of five novels:

=== Closer (1989) ===
It is the first book of the cycle and its plot revolves around George Miles, a young man of great physical beauty but of extreme passive attitude, who becomes the object of desire for the boys around him and allows everyone to do whatever they want with him. Among his lovers are John, a punk artist, Alex, who records George's sexual encounters with an older man, or Tom, who once anesthetizes George to perform sadistic acts.

=== Frisk (1991) ===
The second book follows the story of a 13-year-old boy named Dennis who one day sees a series of photographs of a mutilated man, which deeply affects him. Some time later, Dennis begins a romantic relationship with a young man named Julian and develops an obsession with the idea of murdering a man after having sex with him. Dennis later moves to the Netherlands, from where he sends a letter to Julian recounting details about a series of brutal murders which he claims to have committed. Julian decides to go visit him along with his brother Kevin to discover the truth.

=== Try (1994) ===
The book details the life of a teenager named Ziggy who is sexually abused by his adoptive parents and uncle Ken. He later befriends Calhoun, a heroin-addict, with whom he falls in love with. Another narrative arc revolves around the story of Ken and his gruesome sexual acts.

=== Guide (1997) ===
The fourth book tells the story of a novelist named Dennis, who intends to write an article about AIDS. While doing so, he gets acquainted with a group of gay teenagers. Among them is Chris, who is obsessed with his own death, Goof, who overdoses during the recording of a pornographic film, and Sniffles, who likes to be abused.

=== Period (2000) ===
It is the last novel of the series. The plot follows a series of murders committed by a Satanic Gothic band known as Omen. Two boys, Nate and Leon, who are fans of the band, decide to kill in a boy named Dagger in a Satanic sexual ritual.
