= Permanent Green Light =

French film directed by American author Dennis Cooper and Zac Farley

- Poster
- Directed by: Dennis Cooper; Zac Farley
- Produced by: Nicolas Brevière
- Starring: Benjamin Sulpice; Théo Cholbi; Julien Fayeulle; Sylvain Delcoitre; Milo Ricquart
- Cinematography: Michaël Salerno
- Edited by: Avril Besson; Zac Farley; Dennis Cooper
- Production company: Local Films
- Release date: 2018
- Running time: 91 minutes
- Country: France
- Language: French
- Budget: $160,000

Permanent Green Light is a 2018 French film directed by Dennis Cooper and Zac Farley.

== Plot synopsis ==
Roman, a young man from a small French suburb, becomes fixated on the idea of blowing himself up for seemingly no reason other than pure spectacle. The film follows the development of this obsession as well as his friends' different reactions to it. The film uses language in a very deliberate way, intended to add to the ambiance of the film rather than serving a purely utilitarian function.

== Cast ==
- Benjamin Sulpice as Roman
- Théo Cholbi as Tim
- Julien Fayeulle as Ollie
- Sylvain Delcoitre as Guillaume
- Milo Ricquart as Ami de Léon (Léon's friend)
- Rose Mousselet as Léon
- Katia Petrowick as Sœur de Roman (Roman's sister)
- Noé Lubliner as Ado
- François Gallois-Montbrun as Père de Léon (Léon's father)
- Martin Loison as Connaissance de Guillaume (Guillaume's acquaintance)
- Joana Rosnoblet as Fille à l'autel de la rue (Girl at the street altar)

== Production ==
Cooper and Farley had previously collaborated on Like Cattle Towards Glow, an anthology of abstract pornographic short films released in 2015.

The plot was inspired by the actions of Australian teenage suicide bomber Jake Bilardi. Cooper and Farley were intrigued by the seemingly inexplicable nature of his death, as unlike most suicide bombers, Bilardi did not seem to have been politically or ideologically motivated.

Sulpice, an acting student, and Cholbi, who had previously appeared in Larry Clark's 2014 The Smell of Us, were the only two cast members with prior acting experience. This was a deliberate choice on the part of the directors, as they believed non-actors would bring more authenticity to the characters.

The filming took place in Cherbourg, a coastal town in Manche.

== Release ==
Permanent Green Light premiered at the 2018 International Film Festival Rotterdam. It was included in their "Bright Future" program, which highlights "[e]merging talent with original subject matter and an individual style".

The film was screened by Film at Lincoln Center as part of a series titled "Dennis Cooper Carte Blanche" on September 5-6, 2018.

== Reception ==
Permanent Green Light received largely positive critical reception. In an article for The White Review, Shama Khanna praised the film and compared its themes to Robert Bresson's 1977 The Devil, Probably, noting: "The Devil Probably is much less nihilistic than Permanent Green Light, which surrenders to our renewed nuclear threat rather than becoming any sort of martyr to it. Cooper and Farley’s film is an echo-filled love song for a headphone-wearing, screen-dependent generation. Where Bresson’s Charles stubbornly protests that it’s ‘our strength’ which unites us in resistance, Roman obsesses out loud about wanting to become ‘the particularity of the explosion’, which he hopes people will applaud him for."

Daniel Felsenthal also wrote about it positively for the Los Angeles Review of Books, stating that "[Permanent Green Light is] an extraordinarily quiet and thoughtful movie, steeped in the culture and feeling of childhood and adolescence, as well as a highly successful collaboration.[...]The film painstakingly avoids condescending to its adolescent characters: the audience is as incapable of understanding them as they are of understanding themselves."

Jeff Jackson, in a review for Literary Hub, called the film one of the best of the year. He complimented the ambiance and tone set by the film, the dialogue, and actors' ability to convey emotion.

Permanent Green Light was listed as one of John Waters's favorite films of 2018.
