= Kiddiepunk =

- Type: Publisher,
- Industry: Publishing, Film
- Founded: 2002
- Headquarters: Paris, France
- Products: Books, Zines

Kiddiepunk is a Paris-based, independent publisher founded in 2002 by artist and filmmaker Michael Salerno. They specialize in releasing limited edition books and zines, as well as film and video projects.

== Overview ==
Originally based in Melbourne, Australia, Kiddiepunk begun as a zine with the release of "Kiddiepunk #1" in 2002. Since 2011, after relocating to Paris, France, the press has released notable publications including Dennis Cooper's animated GIF novel "Zac's Haunted House", Peter Sotos' and Michael Salerno's book "Home" and four issues of the zine "Teenage Satanists in Oklahoma".

== Publications ==
Publications have included:

- Theme of Sadness by O.B. De Alessi (2011)
- GRAVES by Thomas Moore (2011)
- French Hole, being fifteen outtakes from 'The Marbled Swarm' by Dennis Cooper (2011)
- The Two Eyes Are Not Brothers by Scott Treleaven (2011)
- "The Sky Went Red While He Was Inside" by Ken Baumann (2012)
- Teenage Satanists in Oklahoma by Michael Salerno (2012)
- I Murder So That I May Come Back by O.B. De Alessi (2012)
- A.Y.P.S. by Terence Hannum (2013)
- The Night is an Empire by Thomas Moore (2013)
- Home by Michael Salerno and Peter Sotos (2013)
- Teenage Satanists in Oklahoma 2 by Michael Salerno (2014)
- Skeleton Costumes by Thomas Moore (2014)
- Zac's Haunted House by Dennis Cooper (2015)
- The Goners by Mark Gluth (2015)
- Teenage Satanists in Oklahoma 3 by Michael Salerno (2015)
- Zac's Control Panel by Dennis Cooper (2015)
- Teenage Satanists in Oklahoma 4 by Michael Salerno (2016)
- Novi Sad by Jeff Jackson (2016)
- The Other Lived as Me by Ange Dargent (2023)
- And I Could Not Have Hurt You by Robbie Coburn (2023)
- I Ruined Your Life by Thomas Moore (2025)
