= Karèn Shainyan =

Russian journalist (born 1981)

- Карен Шаинян
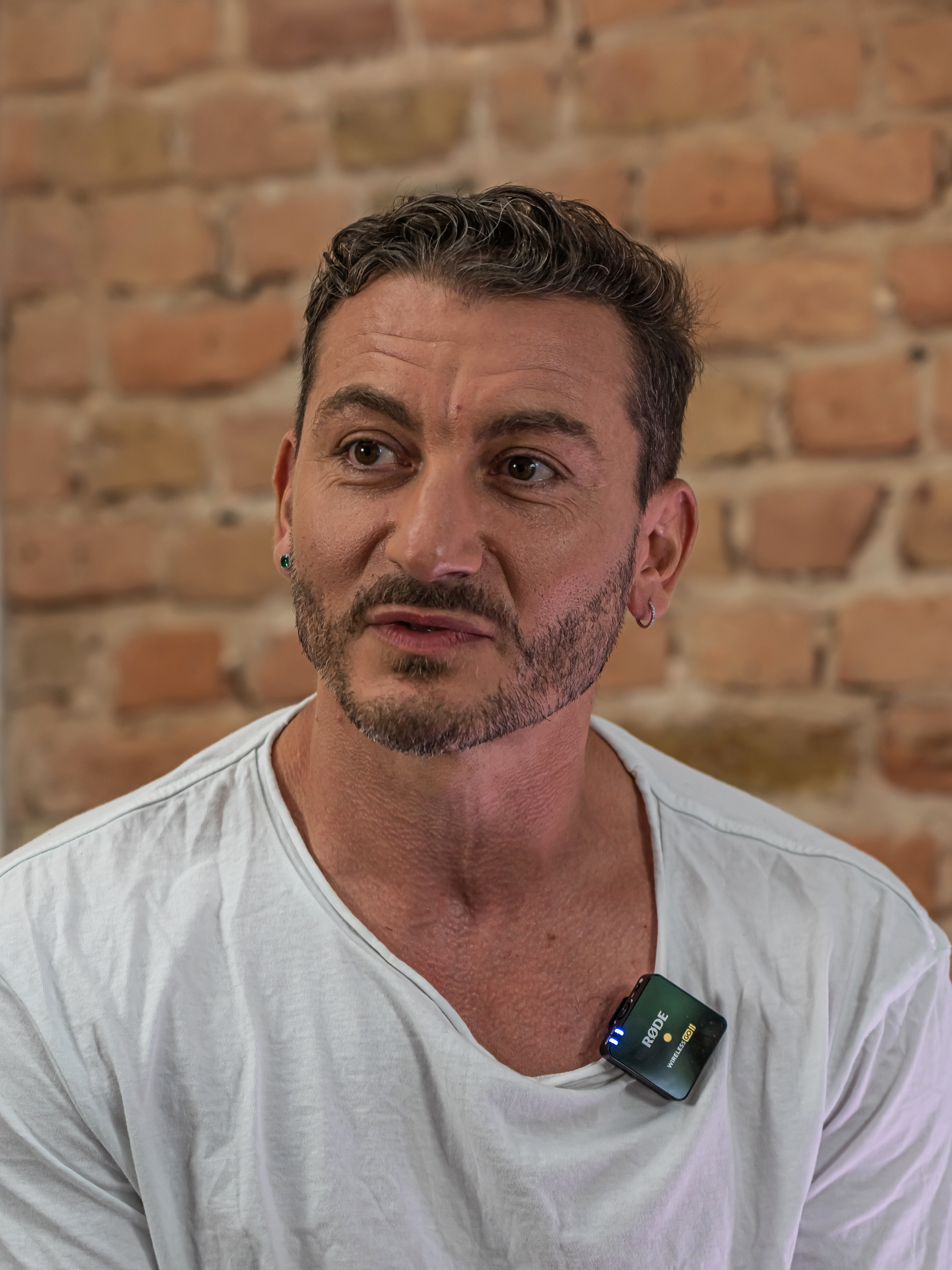
- Born: 1 July 1981 (age 45); Irkutsk, Russian SFSR, Soviet Union
- Citizenship: Russia
- Education: Russian National Research Medical University
- Occupations: Journalist, YouTuber

Karèn Bagratovich Shainyan (Russian: Карен Багратович Шаинян; born 1 July 1981) is a Russian journalist and YouTuber.

== Biography ==
Shainyan is originally from Irkutsk, in Siberia, the son of two scientists. In 2005 he obtained a university degree in biochemistry from the Russian National Research Medical University. Openly gay, he runs a YouTube channel called Straight Talk with Gay People, where he interviews international LGBT+ figures in order to dispel myths commonly held in Russia about the LGBT+ community. The channel's 2020 interview with American actor Billy Porter marked the first time a Russian journalist had interviewed Porter.

He co-founded the Future History studio with Mikhail Zygar. He was one of the creators of the 1968.Digital show that was presented at the 2018 Cannes Film Festival.

In August 2020, he released a documentary titled The Chechen War on LGBT. In December 2020, he released a documentary titled Minsk: Queer and Techno Protest Against the OMON, documenting the experiences of the Minsk LGBT+ community during the 2020–2021 Belarusian protests and the subsequent repression by OMON, the Belarusian riot police.

In February 2022, he spoke out against the 2022 Russian invasion of Ukraine. In April 2022, he was designated a foreign agent by the Russian Ministry of Justice.

According to Novaya Gazeta Europe and The Insider, in July 2023 Shainyan was listed in the Rosfinmonitoring list of "extremists and terrorists".

In 2023, Shainyan moved to London and decided to pursue training in psychoanalysis. He applied to and was accepted by the Tavistock and Portman Clinic. Although Shainyan is sometimes described as an LGBTQ+ activist, he disagrees with this label. In his own words, he has never been an activist. "I have always worked in media and have never violated journalistic standards," he stated in an interview with Holod.
