= Frisk (novel) =

1991 novel by Dennis Cooper

- Author: Dennis Cooper
- Language: English
- Genre: Novel
- Publisher: Grove Press
- Publication date: 1991
- Publication place: United Kingdom
- Media type: Print
- Pages: 128 pp (paperback edition)
- ISBN: 0-8021-3289-8 (paperback edition)
- Preceded by: Closer

Frisk is a 1991 novel by Dennis Cooper. It is the graphic account of a man obsessed with snuff pornography involving young boys, who goes on to commit acts of extreme violence in Holland. In 1995, the book was made into a film of the same name directed by Todd Verow.

It is the second novel in the George Miles Cycle.

== Plot summary ==
Frisk is narrated by Dennis, who had a troubled childhood. In 1969, aged 13, he was regularly allowed to read pornographic magazines and was particularly affected by snuff pornography, but he later learns that the pictures were faked. He recognises that Henry, now aged 17, was the 13/14-year-old boy portrayed in the pictures.

Dennis is gay and has a drug addiction, and is devastated when his boyfriend Julian leaves him to go to France. Dennis takes up with Julian's younger brother Kevin. The boy is psychologically troubled, yet 18-year-old Dennis involves him in drugs and starts a sexual relationship.

In 1989, Julian receives a letter from Dennis describing how he embarked on a sadistic killing spree in Amsterdam. The descriptions in the letter are explicit and the torture and sadism are described in graphic terms. Dennis initially moved to Europe in search of Julian but ended up staying in Holland where he met two Germans, and, after telling them of his first two murders, joined forces with them to commit a series of random, motiveless murders. One of the most recent victims was an 11-year-old boy, whom they tortured before mutilating and murdering in Dennis' home, a converted windmill, two weeks before the letter was written.

Julian travels to Amsterdam with Kevin to find out if the murders in the letters are true or just a cruel fantasy.
