= Jerk (play) =

- Original language: French
- Written by: Dennis Cooper
- Characters: David Brooks, Dean Corll, Elmer Wayne Henley
- Genre: Puppet play

Premiere
- Date: 5 March 2008

Jerk is a one-person puppet play by the American writer Dennis Cooper, made in collaboration with director Gisèle Vienne and performer Jonathan Capdevielle, based on Cooper's 1993 novel of the same name. It is based on the story of serial killer Dean Corll and his teenage accomplices David Brooks and Elmer Wayne Henley.

The play develops the conceit that Brooks has learnt puppetry in prison and, as part of his rehabilitation, acts out the murders in which he participated via the use of glove puppets and ventriloquism. The performance also involved sections in which the audience read about the murders in pamphlets, entitled "Two Texts for a Puppet Play by David Brooks" that were distributed.

The production premiered on 5 March 2008 in Brest, France. The play was also performed in an English-language version at the South London Gallery as part of the Paris Calling season of performing arts, opening on 1 July 2009. Its performance included music by Peter Rehberg.

In his analysis of Jerk, theater scholar Jordan Schildcrout states, "The production becomes a meta-puppet show when the actor playing David is giving voice to the puppets playing the killers, who in turn give voice to the puppets playing the corpses... In the final scenario, though, David abandons his puppets and does all the voices, including his own, as a ventriloquist, not moving his lips, as if he is also losing his humanity, becoming increasingly inanimate.

In the story, David is ultimately alone in a house of corpses, and in performance he is alone on an empty stage, with only lifeless puppets sharing the space."

== Sources ==
- Cooper, Dennis. 1993. Jerk. San Francisco: Artspace. ISBN 0-9631095-1-0.
- Jerk on denniscooper.net. Retrieved 7 April 2010.
- Jerk on Gisèle Vienne. Retrieved 7 April 2010.
- SLG Events. Retrieved 7 April 2010.
- Viegener, Matias (June 22, 1993). "Review of the novel Jerk". Artforum. Archived from the original on May 21, 2007 – via HighBeam Research.
