= Circle jerk (disambiguation) =

A circle jerk is a sexual practice involving group masturbation, especially when all-male.

Circle jerk may also refer to:

- a slang term for an echo chamber
- Circle Jerks, an American punk band
- "Circle Jerk", a song by Aerosmith from Pandora's Box
- Circle Jerk, a multimedia play by Michael Breslin and Patrick Foley
