= Jerkin (disambiguation) =

A jerkin is a man's short close-fitting jacket.

Jerkin may also refer to:

- Falconer's term for a male gyrfalcon
- Jerkinhead roof, a roof with a squared-off gable
- Jerkin', a hip hop dance movement that originated in Los Angeles
- "Jerkin'", a 2024 song by Amyl and the Sniffers from their album Cartoon Darkness
- "Jerkin' the Dog", a 1960s dance song

== See also ==
Gherkin (disambiguation)
