= Dennis Cooper =

American writer (born 1953)

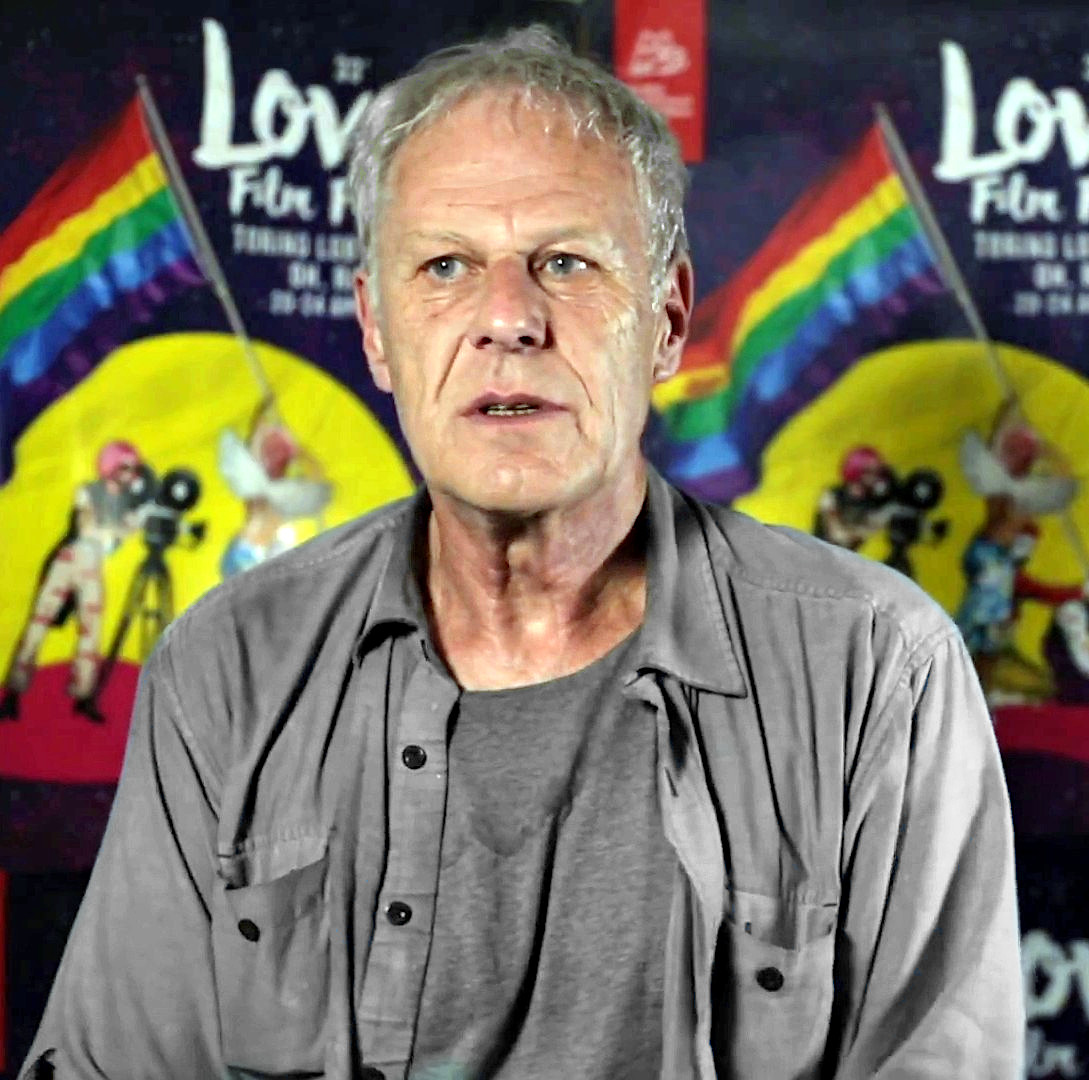
- Dennis Cooper in 2018
- Born: Clifford Dennis Cooper; January 10, 1953 (age 73); Pasadena, California, U.S.
- Education: Pasadena City College; Pitzer College
- Occupations: Novelist; poet; critic; editor; blogger; performance artist
- Writing career
- Subjects: Sexual fantasy, gay desire, existentialism, death, troubled teenagers, drug use, the inadequacy of language
- Website: denniscooperblog.com

Dennis Cooper (born January 10, 1953) is an American novelist, poet, critic, film director, editor and performance artist. He is best known for the George Miles Cycle, a series of five semi-autobiographical novels published between 1989 and 2000 and described by Tony O'Neill "as intense a dissection of human relationships and obsession that modern literature has ever attempted." Cooper is the founder and editor of Little Caesar Magazine, a punk zine, that ran between 1976 and 1982.

== Early life ==
Clifford Dennis Cooper was born in Pasadena, California and raised in Arcadia, the son of Clifford Cooper, a self-made businessman who was one of the early designers of parts for uncrewed space expeditions. His parents were politically conservative, with his father acting as an advisor to several presidents, including Richard Nixon, with whom he cultivated a close friendship. One of his brothers, Richard, was named after Nixon. Cooper's parents divorced when he was in his early teens. Cooper attended public schools before he started attending Flintridge Preparatory School in high school; he was expelled in 11th grade. He attended Pasadena City College and Pitzer College.

Cooper began reading French literature at 15 and was drawn to Marquis de Sade in particular for his risqué depictions of libertine sex. He was also inspired by French novelists/directors such as Jean Cocteau, Alain Robbe-Grillet, and Marguerite Duras. Though he had started writing surreal stories at age 12, he became a more focused writer at 15 and tried to imitate the writing styles of Arthur Rimbaud and de Sade. He began planning out a five-book series that would later become the George Miles Cycle. Punk subculture was a major part of his twenties. In 1976, Cooper moved to London for a brief period.

== Career ==
Cooper started Little Caesar Magazine in 1976; the punk zine, which ran for 12 issues between 1976 and 1982, featured multimedia contributions from Andy Warhol, David Wojnarowicz, Debbie Harry, Bob Flanagan, and Toby Ross. In 1978, he started Little Caesar Press, which would go on to help establish artists such as Amy Gerstler, Peter Schjeldahl, and Elaine Equi. Cooper published his first book of poetry, Idols, in 1979 and his second, Tenderness of the Wolves, in 1981. Tenderness of Wolves was nominated for a Los Angeles Times Book Prize the same year.

In 1979, he began working as the Director of Programming at the Beyond Baroque Literary Arts Center, where he continued to produce Little Caesar Magazine. He held this position until 1983, when he moved to New York City. Shortly after, he published his first novella, Safe, and became serious about writing the five-book series he had been planning since he was fifteen. He left New York in 1985 to follow a boyfriend to Amsterdam, where he finished Closer, the first book in the George Miles Cycle and Cooper's first novel. To get into the right headspace to write Closer, Cooper regularly took meth. The book later won the very first Ferro-Grumley Award for gay literature. During this time, he supported himself financially by writing for American magazines such as The Advocate, Art in America, and Artforum, the latter eventually taking him on as a regular.

Cooper returned to New York in 1987, where he worked on Frisk and several projects including co-curating an exhibit with Richard Hawkins entitled AGAINST NATURE: A Group Show of Work by Homosexual Men, which was open at the LACE in 1988. Cooper returned to Los Angeles in 1990 and continued collaborating with other artists, including composer John Zorn, painter Lari Pittman, sculptors Jason Meadows and Nayland Blake, and others. He also started the Little House on the Bowery curated imprint, which included works from Travis Jeppesen, Richard Hell, James Greer, Trinie Dalton, Derek McCormack, and others, under the independent publisher Akashic Books. In the 1990s, he wrote for Spin and published Period, the last book in the George Miles Cycle, in 2000. His novel The Sluts won the 2007 Prix Sade award in France and a Lammy.

Cooper moved to Paris in 2005 and has collaborated with French theater director Gisèle Vienne, composers Peter Rehberg and Stephen O'Malley, and the performer Jonathan Capdevielle on six works for the theater, I Apologize (2004), Un Belle Enfant Blonde (2005), Kindertotenlieder (2007), a stage adaption of his novella Jerk (2008), This Is How You Will Disappear (2010), and Last Spring, a Prequel (2011). The Weaklings was published in limited numbers by Fanzine Press in 2008 and was followed by a full-length collection The Weaklings (XL) in 2013.

Since living in France, Cooper has published a number of novels, had a cameo in Christophe Honoré's Homme au Bain, released a book/CD collaboration with Gisèle Vienne and Peter Rehberg, reissued the graphic novel Horror Hospital Unplugged he released with Keith Mayerson in 1997, and curated part of the 2012 Un Nouveau Festival with Gisèle Vienne. In 2012, Kunstverein Amsterdam held CLOSER: The Dennis Cooper Papers, a multimedia exhibit celebrating The George Miles Cycle.

In 2015, Cooper worked with artist Zac Farley to write and direct an anthology of short films titled Like Cattle Towards Glow. The two later collaborated for Permanent Green Light, which premiered in 2018 at the International Film Festival Rotterdam. In 2025, they directed their third film, Room Temperature.

== Google controversy ==
In mid-2016, Cooper engaged in a two-month standoff with Google after it deleted his blog and Gmail accounts without warning, due to what the company described as unspecified violations of their terms of use policy. Ten years of Cooper's writings were lost, including a novel. Cooper termed the situation "a nightmare". Cooper's plight attracted media attention, including from The New York Times, The New Yorker, The Guardian, Le Figaro, and Die Welt. Google's attorneys contacted Cooper and after long negotiations, returned his data.

== Influence ==
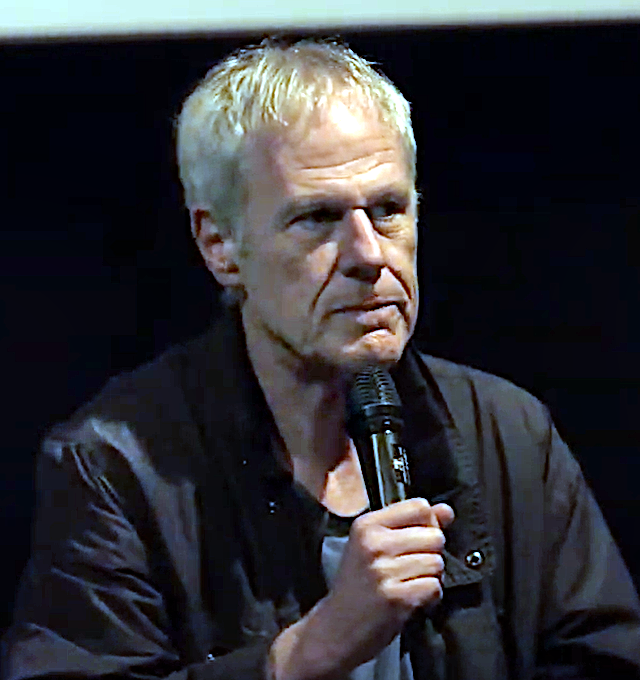
Cooper in 2020

Cooper's work has been acknowledged as an influence on a number of writers, including Travis Jeppesen, Kay Gabriel, Tony O'Neill, Jackie Ess, Noah Cicero, Shiv Kotecha, Jon Lindsey, Dominic Lyne and William Joseph Martin. Cooper's poetry, including the first poem he ever wrote (about David Cassidy) appear in the film Luster as the work of lead character Jackson. American indie rock band Deerhunter, experimental pop group Xiu Xiu, and grindcore act Pig Destroyer have each cited Dennis Cooper as a lyrical influence. Cooper has also influenced a number of artists such as Ryan Trecartin, Jonathan Mayhew, Lizz Brady, Chris Kelso, Daniel Portland, Jared Pappas-Kelley, Ken Baumann, Blair Mastbaum, which he has included in exhibitions such as the Weaklings or who he has showcased over the years. Within his work Cooper is often inspired by and quotes from underground and independent music; as with the lyrics of the band Hüsker Dü in the novel Try, and the naming of the 1992 curated show The Freed Weed, from a compilation by the band Sebadoh, which has been discussed in a number of interviews and analyses. My New Band Believe used his poem "Lecture, 1970" as the lyrical basis for their 2025 debut single "Lecture 25."

== George Miles Cycle ==
The cycle has now been translated into 18 languages and is the subject of numerous academic studies. They include two volumes of critical essays devoted to the cycle: Enter at Your Own Risk (2004), edited by Leora Lev, and Dennis Cooper: Writing at the Edge (2008), edited by Paul Hegarty and Danny Kennedy.

In the spring of 2000 Cooper published Period, the last of a series of five novels known as the George Miles cycle (ISBNs refer to the Grove Press paperback editions):

- Closer (1989), ISBN 0-8021-3212-X
- Frisk (1991), ISBN 0-8021-3289-8
- Try (1994), ISBN 0-8021-3338-X
- Guide (1997), ISBN 0-8021-3580-3
- Period (2000), ISBN 0-8021-3783-0

"… [I]n the ninth grade Cooper met his beloved friend George Miles. Miles had deep psychological problems and Cooper took him under his wing. Years later, when Cooper was 30, he had a brief love affair with the 27-year-old Miles. The cycle of books … came later, and were an attempt by Cooper to get to the bottom of both his fascination with sex and violence and his feelings for Miles."
— 3:AM Magazine, November 2001, "American Psycho: An Interview With Dennis Cooper" by Stephen Lucas

"George in Closer, whose room is full of Disney figures, himself becomes the toy of two forty-year-old men obsessed with the beauty of pain and suffering. In Frisk, an ex-friend is writing Julian letters: reports or fantasies of sex and violence. The description of the sexual murdering of young men is a melange of blood and slippery internal organs, too unappetizing to quote. The letters are being sent from a Holland windmill, in its isolation an ideal place for exploring the raw reality of sex, violence and death."
— VPRO Television; article in Dutch

In 2021, Cooper published I Wished, a sort of coda of the George Miles Cycle, through Soho Press. According to writer Justin Taylor, the novel is, "a postscript that functions just as handily as an introduction, deconstruction, or reboot."

== Other works ==
=== Fiction ===
- Antoine Monnier (fiction, Anon Press, 1978)
- My Mark (fiction, Sherwood Press, 1982)
- Safe (novella, SeaHorse Press, 1985)
- Wrong (short fiction, Grove Press, 1992)
- My Loose Thread (novel, Canongate, 2002)
- The Sluts (novel, Void Books, 2004; Carroll & Graf, 2005)
- God Jr. (novel, Grove Press, 2005)
- Ugly Man (short fiction, Harper Perennial, 2009)
- French Hole, being 15 outtakes from 'The Marbled Swarm' (Kiddiepunk, 2011)
- The Marbled Swarm (novel, Harper Perennial, November 2011)
- The Pyre/Le Bucher (short fiction, limited edition book given to the audience of Gisèle Vienne's performance work 'The Pyre', Editions POL, 2013)
- Zac's Haunted House (HTML Novel, Kiddiepunk, 2015)
- Zac's Control Panel (HTML Book, Kiddiepunk, 2015)
- I Wished (novel, Soho Press, 2021)
- Flunker (short fiction, Amphetamine Sulphate, 2024)

=== Poetry ===
- The Terror of Earrings (Kinks Press, 1973)
- Tiger Beat (Little Caesar Press, 1978)
- Idols (SeaHorse Press, 1979; Amethyst Press, 1989)
- Tenderness of the Wolves (The Crossing Press, 1981)
- The Missing Men (Am Here Books/Immediate Editions, 1981)
- He Cried (Black Star Series, 1985)
- The Dream Police: Selected Poems '69–93 (Grove Press, 1994)
- Thee Tight Lung Split Roar Hums (with Thurston Moore, Byron Coley; Slow Toe Press, 2004)
- The Weaklings (with illustrations by Jarrod Anderson, Fanzine Press, limited edition, 2008)
- The Weaklings (XL) (Sententia Books, 2013)

=== Collaborations and nonfiction ===
- Jerk (collaboration with artist Nayland Blake, Artspace Books, 1994)
- Horror Hospital Unplugged (graphic novel with illustrations by artist Keith Mayerson, Juno Books, 1997)
- All Ears (criticism and journalism, Soft Skull Press, 1997)
- Weird Little Boy' (provided texts for CD collaboration by John Zorn, Mike Patton, Trey Spruance, Chris Cochrane, William Winant, Avant, 1998)
- Violence, faits divers, littérature (non-fiction, POL, France, 2004)
- Dennis (CD/book, Don Waters Editions/AK Press, 2006)
- Two Texts for a Puppet Play by David Brooks (with Stephen O'Malley, Jean-Luc Verna; DACM, limited edition, 2008)
- SAFE with Dennis Cooper Ugly Man CD (Dot Dot Music, 2008)
- Peter Rehberg/Dennis Cooper Music for GV (Mego Records, 2008)
- Smothered in Hugs: Essays, Interviews, Feedback, Obituaries (Harper Perennial, 2010)
- Jerk / Through Their Tears CD/book (w/ Gisèle Vienne, Peter Rehberg, DisVoir, March 2011)
- Last Spring: The Maps multi-volume zine (w/ Gisèle Vienne, Le Cooperative Fanzine, 2011–2012)
- Gisèle Vienne 40 Portraits 2003 - 2008 (Editions POL, 2012)
- GONE: Scrapbook '80 - '82 (Infinity Land Press, 2014)

=== Theater ===
- The Pyre (Director: Gisèle Vienne, Score: Stephen O'Malley, Peter Rehberg; 2013)
- Last Spring, a Prequel (Director: Gisèle Vienne, Score: Stephen O'Malley, Peter Rehberg; 2011)
- This Is How You Will Disappear (Director: Gisèle Vienne, Score: Stephen O'Malley and Peter Rehberg, Visual Effects: Fujiko Nakaya & Shiro Takatani; 2010)
- Dedans/Dehors/David (Writer/Director: David Bobee, based on Cooper's novel "Closer", 2008)
- Jerk (Director: Gisèle Vienne, Score: Peter Rehberg/Pita; 2008)
- Jerk, radio play (France Culture/Radio France, 2007)
- Kindertotenlieder (Director: Gisèle Vienne, Score: Stephen O'Malley and Peter Rehberg/Pita; 2007)
- Une Belle Enfant Blonde (Co-written with Catherine Robbe Grillet, Director: Gisèle Vienne, Score: Peter Rehberg/Pita; 2005)
- I Apologize (Director: Gisèle Vienne, Score: Peter Rehberg/Pita; 2004)
- The Undead (Director: Ishmael Houston-Jones, Score: Tom Recchion; Visual Design: Robert Flynt; 1990)
- Knife/Tape/Rope (Director: Ishmael Houston-Jones, Sets: John De Fazio; 1985)
- Them (Director: Ishmael Houston-Jones, Score: Chris Cochrane; 1984, 2010)

=== Films ===
- Like Cattle Towards Glow (2015), co-directed with Zac Farlay
- Permanent Green Light (2018), co-directed with Zac Farlay
- Jerk (2021), written by Dennis Cooper and directed by Gisèle Vienne
- Room Temperature (2025), co-directed with Zac Farlay
