= Gennady Trifonov =

Russian poet and dissident (1944–2011)

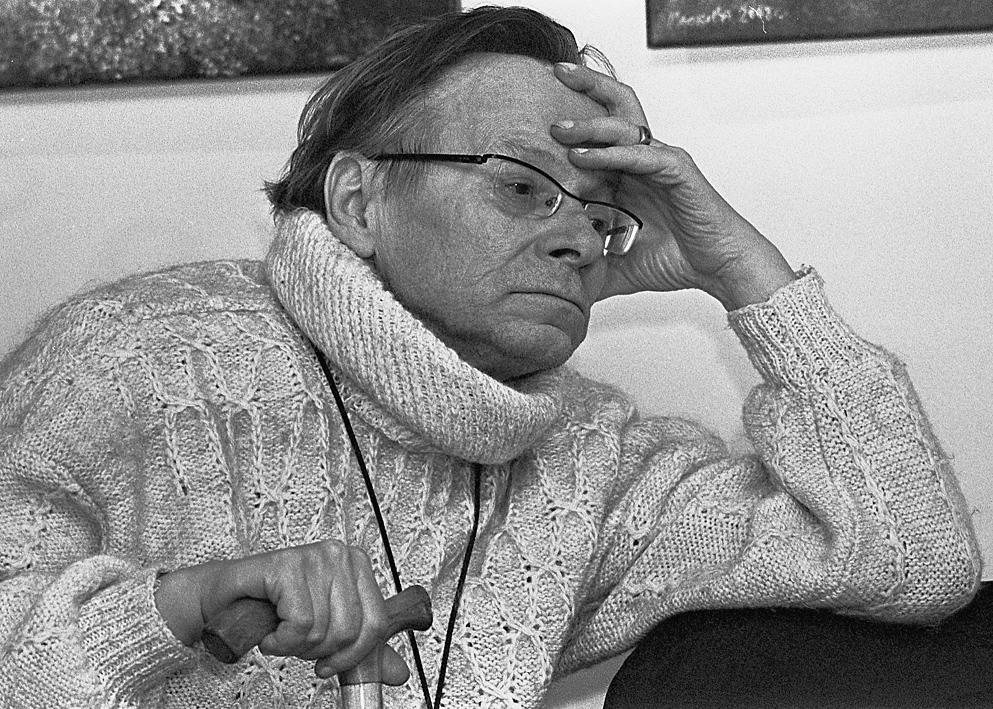
Gennady Trifonov in 2010

Gennady Trifonov (1944–March 2011) was a Russian poet and one of the only Soviet dissidents who publicly criticized the regime for its oppression of gay people.

Trifonov was born in Leningrad (now St. Petersburg) in 1944. He had been harassed by Soviet authorities since his military service, when he refused to inform on other homosexuals. In early 1976, Trifonov was arrested and beaten up by the Soviet police. Although the exact grounds for his punishment are disputed, it is believed that he was targeted for writing homosexual-themed poetry. In 1977, he wrote an impassioned open letter decrying the treatment of homosexual men in Soviet labor camps. He did not succeed at having it published in the Soviet Union, but it became known due to the efforts of Simon Karlinsky. His contacts in Western countries published his story in 1977 in several news outlets as an attempt to forestall further abuse by the KGB. Released after four years, Trifonov was refused an exit visa despite job offers in Western countries. Due to employment discrimination, he was forced to work manual labor jobs despite a slight build. In 1986, he was charged again with aggravated hooliganism.

Three of his poems, addressed to a Georgian dancer, were published in Gay Sunshine Journal in its spring 1977 issue.

After the fall of the Soviet Union, Trifonov protested against former dissidents who had ignored or mocked the plight of homosexuals in the Soviet camps. He was not optimistic regarding future tolerance of what he termed "sexual dissidents" in post-Soviet Russia, and was also skeptical that individual freedoms and democracy would be respected. Trifonov believed that a fundamental reckoning with Soviet crimes was needed for Russia to be reformed. According to Trifonov's research, more than 60,000 people were arrested under Soviet anti-homosexuality laws.
