= Shiv Kotecha =

American academic (born 1986)

Shiv Kotecha (Born September 29, 1986), is an American poet, writer, art critic, and academic.

== Career ==
Kotech received his Phd in English from New York University, where he teaches a course on poetry as an adjunct instructor. He is Co-Chair of the Writing Discipline for Bard MFA—Milton Avery Graduate School of the Arts.

He is the author of the book EXTRIGUE (Make Now, 2015), and a poetry volume The Switch (Wonder 2019), which consists of a novel in between two poems Charles Markbreiter in reviewing The Switch for The Believer wrote: "The Switch is less a critique of a critique than a way to ease out of it by writing poetry, even as it is also mourns for critique as one among many objects that once promised to make desire and disappointment go away..." While Katherine Beaman reviewing the work in Commonplace Review wrote "As with the body, so with The Switch. Each of its numerous elements can be isolated as its own throbbing member, or taken all-together, the united deific body restlessly twitching, asking what to do with itself, if not to speak".....

Kotecha is a regular contributor to Frieze. He has also written for ArtForum, The Capilano Review, The Brooklyn Rail', and The Nation. For the 2025 issue of BOMB Magazine he interviewed the essayist and poet Kay Gabriel.
