= Recognition of same-sex unions in Russia =

Russia does not recognize same-sex marriage or civil unions. Since 2020, the Russian Constitution has explicitly outlawed same-sex marriage. The Family Code of Russia also contains provisions forbidding same-sex marriages, which the Constitutional Court upheld as constitutional in 2006. Opinion polls have shown a decline in support for same-sex marriage in Russia. This declining trend has been attributed to anti-gay state propaganda, the 2013 gay propaganda law in particular, and growing anti-Western and traditionalist sentiment in Russia under Vladimir Putin.

Following the dissolution of the Soviet Union, several same-sex couples attempted to marry at registry offices in Russia. The first known case occurred in 1994, but the couple were denied a marriage license and later fled to the United States. A highly mediatized case occurred in 2009 when a same-sex couple was denied a license in Moscow. In the case of Fedotova and Others v. Russia, the European Court of Human Rights (ECHR) ruled that the Russian Government was violating Article 8 of the European Convention on Human Rights by not offering any form of legal recognition to same-sex relationships. However, a lawyer representing the plaintiff couple in this case said it was unlikely that "Russia would implement" the ruling. In addition, Russia was expelled from the Council of Europe on 16 March 2022 due to its invasion of Ukraine, and ceased to be a party to the ECHR on 16 September 2022.

== Legal restrictions ==
Article 1(3) of the Family Code of Russia (Russian: Семейный кодекс, romanized: Seméjnyj kódeks, pronounced [sʲɪˈmʲejnɨj ˈkodɨks]) (Note: In some regional languages of Russia: Abaza: ТгIачва кодекс, romanized: Tg°ačva kodeks; Adyghe: Унэгъо кодекс, romanized: Unăġo kodeks; Altai: Биле кодексы, romanized: Bile kodeksı, pronounced [biˈle ˈkodeksɯ]; Avar: Хъизан-кулпат кодекс, romanized: Ӿizan-kullat kodeks; Azerbaijani: Аилә мәҹәлләси, romanized: Ailə məcəlləsi; Bashkir: Ғаилә кодексы, romanized: Ğailə kodeksı, pronounced [ʁɑjˈlæ ˈkodeksɯ]; Buryat: Гэр бүлын кодекс, romanized: Ger bülyn kodeks; Chechen: Доьзалан кодекс, romanized: Dözalan kodeks; Chuvash: Ҫемье кодексӗ, romanized: Śem'e kodeksĕ, pronounced [ɕʲeˈm⁽ʲ⁾je ˈkodʲeksʲɘ]; Crimean Tatar: Аиле кодекси, romanized: Aile kodeksi, pronounced [ɑjˈle ˈkodeksi]; Dargwa: ХъалицIа кодекс, romanized: X̱aliⱬa kodeks; Erzya: Кудораське кодекс, romanized: Kudoraśke kodeks; Finnish: Perhekoodi; Hill Mari: Йиш кодекс, romanized: Jiš kodeks; Ingush: Дезала кодекс, romanized: Dezala kodeks; Kabardian: Бынунагъуэ кодекс, romanized: Bynunaghue kodeks; Kalmyk: Өрк-бүлән кодекс, romanized: Ôrk-bula̋n kodeks; Karachay-Balkar: Юйюр джорукълары, romanized: Üjür coruqları, pronounced [yˈjyr dʒoruqlaˈrɯ]; Karelian: Perehkodeksi, pronounced [ˈperehˌkodeski]; Kazakh: Отбасы кодексі, romanized: Otbasy kodeksı; Khakas: Сöбiре кодексы, romanized: Söbire kodeksı, pronounced [søbɘˈre ˈkodeksɯ]; Komi: Семейнӧй кодекс, romanized: Śemejnöj kodeks; Kumyk: Уягьлю кодексы, romanized: Ujaǧlü kodeksı, pronounced [u.jaʁˈly ˈkodeksɯ]; Lak: Кулпатрал кодекс, romanized: Kulpatral kodeks; Lezgian: Хзандин кодекс, romanized: Xzandin kodeks; Meadow Mari: Еш кодекс, romanized: Eš kodeks; Moksha: Тнал кодекс, romanized: Tnal kodeks; Nogai: Aьел кодексы, romanized: Äel kodeksı; Iron Ossetic: Бинонтӕ кодекс, romanized: Binontæ kodeks, pronounced [ˈbinontɐ ˈkodeks]; Tatar: Гаилә кодексы, romanized: Gailä kodeksı, pronounced [ɡɑjˈlæ ˈkʊde̞ksɤ̞]; Tuvan: Өг-бүлелиг дүрүмү, romanized: Ög-bülenig dürümü, pronounced [ø̀ɣbʏlɛˈnɪɣ tʏ̀rʏˈmʏ]; Udmurt: Семья кодексэз, romanized: Śem'ja koďekśez, pronounced [ɕʲeˈm⁽ʲ⁾ja ˈkodʲeksʲez]; Ukrainian: Сімейний кодекс, romanized: Siméjnyj kódeks, pronounced [s⁽ʲ⁾iˈmɛjnɪj ˈkɔdeks]; Veps: Kanzaline kodeks; Yakut: Кэргэн кодекса, romanized: Kergen kodeksa, pronounced [keɾˈɡen ˈkɔdie̯ksa]; Yiddish: משפּחה־געזעצבוך, romanized: Mishpokhe-gezetsbukh.) bans same-sex marriage, stating: "Regulation of family relations must adhere to the principle of a voluntary union between a man and a woman […]." This ban was introduced in 1995. A 2006 judgement from the Constitutional Court of Russia upheld this statutory ban, and rejected claims that banning same-sex marriages was a violation of constitutional rights. Previously, the family law of the Soviet Union did not contain an explicit ban on same-sex marriages.

=== 2020 constitutional amendments ===
Following the 2020 constitutional referendum, the Russian Constitution has explicitly banned same-sex marriage. The Moscow Times reported in March 2020, after the amendments had passed unanimously in the State Duma, "The 67-year-old Putin, who has dominated Russia for 20 years, has sought to cast himself as a defender of traditional values and rally support by promoting anti-Western and conservative ideas. Putin's fourth stint in the Kremlin has seen a strong pivot to more conservative policies, with groups promoting fundamentalist Orthodox Christian views gaining more legitimacy and liberal viewpoints attacked as Moscow's relations with the West have soured." The referendum, which also allowed Putin to serve as president until 2036, was criticized by international observers claiming widespread irregularities including voter coercion, multiple voting, violation of secrecy of the vote and allegations of police violence against a journalist who was present to observe.

Article 72 of the Constitution now reads:

The following shall be within the joint jurisdiction of the Russian Federation and constituent entities of the Russian Federation: [...] g.1) protection of the family, maternity, fatherhood and childhood; protection of marriage as a union of a male and a female; creation of conditions for decent upbringing of children in a family, and for fulfilling by children of legal age of their obligation to take care of parents; [...] (Note: Russian: В совместном ведении Российской Федерации и субъектов Российской Федерации находятся: [...] ж.1) защита семьи, материнства, отцовства и детства; защита института брака как союза мужчины и женщины; создание условий для достойного воспитания детей в семье, а также для осуществления совершеннолетними детьми обязанности заботиться о родителях; [...])

=== Recognition of marriages performed abroad ===
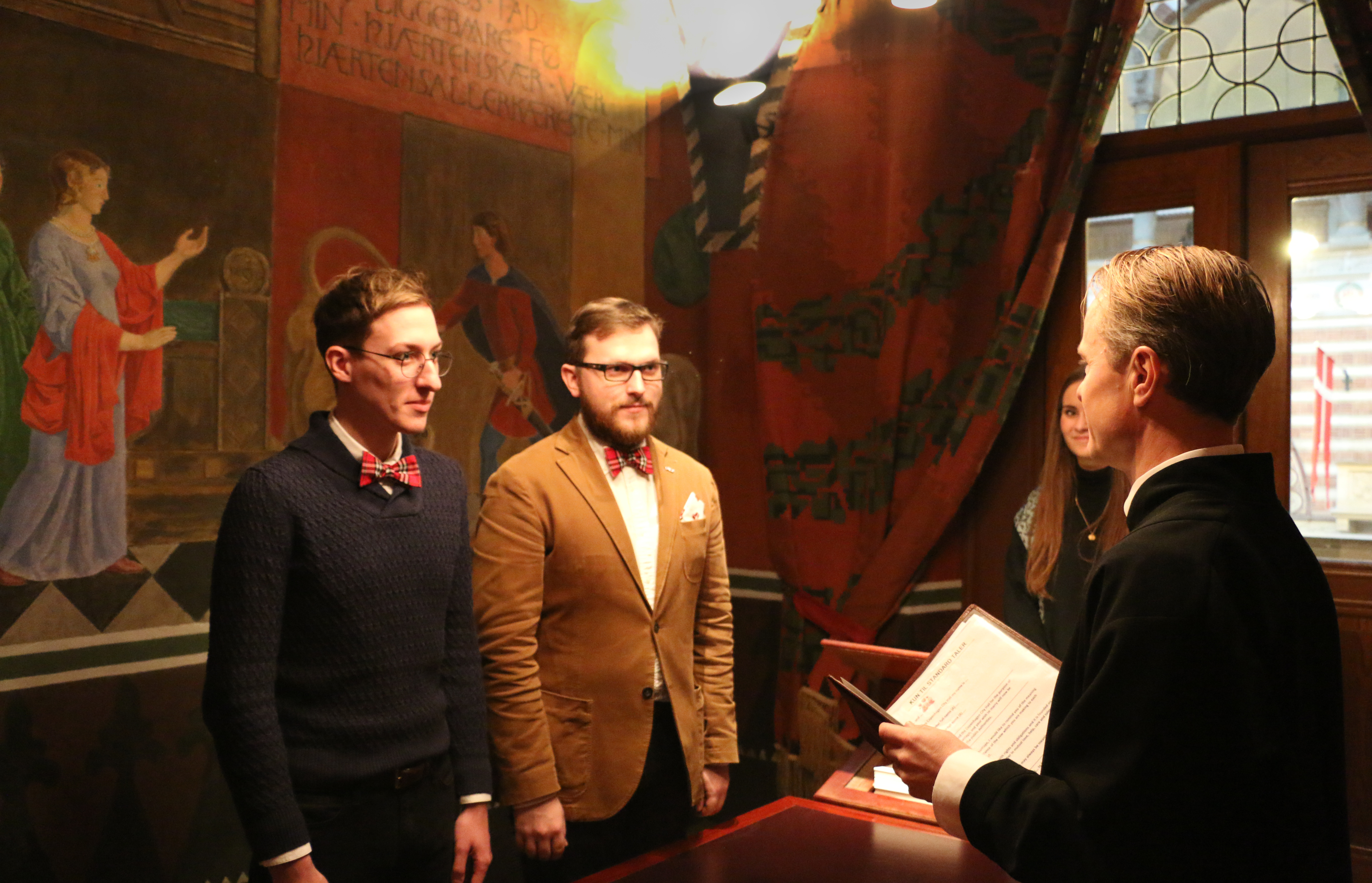
Pavel Stotsko and Evgenii Voitsekhovskii marrying at Copenhagen City Hall, Denmark, 4 January 2018

Russian citizens can register a same-sex marriage in countries whose laws allow it for foreigners, such as Argentina, Iceland, Norway, Portugal or South Africa. According to article 158 of the Family Code, marriages concluded abroad are recognized in Russia, unless explicitly outlawed by article 14 of the Code, which prohibits marriage between close relatives, and between adoptive parents and adopted children. As a result, the recognition of same-sex marriage in Russia remains a controversial issue among lawyers. Some argue that foreign same-sex marriages can be recognized in Russia. Other jurists and authorities refer to article 167 of the Code, which states: "The norms of foreign family law do not apply if such application would contradict the fundamentals of the legal order (public order) of the Russian Federation. In this case, the legislation of the Russian Federation shall apply." Thus, they argue that same-sex marriages contracted abroad cannot be recognized in Russia.

A test case for the recognition of foreign marriages occurred in January 2018 when Pavel Stotsko and Evgenii Voitsekhovskii, who had married in Denmark on 4 January 2018, were indirectly acknowledged by Russian authorities as married on their passports. However, the couple later fled Russia citing threats to their liberty and security, and the official who stamped their passports was dismissed. The Ministry of Internal Affairs also declared the passports invalid, and a court case accusing the couple of "intentional damage to official documents" was filed in court. The police issued a statement that it would not protect the couple from homophobic vigilantes. Another case occurred in June 2020, when Igor Kochetkov received a tax deduction from the Federal Taxation Service under the health insurance scheme of his husband Kirill Fedorov, whom he married in the United States in 2017.

On 14 October 2020, a bill was submitted to the Federal Assembly to explicitly ban the recognition of foreign marriages which contravene the "fundamental laws of order and morality", including same-sex marriages. The government announced its opposition to the bill on 20 October, and it was not approved.

=== Recognition of marriages of transgender people ===
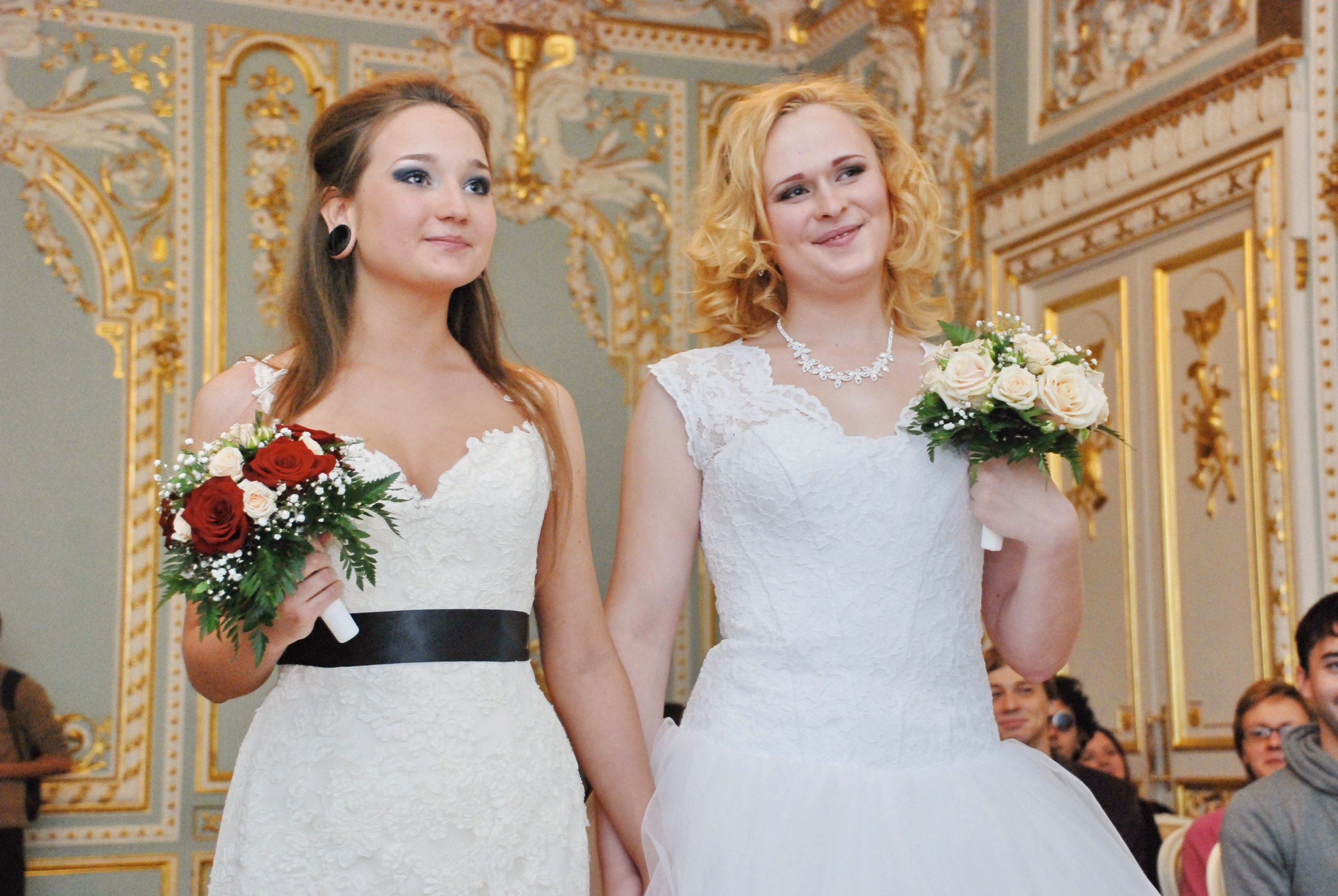
Alyona Fursova (left) and Irina Shumilova (right) marrying in Saint Petersburg, 7 November 2014

The Family Code does not explicitly ban marriages to transgender people. Thus, de facto same-sex marriages are theoretically possible in Russia if one of the spouses is transgender; marriages are only possible if both spouses are of the opposite legal sex. On 7 November 2014, Irina Shumilova and Alyona Fursova were married in Saint Petersburg, exploiting this legal loophole as Shumilova had not completed a legal gender change and was still legally a man. Both spouses wore wedding dresses at the ceremony. News of the marriage was leaked to the media, despite the couple not wanting to go public. Employees of the registry office which conducted the marriage said they had "fully complied" with the marriage laws of Russia as Shumilova and Fursova were legally of the opposite sex. A similar case had occurred a few months prior, when Alina Davis, 23, and Alison Brooks, 19, had applied to marry in a registry office on Kutuzovsky Prospekt in Moscow. The application was accepted as Davis was legally a man.

These two cases led MP Vitaly Milonov to introduce legislation banning "inappropriate clothing" at marriages, but the bill was not passed. In 2015, MPs Aleksey Zhuravlyov, Anatoly Greshnevikov and Dmitri Gorovstov proposed legislation explicitly banning marriages if one of the spouses has completed or intended to complete a sex change procedure. The bill was rejected by a parliamentary committee on the basis that it would be "impossible" to organize gender checks of all newlyweds. In July 2023, President Vladimir Putin signed into law a bill banning transgender people from modifying their legal gender on official documents and annulling marriages in which one spouse had completed a legal gender change. Transgender people may still be able to marry if they have not completed a legal gender change and if their partner is of the opposite legal sex.

=== Federal subject constitutional bans and laws ===
Same-sex marriage is constitutionally banned in all the republics of Russia: Adygea, Altai, Bashkortostan, Buryatia, Chechnya, Chuvashia, Crimea, Dagestan, Ingushetia, Kabardino-Balkaria, Kalmykia, Karachay-Cherkessia, Karelia, Khakassia, Komi, Mari El, Mordovia, North Ossetia–Alania, Sakha, Tatarstan, Tuva, and Udmurtia. Their constitutions define marriage as "the voluntary union of a woman and a man". Many were amended in the aftermath of the 2020 constitutional referendum, which also modified the Russian Constitution to ban same-sex marriages. Previously, their constitutions did not contain an explicit ban on same-sex marriages and either did not address the issue or defined marriage as "based on the voluntary consent and equality of the spouses". Same-sex marriage is also banned by law in the Jewish Autonomous Oblast.

Marriage is a legislative power of the Russian Parliament. Republics may enact their own family laws provided they do not conflict with the federal Family Code, which is the primary source of family law in Russia. Article 1(4) of the Family Code of the Republic of Tatarstan (Russian: Семейный кодекс Республики Татарстан, romanized: Seméjnyj kódeks Respúbliki Tatarstán; Tatar: Татарстан Республикасының Гаилә кодексы, romanized: Tatarstan Respublikasınıñ Gailä kodeksı) defines marriage as the "union of a man and a woman". Similarly, article 1(3) of the Family Code of the Republic of Bashkortostan (Russian: Семейный кодекс Республики Башкортостан, romanized: Seméjnyj kódeks Respúbliki Baškortostán; Bashkir: Башҡортостан Республикаһының Ғаилә кодексы, romanized: Bashqortostan Respublikahınıñ Ğailə kodeksı) states that "family relations are based on the voluntary union of a man and a woman". The Family Code of the Donetsk People's Republic (Russian: Семейный кодекс Донецкой Народной Республики, romanized: Seméynyj kódeks Donétskoy Naródnoy Respúbliki), a contested republic annexed by Russia in 2022, also defines marriage as the "marital union of a man and a woman".

== Immigration rights ==
In 2016, the European Court of Human Rights (ECHR) ruled that Russia had violated the rights of a Kazakh man who lived with his Russian same-sex partner in Yekaterinburg. The man had lived with his partner for several years but as a non-Russian national was not permitted to remain in the country indefinitely. Immigration officials had refused to issue the plaintiff a residence permit recognizing his stable cohabitation with a Russian citizen. While lower courts refused to issue him a permit, the ECHR ruled that their relationship was protected by the right to private life and family life guaranteed by the European Convention of Human Rights.

== Registered partnerships ==
Russia does not recognize registered partnerships (Russian: гражданское партнёрство, graždánskoje partnjórstvo, pronounced [ɡrɐʐˈdanskəjə pɐrtˈnʲɵrstvə]), (Note: In some regional languages of Russia: Aghul: ватандашинф союз, romanized: vatandašinf sojuz; Rutul: ватангьаIлиешды союз, romanized: vatanğaʼlieşdı soyuz; Tabassaran: ватандашарин союз, romanized: vatandašarin sojuz; Tat: союз ватандаши, romanized: sojuz vatandaši; Tsakhur: ватандашна союз, romanized: vatandaşna soyuz.) which would offer a subset of the rights, benefits and obligations of marriage for opposite-sex or same-sex couples. In 2018, some lawmakers introduced legislation to recognize opposite-sex registered partnerships. However, the bill was rejected due to concerns that it could in the future lead to the recognition of same-sex unions.

In 2016, the social-liberal Yabloko party adopted a party platform supporting civil partnerships. While running in the 2018 presidential election, Ksenia Sobchak expressed her support for civil unions.

== Same-sex marriage ==
Laws regarding same-sex partnerships in Europe¹ Marriage Civil union Limited domestic recognition (cohabitation) Unrecognized Constitution limits marriage to opposite-sex couples ¹ May include recent laws or court decisions that have not yet entered into effect.

=== Background ===
Historical research has shown that during the time of the Russian Empire in the early 20th century, when homosexuality was still outlawed and same-sex relationships were taboo, some couples established "marriage contracts" and lived together in joint households. One couple, Nikolay Polyakov and Stepan Minin, were known to have lived together until 1933 when they were arrested in an anti-gay purge organized by Soviet authorities. In 1922, Evgenia Fyodorovna, dressing as a man and having forged fake identity documents, married her partner in Saint Petersburg. Authorities soon discovered that Fyodorovna was in fact a woman and opened a criminal case against the couple, accusing them of a "crime against nature". The People's Commissariat of Justice later ruled the marriage "legal, as concluded by mutual consent". After Joseph Stalin came to power in 1924, oppression of LGBT people increased and same-sex unions between men were re-criminalized. Despite this, attempts to register same-sex marriages continued. In 1965, a woman known only by her initials O.A. forged a passport with a male name and married her partner. Similarly, in the 1970s, Olga Krause married her partner in Saint Petersburg after having forged a fake passport.

In the early 1990s, activists including Evgenia Debryanskaya and Roman Kalinin began calling for the legalization of same-sex marriage in Russia. In April 1994, Slava Mogutin and his partner Robert Filippini applied to marry at a registry office in Moscow. Although the director of the office was sympathetic, she said she could not by law perform the marriage. This made the couple the target of highly publicized criminal cases, carrying potential prison sentences of up to 7 years' imprisonment. The couple later fled and filed for political asylum in the United States.

=== Early marriage registrations in 2003–2005 ===
Laws regarding homosexuality in Asia Same-sex sexual activity legal Marriage performed Marriage recognized Other type of partnership Unregistered cohabitation No recognition of same-sex couples Restricted or ambiguous Restriction on freedom of expression, not enforced Severe restriction of association with arrests or detention Same-sex sexual activity illegal Prison, not enforced Prison Death penalty on books, not enforced Enforced death penalty

In 2003 to 2005, there were active debates in civil society surrounding the issue of same-sex marriage. This was facilitated by its legalization in the Netherlands, Belgium, Spain, and Canada, and attempts by several Russian same-sex couples to marry at registry offices.

In 2003, Denis Gogolev and Mikhail Morozov were secretly married in a church in Nizhny Novgorod by a priest of the Russian Orthodox Church. The move proved controversial, and the couple were later turned away when they attempted to register their marriage at a registry office. The Holy Synod of the Russian Orthodox Church later declared the marriage "null and void". In September 2005, the couple entered a "partnership agreement", drawn up by a notary, which acknowledged the couple's cohabitation and guaranteed certain de facto rights, such as property rights and inheritance, if the couple were to separate or if one of the partners were to die. In 2004, two women in Tula were married at a local registry office because the Georgian surname of one of them seemed "masculine" to government officials.

In April 2004, Eduard Murzin, a member of the State Assembly of the Republic of Bashkortostan, introduced a bill to legalize same-sex marriage in Bashkortostan by removing statutory language that banned same-sex marriage in the republic. The bill was not put to a vote. In January 2005, Murzin, who is heterosexual, and Eduard Mishin, editor-in-chief of a gay magazine, submitted an application to marry in the Butyrsky District in Moscow. They were rejected, and subsequently filed a case challenging the refusal in court. They argued that prohibiting same-sex couples from marrying violated Article 19 of the Russian Constitution. A lower court dismissed their lawsuit on 15 February, and the Moscow City Court upheld this decision in April 2005. The Supreme Court of Russia later rejected Murzin's appeal, ruling that it was not authorized to modify the law. In November 2006, the Constitutional Court dismissed an appeal and upheld the statutory ban on same-sex marriages as constitutional. The European Court of Human Rights dismissed the case without comment in June 2008. Murzin was not only criticized by conservatives and religious leaders, but also by LGBT activists who questioned the timing of the litigation, noting that Russia had no anti-discrimination laws at the time. During this time, some activists in Karelia also publicly called on the Legislative Assembly of the Republic of Karelia to legalize same-sex marriage.

In April 2006, Rabbi Nellie Shulman blessed the marriage of a Jewish lesbian couple in Moscow. The marriage was controversial and strongly condemned by the Federation of Jewish Communities of Russia.

=== Fedotova case ===
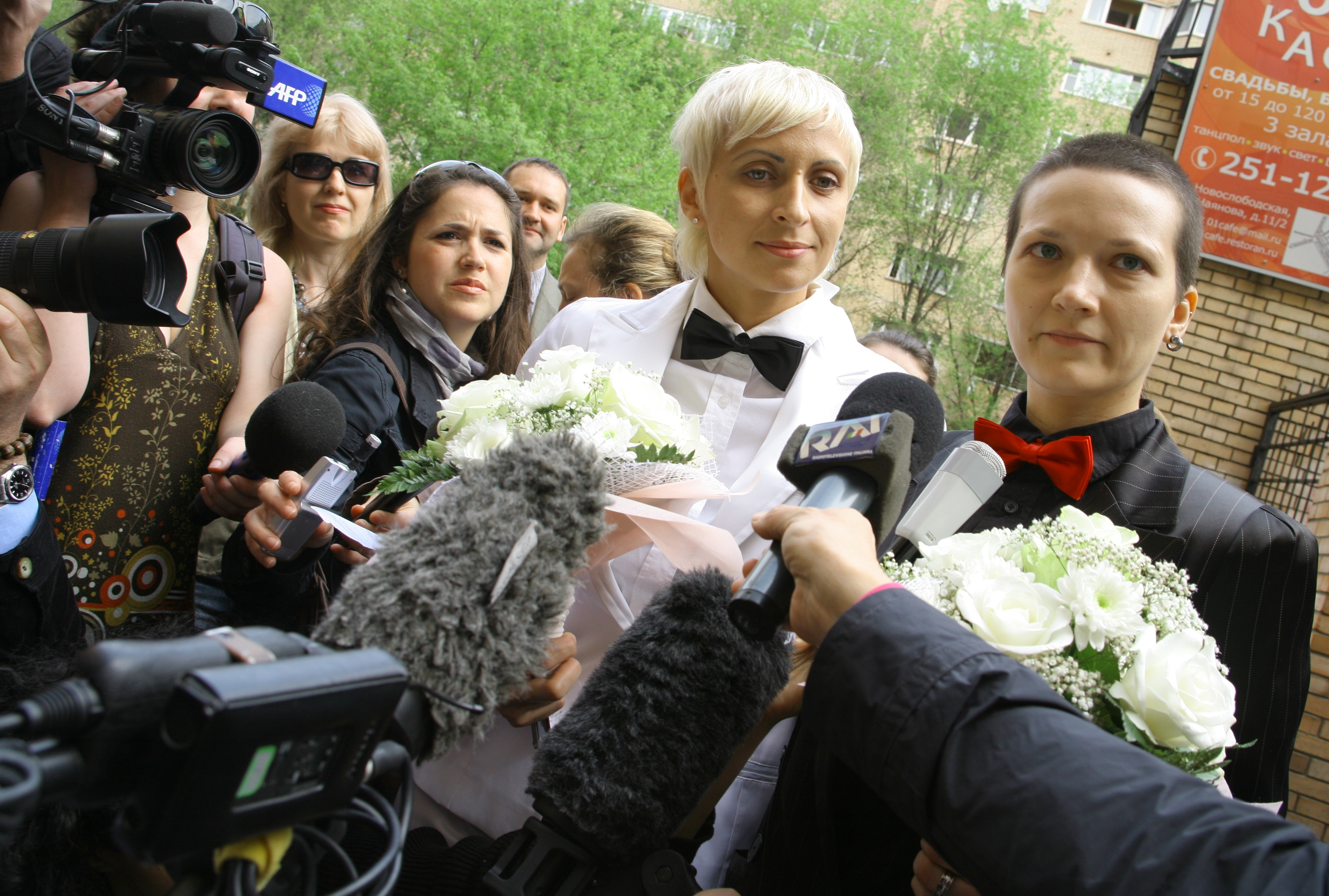
Irina Fedotova and Irina Shipitko at a registry office in the Tverskoy District in Moscow, where they were later denied a marriage license, 12 May 2009

In April 2009, LGBT activist Nikolay Alexeyev launched a campaign to legalize same-sex marriage in Russia. On 12 May 2009, a lesbian couple, Irina Fedotova and Irina Shipitko, applied for a marriage license at the Tverskoy Office for the Registration of Civil Acts in the Tverskoy District in Moscow. The couple said, "We are no different from other people. […] We love Russia, we were born and live here, and we want our marriage to be recognized in Russia. […] We have love, we have happiness, we want to be together for our whole lives and we want to do this here in Russia." The couple said they did not expect their marriage to be registered, but hoped the attempt would draw attention to the issue of LGBT rights in Russia. The registration attempt occurred a few days before Slavic Pride scheduled for 16 May in Moscow.

The registry office indeed refused to issue them a license, citing article 1(3) of the Family Code. The couple received a written denial from the head of the office, Svetlana Potamyshneva, who denied to register the marriage stating that "Point 3 of Article 1 of the Family Code of Russia stipulates that the regulation of family relations must adhere to the principle of a voluntary union between a man and a woman." In June 2009, the couple challenged the denial to the Tverskoy District Court, claiming that "the Russian Constitution and family laws do not prohibit same-sex marriages. In addition, family and marriage rights, including those same-sex, are guaranteed with Articles 8 and 12 of the European Human Rights Convention ratified by the Russian Federation". The court scheduled oral arguments for 26 August 2009, but later postponed them to 9 September and then to 6 October. The District Court dismissed their case on 6 October, citing the 2006 judgement of the Constitutional Court in the Murzin case that there was no constitutional violation in denying marriage rights to same-sex couples. Alexeyev told journalists that the case would be appealed up to Supreme Court and to the European Court of Human Rights. The couple announced they would legally register their marriage in Canada and later seek its legal recognition in Russia. The couple married as planned in Toronto on 23 October in a ceremony officiated by Judge Harvey Brownstone. Numerous media and local activists were present at the ceremony during which Fedotova and Shipitko exchanged vows. The newlywed couple received their marriage license, which they hoped would be recognized in Russia upon coming back home. On 21 January 2010, the Moscow City Court upheld the decision of the Tverskoy District Court. The couple later appealed to the European Court of Human Rights (ECHR), which registered their case on 18 January 2011.

In June 2013, five same-sex couples—three male couples and two lesbian couples—applied to marry at a local registry office in Saint Petersburg. The office refused to perform the marriages citing article 1(3) of the Family Code. On 26 July 2013, one of the couples, Dmitry Chunosov and Yaroslav Yevtushenko, challenged the refusal in court in the Gryazinsky District, Lipetsk. On 2 August 2013, a lower court in Gryazi dismissed the case, citing the 2006 Murzin ruling, as well as the 2013 Russian gay propaganda law and the 2010 ECHR case in Schalk and Kopf v. Austria that member states are not obliged to recognize same-sex marriages. The decision was upheld on appeal on 7 October 2013 by the Lipetsk Regional Court. The other couples' cases were also dismissed; Ilmira Shayhraznova and Elena Yakovleva also in Gryazi, Pavel Lebedev and Kirill Kalugin in Voronezh, Yury Gavrikov and Maxim Lysak in Saint Petersburg, and Yana Petrova and Elena Davydova in Moscow. Chunosov and Yevtushenko, and Shayhraznova and Yakovleva appealed their cases to the ECHR, which combined them for oral arguments with Fedotova.

The couples argued that Russia had violated Article 12 of the European Convention on Human Rights, which guarantees the right to marry, Article 8, which guarantees a right to private and family life, and Article 14, which provides a right not to be discriminated against. In July 2021, the ECHR ruled in Fedotova and Others v. Russia that Russia "had an obligation to ensure respect for the applicants' private and family life by providing a legal framework allowing them to have their relationships acknowledged." It rejected the Russian Government's argument about public disapproval of same-sex unions, finding that "access to rights for a minority could not be dependent on the acceptance of the majority." Referring to the 2020 constitutional amendments, the court stated that Russia could give same-sex couples "access to formal acknowledgment of their couples' status in a form other than marriage", which would not conflict with the "traditional understanding on marriage" in Russia. A lawyer representing the plaintiff couples said it was unlikely that "Russia would implement [the judgment]". The Grand Chamber upheld the ruling on 17 January 2023. It held by fourteen votes to three that there had been a violation of Article 8 of the European Convention on Human Rights. This decision places a positive obligation on all member states of the Council of Europe to legalize same-sex partnerships. However, Russia was expelled from the Council of Europe on 16 March 2022 due to its invasion of Ukraine, and ceased to be a party to the ECHR on 16 September 2022.

=== Indigenous Siberians ===
While there are no records of same-sex marriages as understood from a Western perspective being performed among the indigenous peoples of Siberia, there is evidence for identities and behaviours that may be placed on the LGBT spectrum. Many of these cultures recognized two-spirit individuals who were born male but wore women's clothing and performed everyday household work and artistic handiwork which were regarded as belonging to the feminine sphere. This two-spirit status allowed for marriages between two biological males or two biological females to be performed among some of these tribes. Among the Aleut, an indigenous people living on the Aleutian Islands, two-spirit individuals wore women's clothing and "copied all aspects of the feminine role", with such authenticity that "strangers to the tribe were not able to distinguish them from biological women". They are known in their language as ayagigux̂ (айагигуӽ, pronounced [ˌajaˈɣiɣoχ]). Marriages between ayagigux̂ and cisgender men, often a tribal chief, were commonplace, suggesting that such marriages had prestige value, "The husband regarded his ayagigux̂ as a major social accomplishment, and the family profited from association with their new wealthy in-law." Wealthy Aleut men usually maintained polygynous marriages, and so it is likely that the ayagigux̂ were not exclusive wives, but rather part of a polygynous marital relationship.

The Siberian Yupiks refer to two-spirit individuals as aghnaasiq (аӷна̄сиқ, pronounced [ɑʁˈnɑːsiq]). They wore women's clothing and occupied a cultural position as shamans, and were "regarded as especially powerful". The aghnaasiq could marry either men or women. Among the Chukchi people, the "most powerful shamans" were "transformed men who have so thoroughly adopted the characteristics of femininity that it is believed they can give birth to spirits", known as йыркъаԓявыԓ (jyrkʺaḷâvyḷ, Chukot pronunciation: [jərkʔaɬˈjawəɬ]. These individuals could enter into socially condoned marriages with young girls. This is "further accompanied by a marriage to a spiritual entity that can direct and command the household vicariously through the vessel of the shaman". Anthropologist Vladimir Bogoraz also reported female shamans who "transformed into men", known as ӄԓикэтгичеӈ (ḳḷikètgičeň, pronounced [qɬiketˈɣitʃeŋ]). "Such transformations were always on a spirit's orders and were greatly feared by the young shamans who wished to remain their biological gender.", according to Bogoraz.

=== Religious performance ===
The Russian Orthodox Church remains strongly opposed to same-sex marriage. In 2016, Patriarch Kirill of Moscow called same-sex marriage a form of "Soviet totalitarianism", and in May 2017 likened it to Nazism during a visit to Kyrgyzstan. In 2003, a priest secretly married a same-sex couple, but was dismissed and the marriage declared "null and void".

== Public opinion ==
Opinion polls have reported a decline in support for same-sex marriage in Russia. A 1995 survey by the Russian Public Opinion Research Center (RPORC; Всероссийский центр изучения общественного мнения) showed that 18% of Russians had a positive view of same-sex marriage, while 38% had a negative one. In January 2005, a RPORC poll showed that support had decreased to 14%, while 59% were opposed. A May 2005 poll from the Levada Center (Левада-Центр) showed similar numbers supporting same-sex marriage, 14.3%, while 73.4% were opposed.

According to the Levada Center, support for same-sex marriage declined from 14% in 2010 to 10% in 2012, 5% in 2013 and 7% in 2015. An April–July 2015 survey conducted by the RPORC showed that 8% of Russians supported same-sex marriage, while 80% were opposed. Alexei Firsov, RPORC's communications director, was quoted as saying, "It's interesting that we [Russia] are swimming against the current, strengthening, despite global trends, intolerance toward homosexual relationships. This indicator might serve as a parameter of national identification." A survey by the Pew Research Center, conducted between 1 July and 31 July 2015, found that 5% of Russians favored or strongly favored allowing gays and lesbians to marry, whereas 90% opposed. This was one of the lowest levels of support among the 18 Eastern European countries polled, with only Georgia and Armenia reporting lower levels of support, both at 3%. Support was 3% among Russians aged 35 and above, 5% among Orthodox people, 8% among irreligious people, and 9% among 18–34-year-olds.

A June 2019 Public Opinion Foundation (Фонд Общественное Мнение) survey showed that 7% of Russian respondents supported same-sex marriage, while 85% were opposed and 8% were undecided. A 2021 RPORC poll showed that support had increased to 12%, whereas 75% of Russians were opposed and 13% were undecided or did not answer.

Polls have shown that support for same-sex marriage is highest among women, young people, people who have completed higher education, liberals, people with high incomes, and residents of Moscow and Saint Petersburg. For instance, a 2008 Agency for Social Information (Агентство Социальной Информации) poll showed that 34% of Saint Petersburg residents supported same-sex marriage. In 2011, support was 21% in both Moscow and Saint Petersburg. This declining trend of support for same-sex marriage has been attributed to anti-gay state propaganda and growing anti-Western and traditionalist sentiment in Russia under Vladimir Putin.

== See also ==
- Gayrussia.ru
- LGBT rights in Russia
- LGBT culture in Russia
- Moscow Pride
- Nikolay Alexeyev
- Recognition of same-sex unions in Asia
- Recognition of same-sex unions in Europe
