= List of gay, lesbian or bisexual people: K =

This is a partial list of notable people who were or are gay men, lesbian or bisexual.

The historical concept and definition of sexual orientation varies and has changed greatly over time; for example the general term "gay" wasn't used to describe sexual orientation until the 20th century. A number of different classification schemes have been used to describe sexual orientation since the mid-19th century, and scholars have often defined the term "sexual orientation" in divergent ways. Indeed, several studies have found that much of the research about sexual orientation has failed to define the term at all, making it difficult to reconcile the results of different studies. However, most definitions include a psychological component (such as the direction of an individual's erotic desire) and/or a behavioural component (which focuses on the sex of the individual's sexual partner/s). Some prefer to simply follow an individual's self-definition or identity.

The high prevalence of people from the West on this list may be due to societal attitudes towards homosexuality. The Pew Research Center's 2013 Global Attitudes Survey found that there is “greater acceptance in more secular and affluent countries,” with "publics in 39 countries [having] broad acceptance of homosexuality in North America, the European Union, and much of Latin America, but equally widespread rejection in predominantly Muslim nations and in Africa, as well as in parts of Asia and in Russia. Opinion about the acceptability of homosexuality is divided in Israel, Poland and Bolivia.” As of 2013, Americans are divided – a majority (60 percent) believes homosexuality should be accepted, while 33 percent disagree.

== K ==
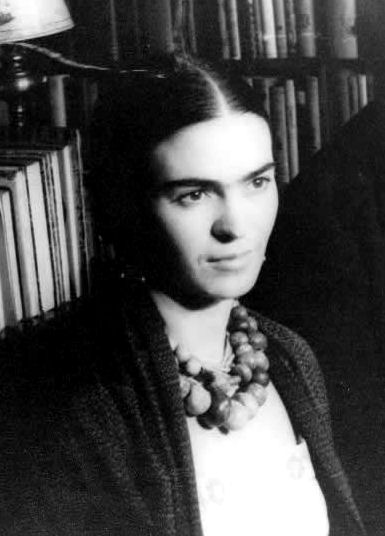
Painter Frida Kahlo

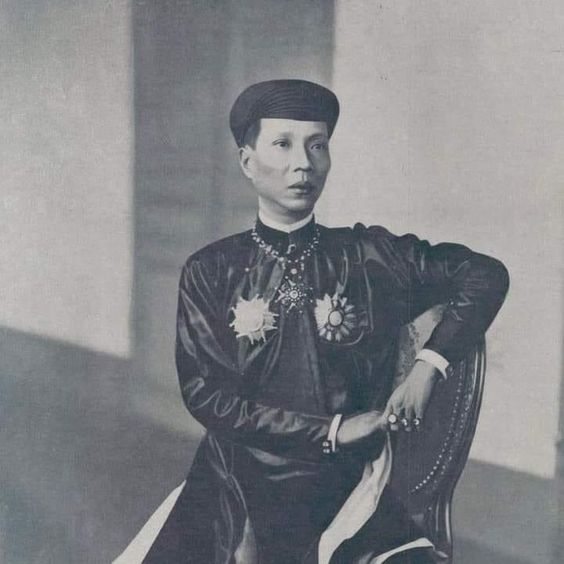
Emperor Khải Định

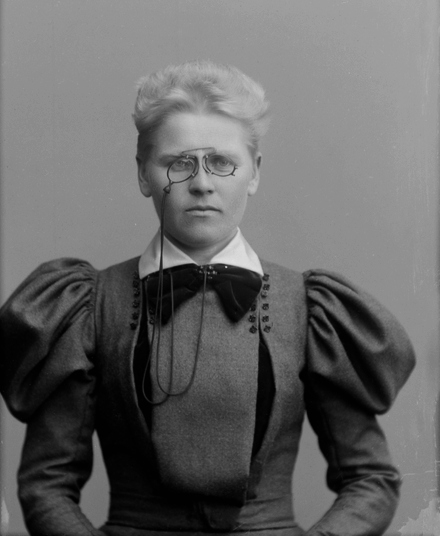
Writer and politician Hilda Käkikoski

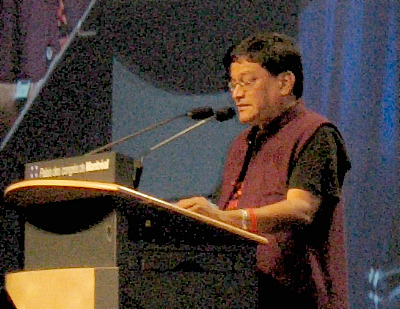
Journalist Ashok Row Kavi

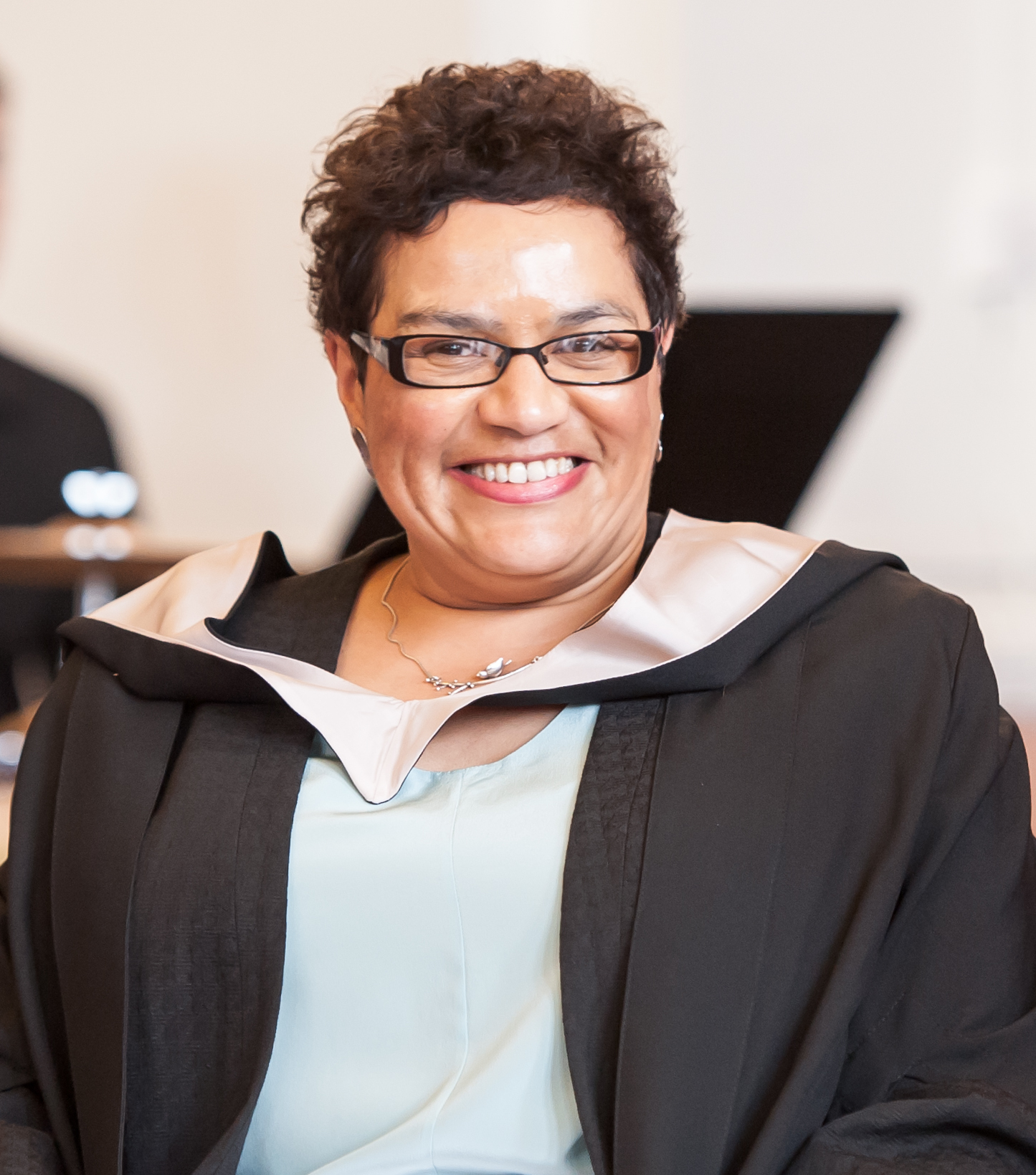
Poet, playwright, and novelist Jackie Kay

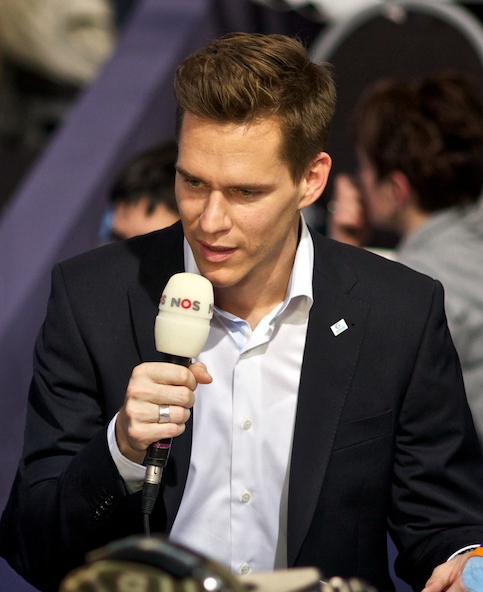
Swimmer Johan Kenkhuis

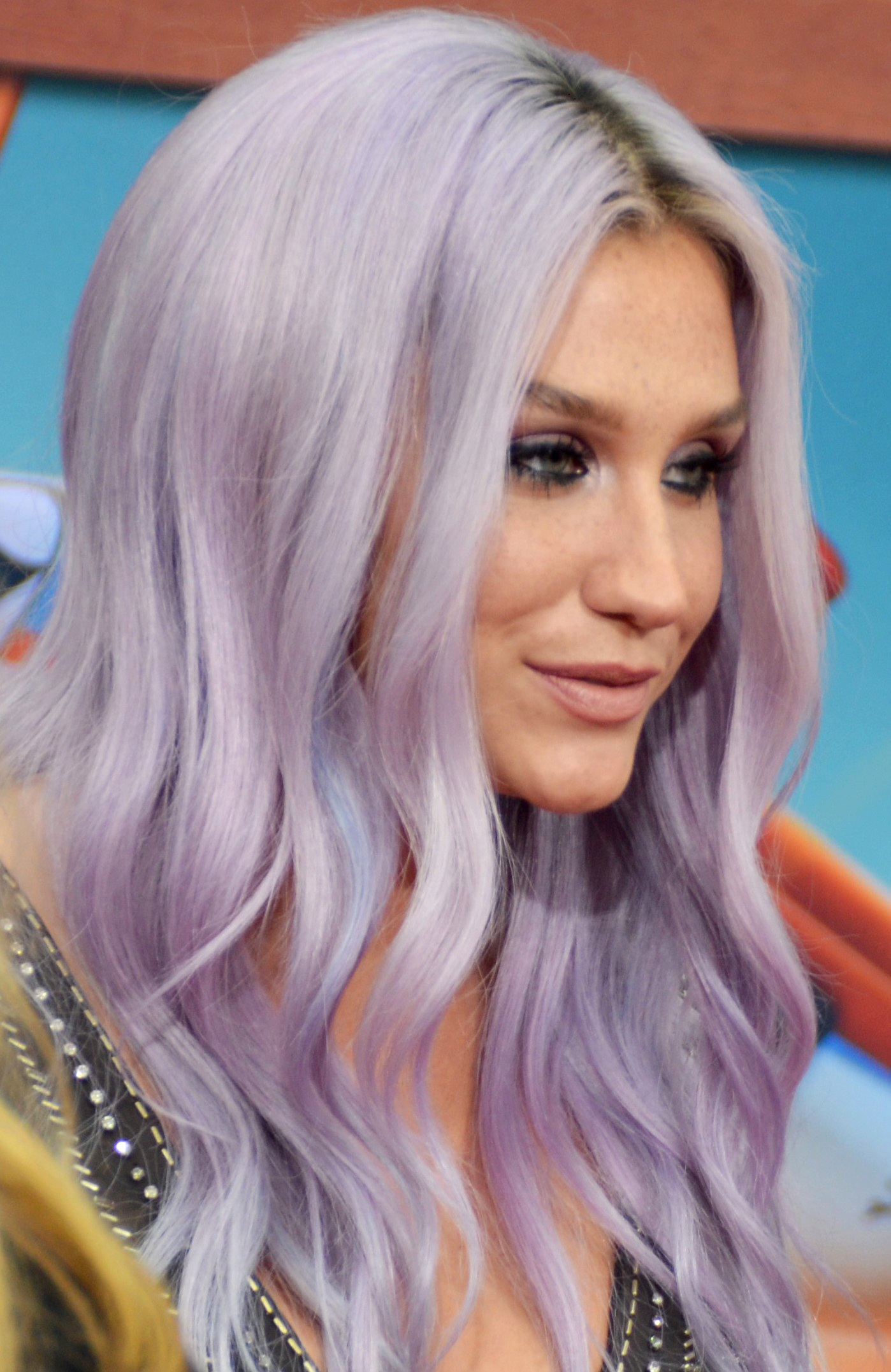
Singer-songwriter Kesha

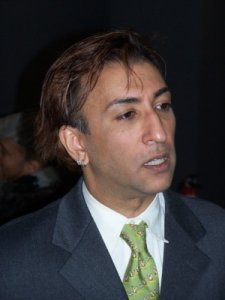
Lawyer El-Farouk Khaki

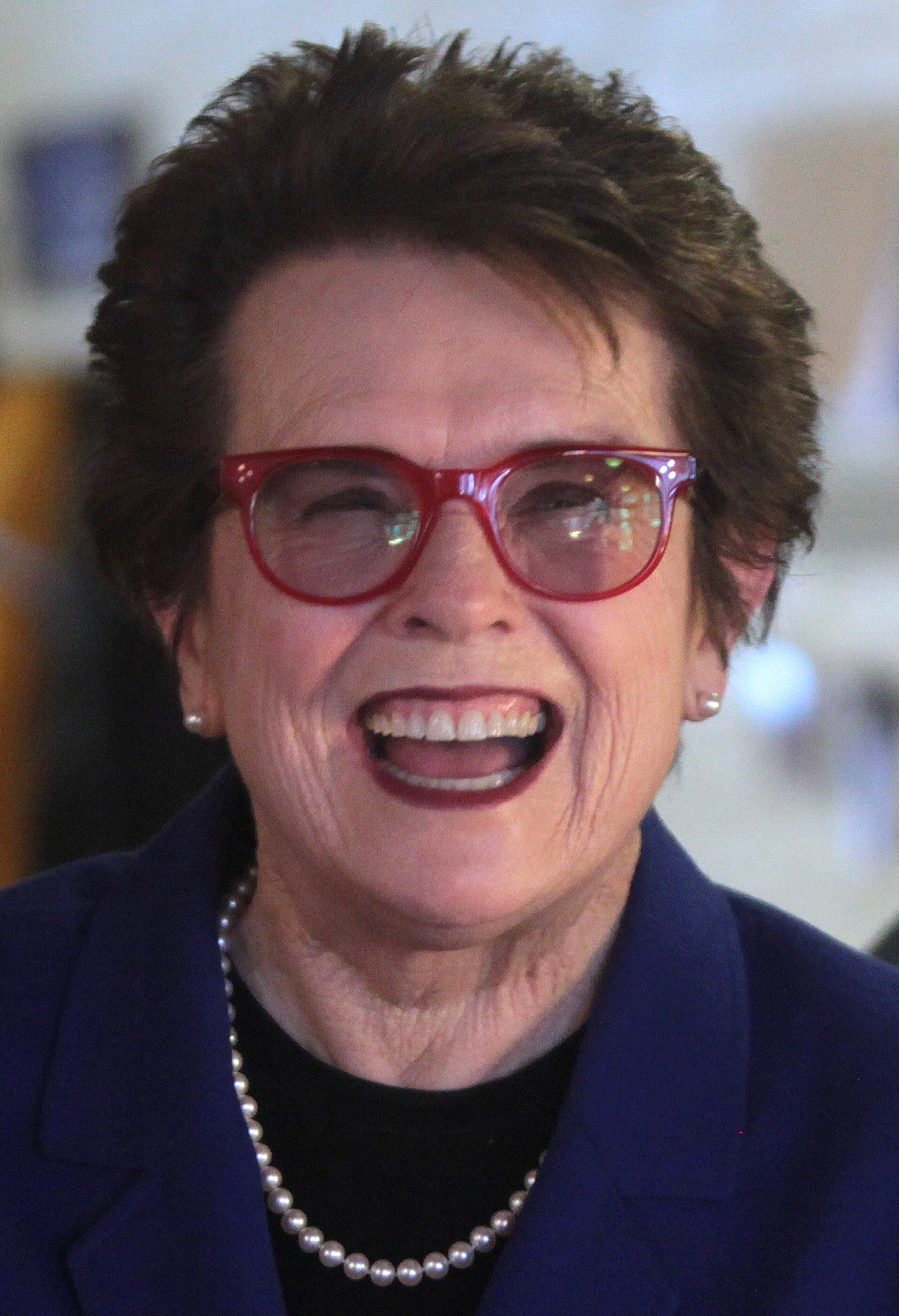
Tennis player Billie Jean King

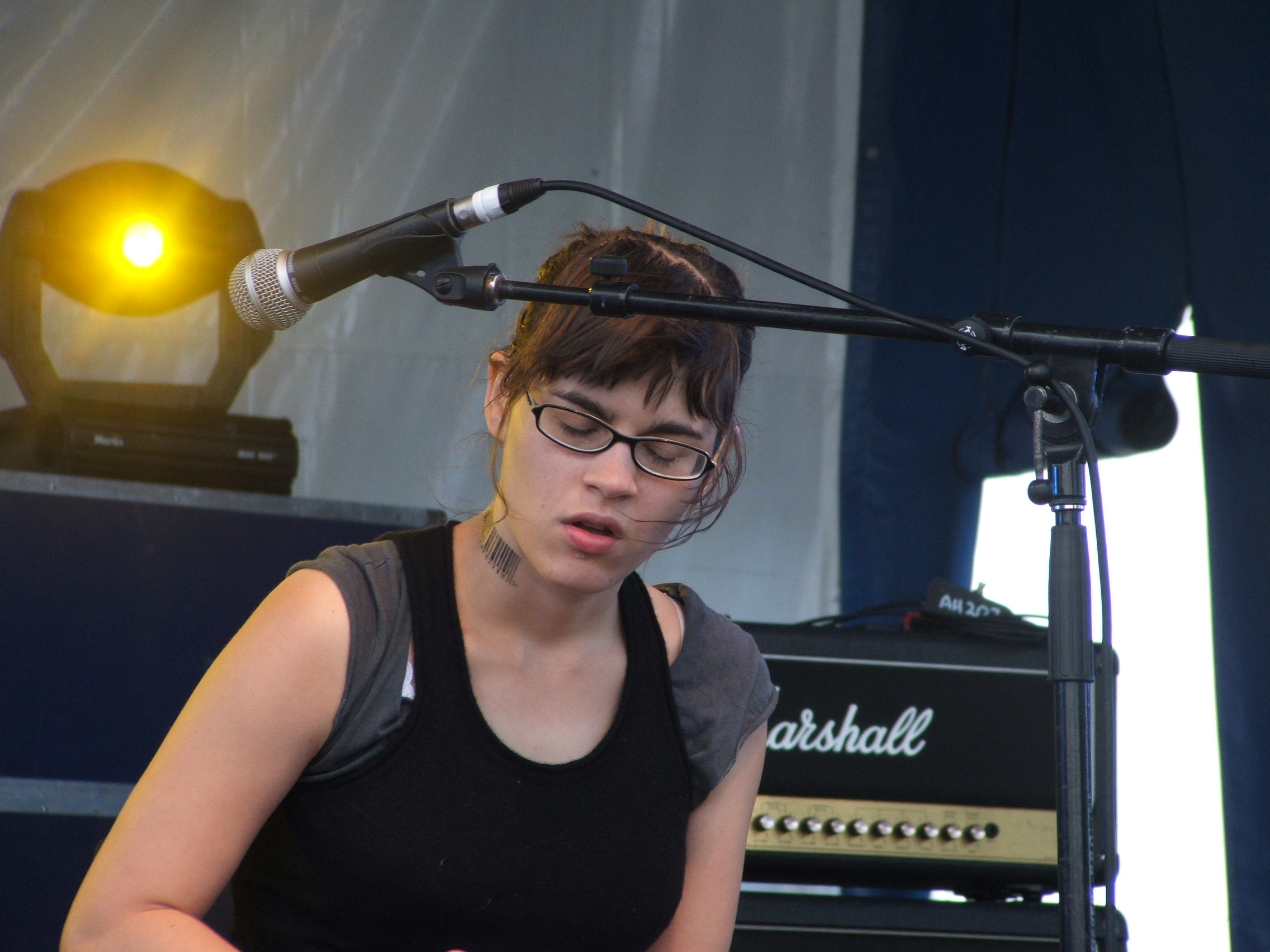
Musician Kaki King

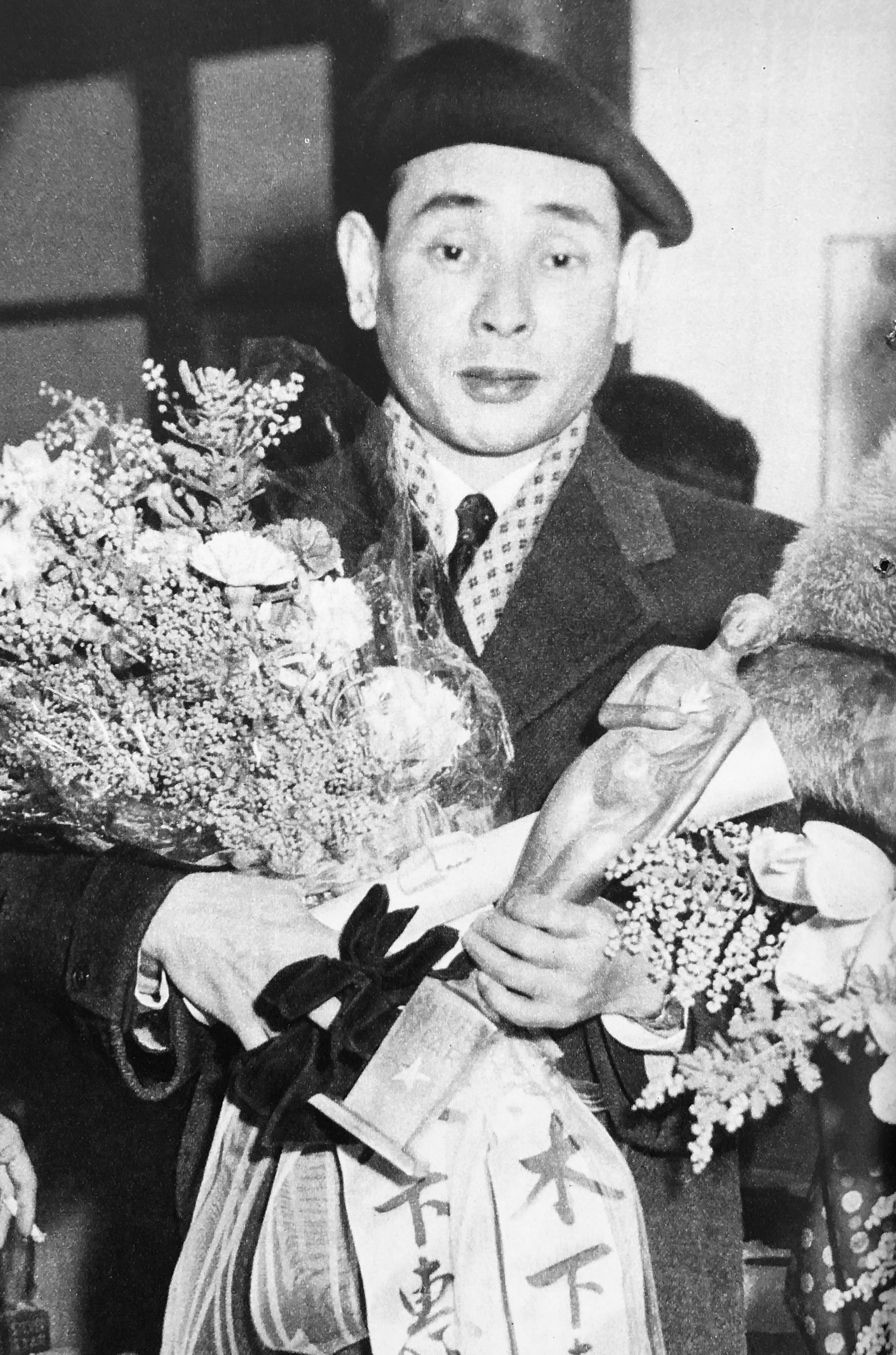
Film director and screenwriter Keisuke Kinoshita

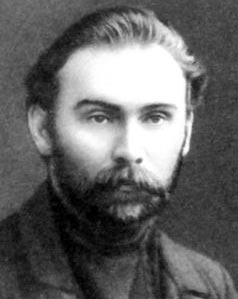
Poet Nikolai Klyuev

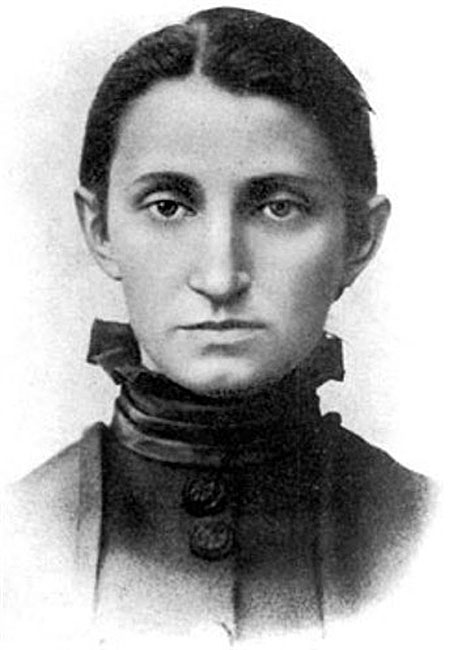
Writer and feminist Olha Kobylianska

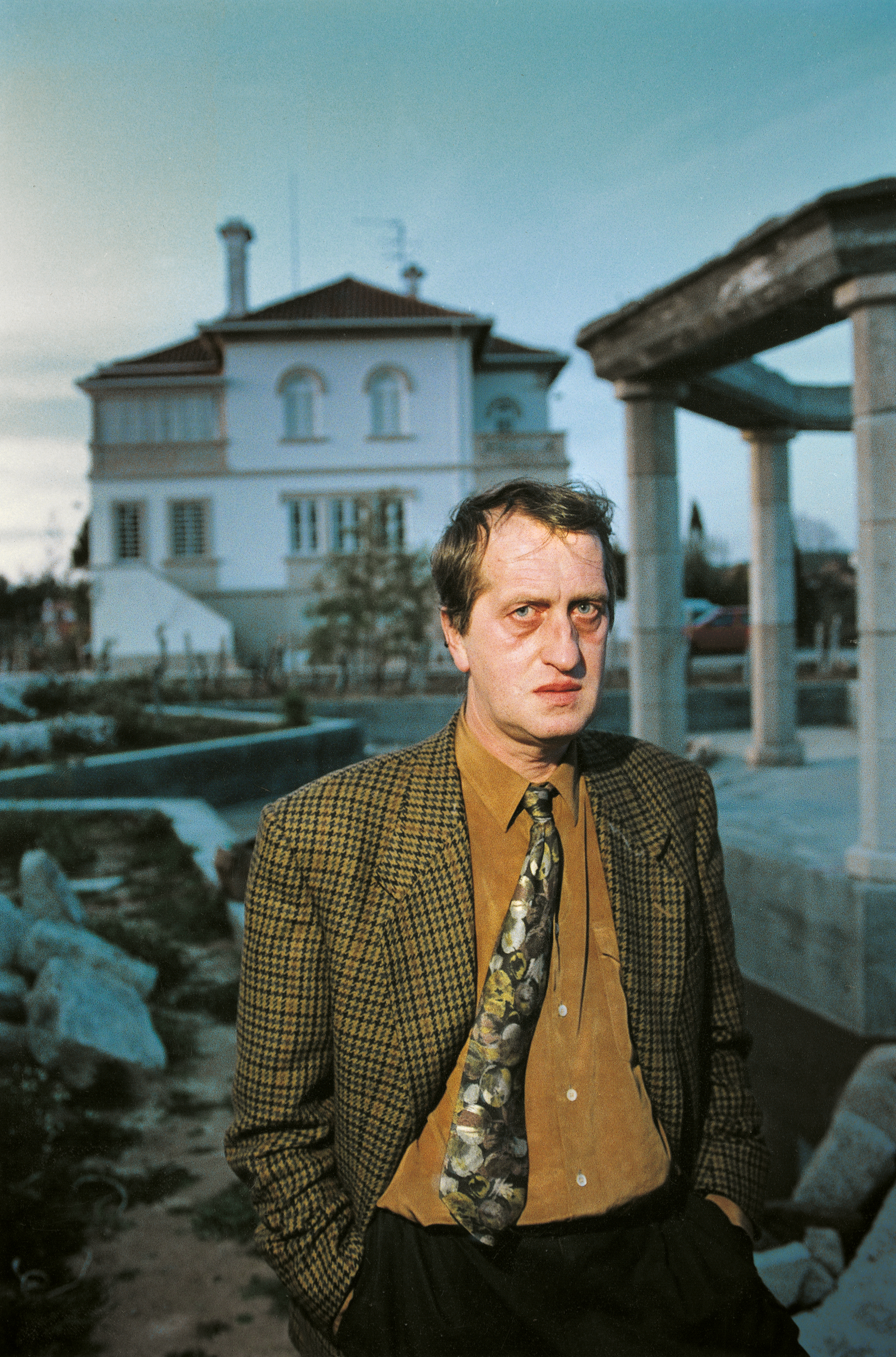
Writer, translator, polemic and critic Gerrit Komrij

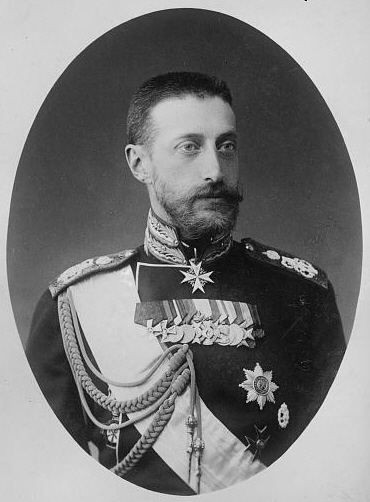
Grand Duke Konstantin Konstantinovich of Russia

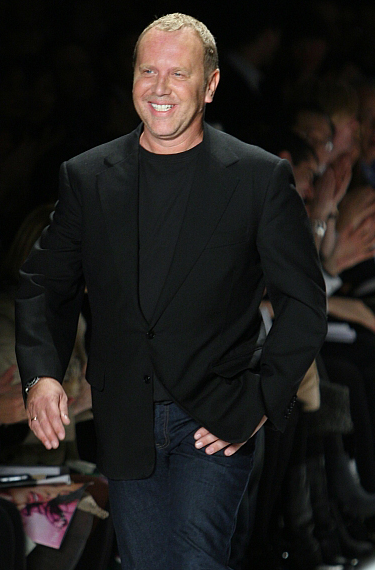
Fashion designer Michael Kors

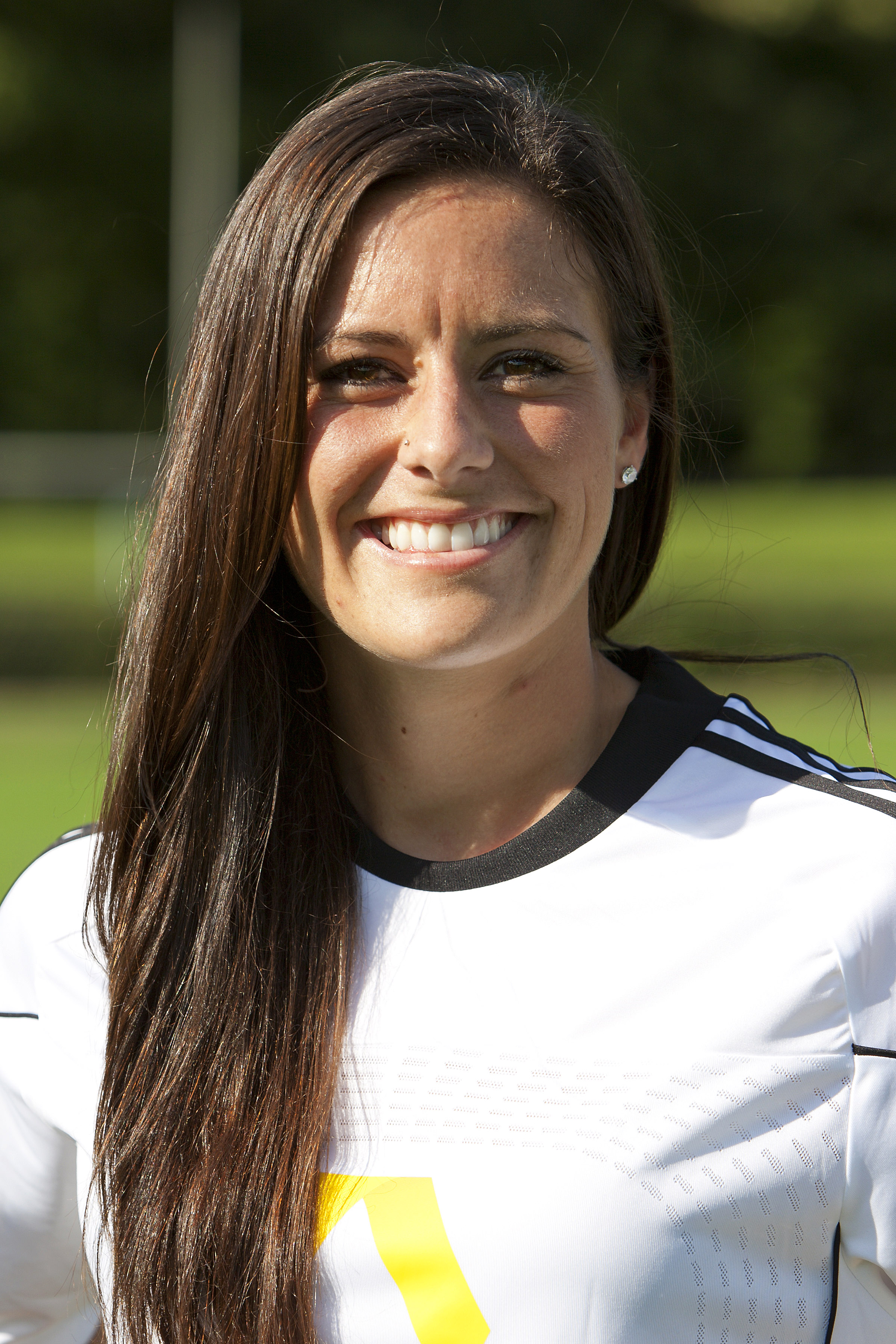
Soccer player Ali Krieger

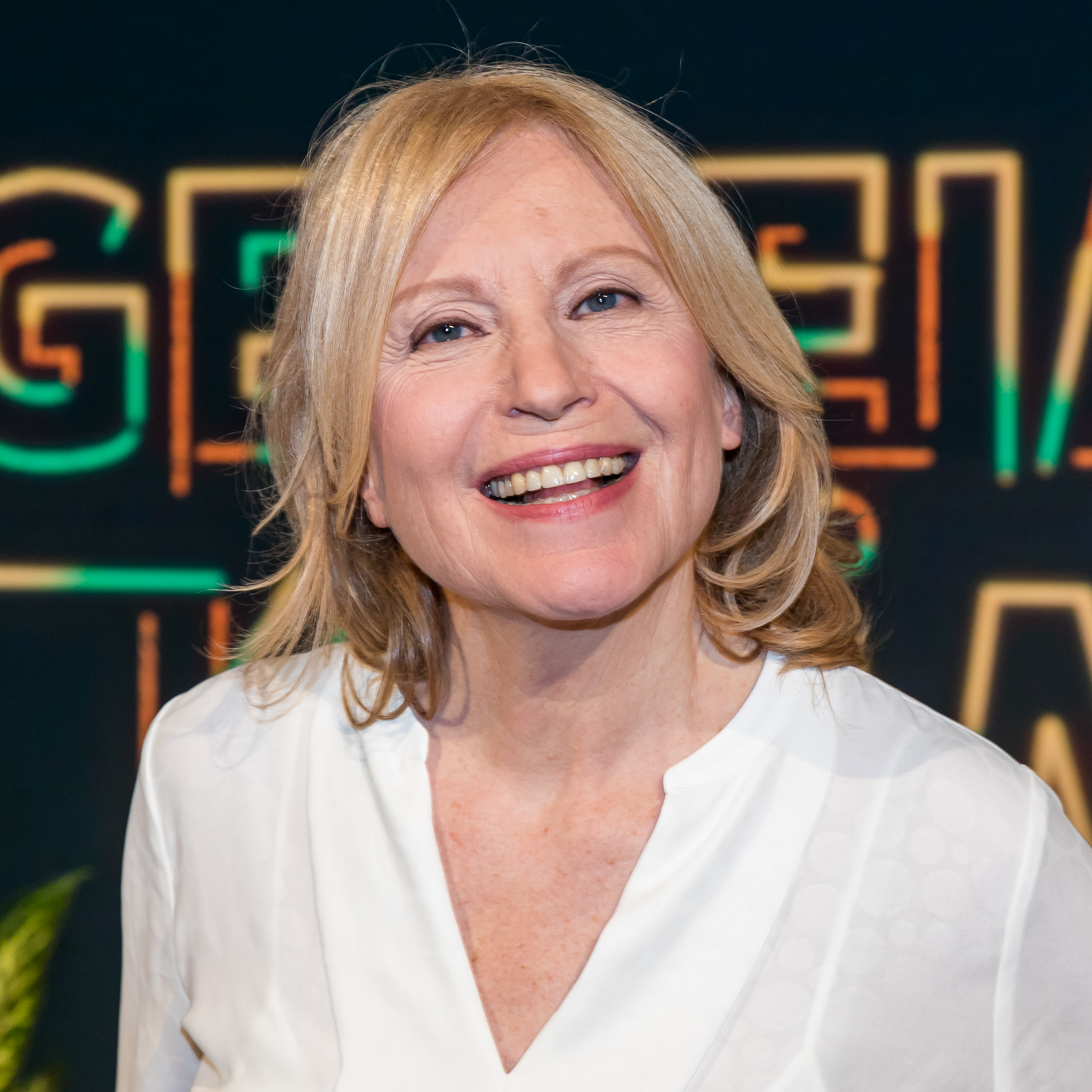
Actress, comedian and singer Maren Kroymann

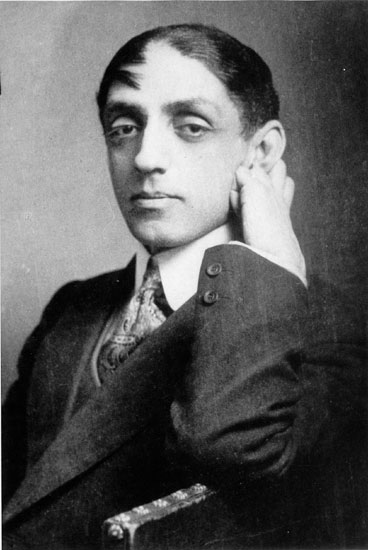
Poet, musician and novelist Mikhail Kuzmin

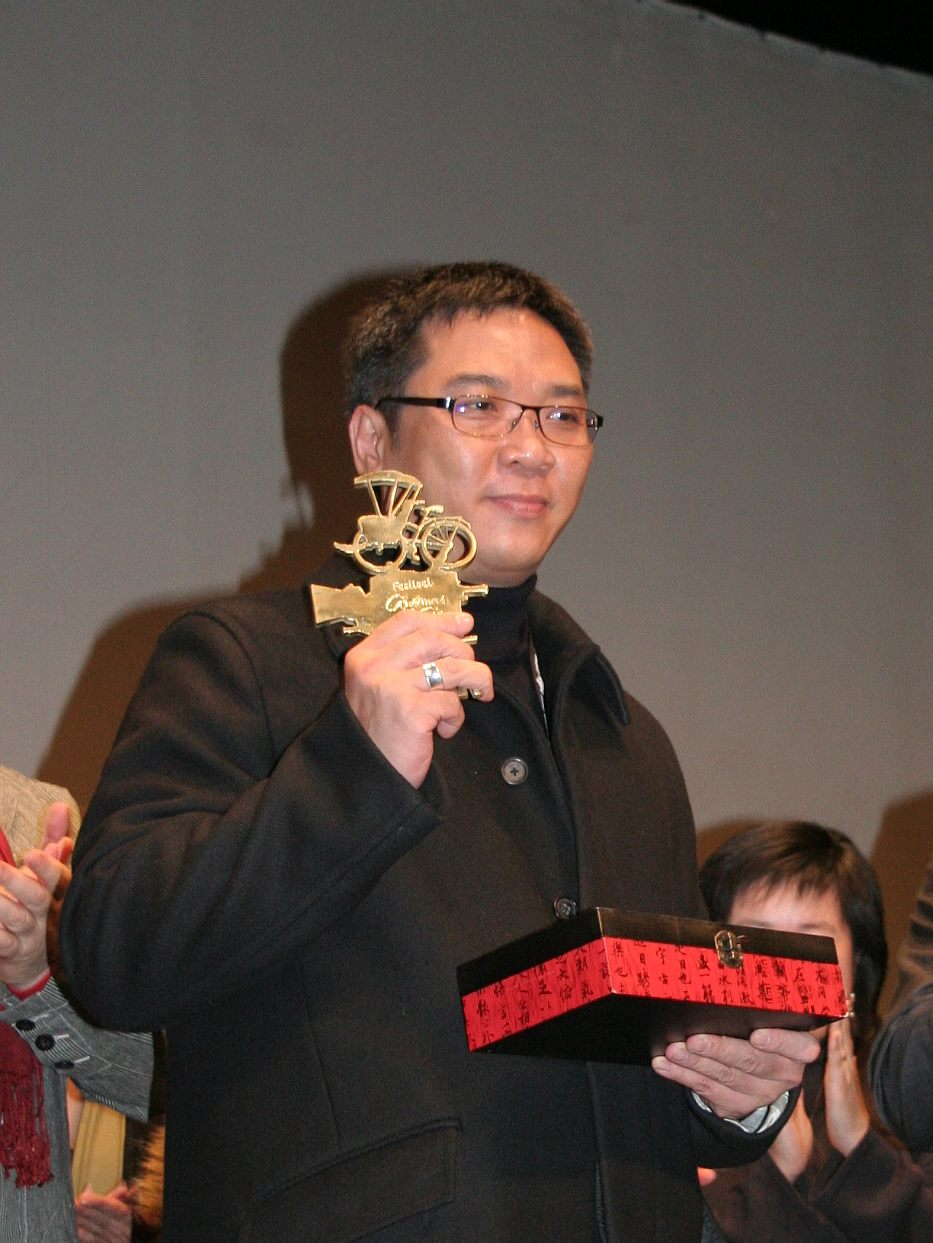
Film director and producer Stanley Kwan

Name	Lifetime	Nationality	Notable as	Notes
Miryam Kabakov	b. 1964	American	Social worker, community organizer	L
Joshua Kadison	b. 1963	American	Pop musician	B
Bart Kaëll	b. 1960	Belgian	Singer, TV personality	G
Kagendo Murungi	1971–2017	Kenyan	LGBT rights activist, filmmaker	L
Rodney Kageyama	1941–2018	American	Actor	G
Frida Kahlo	1907–1954	Mexican	Painter, artist	B
Scott Kahn	b. 1946	American	Painter, printmaker, draughtsman, sculptor	G
Tom Kahn	1938–1992	American	Social democrat	G
Johannes Kahrs	b. 1963	German	Politician	G
Natasha Kai	b. 1983	American	Soccer player	L
Uuno Kailas	1901–1933	Finnish	Poet, author, translator	G
Charles Kaiser	b. 1950	American	Journalist	G
Florina Kaja	b. 1982	American	Reality TV personality	B
Hilda Käkikoski	1864–1912	Finnish	Politician, writer	L
Juba Kalamka	b. 1970	American	Musician	B
Chester Kallman	1921–1975	American	Poet	G
Dick Kallman	1933–1980	American	Actor, antiques art dealer	G
Imri Kalmann	b. 1986	Israeli	Social activist	G
David Kalstone	1933–1986	American	Writer, literary critic	G
Frank Kameny	1925–2011	American	LGBT activist	G
Christian Kampmann	1939–1988	Danish	Author, journalist	B
Lisette Kampus	b. 1984	Estonian	LGBT rights activist	L
Alain Kan	b. 1944	French	Singer	G
Adelaide Kane	b. 1990	Australian	Actor, model	B
Alex Kane	b. 1993	American	Professional wrestler	G
Candye Kane	b. 1965	American	Blues singer, former porn star	B
Sarah Kane	1971–1999	English	Playwright	L
Firdaus Kanga	b. 1960	Indian-British	Writer, actor	G
Arnie Kantrowitz	1940–2022	American	Activist and author	G
Chris Kanyon	1970–2010	American	Professional wrestler	G
Rebecca Kaplan	b. 1970	American	Politician	B or L
Roberta A. Kaplan	b. 1966	American	Litigator	L
Giorgos Kapoutzidis	b. 1972	Greek	Screenwriter, actor	G
Marnix Kappers	1943–2016	Dutch	Actor, TV presenter	G
Maud Kaptheijns	b. 1994	Dutch	Cyclo-cross cyclist	L
Xheni Karaj	b. ?	Albanian	LGBT rights activist, co-founder and executive of the Aleanca LGBT organization	L
Alexander Kargaltsev	b. 1985	Russian-American	Artist, writer, photographer, actor, film director	G
Jiří Karásek ze Lvovic	1871–1951	Czech	Poet, writer, literary critic	G
Fred Karger	b. 1950	American	Political consultant, gay rights activist, actor	G
Pamela S. Karlan	b. 1959	American	Professor of Law	B
JP Karliak	b. 1981	American	Actor, voice actor, comedian	G
Peter Karlsson	1966–1995	Swedish	Ice hockey player	G
Roger Karoutchi	b. 1951	French	Politician	G
Nadezhda Karpova	b. 1995	Russian	Footballer	L
Ferdinand Karsch-Haack	1853–1936	German	Arachnologist, entomologist, sexologist, anthropologist	G
Daria Kasatkina	b. 1997	Russian	Tennis player	L
Dastan Kasmamytov	b. 1991/1992	Kyrgyz	LGBT rights activist	G
Stefanos Kasselakis	b. 1988	Greek	Politician	G
Arundhati Katju	b. 1982	Indian	Lawyer	L
David Kato	c. 1964–2011	Ugandan	LGBT rights activist	G
Carl Katter	b. 1978	Australian	LGBT rights activist, politician	G
Debra Katz	b. 1958	American	Civil rights and employment lawyer	L
Jonathan Ned Katz	b. 1938	American	Historian	G
Zebra Katz	b. 1987	American	Rapper, producer, multimedia artist	G
Michael Kauch	b. 1967	German	Politician	G
Virág Kaufer	b. 1975	Hungarian	Politician	L
Moisés Kaufman	b. 1963	Venezuelan	Playwright, director	G
Christine Kaufmann	b. 1951	American	Politician	L
Kathleen Kauth	b. 1979	American	Ice hockey player	L
Kavana	b. 1977	English	Singer	G
Ashok Row Kavi	b. 1947	Indian	Writer, theologian	G
Abigail Kinoiki Kekaulike Kawānanakoa	1926–2022	Hawaiian-American	Princess, heiress, equestrian, philanthropist	L
Yoshiko Kawashima	1907–1948	Japanese	Spy	B
Daniel Kawczynski	b. 1972	Polish-British	Politician	B
Adam Kay	b. 1980	English	Comedy writer, author, comedian	G
Jackie Kay	b. 1961	Scottish	Writer	L
Gorden Kaye	1941–2017	English	Actor	G
Kaytranada	b. 1992	Haitian-Canadian	Musician	G
Jay Keasling	b. ?	American	Academic administrator, biologist	G
Joe Keenan	b. 1958	American	Screenwriter, TV producer, novelist	G
Andrew Keenan-Bolger	b. 1985	American	Actor, writer, director	G
John Keene	b. 1965	American	Poet, translator, professor, artist	G
Tommy Keene	b. 1957	American	Rock musician	G
Kehlani	b. 1995	American	Singer-songwriter	L
Christine Kehoe	b. 1950	American	Politician	L
Frans Kellendonk	1951–1990	Dutch	Writer, translator	G
Colby Keller	b. 1980	American	Visual artist, blogger, pornographic film actor	G
Hiram Keller	1944–1997	American	Actor	B
Lenn Keller	1951–2020	American	Photographer	L
Lucas Keller	b. 1984	American	Music executive, manager	G
Micah Kellner	b. 1978	American	Politician	B
Bryan Kelly	1934–2026	English	Composer, conductor, pianist	G
Chris Kelly	b. 1983	American	Screenwriter, director	G
Clinton Kelly	b. 1969	American	TV personality	G
Ellsworth Kelly	1923–2015	American	Painter, sculptor, printmaker	G
George Edward Kelly	1887–1974	American	Playwright, director, actor	G
Patrick Kelly	1954–1990	American	Fashion designer	G
Patsy Kelly	1910–1981	American	Actor	L
Erin Kellyman	b. 1981	English	Actor	L
Alev Kelter	b. 1991	American	Rugby sevens player	L
Randall Kenan	1963–2020	American	Writer	G
Rona Kenan	b. 1979	Israeli	Singer	L
Kate Kendell	b. 1960	American	Activist	L
Johan Kenkhuis	b. 1980	Dutch	Swimmer	G
Bill Kennedy	b. 1966	American	Basketball referee	G
Brian Kennedy	d. 1991	English	Journalist	G
Brian Kennedy	b. 1966	Irish	Singer-songwriter, musician	G
Emma Kennedy	b. 1967	English	Actor, writer, TV presenter	L
Helen Kennedy	b. 1958	Canadian	Politician, activist	L
Sean W. Kennedy	1987–2007	American	Murder victim	G
Keala Kennelly	b. 1978	American	Surfer, actor	L
Brian Kenny	b. 1982	American	Artist	G
Jack Kenny	b. 1958	American	TV writer, producer	G
Maurice Kenny	1929–2016	American	Poet	G
Victoria Kent	1897–1987	Spanish	Lawyer, politician	L
Gus Kenworthy	b. 1991	American	Freestyle skier	G
Malcolm Kenyatta	b. 1990	American	State representative of Pennsylvania	G
DJ Keoki	b. 1966	Salvadorean-American	Disc jockey	G
Jim Kepner	1923–1997	American	Archivist	G
Hape Kerkeling	b. 1964	German	Comedian, actor, TV presenter	G
Sanne van Kerkhof	b. 1987	Dutch	Speed skater	L
Johannes Kerkorrel	1960–2002	South African	Pop musician	G
Keith Kerr	b. 1936	American	United States Army officer	G
Sam Kerr	b. 1993	Australian	Association football player	L
J. Warren Kerrigan	1879–1947	American	Actor	G
Larry Kert	1930–1991	American	Actor, singer	G
Karl-Maria Kertbeny	1824–1882	Hungarian-Austrian	Journalist, memoirist, and human rights campaigner (coined terms "heterosexual" and "homosexual")	G
Kesha	b. 1987	American	Singer-songwriter	B
Maryam Keshavarz	b. 1975	American	Film director, screenwriter	B
Hans Kesting	b. 1960	Dutch	Actor	G
Emma Kete	b. 1987	New Zealand	Footballer	L
Maya Keyes	b. 1985	American	Political activist	L
John Maynard Keynes	1883–1946	English	Economist	G
Sarah Keyworth	b. 1993	English	Stand-up comedian	L
Khải Định	1885–1925	Vietnamese	Emperor of the Nguyễn dynasty	G
Khalid	b. 1998	American	Singer	G
Bhupen Khakhar	1934–2003	Indian	Artist	G
El-Farouk Khaki	b. 1963	Canadian	Lawyer and activist	G
Yevgeny Kharitonov	1941–1981	Russian	Actor, writer	G
Elizabeth Khaxas	b. 1960	Namibian	Writer, activist	L
Mohammad Khordadian	b. 1957	Iranian	Dancer, choreographer	G
Rohit Khosla	1958–1994	Indian	Fashion designer	B
Lotte Kiærskou	b. 1975	Danish	Handball player	L
Kid Congo Powers	b. 1959	American	Rock musician, singer (The Gun Club, The Cramps, Nick Cave and the Bad Seeds)	G
Kid Fury	b. 1987	American	YouTube personality, podcaster	G
Chip Kidd	b. 1964	American	Graphic designer	G
Saleem Kidwai	b. 1951	Indian	Author	G
Caitlín R. Kiernan	b. 1964	Irish-American	Author	L
Bandy Kiki	b. 1991	Cameroonian	Blogger, LGBT activist, entrepreneur	L
Siobhán Killeen	b. 1995	Irish	Footballer	L
Ged Killen	b. 1986	Scottish	Politician	G
Kevin Killian	1952–2019	American	Poet, playwright	B
Joel Kim Booster	b. 1988	American	Actor, comedian and writer	G
Kim Jho Gwangsoo	b. 1965	South Korean	Film director	G
Kim Ji-hoo	1985–2008	South Korean	Actor, model	G
Willyce Kim	b. 1946	American	Writer, 1st openly lesbian Asian-American poet published in the U.S.	L
Edd Kimber	b. 1986	English	Reality TV personality; winner of the 2010 Great British Bake Off	G
Ben Kimura	1947–2003	Japanese	Artist	G
Bernard King	1934–2002	Australian	TV personality	G
Billie Jean King	b. 1943	American	Tennis player	B
Diana King	b. 1970	Jamaican	Reggae singer-songwriter	L
Florence King	b. 1936	American	Writer	B
Kaki King	b. 1979	American	Rock and jazz musician	L
Mark S. King	b. 1960	American	HIV/AIDS activist, blogger, writer, and actor	G
Melissa King	b. 1983	American	Chef, TV personality	L
Michael Patrick King	b. 1954	American	Director, screenwriter	G
King Princess	b. 1988	American	Singer-songwriter, musician	L
Shelley King	b. 1955	Indian-British	Actor	L
Solomon King	1932–2005	American	Pop musician	G
Troy King	b. 1968	American	Former Attorney General of Alabama	B
William R. King	1786–1853	American	Politician, diplomat	G
Andrew Kinlochan	b. 1978	English	Pop musician	G
Caitlin Kinnunen	b. 1991	American	Actor	B
Keisuke Kinoshita	1912–1998	Japanese	Film director	G
Alfred Kinsey	1894–1956	American	Biologist, human sexuality researcher	B
Gary Kinsman	b. 1955	Canadian	Sociologist	G
Tamás Király	1952–2013	Hungarian	Avant-garde fashion designer	G
Michael Kirby	b. 1939	Australian	Justice of the High Court of Australia	G
Robert Kirby	b. 1962	American	Cartoonist	G
Tom Kirdahy	b. 1963	American	Theatre producer	G
Kris Kirk	1950–1993	English	Journalist, gay rights activist	G
Tommy Kirk	1941–2021	American	Actor	G
Tim Kirkman	b. 1966	American	Filmmaker	G
James Kirkwood, Jr.	1925–1989	American	Playwright, author	G
Lincoln Kirstein	1907–1996	American	Writer, impresario, philanthropist, co-founder of the New York City Ballet	B
Kirtanananda Swami	1937–2011	American	Hare Krishna guru, racketeer	G
Kristen Kish	b. 1983	American	Chef	L
Rives Kistler	b. 1949	American	Judge	G
Tomasz Kitliński	b. 1965	Polish	Political philosopher, cultural and social analyst, civic activist	G
John Kittmer	b. 1967	English	Diplomat	G
Hayley Kiyoko	b. 1991	American	Singer, actor	L
Stine Brun Kjeldaas	b. 1975	Norwegian	Snowboarder	L
Markus Klaer	1968–2020	German	Politician	G
Radu Klapper	1937–2006	Romanian-Israeli	Poet, author	G
Jeffrey Klarik	b. ?	American	Writer, producer	G
Fritz Klein	1932–2006	Austrian-American	Psychiatrist, LGBT activist	B
Jason Klein	b. ?	American	Rabbi	G
Sharon Kleinbaum	b. 1959	American	Rabbi	L
Irena Klepfisz	b. 1941	Polish-American	Author	L
Rudolf Klimmer	1905–1977	German	Psychologist, sexologist, gay rights activist	G
Hans Klok	b. 1969	Dutch	Illusionist	G
Ilana Kloss	b. 1956	South African	Tennis player	L
Anna Elizabeth Klumpke	1856–1942	American	Portrait and genre painter	L
Nikolai Klyuev	1884–1937	Russian	Poet	G
Steve Kmetko	b. 1953	American	Broadcast journalist	G
Jennifer Knapp	b. 1974	American	Musician	L
Roberta Knie	1938–2017	American	Opera singer	L
Jennie Lea Knight	1933–2007	American	Sculptor	
Jonathan Knight	b. 1968	American	Pop singer (New Kids on the Block)	G
T. R. Knight	b. 1973	American	Actor	G
Belle Knox	b. ?	American	Former pornographic actress, activist	B
Frankie Knuckles	1955–2014	American	DJ, record producer	G
Tamai Kobayashi	b. 1965	Canadian	Writer	L
Olha Kobylianska	1863–1942	Ukrainian	Writer, feminist	B
Cooper Koch	b. 1996	American	Actor	G
Olga Koch	b. 1992	Russian-British	Comedian	B
Igor Kochetkov	b. 1970	Russian	Writer, human rights activist	G
Boris Kochno	1904–1990	Russian	Ballet dancer, poet, librettist	G
Bryan Kocis	1963–2007	American	Porn producer, murder victim	G
Reşad Ekrem Koçu	1905–1975	Turkish	Writer, historian	G
Paul Koering	b. 1964	American	Politician	G
Wayne Koestenbaum	b. 1958	American	Poet and cultural critic	G
Jeffrey Kofman	b. 1959	Canadian	Broadcast journalist	G
Valentina Kogan	b. 1980	Argentine	Handball player	L
Bob Kohler	1926–2007	American	LGBT rights activist	G
Sally Kohn	b. 1977	American	Journalist	L
Irene de Kok	b. 1963	Dutch	Judoka	L
Uri Kokia	b. 1981	Israeli	Basketball player	G
Ilse Kokula	b. 1944	German	Sociologist, author, LGBT activist	L
Chris Kolb	b. 1958	American	Politician	G
Jim Kolbe	1942–2022	American	Politician	G
Dominik Koll	b. 1984	Austrian	Swimmer	G
Helmut Kolle	1899–1931	German	Painter	G
Oswalt Kolle	1928–2010	Dutch-German	Sexologist	B
Debra Kolodny	b. ?	American	Rabbi	B
Gerrit Komrij	1944–2012	Dutch	Poet, novelist, translator, polemic, critic, playwright	G
Harry Kondoleon	1955–1994	American	Dramatist	G
Ralf König	b. 1960	German	Cartoonist	G
Jade Konkel-Roberts	b. 1993	Scottish	Rugby player	L
Grand Duke Konstantin Konstantinovich	1858–1915	Russian	Nobleman, poet	G
Toto Koopman	1908–1991	Dutch-Javanese	Model	B
David Kopay	b. 1942	American	American football player	G
Steve Kornacki	b. 1979	American	Journalist	G
Tinja-Riikka Korpela	b. 1986	Finnish	Footballer	L
Michael Kors	b. 1959	American	Fashion designer	G
Jon Kortajarena	b. 1985	Spanish	Model, actor	G
Zak Kostopoulos	1985–2018	Greek-American	Activist, murder victim	G
Eva Kotchever	1891–1943	Polish	Librarian, writer, lesbian bar owner	L
Tina Kotek	b. 1966	American	Politician	L
Davina Kotulski	b. 1970	American	Psychologist, writer, activist	L
Sofia Kovalevskaya	1850–1891	Russian	Mathematician	B
Kris Kovick	1951–2001	American	Writer, cartoonist	L
Anna Kowalska	1903–1969	Polish	Writer	B
Daniel Kowalski	b. 1975	Australian	Swimmer	G
Dave Koz	b. 1963	American	Jazz musician	G
Kathy Kozachenko	b. ?	American	Politician	L
Vadim Kozin	1903–1994	Russian	Singer	G
Greg Kramer	1961–2013	English-Canadian	Actor	G
Larry Kramer	1935–2020	American	Writer, LGBT activist	G
Vjekoslav Kramer	b. 1976	Bosnian	Chef, media personality	G
Anton Krasovsky	b. 1975	Russian	Political journalist, TV personality, LGBT rights activist	G
Bill Kraus	1947–1986	American	Gay-rights/AIDS activist, congressional aide	G
Bruce Kraus	b. 1954	American	Politician	G
Katja Kraus	b. 1970	German	Footballer	L
Olga Krause	b. 1953	Russian	Poet, singer-songwriter, LGBT rights activist	L
Elmar Kraushaar	b. 1950	German	Journalist, author	G
Reginald Kray	1933–2000	English	Criminal, one half of the Kray twins	B
Ronald Kray	1933–1995	English	Criminal, one half of the Kray twins	G
Levi Kreis	b. 1981	American	Pop musician	G
Carson Kressley	b. 1969	American	TV personality, actor, designer	G
Kelly Kretschman	b. 1979	American	Softball player	L
Marco Kreuzpaintner	b. 1977	German	Film director, screenwriter	G
Nicholas Krgovich	b. 1982	Canadian	musician	G
Ali Krieger	b. 1984	American	Soccer player	L
Henry Krieger	b. 1945	American	Composer	G
Uwe Kröger	b. 1964	German	Singer, musical theater actor	G
John Krokidas	b. 1973	American	Film director, screenwriter, producer	G
Henk Krol	b. 1950	Dutch	Journalist, publisher, entrepreneur, politician	G
Rindert Kromhout	b. 1958	Dutch	Children's writer	G
Lisa Kron	b. 1961	American	Playwright	L
Anne Kronenberg	b. ?	American	Political administrator	L
Maren Kroymann	b. 1949	German	Actor, singer, comedian	L
Emmy Krüger	1886–1976	German	Opera soprano	L
Josh Kruger	1984–2023	American	Journalist, advocate	G
Václav Krška	1900–1969	Czech	Film director, screenwriter	G
Risto Kübar	b. 1983	Estonian	Actor	G
Daniel Küblböck	1985–2018	German	Pop musician, actor	G
Iwona Kuczyńska	b. 1961	Polish	Tennis player	L
Sheila Kuehl	b. 1941	American	Actor, politician	L
Thomas Kufen	b. 1973	German	Politician	G
Michael Kühnen	1955–1991	German	Neo-Nazi leader	G
Kim Kulig	b. 1990	German	Footballer	L
Nancy Kulp	1921–1991	American	Actor	L
Caroline Kumahara	b. 1995	Brazilian	Table tennis player	L
Luksika Kumkhum	b. 1993	Thai	Tennis player	L
Elisar von Kupffer	1872–1942	Baltic German	Artist, writer	G
Marius Kurkinski	b. 1969	Bulgarian	Actor, singer, director	G
Kiyoshi Kuromiya	1943–2000	American	Author, civil rights and anti-war activist, Gay Liberation Front founder	G
Alejandro Kuropatwa	1956–2003	Argentine	Photographer	G
Elvira Kurt	b. 1961	Canadian	Comedian	L
Ellen Kushner	b. 1955	American	Author	L
Tony Kushner	b. 1956	American	Playwright	G
Dmitry Kuzmin	b. 1968	Russian	Poet, critic, publisher	G
Mikhail Kuzmin	1872–1936	Russian	Poet	G
Nataliya Kuznetsova	b. 1991	Russian	World armlifting, bench press and deadlift champion	B
Stanley Kwan	b. 1957	Hong Kong	Film director, producer	G
Michał Kwiatkowski	b. 1983	Polish	Pop singer	G
R.O. Kwon	b. ?	South Korean-American	Novelist	B
Kylie Kwong	b. 1969	Chinese-Australian	TV chef, author, TV presenter, restaurateur	L
Daniel Kyri	b. 1994	American	Actor	G

== See also ==
- List of gay, lesbian or bisexual people
