= Democratic Union (Russia) =

Democratic Union Демократический союз
- Abbreviation: DU (English); ДС (Russian)
- Leader: Valeriya Novodvorskaya
- Founders: Valeriya Novodvorskaya; Yevgeniya Debryanskaya; Sergei Grigoryants
- Founded: 8 May 1988
- Dissolved: 12 July 2014
- Succeeded by: Western Choice
- Headquarters: Moscow
- Newspaper: Free Word
- Ideology: Liberalism; Classical liberalism Reformism; Anti-communism; Anti-fascism; Atlanticism
- Political position: Centre-right
- Colours: White; Blue; Red

Website
- www.ds.ru

Democratic Union (Russian: Демократический союз, romanized: Demokraticheskiy soyuz) was the first official political opposition party in the Soviet Union. It was founded on 8 May 1988 by a group of Soviet dissidents including Valeriya Novodvorskaya, Sergei Grigoryants and Yevgeniya Debryanskaya.

Practical preparation for the first constituent congress of the party was carried out in a country house at the Kratovo station near Moscow, where human rights activist Sergei Grigoryants lived. One of the meetings of the constituent congress was held on the platform of this station. The party gained fame thanks to the full-scale party newspaper Svobodnoye Slovo, which was distributed throughout the USSR, with a weekly circulation in 1991 of 55,000 copies.

The party has become known after a series of unsanctioned demonstrations organized and consistently taking place from 1988 to 1991 in Moscow and Leningrad (Saint Petersburg), with the protesters getting arrested. The party charter specifies the main goals of the organization (among others) as follows:

- Popularization of liberal ideas
- Strengthening the rule of law
- Supporting liberal reforms
- Support and protection of private property
- Fighting against occurrence of communism, nazism, fascism, and socialism.

The main statutory task of the party "liquidation of the totalitarian state" was accomplished in 1991, after which the party's program, tested in political battles, was actually copied by all parties officially registered in the territory of the former USSR.

On 12 July 2014, after the death of the leader of the movement, Valeriya Novodvorskaya, the movement ceased to exist.

== See also ==
- Liberalism in Russia
- List of political parties in the Soviet Union
