= Evgenia Debryanskaya =

Russian activist (born 1953)

- Евгения Дебрянская

Personal details
- Born: 10 June 1953 (age 73) Sverdlovsk Oblast, Russian SFSR, USSR
- Party: Democratic Union, Libertarian Party
- Spouse: Aleksandr Dugin (formerly)
- Children: 1
- Occupation: Entrepreneur; activist

Evgenia Evgenievna Debryanskaya (also transliterated as Yevgenia; Russian: Евгения Евгеньевна Дебрянская; born 10 June 1953, is a Russian dissident and LGBTQ rights activist.

She was also the co-founder of the Osvobozhdenie (Freedom), a radical group that emerged out of the first homosexual movement in Russia and the Democratic Union. Former leader of the Libertarian Party of the RSFSR.

Debryanskaya advocated for the withdrawal of the Soviet army from Eastern Europe, opening of the Russian borders, and the legalization of same-sex marriage. She was also the first wife of Aleksandr Dugin, the Russian political activist, who has been referred to as Vladimir Putin's "Rasputin" by the Milken Institute, as well as "Putin's philosopher", and "Putin's brain". Debryanskaya was called the first "open" lesbian in Russia in a 2008 interview in Ogoniok.

Debryanskaya is also a writer and has directed auteur films.

== Biography ==
Debryanskaya was born on 10 June 1953 in Sverdlovsk Oblast, Soviet Union. She has been described as provincial and uneducated, since she did not finish college. She was, however, wealthy and enjoyed political connections. Her money was attributed to her skill in gambling while she owed her connections to her being the illegitimate daughter of a Moscow Party boss. Prior to living as a lesbian, Debryanskaya was in a heterosexual relationship with Aleksandr Dugin, a Russian philosopher and political agitator. She met him when she was 30 years old. Both were said to have hated the Soviet regime. They married and, in 1985, had a son called Artur Dugin, named in honor of Arthur Rimbaud. Debryanskaya said that she and Dugin were members of the "black order of the SS", a circle of people led by Yevgeny Golovin who studied esoteric fascism and occultism.

=== Activism ===
In 1987, Debryanskaya, Valeriya Novodvorskaya and Sergei Grigoryants co-founded the first official political opposition party in the Soviet Union Democratic Union. However, she was later expelled from the party for "amoral behavior". She was also a member of the Establishment of Trust between East and West.

Debryanskaya helped establish the gay and lesbian rights movement in Russia in the early 1990s. This was possible due to Mikhail Gorbachev's glasnost policy, which lifted some restrictions on the freedom of the press and freedom of expression. With Roman Kalinin and eight others, she founded the Moscow Organization of Sexual Minorities. This organization, later renamed Moscow Gay and Lesbian Union, published Tema, a newspaper that helped advance its goals such as the repeal of Article 21, the law that criminalised consensual homosexual activity. She headed a campaign for the RSFSR Libertarian Party nomination of the one-legged openly-gay Roman Kalinin for the President of Russia. The campaign failed because Kalinin was younger than the minimum age allowed by the Constitution of Russia.

With Masha Gessen, she founded "Triangle" the organization supporting Russian lesbians. It was named after Pink triangle, a Nazi concentration camp badge identifying prisoners as gay.

One of her notable initiatives was the organization of a controversial pride parade in Moscow, which drew international attention to sexual minorities in the city. This was announced with Nikolay Alexeyev on 27 July 2005. The first-ever pride parade occurred a year later on 27 May 2006, ending in violence. About 200 activists were arrested, including Debryanskaya and Alexeyev. She was also involved with movie screenings, press conferences and discussions.

Debryanskaya wrote and directed auteur films. Several of her initiatives were supported by international funding and, when these sources dwindled, nightclub owners.

Later in life, Debryanskaya became an entrepreneur. She owned a lesbian bar called Dietrich, which was stolen by Maksim Kozlouvskiy, her landlord. In December 2015, Kozlouvskiy warned everyone to leave the club to avoid an imminent police raid. Debryanskaya gave the keys to Kozlouvskiy and fled, but no police came. The landlord took over the establishment, saying it would be converted into a "natural nightclub".
