= Irina Fedotova =

Irina Fedotova may refer to:

- Irina Fedotova (model), Russian model, artist and fashion designer
- Irina Fedotova (rower), Russian Olympic athlete
- Irina Fedotova (activist), Russian human rights activist

== See also ==
- Irina Fedorova (disambiguation)
