= Philadelphia Weekly =

Newspaper in Philadelphia, Pennsylvania

- The logo of Philadelphia Weekly
- Type: Alternative weekly
- Format: Tabloid
- Owner(s): Philadelphia Weekly Holdings, Ltd.
- Publisher: Michael Dahler
- Founded: 1971
- Headquarters: 1701 E Cathedral Rd, Ste 45 PMB 445; Philadelphia, Pennsylvania 19128 United States
- Circulation: 100,893
- Website: philadelphiaweekly.com

Philadelphia Weekly (PW) is a website based in Philadelphia, Pennsylvania. It was founded as a newspaper in 1971 as The Welcomat, a sister publication to the South Philadelphia Press. In 1995, the paper became Philadelphia Weekly. The paper features stories on local and national politics, as well extensive coverage of the arts – music, film, theater and the visual arts.

From 1986 to 2015, the paper was owned by Review Publishing, along with sister publication South Philly Review. In 2015, both papers were sold to Broad Street Media, parent of the Northeast Times. In 2016, Richard Donnelly, president of New Jersey–based distribution company Donnelly Distribution, acquired Broad Street Media and its affiliates. Donnelly formed Newspaper Media Group.

In late 2018, self-described "American Capitalist" Dan McDonough Jr. acquired Philadelphia Weekly. By late 2020, the publication announced a switch in editorial stance to conservative, which was considered unnatural for an urban alternative weekly. The announcement put forth the claim that voices on the right are no longer being published in the city, and to be a truly alternative publication, the weekly must give those voices a platform.

In late 2021, McDonough sold the publication to an undisclosed media company in Puerto Rico.

In early 2022, Josh Kruger was hired as editor in chief, to bring back a more progressive editorial position. Kruger had written, from 2013 to 2016, for both the Philadelphia Weekly and the rival City Paper consecutively. He stated that since the Philadelphia Weekly owns the intellectual rights of the defunct City Paper, he would revive some features from that publication. The publication moved to digital-only publication in 2022.

== Weekly features ==
Topics updated weekly include: News, Arts, Music, Opinion, Food/Drink, People, Sports, "Sex with Timaree", LGBTQ, Betting/Casino, a "What to Do" Calendar, and an article written by the editor.

== See also ==
- Alternative weekly
- Philadelphia City Paper
