= Irina Fedorova =

Irina Fedorova may refer to:

- Irina Victorovna Fedorova, Russian Antarctic scientist
- Irina Konstantinovna Feodorova, Soviet historian

== See also ==
- Irina Fedotova (disambiguation)
- Fedorov
