= Bulletin "V" =

Soviet samizdat periodical (1980–1983)

Bulletin "V" (Russian: Бюллетень В) was a Samizdat human rights publication produced in Russian and circulated in the Soviet Union in 1980–1983. Samizdat was a form of dissident activity across the socialist Eastern Bloc in which individuals reproduced censored and underground makeshift publications, often by hand, passing the documents from reader to reader. This grassroots approach to evading official Soviet censorship was dangerous, as people caught with censored materials were frequently subject to harsh punishments.

== Production ==
“V" stands for the first letter of the Russian word "vesti" (“news"). The bulletin was a typewritten publication produced in limited 'runs' of copies. In 3 years, 105 issues were produced in total. The authors of Bulletin "V" intended to provide information on the human rights situation in the USSR for further reference and dissemination by other human rights publications and groups, such as "Chronicle of Current Events" (circulated in 1968–1983) and the Moscow Helsinki Group in the Soviet Union and the "News from the USSR" (circulated in 1978–1991) in Munich.

Bulletin “V" recorded human right abuses in the Soviet Union, provided information on recent trials and on the condition of political prisoners in the places of confinement. It also reported on new developments in the human rights movement in the Soviet Union. Bulletin "V' today provides a valuable source for those working on documenting the history of the human rights movement in the Soviet Union.

Since the spring of 1984, another the Bulletin editions, entitled "+" started to circulate, with the issues numbered "+1", "+2", etc. The "+" bulletin was a continuation of the Bulletin "V", but contained solely primary and "raw' information. It circulated until the summer of 1986.

An almost complete set of Bulletin “V" is available in the holdings of the Vera and Donald Blinken Open Society Archives, as part of the Radio Free Europe/Radio Liberty (RFE/RL) Samizdat Archives. The issues of bulletin “V" obtained by the RFE/RL were partly smuggled to RFE/RL from the Soviet Union (no. 101, 103, 106 and the issues of 1983), and partly were donated by Vladimir Tol’ts, who worked for the Russian service at the radio. When distributed to RFE/RL, Bulletin “V" was not reproduced as a whole, though many documents from the bulletin were included in the widely circulated bulletin “Materialy Samzidata" of 1971–1991.

== See also ==
- Chronicle of Current Events
