= Roman Kalinin (activist) =

Russian gay rights activist

- Born: 1966 (age 59–60); Soviet Union (now Russian Federation)
- Occupations: Entrepreneur; activist

Roman Kalinin (born 1966) is a Russian gay rights activist. He was the publisher of TEMA, Russia's first gay and lesbian newspaper. Kalinin is noted for his contribution to fighting the attempted Soviet coup in August 1991. Kalinin is also an HIV/AIDS advocate and an entrepreneur.

== Biography ==
Kalinin rose to national prominence at a young age. When he was 24, he became the co-founder of the Moscow Union of Lesbians and Homosexuals (MULH). When this organization was introduced through an international press conference in 1990, Kalinin, who was then a young student, and Evgenia Debryanskaya were the only members to state their full names, effectively making them the first "out" queers in Russia. The alliance also began publishing TEMA (The Theme), which was established to help the goal of complete equality for people with different sexual orientation. It was the first explicitly gay-themed magazine in Russia. The inability to hold a constructive dialogue with authorities led to the split in the MULH organization into the radical and moderate wings. After this development, Kalinin became TEMA's sole editor and publisher.

Kalinin was the candidate of the RSFSR Libertarian Party for the Russian Federation's June 1991 presidential elections. Some sources say his candidacy was intended as a joke but he was taken seriously in Russia and was disqualified on account of his age.

During the August 1991 Soviet coup, Kalinin and his fellow activists worked against the takeover by printing and distributing Boris Yeltsin's decrees. He first got wind of the plan on August 18 from sources in San Francisco. According to an account by U.S. House Speaker Nancy Pelosi, aside from his role in stopping the coup, Kalinin also warned gays and lesbians in the Soviet Union who would immediately become targets of persecution because of their sexual preference during the power grab. Together with Debryanskaya, Kalinin was invited by the Stonewall Foundation and the Gay and Lesbian Alliance Against Defamation to tour the United States. During this time, he was named Man of the Year by the journal, The Advocate. According to the issue of the magazine, Kalinin's works cleared the path for many Soviet lesbians and gay men to come out.

Kalinin was also an AIDS advocate. He exposed the violence of the legal repressions of people suffering from the disease. In several publications, he detailed how the police and the KGB were involved in the surveillance and blackmail of those who were HIV positive. His initiatives and public actions were designed to attract attention. He once led a group that distributed condoms to the delegates of the 28th Communist Party Congress in the drive to advance AIDS prevention.

In 1993, Kalinin opened Underground, which catered to a queer clientele. It was located near the Kremlin and, unlike its predecessors such as the discreet Kafe Sadko, the Underground was the first openly and expressly gay bar in Russia. The success of this bar paved the way for similar establishments to open in Moscow by 1995.
