= Sergei Grigoryants =

Russian human rights activist (1941–2023)

- Сергей Григорьянц; Сергій Григор'янц
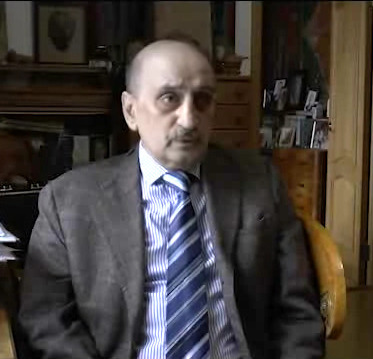
- Sergei Grigoryants in 2015
- Born: 12 May 1941; Kyiv, Ukrainian SSR, Soviet Union
- Died: 14 March 2023 (aged 81); Moscow, Russia
- Citizenship: Soviet Union (1941–1991), Russia (1991–2023)
- Education: Moscow State University, Kyiv Polytechnic Institute, Riga Civil Aviation Engineers Institute
- Occupations: Aerospace engineering, journalism, literary criticism, human rights activism, publishing
- Known for: publishing Glasnost magazine, chairing the Glasnost Defense Foundation
- Movement: Dissident movement in the Soviet Union
- Awards: World Association of Newspapers' Golden Pen of Freedom Award
- Website: grigoryants.ru

Sergei Ivanovich Grigoryants (Russian: Серге́й Ива́нович Григорья́нц, Ukrainian: Сергі́й Іва́нович Григор'я́нц, 12 May 1941 – 14 March 2023) was a Soviet dissident and political prisoner, journalist, literary critic, chairman of the Glasnost Defense Foundation. He was imprisoned for ten years in Chistopol jail as a political prisoner for anti-Soviet activities, from 1975 to 1980 and then four more years starting in 1983 on similar charges.

== Biography ==
Sergei Grigoryants was born on 12 May 1941 in Kyiv (then Kiev) in the Ukrainian SSR of the Soviet Union (USSR). He was of Armenian-Ukrainian descent. Grigoryants studied at the Kyiv Polytechnic Institute, the faculty of journalism at the Moscow State University and the Riga Civil Aviation Engineers Institute (at the time all these cities were located inside the USSR).

In 1975, Grigoryants was arrested by the KGB and sentenced to five years in prison for anti-Soviet agitation and propaganda.

After his release in 1982, he circulated in samizdat information on human rights violations in the Soviet Union as editor of the periodical Bulletin V. For this activity, he was again arrested in 1984 and sentenced to ten years of strict regime labor camp.

After the beginning of General Secretary of the Communist Party of the Soviet Union Mikhail Gorbachev's perestroika, he was released in 1987 under amnesty. He immediately resumed his human rights activities and proceeded to publish Glasnost magazine, criticizing the communist system.

In May 1989 Grigoryants created and headed the union of independent journalists, which included a number of journalists representing independent (samizdat) printed in the USSR.

In 1989, Grigoryants was awarded Golden Pen of Freedom Award of the World Association of Newspapers.

In the 1990s he regularly voiced his demands for lustration, filed a lawsuit against the KGB, demanded to return his confiscated archive.

Grigoryants was in opposition to Russian president Vladimir Putin's policies, in particular, he expressed protests against the infringement of democratic freedoms in Russia and criticized the government for the war in Chechnya.

In 2014, Grigoryants condemned Russian aggression against Ukraine and even filed a complaint to the International Court of Justice demanding President Putin's trial.

Grigoryants died in Moscow at the age of 82 on 14 March 2023. He was buried next to his son at the city's Medvedkovskoe cemetery.

== Articles ==
- Grigoryants, Sergei (23 February 1988). "Soviet psychiatric prisoners" (PDF). The New York Times. p. A31. Archived (PDF) from the original on 9 December 2011.
- Grigoryants, Sergei (January 1989). "Camps with guards in white gowns: thousands of Mengeles, millions of victims". Glasnost (16–18): 34–35.
- Grigoryants, Sergei (1989). "Political samizdat in Moscow". Uncaptive Minds. 2 (5): 46–57.
- Grigoryants, Sergei (2001). "Мы были внутренне не готовы" [We were internally not ready]. Index on Censorship (in Russian) (13).
- Grigoryants, Sergei (2001). "Прощание: гибель правозащитного демократического движения в России" [Farewell: the death of human rights democratic movement in Russia]. Index on Censorship (in Russian) (16).
