= Film d'auteur =

Type of film

Film d'auteur (also called cinéma d'auteur) is an expression used to describe the films of a film director or a screenwriter which reflect their artistic personality. This term is primarily used to link a filmmaker's body of work to their preferred themes and to highlight the coherence of their innovative and distinctive style. However, it is a subjective designation with no strict definition. It is often associated with art house cinema or experimental cinema.

== Origin ==
The notion of film d'auteur was born in France in the 1950s when critics, influenced by the theories of Louis Delluc, Alexandre Astruc and André Bazin, who went on to constitute the French Nouvelle Vague – notably François Truffaut – called for a cinema breaking the academicism of their elders (for example Jean Delannoy and Claude Autant-Lara) and were inspired by American filmmakers such as Alfred Hitchcock, Howard Hawks and John Ford. In an article of the Cahiers du cinéma of 1955 in which he evokes Ali Baba by Jacques Becker, Truffaut defines the theoretical concept of "politique des auteurs" which consists of studying a film as the continuation of the aesthetic choices of a filmmaker and not as an entirely separate work, attributable to a precise genre or story. Consequently, being an auteur means that the director has full authority over their own films. They overcome technical constraints in order to define their own style. The auteur is therefore, according to Truffaut, someone who weaves original, unique motifs into their works. This concept, dominant in French critical discourse since the 1960s, makes the director the sole creator, sidelining the screenwriter or co-screenwriter, producer, and technical team. This vision is contested or even rejected since the 1990s, notably by the French-American critic Noël Burch who judges it to be too limited and uniquely focused on form.

In Germany, film d'auteur is represented especially by the New German Cinema movement (Rainer Werner Fassbinder, Werner Herzog, Wim Wenders, etc.). According to them, the director must imprint their vision and their style in their work, just like a writer in the field of literature – the metaphor of the "camera-pen". The film must therefore be considered the work of an author rather than a simple entertainment product manufactured by the Hollywood "dream factory". The term "auteur" is used today in English to designate directors who have a style of their own or a distinctive vision.

In the United Kingdom, the idea of film d'auteur was also born in the 1950s with the critic-filmmakers of the review Sequence, admirers of the work of Jean Vigo and Jacques Prévert and close to the Jeunes gens en colère. Karel Reisz, Lindsay Anderson and Tony Richardson, founders of Free cinema, call for the re-founding of a cinema that breaks with the conventional workmanship of the majority of British productions. The productions derived from it seek to be more authentic, singular and anchored in a certain social reality. When Free Cinema was launched in 1956, Reisz declared: "We work outside the habitual framework of the industry and we have in common social concerns which we try to express in our films." The auteur is therefore an independent creator defined by their commitment and the sharpness of their outlook on society.

In Eastern Europe, some young auteurs, recognized in the international sphere for their innovative style or the accuracy of their social observation, began to emerge in the 1960s with the temporary easing of governance in some Communist states and the relative loosening of censorship committees (New Czechoslovak Wave, New Polish Cinema, etc.).

In the United States at the end of the 1960s, the filmmakers of the new generation recognized themselves in the concept of auteur as defined by Truffaut and profited off the financial crisis within large studios to take power there and put themselves at the center of the conception and production of films, a position they had previously been deprived of. The directors of the New Hollywood claimed total authority over the cinematographic works that they shaped the artistic point of view of. Thus, they seek to assert the coherence of their style.

In Denmark in the 1990s, a radical process of re-founding film d'auteur was undertaken by the creators of Dogme95.

== Definition ==
The genre to which a film d'auteur belongs implies a certain control of the filmmaker over their film from an artistic and dramatic point of view, considering in particular that a film can only be a film d'auteur if the director has control of the final edit. For many critics, an auteur prioritizes themself above all else in their own personal universe. The auteur's signature is immediate and is detected, for example, in the type of story or characters favored, the choice of recurring actors, or the aesthetic options repeated from one film to another (light, frame, sound design, transitions, camera movements, etc.). An auteur thus stays faithful to themself but can take their work in new directions. A simplified vision of auteur cinema tends to consider that the director must also be the screenwriter, without which they could not claim complete ownership of the work. According to another restrictive representation, a film d'auteur must be an independent film, experimental or difficult to access, and produced outside the system of studios and commissioned works. Such a film would be in opposition to the "Cinéma de Genre" films that use a coded structure and conform to the norms of commercial exploitation. This conception of auteur cinema, however, can seem paradoxical since certain filmmakers qualified as auteurs have filmed some genre films, for example science-fiction films (Alphaville by Jean-Luc Godard, Fahrenheit 451 by François Truffaut) or detective films (Police by Maurice Pialat). Note that these auteurs have often had success and were financed or distributed by majors like Gaumont for Truffaut, Godard, Pialat, and André Téchiné.

== Current usage ==
In the media for the general public, the film d'auteur is frequently opposed to "cinéma commercial", the first being considered demanding, intellectual, elitist and with a reduced budget while the second is destined for the greatest number or claims to be familial, entertaining, and is produced with significant resources. For certain critics, the concept of film d'auteur takes on a qualitative value and becomes a label. Conversely, for some viewers, film d'auteur evokes an austere and boring type of art film.

== Criticism ==
The term "auteurisme" is sometimes used, notably by Noël Burch, to qualify the ensemble of what he judges to be the downward slide of auteur films (especially French): falsely demanding attitudes, clichés and visual tics linked to a modernism, a hermeticism and a lazy formalism, openly disdaining the script. In its December 2012 issue, Les Cahiers du cinéma proposed a certain number of measures to counter the "ten flaws" of contemporary auteur cinema that it lists and defines (cult of the master, seriousness of a priest, interchangeable actors, non-scenes of montage, etc.).

== Related festivals ==
Certain festivals specialize in films d'auteur. The Festival international du film francophone de Namur (the FIFF) is dedicated to films d'auteur from the French-speaking world. For another example, the international festival of film d'auteur of Rabat seeks to highlight independent auteurs. In addition, the biggest international film festivals like Cannes, Venice, Berlin, Locarno, and San Sebastian do not hide their intention to enhance the value, through their selections, of cinéma d'auteur, cinéma d'art et d'essai (art house cinema), and cinéma de recherche ("research/exploratory cinema").

== See also ==
- Independent film
- Experimental film
- Politique des auteurs
- Vulgar auteurism
- Cinema of France

=== External links ===
- Cinéphiles en France
- History of French Cinema
