= Fedotova and Others v. Russia =

2021 case before the European Court of Human Rights

Decided 13 July 2021
- Case: 40792/10, 30538/14 and 43439/14
- Chamber: Third
- Language of proceedings: English
- Nationality of parties: Russian

Ruling
- Violation of Article 8
- President; Paul Lemmens
- Judges: Georgios A. Serghides; Dmitry Dedov; María Elósegui; Anja Seibert-Fohr; Peeter Roosma; Andreas Zünd

Instruments cited
- European Convention on Human Rights

Case opinions
- Majority: Lemmens, joined by Serghides, Dedov, Elósegui, Seibert-Fohr, Roosma
- Concurrence: Zünd, joined by Lemmens

Fedotova and Others v. Russia (application numbers 40792/10, 30538/14 and 43439/14) was a case submitted by six Russian nationals to the European Court of Human Rights (ECtHR).

The case was decided on 13 July 2021 when the Third Chamber ruled unanimously that Russia's refusal to provide any legal recognition to same-sex couples violated the applicants' human rights under Article 8 of the European Convention on Human Rights.

Following the decision, the Russian government requested on 12 October 2021 that the case be referred to the Grand Chamber of the Court. The referral was accepted by the court on 22 November 2021. The Grand Chamber upheld the ruling on 17 January 2023. By this time, Russia had already been expelled by the Council of Europe due to the invasion of Ukraine and had ceased to be part of the European Convention on Human Rights.

== Background ==
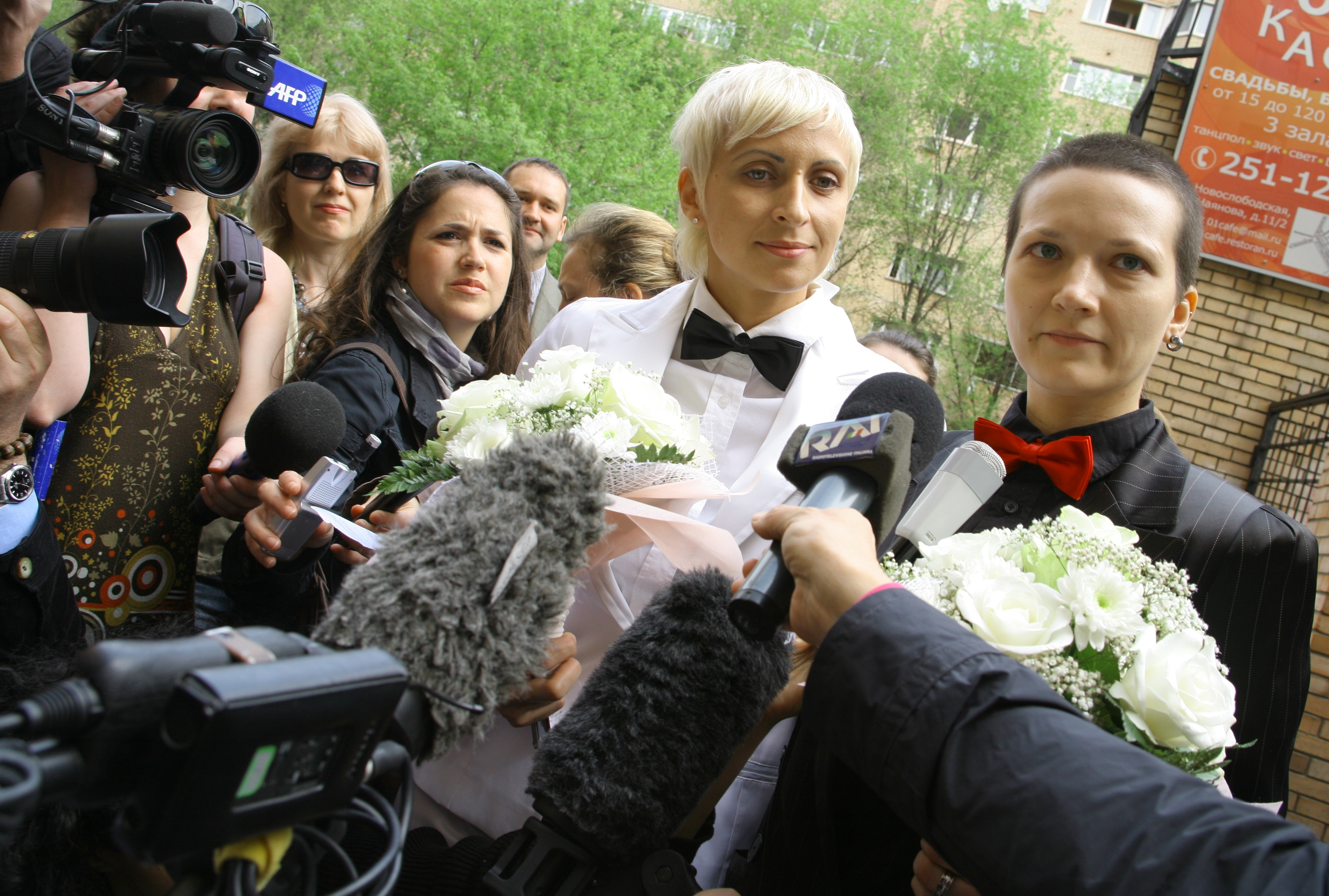
Irina Fedotova at her marriage ceremony in Moscow in 2009

The ECtHR has previously addressed same-sex relationships. In 2010, in the case Schalk and Kopf v. Austria, same-sex couples were recognized as a family unit but there was no obligation on Austria to legally recognize their relationship. In 2013, Vallianatos and Others v. Greece, the court found it was discriminatory for Greece to recognize opposite-sex partnerships but not same-sex ones. In the 2015 case Oliari and Others v. Italy the court found that Italy's lack of any form of legal recognition for same-sex couples breached the applicants' human rights. However, Oliari included elements that reduced its generalizability to other Council of Europe countries.

The case Fedotova and Others reached the ECtHR through joining three separate applications filed by six Russian nationals who lived in same-sex relationships, the first filed by Irina Fedotova and her partner Irina Shipitko in 2010. The other couples, Mr D. Chunusov and Mr Y. Yevtushenko and Ms I. Shaykhraznova and Ms Y. Yakovleva, filed their cases with the ECtHR in 2014. The couples attempted to obtain marriage licenses but were refused. They did not make a complaint under Article 12 of the European Convention on Human Rights, the right to marriage, but rather Article 8, which protects private and family life, as well as Article 14, which prohibits discrimination in the exercise of Convention rights.

== Decision ==
The Third Chamber ruled on 13 July 2021 that Russia "had an obligation to ensure respect for the applicants' private and family life by providing a legal framework allowing them to have their relationships acknowledged," and it rejected the Russian government's argument about public disapproval of same-sex unions, finding that "access to rights for a minority could not be dependent on the acceptance of the majority."

Referring to the 2020 amendments to the Constitution of Russia which define marriage as a legal union of one man and one woman, the court stated that Russia could give same-sex couples "access to formal acknowledgment of their couples' status in a form other than marriage" which would not conflict with the "traditional understanding on marriage" that prevails in Russia.

The Grand Chamber upheld the ruling of the Third Chamber on 17 January 2023. It held by fourteen votes to three, that there had been a violation of Article 8 (right to respect for private and family life) of the European Convention on Human Rights.

== Reactions ==
After the initial 2021 Third Chamber decision, the chairman of the State Duma, Vyacheslav Volodin, suggested that the ECtHR judges should resign because of the decision. Dmitri Bartenev, one of Fedotova's lawyers, wrote after the verdict in 2021 that it was unlikely Russia would implement it, but that it was possible to do so without any constitutional changes. The head of Russia's delegation to the Parliamentary Assembly of the Council of Europe (PACE), Pyotr Tolstoy, said that Russia would not leave the Council of Europe without a "more serious cause". However, in 2022, Russia, having been expelled from the Council of Europe on 16 March 2022 due to the 2022 Russian invasion of Ukraine, ceased to be a party to the ECHR on 16 September 2022 in accordance with article 58.

At Oxford Human Rights Hub, Stephanos Stavros commented that the judgement "appears to capitalise on the respondent Government's reluctance to mount a real defence" and hypothesizes that it might represent a return to a more activist approach by the court. In Völkerrechtsblog, Eva Maria Bredler regretted that the court did not consider Article 14, which prohibits discrimination in the exercise of Convention rights. However, she stated that pending cases filed by same-sex couples against Poland would give the court a chance to elaborate on Article 14, e.g. Andersen v. Poland. Natalia Zviagina, director of Amnesty International's Moscow office, said that the "landmark decision underlines that the Russian government is on the wrong side of history".
