= Irina Fedotova (activist) =

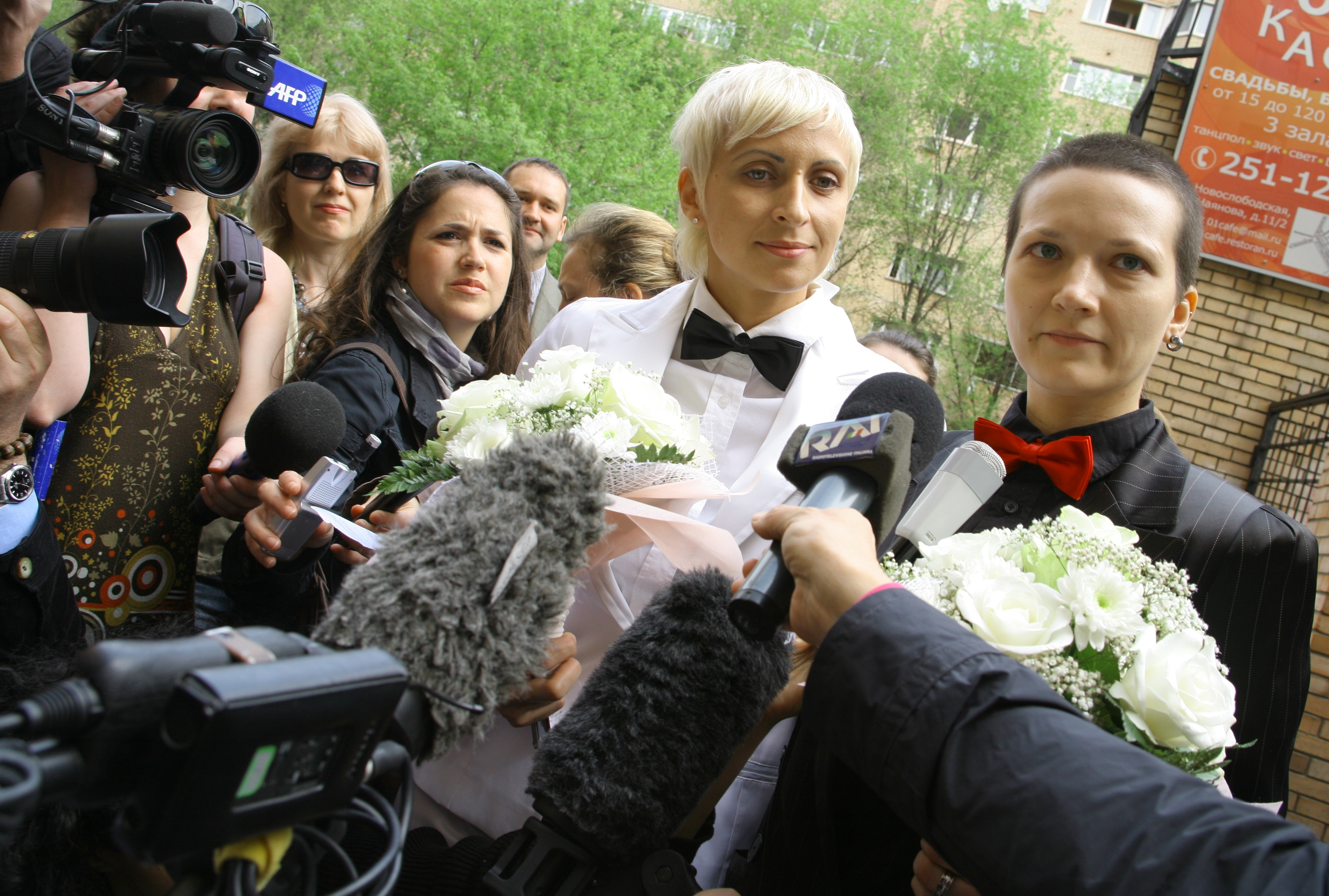
Fedotova at her marriage ceremony in Moscow, 2009

Irina Fedotova is a Russian LGBT and human rights activist. She filed the case Fedotova and Others v. Russia (1932/2010) with the United Nations Human Rights Committee to challenge the gay propaganda law in Ryazan and also the case Fedotova and Others v. Russia with the European Court of Human Rights, which ruled in 2021 that Russia had violated her rights by failing to provide any recognition to her same-sex relationship.
