= Josh Kruger =

American journalist and advocate (1984–2023)

Josh Kruger (August 21, 1984 – October 2, 2023) was an American journalist and advocate. As a journalist, he wrote for publications like The Philadelphia Inquirer, Philadelphia Magazine, the Philadelphia Citizen, and the Philly Voice about LGBT rights, addiction, AIDS, and homelessness.

== Career ==
Kruger moved to Philadelphia in 2002 to attend the University of Pennsylvania, where he studied political science and anthropology. Following this, he worked in community development and local non-profits for five years. He won the Society of Professional Journalists' award for newspaper commentary in Pennsylvania in 2014 and 2015.

Kruger worked in Philadelphia's city government between 2016 and 2021, both as a content creator and social media manager for the mayor, and as a communications director for the Office of Homeless Services. He left in 2021 to return to journalism.

== Personal life ==
Kruger had previously struggled with addiction to crystal meth and intravenous drugs. He was homeless for a time, and drew on this and his addictions in his writing and activism. He was diagnosed as HIV-positive in his late 20s, and wrote about the need for accessible treatments for those with the condition. He was a member of St. Mark's Episcopal Church on Locust Street in Philadelphia.

== Death and legacy ==
On October 2, 2023, Kruger was shot in the torso seven times while inside of his home in South Philadelphia. He was subsequently rushed to a hospital, where he was pronounced dead the same day.

Multiple public officials memorialized him, including both of the state's U.S. Senators John Fetterman and Bob Casey Jr., as well as District Attorney of Philadelphia Larry Krasner.

On October 6, police announced they had identified 19-year-old Robert Edmond Davis as a suspect in Kruger's death.

Davis, according to his family, was in a drug-involved relationship with Kruger since Davis was 15 years old and Kruger was 35. Davis' family stated that he told them Kruger was threatening to post sexually explicit videos of him online. In June 2024, Davis pleaded guilty to third-degree murder and was sentenced to 15–30 years in prison.
