= Olga Krause =

Russian poet and activist (born 1953)

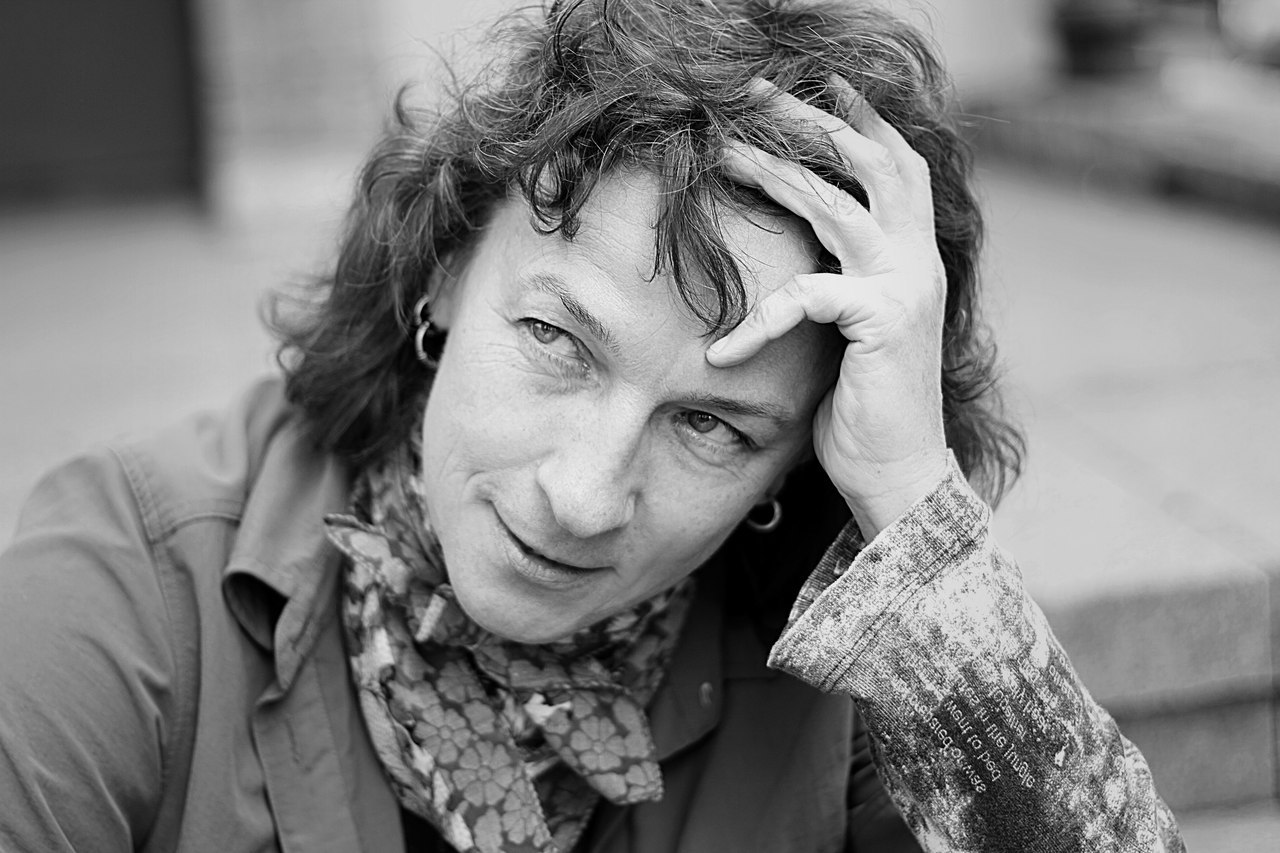
Krause in 2012

Olga Leopoldovna Krause (born March 1953) is a Russian-born poet, singer-songwriter, and LGBT rights activist.

She is the publisher of the Probuzhdenie journal. After coming out as lesbian, she left Russia for Ukraine.

== Early life and education ==
Krause was born on 12th or 15th March 1953 in Leningrad to parents who were railway workers.

She graduated from secondary school number 75 in Dnepropetrovsk.

== Career and activism ==
Krause worked at a Komsomol work camp before working as a press operator at a paper mill. She later worked at Gostinny Dvo department store in Leningrad.

Krause published the Probuzhdenie (English: Awakening) journal and performs as a folk singer. Her 1980's song Где ты упал (English: Where did you fall?) is about a Soviet soldier who burned to death in a tank during Soviet–Afghan War.

== Personal life ==
Despite being lesbian, following an unexpected breakup, she hastily married a man only to break up with him three days later. After finding the identification card that a male soldier had lost, she forged her own photograph onto it, used the man's identification and married her girlfriend.

After she came out on television, she was pushed out of her job and relocated to Kharkiv, Ukraine.
