= Transgressive fiction =

Genre of literature

Transgressive fiction is a genre of literature which focuses on characters who feel confined by the norms and expectations of society and who break free of those confines in unusual or illicit ways.

== Literary context ==
Because they are rebelling against the basic norms of society, protagonists of transgressive fiction may seem mentally ill, anti-social, or nihilistic. The genre deals extensively with taboo subject matters such as drugs, sexual activity, violence, incest, pedophilia, and crime. The genre of "transgressive fiction" was defined by Los Angeles Times literary critic Michael Silverblatt.

Michel Foucault's essay "A Preface to Transgression" (1963) provides an important methodological origin for the concept of transgression in literature. The essay uses Story of the Eye by Georges Bataille as an example of transgressive fiction.

Rene Chun, a journalist for The New York Times, described transgressive fiction:

A literary genre that graphically explores such topics as incest and other aberrant sexual practices, mutilation, the sprouting of sexual organs in various places on the human body, urban violence and violence against women, drug use, and highly dysfunctional family relationships, and that is based on the premise that knowledge is to be found at the edge of experience and that the body is the site for gaining knowledge.

The genre has been the subject of controversy, and many forerunners of transgressive fiction, including William S. Burroughs and Hubert Selby Jr., have been the subjects of obscenity trials.

Transgressive fiction shares similarities with splatterpunk, noir, and erotic fiction in its willingness to portray forbidden behaviors and shock readers. But it differs in that protagonists often pursue means to better themselves and their surroundings—albeit unusual and extreme ones. Much transgressive fiction deals with searches for self-identity, inner peace, or personal freedom. Unbound by usual restrictions of taste and literary convention, its proponents claim that transgressive fiction is capable of incisive social commentary.

== History ==
The basic ideas of transgressive fiction are by no means new. Many works that are now considered classics dealt with controversial themes and harshly criticized societal norms. Early examples include the scandalous writing of the Marquis de Sade and the Comte de Lautréamont's Les Chants de Maldoror (1869). French author Émile Zola's works about social conditions and "bad behavior" are examples, as are Russian Fyodor Dostoevsky's novels Crime and Punishment (1866) and Notes from Underground (1864), and Norwegian Knut Hamsun's psychologically-driven Hunger (1890). Sexual extravagance can be seen in two of the earliest European novels, the Satyricon and The Golden Ass, and also (with disclaimers) Moll Flanders and some of the excesses of early Gothic fiction.

A simpler, more literal example of transgressive fiction is Kate Chopin's The Awakening, in which a married woman, feeling confined by the gender constructs of her society and pressures imposed upon her by her family and friends to be keen in her duties as a mother and wife, leaves her family and pursues extramarital relationships. Commenting on gender roles of the late 19th century, The Awakening faced major criticism for its depiction of a woman being unfaithful to her family, despite the fact that Chopin had written several similar short stories prior to Awakening's publication. It is now considered to be a landmark of early feminist literature.

The early development of the genre was anticipated in the work of early 20th-century writers such as Octave Mirbeau, Georges Bataille, and Arthur Schnitzler, who explored psychosexual development.

On 6 December 1933, US federal judge John M. Woolsey overturned the federal ban on James Joyce's Ulysses. The book was banned in the US due to what the government claimed was obscenity, specifically parts of Molly Bloom's "soliloquy" at the end of the book. Random House Inc. challenged the claim of obscenity in federal court and was granted permission to print the book in the US. Judge Woolsey's explanation for his removal of the ban is often quoted: "It is only with the normal person that the law is concerned."

In the late 1950s, American publisher Grove Press, under publisher Barney Rosset, began releasing decades-old novels that had been unpublished in most of the English-speaking world for many years due to controversial subject matter. Two of these works, Lady Chatterley's Lover (D. H. Lawrence's tale of an upper class woman's affair with a working class man) and Tropic of Cancer (Henry Miller's sexual odyssey), were the subject of landmark obscenity trials (Lady Chatterley's Lover was also tried in the UK and Austria). Both books were ruled not obscene and forced the US courts to weigh the merit of literature that would have once been instantly deemed pornographic (see Miller test). Similarly, the author Vladimir Nabokov published Lolita in 1955 to a great deal of controversy due to the hebephilia that occurs between the book's main characters, Humbert Humbert and Lolita. The transgressive nature of this subject has made Lolita a book often found on the list of books banned by governments and the list of most commonly challenged books in the United States.

Grove Press also published the explicit works of Beat writers, which led to two more obscenity trials. The first concerned Howl, Allen Ginsberg's 1955 poem which celebrated American counterculture and decried hypocrisy and emptiness in mainstream society. The second concerned William S. Burroughs' hallucinatory, satirical novel Naked Lunch (1959). Both works contained what were considered lewd descriptions of body parts and sexual acts. Grove also published Hubert Selby Jr.'s anecdotal novel Last Exit to Brooklyn (1964), known for its gritty portrayals of criminals, and sex workers and its crude, slang-inspired prose. Last Exit to Brooklyn was tried as obscene in the UK. Grove Press won all these trials, and the victories paved the way both for transgressive fiction to be published legally, as well as bringing attention to these works.

In the 1970s and '80s, an entire underground of transgressive fiction flourished. Its biggest stars included J. G. Ballard, a British writer known for his strange and frightening dystopian novels; Kathy Acker, an American known for her sex-positive feminist fiction; and Charles Bukowski, an American known for his tales of womanizing, drinking, and gambling. The notorious 1971 film version of Anthony Burgess's A Clockwork Orange contained scenes of rape and "ultraviolence" by a futuristic youth gang complete with its own argot, and was a major influence on popular culture; it was subsequently withdrawn in the UK, and heavily censored in the US.

In the 1990s, the rise of alternative rock and its distinctly downbeat subculture opened the door for transgressive writers to become more influential and commercially successful than ever before. This is exemplified by the influence of Canadian Douglas Coupland's 1990 novel Generation X: Tales for an Accelerated Culture, which explored the economically-bleak and apocalypse-fixated worldview of Coupland's age group. The novel popularized the term Generation X to describe this age demographic. Other influential authors of this decade include Bret Easton Ellis, known for novels about depraved yuppies; Irvine Welsh, known for his portrayals of Scotland's drug-addicted working class youth; and Chuck Palahniuk, known for his characters' bizarre attempts to escape bland consumer culture. Both of Elizabeth Young's volumes of literary criticism from this period deal extensively and exclusively with this range of authors and the contexts in which their works can be viewed.

The early 21st century saw the rise of writers like Rupert Thomson, R. D. Ronald and Kelly Braffet with their protagonists further pushing the criminal, sexual, violent, narcotic, self-harm, anti-social and mental illness related subject matter taboos from the shadows of the transgressive umbrella into the forefront of mainstream fiction. Ronald's novels The Elephant Tree and The Zombie Room are based in the fictional city of Garden Heights, providing a fresh, contemporary melting pot to showcase the amalgamation of UK and US cultural and societal dissatisfaction and frustration, that had previously been portrayed very differently.

In the UK, the genre owes a considerable influence to "working-class literature", which often portrays characters trying to escape poverty by inventive means, while in the US, the genre focuses more on middle-class characters trying to escape the emotional and spiritual limitations of their lifestyle.

== Notable works ==
Petronius

- Satyricon (1st century AD)

Apuleius

- The Golden Ass (2nd century AD)

François Rabelais

- Gargantua and Pantagruel (1532-1564)

Daniel Defoe

- Moll Flanders (1722)

John Cleland

- Fanny Hill (1748-49)

Voltaire

- Candide (1759)

Pierre Choderlos de Laclos

- Les liaisons dangereuses (1782)

Marquis de Sade

- The 120 Days of Sodom (1785)
- Justine (1791)

Matthew Gregory Lewis

- The Monk (1796)

James Hogg

- The Private Memoirs and Confessions of a Justified Sinner (1824)

Emily Brontë

- Wuthering Heights (1847)

Anne Brontë

- The Tenant of Wildfell Hall (1848)

Gustave Flaubert

- Madame Bovary (1856)

Fyodor Dostoevsky

- Notes from Underground (1864)
- Crime and Punishment (1866)

Émile Zola

- Thérèse Raquin (1866)
- La Fortune des Rougon (1871)
- Nana (1880)
- Germinal (1885)

Comte de Lautréamont

- Les Chants de Maldoror (1868-69)

Knut Hamsun

- Hunger (1890)

Oscar Wilde

- The Picture of Dorian Gray (1890)

Kate Chopin

- The Awakening (1899)

Octave Mirbeau

- The Torture Garden (1899)
- The Diary of a Chambermaid (1900)

Thomas Mann

- Death in Venice (1912)
- The Magic Mountain (1924)

James Joyce

- Ulysses (1922)

D. H. Lawrence

- Lady Chatterley's Lover (1928)

Georges Bataille

- Story of the Eye (1928)
- L'Abbé C (1950)
- Blue of Noon (1957)

Louis-Ferdinand Céline

- Journey to the End of the Night (1932)
- Death on Credit (1936)

Henry Miller

- Tropic of Cancer (1934)
- Tropic of Capricorn (1939)
- The Rosy Crucifixion (1949–59)

Anaïs Nin

- House of Incest (1936)
- Winter of Artifice (1939)
- Under a Glass Bell (1944)
- Cities of the Interior (1959)
- Delta of Venus (1977)

John Hawkes

- The Cannibal (1949)

William S. Burroughs

- Junkie (1953)
- Naked Lunch (1959)
- The Wild Boys (1971)
- Queer (1985)

Vladimir Nabokov

- Lolita (1955)
- Ada, or Ardor (1969)

Grace Metalious

- Peyton Place (1956)

Allen Ginsberg

- Howl (1956)

Edna O'Brien

- The Country Girls (1960)
- The Lonely Girl (1962)
- Girls in Their Married Bliss (1964)

Anthony Burgess

- A Clockwork Orange (1962)

John Fowles

- The Collector (1963)

Hubert Selby Jr.

- Last Exit to Brooklyn (1964)
- Requiem for a Dream (1978)

Cormac McCarthy

- The Orchard Keeper (1965)
- Outer Dark (1968)
- Child of God (1973)
- Blood Meridian (1985)

Norman Mailer

- An American Dream (1965)
- Tough Guys Don't Dance (1984)

Gabriel García Márquez

- One Hundred Years of Solitude (1967)
- Love in the Time of Cholera (1985)
- Of Love and Other Demons (1994)
- Memories of My Melancholy Whores (2004)

Gore Vidal

- Myra Breckinridge (1968)

Philip Roth

- Portnoy's Complaint (1969)

J. G. Ballard

- The Atrocity Exhibition (1970)
- Crash (1973)

Hunter S. Thompson

- Fear and Loathing in Las Vegas (1971)

Charles Bukowski

- Post Office (1971)
- Factotum (1975)
- The Most Beautiful Woman in Town & Other Stories (1983)

John Berger

- G. (1972)

Thomas Pynchon

- Gravity's Rainbow (1973)

Erica Jong

- Fear of Flying (1973)

Judith Rossner

- Looking for Mr. Goodbar (1975)
- Attachments (1977)

Ian McEwan

- The Cement Garden (1978)
- The Comfort of Strangers (1981)

Ryū Murakami

- Almost Transparent Blue (1976)
- Coin Locker Babies (1980)
- Piercing (1994)
- In the Miso Soup (1997)
- Audition (1997)

Gary Jennings

- Aztec (1980)

Elfriede Jelinek

- The Piano Teacher (1983)

J.M Coetzee

- Life & Times of Michael K (1983)
- Disgrace (2000)

Iain Banks

- The Wasp Factory (1984)

Kathy Acker

- Blood and Guts in High School (1984)

Bret Easton Ellis

- Less than Zero (1985)
- American Psycho (1991)
- Lunar Park (2005)

Patrick Süskind

- Perfume (1985)

Carolyn Chute

- The Beans of Egypt, Maine (1985)
- Snow Man (1999)

Salman Rushdie

- The Satanic Verses (1988)

Wang Shuo

- Playing for Thrills (1989)

Katherine Dunn

- Geek Love (1989)

José Saramago

- The Gospel According to Jesus Christ (1991)
- Blindness (1995)
- Seeing (2004)

William T. Vollmann

- The Rainbow Stories (1989)
- Whores for Gloria (1992)
- The Royal Family (2000)

Dennis Cooper

- Closer (1989)
- Frisk (1991)
- The Sluts (2004)

Douglas Coupland

- Generation X: Tales for an Accelerated Culture (1990)

Patrick McCabe

- The Butcher Boy (1992)

Will Self

- Bock and Bull (1992)
- My Idea of Fun (1993)
- The Sweet Smell of Psychosis (1996)

Denis Johnson

- Jesus' Son (1993)

Nikanor Teratologen

- Assisted Living (1993)

Virginie Despentes

- Baise-moi (1993)
- Apocalypse Bébé (2010)
- Vernon Subutex trilogy (2015-17)

Irvine Welsh

- Trainspotting (1993)
- Filth (1998)

Ray Shell

- Iced (1993)

Michel Houellebecq

- Whatever (1994)
- Atomised (1998)
- Platform (2001)
- Submission (2015)
- Serotonin (2019)

Jáchym Topol

- Sestra (1994)

Charles Burns

- Black Hole (1995-2005)

Samuel R. Delaney

- Hogg (1995)

A.M. Homes

- The End of Alice (1996)
- May We Be Forgiven (2012)

Chuck Palahniuk

- Fight Club (1996)
- Invisible Monsters (1999)
- Haunted (2005)
- Rant (2007)
- Adjustment Day (2018)

Matthew Stokoe

- Cows (1998)
- High Life (2002)

Tawni O'Dell

- Back Roads (1999)

Rupert Thomson

- The Book of Revelation (2000)

DBC Pierre

- Vernon God Little (2003)

Lionel Shriver

- We Need to Talk About Kevin (2003)

Roberto Bolaño

- 2666 (2004)

Han Kang

- The Vegetarian (2007)
- Human Acts (2014)

Alissa Nutting

- Tampa (2013)

Travis Jeppesen

- The Suiciders (2013)

Blake Butler

- 300,000,000 (2014)

Mark Doten

- The Infernal (2015)
- Trump Sky Alpha (2019)
- Whites (2025)

B.R. Yeager

- Amygdalatropolis (2017)
- Negative Space (2020)

Elle Nash

- Animals Eat Each Other (2018)
- Deliver Me (2023)

Chris Kelso

- The DREGS Trilogy (2020)

Kate Folk

- Sky Daddy (2025)

== See also ==
- Horror fiction
- Transgressive art

== Bibliography ==
- Mookerjee, Robin (2013). Transgressive Fiction: The New Satiric Tradition. New York: Palgrave Macmillan. p. 255. ISBN 978-1-349-33318-9.
- Nicol, Bran (2009). The Cambridge Introduction to Postmodern Fiction. New York: Cambridge University Press. p. 220. ISBN 978-0-521-86157-1.
- McHale, Brian; Platt, Len (2016). The Cambridge History of Postmodern Literature. New York: Cambridge University Press. p. 552. ISBN 978-1107140271.
- Slocombe, William (2006). Nihilism and the Sublime Postmodern: The (Hi)Story of a Difficult Relationship from Romanticism to Postmodernism. New York: Routledge. p. 224. ISBN 0-415-97529-8.
