= Nudes (book) =

2021 book by Elle Nash

- Cover of the first edition paperback of Nudes by Elle Nash
- Author: Elle Nash
- Language: English
- Genre: Short Story Collection Transgressive Fiction
- Publisher: Short Flight/Long Drive Books
- Publication date: April 2, 2021
- Publication place: United Kingdom
- Pages: 242
- ISBN: 978-0-996-49493-9

Nudes is a 2021 short story collection written by British-American author Elle Nash that reflects on the lives of working-class women. It includes 24 stories split into sections named "Fluffers", "Yuri", "Pukkaki", "Moneyshot", "POV", and "Snuff". It discusses transactional relationships, sexuality, eating disorders, obsession, and death. The stories are largely set in the 1990s and 2000s, and could form part of a shared world. In the title story "Nudes", a woman has an imagined affair with her neighbor while her wife struggles with alcoholism.

The collection of stories began in 2013, the first stories written being "Rifle", "Off Screen I Ache" and "Deathwish 006", and the last being "Nudes". Nash also states that her earliest publicized story included in this collection was "Joan Jumps into the Sea", written in 2014, published in 2015 in The Offing. For the short story "Survivalist", Nash states that she collaborated with author Elizabeth Ellen for the editing process. Ellen is also mentioned as a best friend and mentor in the acknowledgements of the collection.

Nash states that although the short story collection doesn't have a traditional structure, she was inspired by Dennis Cooper's collection Frisk and its interwoven stories. The story "Satanism" was inspired by The Artist Is Present, performed by Marina Abramović.

== Stories ==
Section title	Story title	Plot	First published magazine appearance
Fluffers	"Ideation"	A third-person narration of an unnamed older woman referred to only as "she" and a girl who lives with her boyfriend and mother in the apartment below the older woman, referred to as "the girlfriend". The older woman, who used to be a sex worker and murdered a man, semi-sexually examines the girlfriend living in an abusive relationship.	Post Road Magazine
Fluffers	"Who's Afraid of a Funeral Pyre"	Meg and her friends Jodi and Blake that live in an apartment building where an old man passed, and his former apartment is being cleaned.	The Nervous Breakdown
Fluffers	"Joan Jumps into the Sea"	The shortest story in the collection: a narrator intentionally gets inside the body of a blue whale and swims inside its veins to its heart to find a person referred to as "you".	The Offing
Fluffers	"Brittanies"	A man talks to the audience as his girlfriend in the style of an oversharing conversation. The narrator retells a story with a friend called "Meatsack" getting a call from Brittany Siebens from a strange address. The narrator and Meatsack find Brittany in an apartment with her abusive boyfriend.	
Yuri	"Cat World"	A girl is in an AOL chatroom for people pretending to be catboys and catgirls. In real life, she is love with her friend Mikaela but she has a boyfriend, Mason, and the narrator has a boyfriend, Shawn. She is around 15 years old and her friends push her to do illicit substances and sexual actions, along with ExxonMobil6, a chat room user who demands sexual pictures from her.	Guernica
Yuri	"Nudes"	A woman is disconnected to her girlfriend Michelle after she cannot change her alcoholism. She projects sexual fantasies on a next-door neighbor after seeing him masturbate.	Created for the short story collection
Yuri	"Grace"	A woman describes the emergence of spiders in her house and the anxiety brought by their presence and recollection of her ex-husband.	Guernica
Yuri	"Dead to Me"	New mother Lyla is in a year-long marriage with Logan, the working husband who's suicidal, and caring for an 8-month-old baby. Another couple they know, Mandy and Cruz, invite them to drink and Mandy kisses the narrator.	Adroit Journal
Pukkaki	"Define Hungry"	A woman and her husband Erik are in struggling debt while dangerously close to being unable to pay utilities. There is no designated food fund. The woman instead steals from self-checkout using a fake pregnancy belly.	
Pukkaki	"Thank You, Lauren Greenfield"	A woman struggling with bulimia writes diary entries. She is currently going to AA meetings. She obsesses over the film Thin, directed by Lauren Greenfield, thinking about how she idolizes anorexia, and being too attached to the identity of having an eating disorder.	HARSH Magazine
Pukkaki	"We Are Sharp Edges Bumping Against Each Other"	A woman struggling with an eating disorder, self-harm, and codependence in a relationship considers she may also have borderline personality disorder.	Doestoyevsky Wannabe's Casette 94 Collection
Pukkaki	"Livestream"	A woman bearing a child leaves her husband to travel to a restaurant on a pit stop. She's paid by a livestream of her purging in the restroom.	Joyland
Moneyshot	"Off Screen I Ache"	A woman and her partner Gavin are currently filming a porno when her teeth suddenly fall out of their sockets.	Entropy Magazine, first appearing as "Anatomy of a Mouth"
Moneyshot	"A Deep Well"	A woman is pregnant with her unemployed partner, whom she calls "Daddy". She hears him shoot himself in the bathtub.	
Moneyshot	"Survivalist"	A woman on a return trip from a failed online connection smashes her phone.	Denver Quarterly
Moneyshot	"Unsolved Mysteries"	Linsey bears the weight of the thought that her husband might commit suicide. He vows not to do it, but makes considerations so she will not be convicted of murder if it happens.	Rabble Lit
Moneyshot	"I Live in a World Where Men with Money Want to Take Away My Wife"	The narrator thinks of her wife, whom she calls "E", having an affair with a rich man called "Playboy".	Always Crashing
POV	"Summer Thighs"	The narrator watches a film of herself having sex with her ex-boyfriend in the back of a car.	Tarpaulin Sky
POV	"Charlton Heston Played John the Baptist but I Remember Him as Jesus"	The narrator reflects on their adolescence captured in photographs, considering the things they remember, don't remember, and may be making up based on the existence of a photograph.	Hobart Pulp
POV	"Rifle"	Rifle is the name of a southwestern American town the narrator lives in. Her past love, Luis, left town five years ago to be a professional photographer.	Blunderbuss Magazine, first appearing as "The Wasp"
Snuff	"Deathwish 006"	A woman thinks about the possibility of dying on the way to the liquor store, on the bathroom floor, and on the highway. Her boyfriend's ex-girlfriend died in a car accident with her feet on the dashboard. The image haunts both of them.	Nailed Magazine
Snuff	"Glockjaw"	A woman named Amanda is in the hospital after an incident she cannot remember.	
Snuff	"Satanism"	The narrator is engaged and shares custody of a dog and her sister's child when her sister is killed in an accident. They think of disposing of the dog and other hurt wildlife they don't have the capacity to care for.	Hobart Pulp
Snuff	"Room Service"	A woman is with her husband on their wedding night in a hotel, where her husband shows her a video of a man being killed by L.A. Police.	New York Tyrant

== Reception ==
The magazine Cosmopolitan featured Nudes as one of the 18 books for 2022 "sad girl summer". Transgressive fiction author Dennis Cooper, best known for his series The George Miles Cycle, listed the short story collection as his favorite 2021 media on his blog. It was listed in Lit Hub's Most Anticipated Books of 2021. Maudlin House, a magazine on experimental literature, in a review writes "The concrete and existential exist side by side in these stories. Sometimes, the directness of a line hits me like a brick and I need to lie down."

Artist Kerry St. Laurent created a series of eight art pieces in a collection named "Nudes X Elle Nash (2021)" in response to the short story collection.
