= Deliver Me =

Deliver Me may refer to:

- Deliver Me (American TV series), an American medical reality series
- Deliver Me (Swedish TV series), a 2024 Swedish drama miniseries
- "Deliver Me" (song), a 1996 song by the Beloved, covered by Sarah Brightman in 1999
- Deliver Me (film), also known as Délivrez-moi, a 2006 drama film directed by Denis Chouinard
- The Kid with a Bike, also known as Délivrez-moi, a 2011 drama film directed by Jean-Pierre and Luc Dardenne
- "Deliver Me", a song by Def Leppard from Slang
- "Deliver Me", a song by INXS from The Greatest Hits
- "Deliver Me", a song by Lost Society from No Absolution
- "Deliver Me", a song by Parkway Drive from Deep Blue
- "Deliver Me", a song by Roch Voisine from Kissing Rain
- "Deliver Me", a song by Tom Petty & The Heartbreakers from Long After Dark
- Deliver Me, a 2023 novel by Elle Nash

== See also ==
- Psalm 59
