= KAGE =

KAGE may refer to:

- KAGE (AM), a radio station (1580 AM) licensed to serve Van Buren, Arkansas, United States
- KHWK (AM), a radio station (1380 AM) licensed to serve Winona, Minnesota, United States, which held the call sign KAGE from 1957 to 2019
- KGSL, a radio station (95.3 FM) licensed to serve Winona, Minnesota, which held the call sign KAGE-FM until 2015
- KAGE: Alternative Game Engine, a free and open-source game engine
- Kaze Green Economy, an environmentally friendly charcoal manufacturer in Burundi
- Shadow of the Ninja, a video game

== See also ==
- Kage (disambiguation)
