= Person A =

Person A may refer to:

- PersonA, a 2016 album by Edward Sharpe and the Magnetic Zeros
- Person(a), a 1987 album by Norman Iceberg
- Person/a, a 2017 novel by Elizabeth Ellen
- Konstantin Kilimnik, a Russian/Ukrainian political consultant known as "Person A" in court documents
