= Lauren Greenfield =

American photographer and filmmaker (born 1966)

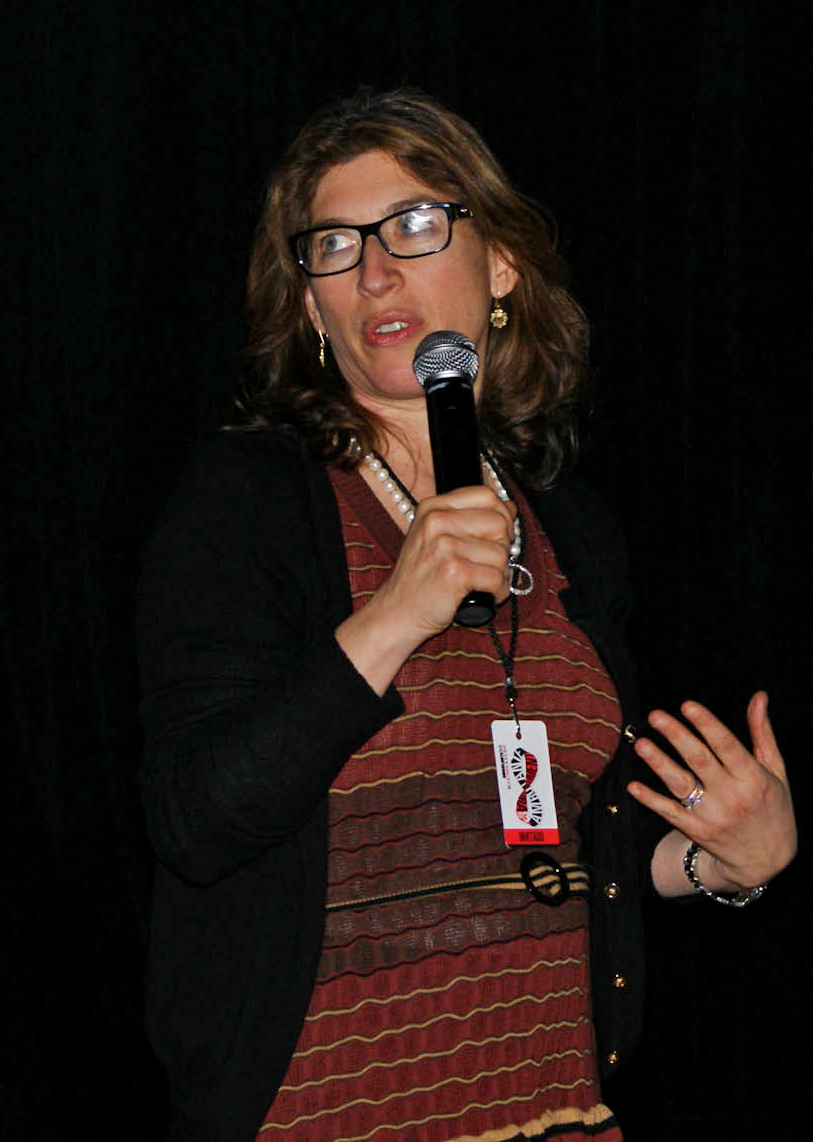
- Greenfield in 2013
- Born: June 28, 1966 (age 60); Boston, Massachusetts, U.S.
- Education: Harvard University
- Occupations: Film director; artist
- Spouse: Frank Evers (m. 1992)
- Children: 2
- Parent(s): Sheldon Greenfield and Patricia Marks Greenfield
- Relatives: Matthew Greenfield (brother)
- Website: laurengreenfield.com

Lauren Greenfield (born June 28, 1966) is an American artist, documentary photographer, and documentary filmmaker. She has published photographic monographs, directed documentary features and series, produced traveling exhibitions, and published in magazines throughout the world.

== Early life and education ==
Lauren Greenfield was born on June 28, 1966, in Boston, Massachusetts, to psychologist Patricia Marks Greenfield and physician Sheldon Greenfield. She has a younger brother, film producer Matthew Greenfield. She attended Crossroads School for Arts & Sciences in Santa Monica.

Greenfield graduated from Harvard University in 1987 with a Bachelor of Arts degree in visual and environmental studies. While an undergraduate, she studied overseas in several countries with the International Honors Program, a division of SIT Study Abroad. Her senior thesis photography project on the French aristocracy was called "Survivors of the French Revolution".

== Career ==
=== Photography ===
Greenfield's undergraduate thesis helped kick start her career as an intern for National Geographic Magazine. A subsequent grant from National Geographic provided financial support toward her debut monograph, Fast Forward: Growing Up in the Shadow of Hollywood (Knopf 1997). Five years after the release of Fast Forward, Greenfield produced a second major body of work about the self-esteem crisis amongst American women, entitled Girl Culture.

=== Film ===
==== Undergraduate years ====
From September 1985 to May 1986, while still an undergraduate at Harvard, Greenfield traveled around the world on a nine-month-long program created by the International Honors Program, entitled "Film Study and Anthropology". This experience exposed her to anthropological and documentary filmmaking in France, Yugoslavia, Hungary, Austria, India, Australia, and Japan. In a 2012 interview with Sara Melson (for Harvardwood.com), Greenfield was quoted as saying "We watched many indigenous films, and we met with amazing directors. It was on that trip that I realized my calling. I wasn't sure if it would be sociology, film, photography, or anthropology, but looking at culture was my calling. When I got back to Harvard, I switched my major from Social Studies to Visual Studies. I soon realized that theory wasn't my medium, and I moved toward filmmaking and photography." At Harvard, Greenfield continued her filmmaking studies under the tutelage of established documentary filmmaker Robb Moss. In 1988, she co-directed a 25-minute film, Once You're In, with Harvard classmate Rachel Watanabe-Batton about Irish illegal immigrants living in Boston.

==== Thin (HBO) ====
Greenfield subsequently directed Thin, a feature-length documentary for HBO, and published an accompanying book with the same title. Thin was selected for competition at the Sundance Film Festival in 2006. In September 2006, Greenfield received the Grierson Award for best documentary shown at the BFI London Film Festival. It also won the Grand Jury Prize at the Independent Film Festival of Boston, the Newport International Film Festival, and the Jackson Hole Film Festival. Greenfield received a 2007 Emmy nomination for Outstanding Directing For Nonfiction Programming for her work on Thin. In 2020, fiction author Elle Nash wrote a short story found in her collection Nudes (2021) named "Thank You, Lauren Greenfield" about Thin on Harsh Lit Mag.

==== kids + money ====
Greenfield's follow-up short film, kids + money, was selected as one of the top five nonfiction shorts in the world by Cinema Eye Honors 2009. The short also won the Audience Award for Best Short Film at the AFI Film Festival 2007, the Michael Moore Award for Best Documentary Film at the 2008 Ann Arbor Film Festival, the Gold Plaque, Documentary:Social/Political from The Hugo Television Awards 2008, and Best Documentary Short at Kids First Film Festival 2008. kids + money was also selected into the Official Shorts Program at the Sundance Film Festival (January 2008). The 32-minute film includes interviews with Los Angeles teenagers on the subject of money and how it affects their lives. HBO licensed North American broadcast rights to kids + money, and the film has been distributed internationally.

==== Beauty CULTure ====
In February 2011, the Annenberg Space for Photography commissioned Greenfield to direct a short documentary film, Beauty CULTure, to serve as the central focus of the Beauty CULTure exhibition (May–November 2011). Shot in Paris, New York and Los Angeles, the 30-minute film is a critical examination of "beauty in popular culture, the narrowing definition of beauty in contemporary society, and the influence of media messages on the female body image".

==== The Queen of Versailles ====
In January 2012 Greenfield received the Sundance Film Festival's Directing Award, US Documentary 2012 for her documentary feature film, entitled The Queen of Versailles, which was released theatrically in 2012. Previously, The Queen of Versailles was selected for the U.S. Documentary Competition at the Sundance Film Festival 2012 (The world premieres of 16 American documentary films). Also in 2012, she was awarded the Grand Jury Prize from the Brisbane International Film Festival, a second Best Director Award from the RiverRun Film Festival, the Special Jury Documentary Feature prize from the deadCenter Film Festival. On October 22, 2012, The Queen of Versailles was nominated for Best Documentary Film, 2012 by the International Documentary Association (IDA). According to PBS/POV, The Queen of Versailles was ranked #2 of the Top 10 Documentaries of 2012, based on awards, nominations and other ranking criteria. In January 2013, Greenfield was nominated by the Directors Guild of America (DGA) for Outstanding Directorial Achievement in Documentaries for the year 2012.

In March 2014, Greenfield won a lawsuit brought by the film's main subject David Siegel. Siegel claimed Greenfield had not obtained a proper release from the subjects of the film, in particular David Siegel and Westgate Resorts. An IFTA arbitrator supported Greenfield's position and also awarded her $750,000 for legal fees.

In 2023, it was announced that the documentary would be adapted into a Broadway musical, also called The Queen of Versailles, starring Kristin Chenoweth and with music composed by Stephen Schwartz.

==== #likeagirl ====
In June 2014 Greenfield directed a commercial spot for Always/Leo Burnett called "#likeagirl", which debuted in June 2014. The commercial asked the question "When did doing something 'like a girl' become an insult?" In the commercial, running, throwing or fighting like a girl are seen by adults as equivalent to weak, but by young girls as strong. The spot went viral on the internet, culminating in over 58 million views of the US version on YouTube, 85 million YouTube views across all languages, and made over 4.4 billion impressions.

The spot was re-released as a 60-second piece during Super Bowl XLIX. Subsequently, the new "#likeagirl" Super Bowl piece was ranked #1 Super Bowl Spot by Adweek, #1 Super Bowl Spot by Advertising Age, and garnered the highest social media activity of any Super Bowl Spot by TechCrunch.

In January 2015, Greenfield was nominated by the Directors Guild of America (DGA) for Outstanding Directorial Achievement in Commercials for the year 2014. The online spot was ranked #1 by Marketing Magazine in its "Top 10 Marketing Moments", #2 on Fast Company's "20 Best Ads of 2014", #3 of "2014 Top Spots of the Year" by SHOOT, and #4 on Google's "The 10 Most Watched Ads on YouTube in 2014". The spot has won 6 CLIO Awards, including the Grand Clio for Public Relations as part of the 2014 CLIO AWARDS. It also received 5 separate winning cubes from at the 2015 ADC (Art Directors Club) Awards. At the 2015 Webby Awards, #likeagirl picked up 11 separate awards. At the 2015 D&AD Awards (United Kingdom), the spot received 8 "Pencil" nominations and won 5 "Pencil" Awards. At the London International Advertising Awards (LIAs), the spot received 8 awards. At the ANDYs, the spot picked up 3 Golds At the 2015 One Show Awards, the spot received 5 awards. The piece also picked up two awards at the AICP 2015, including a rare "Best of Show: Advertising Excellence/Single Commercial" recognition. At the last major awards show of the year, the 2015 Cannes Lions, the spot was the recipient of 14 individual awards, including the prestigious Titanium Award, The Grand Prix, and the Glass Lions Award. In December 2015, Greenfield was named the most awarded director in 2015 by AdAge for her work on "#likeagirl". In September 2015, "#likeagirl" won the 2015 Emmy Award for Best TV Commercial. In February 2025, the viral spot was also named by Ad Age Magazine as the "Best Super Bowl Ad Of All Time", beating out 15 other top Super Bowl ads going back several decades

==== Generation Wealth ====
Greenfield's film Generation Wealth was selected to be the opening night film at the Sundance Film Festival 2018 in the Documentary Premiere program. Nick Allen of RogerEbert.com wrote that the film was "a stunningly deeply resonant documentary about notions as seemingly obvious as the value of love over wealth itself." Ann-Derrick Gaillot's generally positive review in The Outline described it as a "a sprawling chronicle of decadence and decay" and "As a study of capitalist obsession, it’s a fascinating and at times frantic look at the very bizarre world we are all strangely accustomed to." Joseph Walsh of Time Out praised it for laying bare society's obsession with affluence and excess with "scalpel-sharp insight." He found the documentary to be bleak yet compelling, suggesting that it effectively captures and critiques societal trends around wealth and consumerism.

The film received its European premiere at the Berlin International Film Festival (aka Berlinale 68), where it was featured in the Panorama program. Other festivals include SXSW and CPH:DOX. The film was distributed by Amazon Studios and released in U.S. theaters on July 20, 2018. Greenfield received a nomination for the Writers Guild of America Award for Best Documentary Screenplay at the 71st Writers Guild of America Awards for the film.

==== The Kingmaker ====
The Kingmaker is a 2019 documentary film written and directed by Greenfield, featuring the political career of Imelda Marcos with a focus on the Marcos family's efforts to rehabilitate the family's image and to return to political power, including her plans to see her son Bongbong become President of the Philippines, and the alliance that Bongbong and Imee Marcos established with Rodrigo Duterte in his bid to win the 2016 Philippine presidential election.

It debuted internationally in August 2019 at the 76th Venice Film Festival, after which it premiered at the Telluride Film Festival, the Toronto International Film Festival, and the London Film Festival, the first documentary to ever debut at all four festivals in the same year. It debuted in the Philippines on January 29, 2020.

The Kingmaker was nominated as best documentary at the London Film Festival and the Stockholm Film Festival, and for the Checkpoints Award at the Bergen International Film Festival. It was nominated for four categories in the 2019 Critic’s Choice Documentary Awards, eventually winning the award for Most Compelling Living Subject of a Documentary. It also received the Audience Award for Best Documentary Film at the Warsaw International Film Festival 2019.

The film has a 97% rating from Rotten Tomatoes, 86% from Google Users, 7.6 from IMDb, and a 76/100 from Metacritic.

=== TV Series ===
==== Social Studies ====
Greenfield created and directed Social Studies for FX, a 2024 documentary series following high school students over the course of a school year in Los Angeles, exploring the lives of a generation growing up online. On the review aggregator website Rotten Tomatoes, 100% of 9 critics' reviews are positive, with an average rating of 9/10. On Metacritic, it has a weighted average score of 81 out of 100 based on 6 reviews, indicating "universal acclaim".

In February, 2025 Social Studies was nominated for a 2025 Independent Spirit Award for Best New Non-Scripted or Documentary Series. In June 2025, the series received the Gotham Award for Best Breakthrough Nonfiction Series on June 2, 2025. On July 15, 2025, the series was nominated for an Emmy Award in the Best Documentary or Nonfiction Series category.

== Collections ==
Her photography, including entire bodies of work like Fast Forward, Girl Culture, "Thin", and "Generation Wealth" is in many major collections such as the Art Institute of Chicago, Los Angeles County Museum of Art, the New Orleans Museum of Art, the J. Paul Getty Museum, the San Francisco Museum of Modern Art, the Smithsonian National Museum of American History, the International Center of Photography, the Center for Creative Photography, the Museum of Fine Arts Houston, the Harvard University Archive, the Smith College Museum of Art, the Clinton Library, and the French Ministry of Culture.

== Exhibitions ==
Alongside her books, Fast Forward, Girl Culture, Thin, and Generation Wealth Greenfield produced four large-scale traveling exhibitions with the same names.

In concert with the publication of her debut monograph, Fast Forward: Growing Up in the Shadow of Hollywood (1997), her first major show, Fast Forward had its US debut at the International Center for Photography (ICP) in 1997. The show was exhibited in France, the Netherlands, Italy, Russia and a number of cultural venues in North America.

The accompanying show to her second monograph, Girl Culture (2002), was exhibited at more than 29 venues around the world (France, Germany, the Netherlands, Russia and United States).

Her third major exhibition, Thin, accompanied both a feature-length documentary film, Thin (HBO, 2006), and a photographic book, Thin (2006). The exhibition debuted at The Women's Museum in Dallas, Texas and continued to exhibit through 2010.

In May 2011, Greenfield was a Featured Artist at The Annenberg Space for Photography, as part of its exhibition, Beauty CULTure (Los Angeles, 2011). Greenfield was also commissioned by The Annenberg Space for Photography to direct a 30-minute documentary film about the subject of the exhibition. The resultant film forms the centerpiece of the exhibition. In 2011, the exhibition received the Lucie Award for Curator (Kohle Yohannan) / Exhibition of the Year.

In 2010, a collection of her photography from Fast Forward and Girl Culture was included in Engaged Observers: Documentary Photography Since the Sixties, a photographic exhibition at the Getty Museum in Los Angeles, curated by Brett Abbott. In October 2010, the exhibition received the Lucie Award for Curator (Brett Abbott) / Exhibition of the Year. In 2016 the International Center of Photography (ICP) honored Greenfield with a Spotlight Award for her "extensive contributions to the visual storytelling world."

Greenfield exhibited Generation Wealth by Lauren Greenfield at The Annenberg Space for Photography in Los Angeles (2017). This exhibit subsequently traveled to New York's ICP (2018), Oslo's Nobel Peace Center Museum (2018), The Hague's Fotomuseum Den Haag (2018/19), Hamburg's Deichtorhallen, the Louisiana Museum of Modern Art, Humlebæk (2019/20), Fotografiska Museet Stockholm (2020), and the Multimedia Art Museum, Moscow (2021). According to the Annenberg Space for Photography website, this exhibition covers "the influence of affluence over the last 25 years, illustrating the globalization of materialism, celebrity culture and social status," and contains prints, first-person interviews and accompanying multimedia projections and short films. Writing about the Generation Wealth exhibit for Artforum, Naomi Fry noted, "[W]hat makes Greenfield's photographs multilayered, sensitive, and fascinating—and carries them beyond a singleminded morality tale—is her understanding that people's relationships with things in this lurid world are pleasurable and miserable both."

On September 26th, 2026 Fotografiska Berlin will opens "Lauren Greenfield: Social Studies" in their main hall. Per the museum's longline - "Through photographs, installations, and immersive environments, the exhibition traces how social media reshapes identity. Giant photo grids turn private posts into public conversation: hundreds of snapshots, viral beauty trends, and emotional selfies exploring bullying, beauty standards, comparison, race, sexuality, and the life-altering decisions of teenage life. A dedicated screening room presents all five episodes of the Social Studies documentary series, inviting visitors to spend extended time with the voices at the heart of the exhibition."

== Personal life ==
Greenfield married Frank Evers in 1992.

== Publications ==
- Thin. Chronicle, 2006. ISBN 978-0811856331.
- Girl Culture. Chronicle, 2002. ISBN 978-0811837903. With an introduction by Joan Jacobs Brumberg.
  - Chronicle, 2016. ISBN 978-1452159287.
- Fast Forward: Growing Up in the Shadow of Hollywood.
  - Hardcover. Knopf, 1997.
  - Softcover. Chronicle, 2002.
  - Softcover. Chronicle, 2004. ISBN 978-0811844130. With an afterword by Richard Rodriguez.
- Generation Wealth. Phaidon, 2017. ISBN 978-0714872124.
- The Queen of Versailles: An American Allegory. Lannoo, 2026. ISBN 978-9059964518.

== Filmography ==
Lauren Greenfield audio-visual work
Year	Title	Credited as	Notes
1988	Once You're In	Co-Director (with Rachel Watanabe-Batton)	Documentary short
2006	THIN	Director and producer	Documentary
2008	kids + money	Director, producer and writer	Documentary short
2010	Fashion Show	Director and producer	Documentary short
2012	The Queen of Versailles	Director and producer	Documentary
2012	Beauty CULTure	Director and producer	Documentary short
2012	Best Night Ever	Director and producer	Documentary short
2015	Bling Dynasty	Director and producer	TV series documentary
2015	Magic City	Director and producer	Documentary short
2018	Generation Wealth	Director, producer, writer, and cinematographer	Documentary
2019	The Kingmaker	Director, producer, and writer	Documentary
2024	Social Studies	Creator, Director, and producer	Documentary
