= Kage =

Kage may refer to:

== People ==
- Kage Casey (born 2003), American football player
- Bharamgouda Alagouda Kage, Indian politician
- Hervé Kage (born 1989), Congolese footballer
- Ivar Kåge (1881–1951), Swedish actor
- Wilhelm Kåge (1889–1960), Swedish artist and designer
- Samuel Conway, also known as "Uncle Kage"
- A former nickname used by Japanese singer Hironobu Kageyama

== Other ==
- Kåge, Skellefteå Municipality, Västerbotten County, Sweden
- Kage, Angola
- Kåge River (Swedish: Kågeälven), a river in Sweden
- The Japanese release title for the video game Shadow of the Ninja
- Kage (Street Fighter), the protagonist of the Street Fighter series
- The player character in Legend of Kage
- A character in the Yakuza franchise
- Another name for the main character in The Night Angel Trilogy by Brent Weeks
- A character in the Street Fighter series

== See also ==
- KAGE (disambiguation)
