= Frank Evers (businessman) =

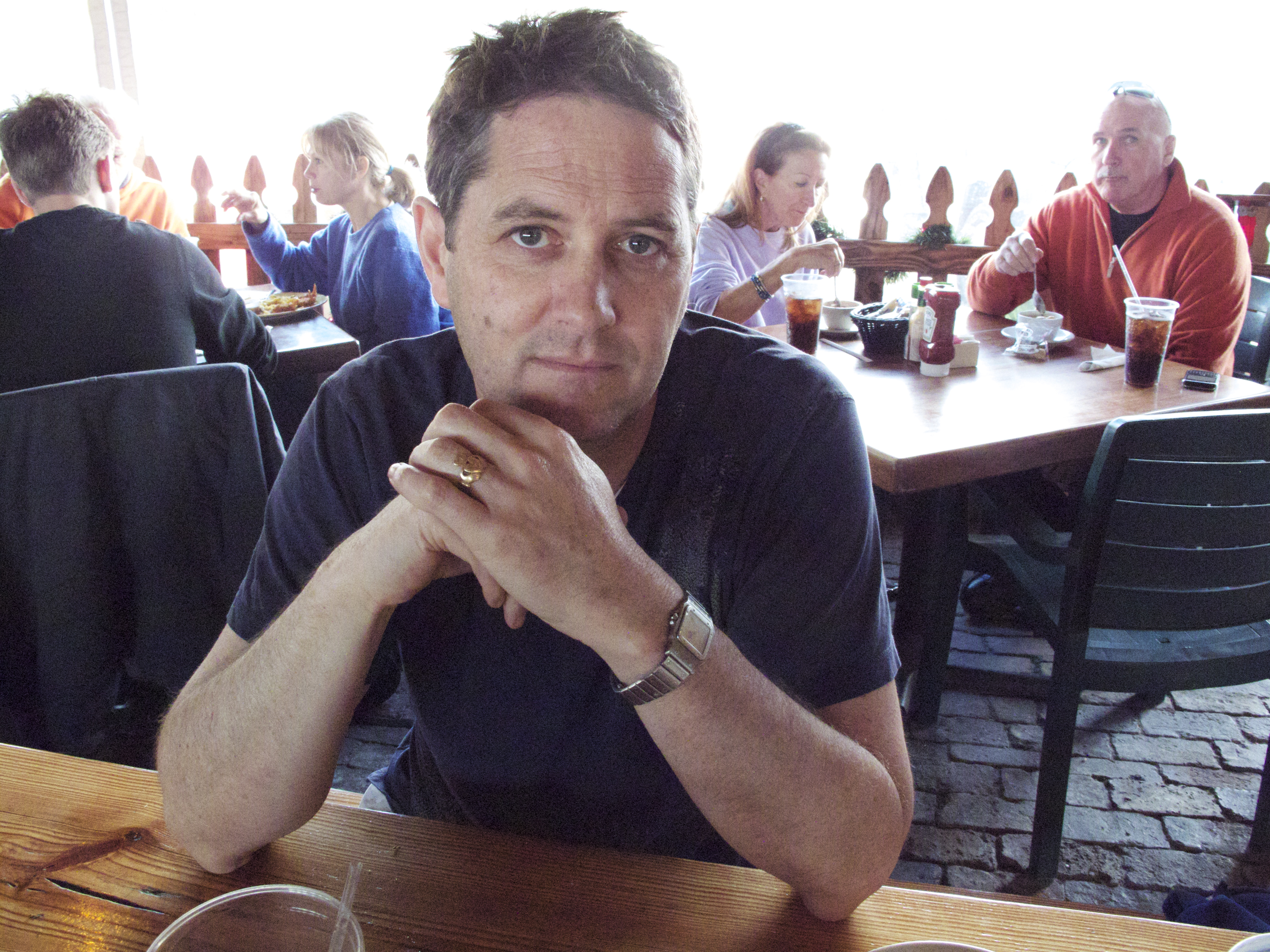
- At Duck Key, Florida
- Born: Francis Anthony Evers; 1965 (age 60–61); East Jerusalem, Jordan
- Education: Harvard University
- Occupations: Businessman; producer
- Spouse: Lauren Greenfield (m. 1992)
- Children: 2
- Relatives: Frank Evers (Gaelic footballer) (father); Patricia Marks Greenfield (mother-in-law)

Francis Anthony "Frank" Evers (born 1965) is an Irish–American businessman and film/TV producer, the CEO of INSTITUTE, and the president of Evergreen Pictures and Girl Culture Films.

== Early life ==
Evers was born to Francis Anthony Evers, a senior United Nations official, and Theresa (Doyle) Evers. His father was born in Menlough, Galway in 1934, and his mother was born in New York, United States in 1934 but spent most of her young life in Tuam, Galway. He has six siblings—five sisters and one brother. He grew up in the Middle East and Ireland until he moved to the US to attend Harvard University in 1983.

Evers attended secondary school from 1978 to 1983 at Ireland's Gormanston College, and is a graduate of Harvard University (1987), where he earned a B.A. in East Asian Studies. He has held the Irish Junior Men's record in the pole vault (4.60 m) since March 1983.

== Career ==
=== Institute (previously Girl Culture Films) ===
In January 2019, together with his wife, photographer and filmmaker Lauren Greenfield, Evers launched Girl Culture Films, a commercial, branded content and entertainment production company. Girl Culture Films sought "to amplify underrepresented voices in the media with outstanding directors who bring world-class storytelling, authentic vision, and diverse perspectives to the table." The company exclusively represents "A-list directors" including Lauren Greenfield (Evers' wife), Pamela Adlon, Catherine Hardwicke, Dawn Porter, Barbara Kopple, and Jackie Van Beek. In November 2022, Girl Culture Films evolved into Institute, broadening its directorial roster to include more underrepresented talent regardless of gender and offering greater integration with sister companies Institute Artist (Photography), and Girl Culture Studios (Film & Television).

=== Institute Artist ===
Founded with Matt Shonfeld in 2009, Institute Artist is an artist management, licensing, and multi-platform production company focused on editorial, cultural and commercial clients. Institute Artist represents filmmakers and photographers, and operates out of Los Angeles and London. In 2015, Institute Artist created a distribution arm called The Story Institute, which focuses on the distribution of long-form photographic stories.

=== Evergreen Pictures ===
Since founding the production company in 2003, Evers has run Evergreen Pictures with his wife, photographer and filmmaker Lauren Greenfield. The company's first feature documentary film, The Queen of Versailles, was directed by Greenfield and debuted at the Sundance Film Festival 2012, where it was selected to be the Opening Night film. The film was acquired by Magnolia Pictures and was theatrically released on July 20, 2012 throughout the US, ultimately grossing over $2,400,000 at the box office. The film was also acquired by Bravo for US television broadcast in Spring 2013.

Greenfield was awarded the Directing Award by the Sundance Jury, the Grand Jury Prize from the Brisbane International Film Festival, a Best Director Award from the RiverRun Film Festival, and the Special Jury Documentary Feature prize from the deadCenter Film Festival. "The Queen of Versailles" was also nominated for Best Documentary Film, 2012 by the International Documentary Association (IDA). In April 2023, it was announced that the documentary would be adapted into a Broadway musical, The Queen of Versailles, starring Kristin Chenoweth and with music composed by Stephen Schwartz. The musical opened at the St. James Theater on November 9, 2025, with Frank Evers and Lauren Greenfield as producers.

In 2015, Evergreen Pictures produced a documentary series in partnership with GQ/Conde Nast Entertainment, called Bling Dynasty (3 million views on YouTube), and a short documentary film called Magic City: A Film by Lauren Greenfield (over 17 million views on YouTube, TheScene.com & GQ.com). In January 2016, "Magic City" was nominated for Best Video by ASME (the American Society of Magazine Editors).

In May 2011, Evergreen Pictures produced "Beauty CULTure", a 30-minute-long documentary film by Greenfield for The Annenberg Space for Photography (Annenberg Foundation). "Beauty CULTure" had its US theatrical debut at the 2012 Tribeca Film Festival, where it was selected for the Shorts Documentary competition.

In December 2010, Evergreen Pictures produced a series of "documercials" for Chiat Day/Gatorade, called BECOME and directed by Greenfield, in conjunction with an accompanying national advertisement print campaign for Gatorade (also photographed by Greenfield). Earlier that same year, Evergreen Pictures produced a short video, Fashion Show, which debuted on New York Magazine's website, accompanying a photographic portfolio by Greenfield as part of New York Magazine's annual Fashion issue.

In 2007, Evergreen Pictures produced "kids + money" a 14-minute series of webisodes for The New York Times Magazine, after which it shot additional materials and produced an expanded 32-minute short film, which was sold to HBO, was distributed around the world, and garnered numerous international short film awards. In addition to producing documentary films, Evergreen Pictures has developed Greenfield's books and photography as feature films and television series with Columbia Pictures, Fox Searchlight, Universal Pictures, and NBC. Evergreen Pictures was responsible for the design, production and management of several traveling exhibition programs for Greenfield - Fast Forward, "Girl Culture", and Thin, which have appeared in more than 50 venues worldwide and seen by more than a million visitors.

In 2018, Evers produced Generation Wealth (Amazon Studios), and followed that up in 2019 with The Kingmaker (Showtime Networks). Both films were directed by Lauren Greenfield.

=== New York Photo Festival ===
Evers is also the cofounder and former cochair of the New York Photo Festival, a festival dedicated to contemporary photography. The third New York Photo Festival 2010 (NYPH'10) took place from May 12 to May 16, 2010. Evers resigned from the New York Photo Festival in June 2010 to co-create and start up the Future of StoryTelling with Charles Melcher and Melcher Media.

=== VII Photo Agency ===
From late 2004 to mid-2008, Evers stepped in to help effect a turnaround of the VII Photo Agency, where his wife (Greenfield) was an owner-member at the time. During this period, the agency expanded its roster and sales operation, opening offices in New York and Los Angeles, while creating a number of branded initiatives, including the VII Network, VII Masterclass, VII Seminar, VII gallery, VII bookstore, and VII Visionaires. He left to launch an artist management company, INSTITUTE. Greenfield subsequently left VII in September 2009 to join INSTITUTE.

=== Video game production ===
Before entering the photography business, Evers ran video game production studios producing over 100 interactive games for Sierra Entertainment, Activision and Disney Interactive (1995–2002). His most successful video game series were MechWarrior, Interstate '76, Who Wants to Be a Millionaire? and the Kingdom Hearts series (over 37 million units sold generating over $2.2 billion in retail sales), a joint venture between Disney Interactive and Square Japan. In addition to producing games, he was also the Director of Silent Thunder: A-10 Tank Killer II and The Mask, one of the first CD-ROM interactive comic books.

=== Film production ===
Earlier in his career, Evers was the film executive responsible for finding the script and packaging the movie Swimming with Sharks, while also handling finance and distribution for Cineville, which produced "The Crew" (1994) and "Mi Vida Loca" (1993).

== Personal life ==
Evers is married to photographer and director Lauren Greenfield, with whom he has two sons, Noah and Gabriel. They reside in Venice, California.
