= Kaze =

Kaze may refer to:

- KAZE, an American radio station located in Texas
- Kazé, a French publishing company
- Kaze-Forces for the Defense of Democracy, a political party in Burundi
- Kaze Green Economy, an environmentally friendly charcoal manufacturer in Burundi

== Fiction ==
- Kaze (television show), a 1967 jidaigeki (Japanese period drama)
- Kaze Hikaru, a Japanese manga series by Taeko Watanabe
- Kaze no Stigma, a Japanese light novel series by Takahiro Yamato
- Kaze to Ki no Uta, a Japanese manga series by Keiko Takemiya
- Kaze to Kumo to Niji to, a 1976 Japanese historical television series

== Music ==
- Kaze (band), Japanese pop music duo composed of Shōzō Ise and Kazuhisa Ōkubo
- Kaze (rapper), American hip hop artist from North Carolina
- "Kaze" (song), a Japanese nursery rhyme
- "Kaze", a 2004 song by Japanese pop singer Aya Ueto
- "Kaze ga Soyogu Basho", a 1999 song by Japanese pop singer Miho Komatsu
- "Kaze ni Kienaide", a 1996 song by Japanese rock band L'Arc-en-Ciel
