= Philipp Schaerer =

Swiss artist (born 1972)

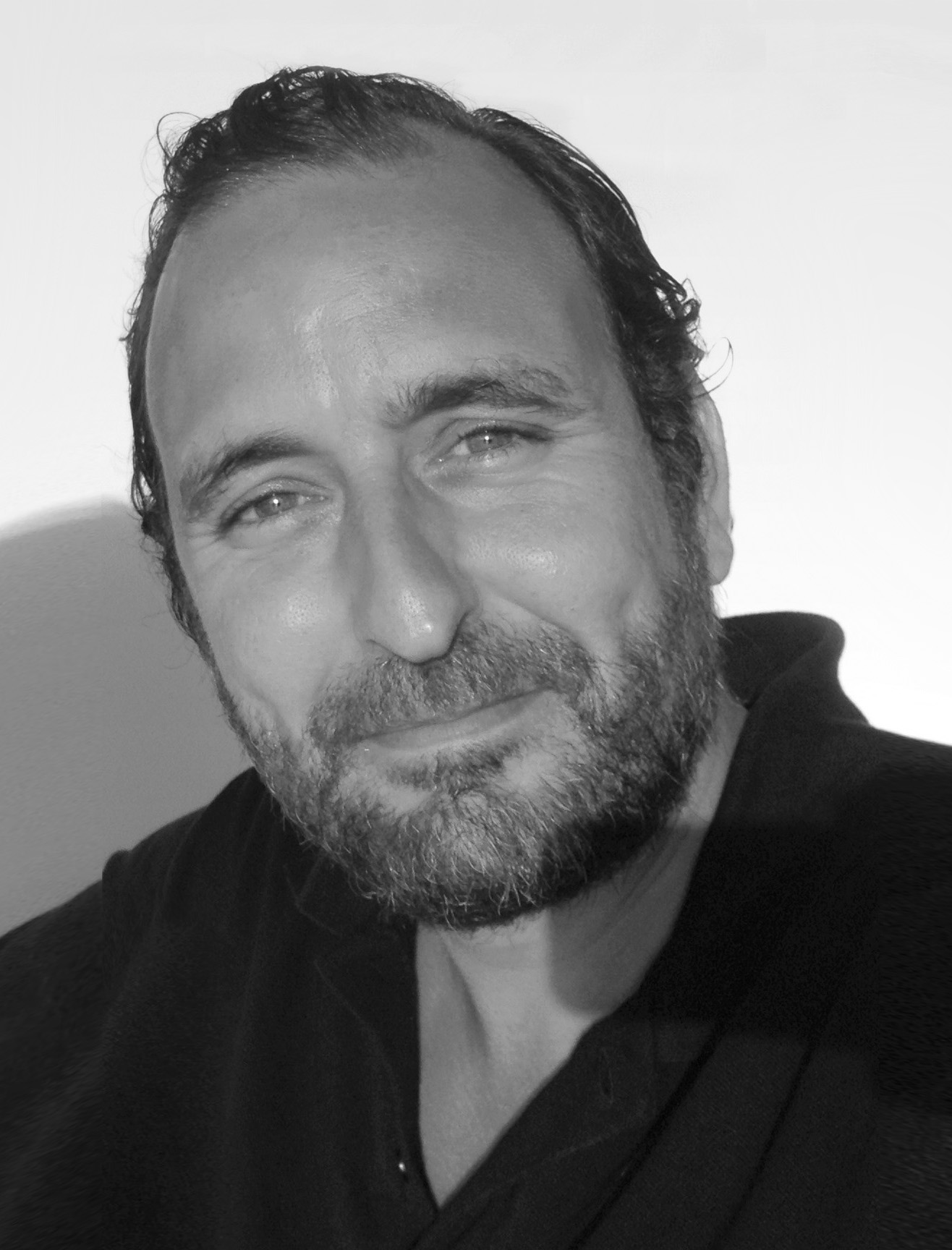
Philipp Schaerer

Philipp Schaerer (born 23 December 1972) is a Swiss artist known for his work in photography and computer art. His pieces are included in prestigious museum collections, including those at the Museum of Modern Art in New York, the Centre Pompidou in Paris, and the ZKM Center for Art and Media Karlsruhe, among others. Since 2014, Schaerer has served as a guest professor at the École Polytechnique Fédérale de Lausanne (EPFL), where he teaches digital design within the Department of Architecture's "Art and Architecture" program.

== Life ==
Philipp Schaerer was born in Zurich, Switzerland on 23 December 1972. He grew up in the cantons of Zurich and Bern, attending the gymnasium in Thun. From 1994 to 2000, he studied architecture at the École Polytechnique Fédérale de Lausanne (EPFL).

After completing his studies, Schaerer joined the Herzog & de Meuron architecture firm in Basel, where he produced visualizations for many of the firm’s notable projects. Starting in 2003, Schaerer assumed the role of Knowledge Manager at Herzog & de Meuron. Concurrently, from 2003 to 2008, he led the postgraduate program in Computer-Aided Architectural Design (CAAD) at the Department of Architecture at ETH Zurich.

Since 2008, Schaerer has worked as an independent artist and is currently based in Zurich and Steffisburg.

== Work ==
Schaerer's work explores the delicate relationship between objects and their pictorial representations, with information technology serving as a core element in his creative process. His engagement with digital processing techniques is central to his artistic practice. Through his art, he creates constructed image worlds that investigate the increasingly blurred boundary between digital imagery and physical objects.

Schaerer gained recognition with his first series, Bildbauten, which won the award for best independent work at the 2008 Swiss Photography exhibition and was subsequently exhibited internationally. This series marked a departure from the visual aesthetics he had previously created in the early 2000s for Herzog & de Meuron’s architectural competition entries. In Bildbauten, Schaerer assembles images from various surfaces, deliberately avoiding the allure of three-dimensionality, atmospheric lighting, and the inclusion of people. The works possess an independent existence; they are not representations of planned or completed buildings, yet they invite the viewer to believe they could exist in reality. Schaerer consciously plays with the illusion of photorealistic aesthetics or, at times, deconstructs them.

Schaerer's works are primarily digital creations, where he uses various techniques to construct virtual artifacts—objects, buildings, or landscapes. These digitally crafted realities achieve subtle coherence, merging subject and representation into evocative scenes that hover between reality and fiction. His digital image archive serves as the "raw material" for many of these works, providing an essential foundation for his image-based art.

Schaerer's art is held in numerous private and public collections, including the Museum of Modern Art (MoMA) in New York, the Centre Pompidou in Paris, the Museum of Contemporary Photography (MoCP) in Chicago, the ZKM Center for Art and Media Karlsruhe, and the Fotomuseum Winterthur. His works also feature in the collections of several Swiss art museums. In 2017, Schaerer contributed artistically to the Chicago Architecture Biennial, and in 2019, he participated in the Trienal de Arquitectura de Lisboa.

== Exhibitions (Selection) ==
- 2022: Philipp Schaerer. Dissected Nature, solo show, Kunstmuseum Olten, Switzerland
- 2021: Landscape – explored, interpreted, constructed, group show, Kunst im Trudelhaus, Baden, Switzerland
- 2021: The Closet. Phantoms of Reality, solo show, in collaboration with Reto Steiner, Satellit Art Space, Thun, Switzerland
- 2021: Memory – On memory and forgetting in unusual times, group show, Kunstmuseum Olten, Switzerland
- 2019: Offshoots, solo show, Aff Space, Bern, Switzerland
- 2019: The unobtrusive Beauty of the Banal: Anonymous architecture between reality and abstraction, solo show, Palacio del Condestable, Pamplona, Spain
- 2019: What is Ornament, group show, Trienal de Arquitectura de Lisboa, Culturgest, Lisbon, Portugal
- 2019: Fiction and Fabrication, group show, Museum of Art, Architecture and Technology MAAT, Lisbon, Portugal
- 2018: Coding The World, group show, Centre Pompidou, Paris, France
- 2018: Drifting Buildings, group show, Kunst Galerie Fürth, Fürth, Germany
- 2018: Infosphere, group show, Centro Nacional de las Artes CENART, Mexico City, Mexico
- 2017: Make New History: A Love of the World, group show, Chicago Architecture Biennial, Chicago Cultural Center, Chicago, USA
- 2015: Globale: Infosphere, group show, ZKM Center for Art and Media Karlsruhe (ZKM), Karlsruhe, Germany
- 2015: Endless House: Intersections of Art and Architecture, group show, Museum of Modern Art (MoMA), New York, USA
- 2013: Concrete: Architecture and Photography, group show, Fotomuseum Winterthur, Switzerland
- 2012: Obsessions, group show, La Filature, Mulhouse, France
- 2012: Transformator: Roger Boltshauser with images by Philipp Schaerer, group show, Architekturgalerie Berlin, Germany
- 2009: Bildbauten: Architectural imagery by Philipp Schaerer, solo show, Berlage Institute, Rotterdam, Netherlands
- 2009: All over the place, group show, New York Photo Festival, New York, USA

== Selected publications ==
Books

- Dominik Lengyel, Philipp Schaerer: Architectural fiction: Visualising new realities. In: Urs Hirschberg, Ludger Hovestadt, Oliver Fritz (Eds.): Atlas of Digital Architecture. 1st edition. Birkhäuser Verlag, Basel 2020, pp. 285–322.
- Philipp Schaerer: Free your Imagination. In: Andri Gerber, Ulrich Götz (Eds.): Architectonics of game spaces: The spatial logic of the virtual and its meaning for the real. Transcript Verlag, Bielefeld 2019, ISBN 978-3-8376-4802-7, pp. 95–110 (online).
- Stephan Lando, Marina Montresor (Eds.): Defining Criteria. Quart Verlag, Lucerne 2018, ISBN 978-3-03761-172-2 (German edition), ISBN 978-3-03761-173-9 (English edition), pp. 146–172.
- Jesús Vassallo (Ed.): Seamless: Digital Collage And Dirty Realism In Architecture. 1st edition. Park Books, Zurich 2016, ISBN 978-3-03860-019-0, pp. 69–112.
- Reto Geiser (Ed.): Philipp Schaerer: Bildbauten (expanded English edition). Standpunkte Verlag, Basel 2016, ISBN 978-3-9524577-0-2, 96 pages (with contributions by Nathalie Herschdorfer, Martino Stierli, and Philipp Ursprung).
- Philipp Schaerer: Objets Trouvés – The Beauty of Everyday Objects. LAPIS, École polytechnique fédérale de Lausanne (EPFL), Lausanne 2015, ISBN 978-3-9524577-0-2 (online).
- Ulrich Müller (Ed.): Transformator – Roger Boltshauser with images by Philipp Schaerer. Ernst Wasmuth Verlag, Tübingen 2012, ISBN 978-3-8030-0761-2.
- Reto Geiser (Ed.): Philipp Schaerer: Bildbauten. Standpunkte Verlag, Basel 2010, ISBN 978-3-9523540-4-9, 80 pages (with contributions by Nathalie Herschdorfer, Martino Stierli, and Philip Ursprung).

Articles and Essays

- Jesús Vassallo: Of Objects and Images. In: Oris. Nos. 124, 125, 2020, pp. 292–303.
- Maximilian Treiber: Types from the Reservoir. Image Pairs and Montage as Design Methodology in Architecture. In: Wolkenkuckucksheim. No. 38, 2019, pp. 100–101 (online).
- Jesús Vassallo: Epics in the everyday: Photography, architecture and the problem of realism. 1st edition. Park Books, Zurich 2019, pp. 303–307.
- Philipp Schaerer: Gebaute Bilder. In: Domus. German edition. No. 23, Ahead Media Verlag, Berlin January/February 2017, ISSN 2195-7681, pp. 154–159.
- Pedro Gadanho: Tableau Edifiant – Architectural Fiction in Contemporary Photography. In: DAMn°. No. 33, 2012, pp. 62–64.
- Philipp Schaerer: Bildkonstrukte: Architektur und Digitale Bildverfahren. In: Trans Magazin (ETH Zurich). No. 19, 2011, pp. 68–75.
- Marcella Aquila: Penetrable Buildings. In: FFWMAG. No. 24, 2011, pp. 36–43.
- Fanny Léglise: Philipp Schaerer. In: A'A – L'Architecture d'Aujourd'hui. No. 383, 2011, pp. 47–50.
- Jorge Nunes: Una Arcquitetos. Philipp Schaerer. In: J.A. No. 240, 2010, pp. 74–79.
- Jean Tourette: Philipp Schaerer: Photographie et Architecture Fictionelle. In: Kiblind. No. 33, 2010, pp. 12–13.
- Caroline Bouige: Quand le bâtiment. In: Étapes. No. 184, 2010, pp. 6–7.
- Eva Pelaez: Philipp Schaerer: A question of reality. In: Rooms Magazine. No. 3, 2010, pp. 82–83.
- Salomon Frausto: Bildbauten: Constructing Architectural Imagery. Philipp Schaerer. In: Hunch. Nai Publishers, Berlage Institute. No. 14, 2009, pp. 12–27.
- Sascha Renner: Glamour war gestern – Die Plat(t)form will Europas talentiertesten Fotonachwuchs finden. In: Monopol. No. 3, 2009, pp. 14–15.
- Martin Jäggi: Die Fotografie nimmt Abschied von alten Gewissheiten. In: Tages-Anzeiger. January 27, 2009, p. 41.
- Terri Peters: Philipp Schaerer talks about photographs, photorealism and the new "real". In: Mark. No. 15, pp. 144–151.
- Walter Keller: Bildbauten, Bilder von Philipp Schaerer. In: Du. No. 787, 2008, pp. 40–47.
