= Kagi (disambiguation) =

Kagi is a paid ad-free search engine.

Kagi may also refer to:

- Chiayi (also Kagi), a city in Taiwan
- KAGI, a radio station in Grants Pass, Oregon, United States
- Kagi, an uninhabited island in the Maldivian Kaafu Atoll
- Kagi chart, a chart used for tracking stock price movements
- John Henry Kagi (1835–1859), American attorney and abolitionist
- The Key (Tanizaki novel) (Japanese: 鍵, romanized: Kagi), first published in 1956
- Odd Obsession (Japanese: 鍵, romanized: Kagi), a 1959 Japanese satirical comedy drama film
- Kägi Söhne, a chocolate company

== See also ==
- Kage (disambiguation)
