= Gag Reflex (novel) =

2022 book by Elle Nash

- Cover of the first edition paperback of Gag Reflex by Elle Nash
- Author: Elle Nash
- Language: English
- Genre: Transgressive fiction Coming of age
- Publication date: April 12, 2022
- Publication place: United Kingdom
- Pages: 180
- ISBN: 978-1-955-90402-5

Gag Reflex is a 2022 novella by British-American author Elle Nash influenced by her experience with an eating disorder. The novella is said to be a spiritual prequel to Nash's previous novel Animals Eat Each Other in discussing adolescence and psychosexual themes. The novella is non-traditionally structured with a format of online posts. With non-internet media, images in the story are written with only their file names.

Nash said that the process of writing the novella was hard but inspired to channel her past traumas into something positive. The novella opens with two quotes from Frankenstein analogous to how an eating disorder creates a disassociation between the body, the self and the idea of disliking the body you were created in, as Nash describes. The nu metal song "Blood Pigs" by Otep comes up many times in the novella for its relevance to sexual trauma.

== Plot ==
Set in 2005, Lucy is an 18-year-old girl nearing her high-school graduation and currently lives in a trailer with her mother. The story is seen through the view of LiveJournal entries Lucy creates that primarily exist to track the calories she takes in each day while she struggles with anorexia. Her entries as seen by a small audience who share eating disorders and encourage self-destructive eating habits. They share voyeuristic fantasies of eating food but keeping each other sick. She is also having a relationship with two boys Brian and Mike who have sex with her while they cheat on their girlfriends.

== Reception ==
Gag Reflex was listed on transgressive fiction author Dennis Cooper's favorite media of 2022 on his personal blog. BuzzFeed News listed it as one of the 17 books from independent publishers to read in 2022. It received positive reviews from Punk Noir Magazine, The Rumpus, Dead End Follies, and The Observer. Emmeline Clein, author of book Dead Weight on the topic of eating disorders, stated she read Gag Reflex and explored eating disorder forums in research for her book.
