= Social Studies (2024 TV series) =

American documentary series

- Release poster
- Genre: Documentary
- Created by: Lauren Greenfield
- Directed by: Lauren Greenfield
- Music by: Volker Bertelmann
- Country of origin: United States
- Original language: English
- No. of episodes: 5

Production
- Executive producers: Lauren Greenfield; Frank Evers; Wallis Annenberg; Andrea Van Beuren; Regina K. Scully; Caryn Capotosto
- Producer: Frank Evers
- Cinematography: Bryan Donnell; Jerry Risius; Jenna Rosher
- Editors: Alyse Ardell Spiegel; Catherine Bull; Helen Kearns; Charles Little II; Lauren Saffa; Alex MacKenzie; Wes Lipman
- Running time: 56-66 minutes
- Production companies: Institute Pictures; Annenberg Foundation; Artemis Rising Foundation; Sustainable Films

Original release
- Network: FX
- Release: September 27 – October 18, 2024

Social Studies is an American documentary series created, directed, and produced by Lauren Greenfield. It follows teenagers over the course of a school year in Los Angeles, exploring how the generation has grown up online.

The series premiered at the 51st Telluride Film Festival on August 30, 2024, and premiered on September 27, 2024, on FX. It received positive reviews from critics.

== Premise ==
Over the course of a school year, the series explores Generation Z students in Los Angeles who deal with bullying, racism, beauty standards, and sexuality, specifically through the use of social media.

== Episodes ==
No.	Title	Directed by	Original release date	U.S. viewers (millions)
1	"Social Studies"	Lauren Greenfield	September 27, 2024	N/A
2	"Social Divisions"	Lauren Greenfield	September 27, 2024	N/A
3	"Peer/Algorithm Pressure"	Lauren Greenfield	October 4, 2024	0.086
4	"Sex Ed"	Lauren Greenfield	October 11, 2024	N/A
5	"Deletions and Culminations"	Lauren Greenfield	October 18, 2024	N/A

== Production ==
=== Development ===
Greenfield started developing the series during the COVID-19 pandemic when she noticed her teenage son having difficulties communicating with other kids in person.

=== Filming ===
Production on the series took place beginning in August 2021, at various high schools throughout Los Angeles including Archer School for Girls, Venice Skills Center, Palisades Charter High School, Los Angeles High School, and Hamilton High School, with 1,200 hours of footage over 150 days, including screen recordings of students phones. Greenfield was interested in seeing the impact of social media as schools re-opened after the COVID-19 pandemic.

== Reception ==
=== Critical response ===
On the review aggregator website Rotten Tomatoes, 100% of 9 critics' reviews are positive, with an average rating of 9/10. On Metacritic, it has a weighted average score of 81 out of 100 based on six reviews, indicating "universal acclaim".

Aramide Tinubu of Variety wrote: "Engrossing and troubling, the docuseries presents a time capsule of today while allowing the teens to speak for themselves." Richard Roeper of the Chicago Sun-Times praised the series writing: "The result is an instant time capsule that might leave you shaken at times, while other moments are truly inspirational and moving. On balance, though, what we witness is often more troubling and alarming than hopeful." Joel Keller of Decider suggested viewing the series writing: "The sheer volume of what Greenfield shows teens being up to will scare any parent more than any blood-and-guts show Ryan Murphy can come up with."

=== Accolades ===
Year	Award	Category	Nominee(s)	Result	Ref.
2025	Gotham TV Awards	Breakthrough Nonfiction Series	Lauren Greenfield and Frank Evers	Won	
2025	Independent Spirit Awards	Best New Non-Scripted or Documentary Series	Lauren Greenfield, Frank Evers, Wallis Annenberg, Regina K. Scully, Andrea van Beuren, and Caryn Capotosto	Nominated	
2025	Primetime Emmy Awards	Outstanding Documentary or Nonfiction Series	Lauren Greenfield, Frank Evers, Wallis Annenberg, Regina K. Scully, Andrea van Beuren, Caryn Capotosto, Julie Frankel, and Jennifer Kobzik	Nominated	
2025	19th Cinema Eye Honors	Outstanding Nonfiction Series	Lauren Greenfield and Frank Evers	Won	
2025	19th Cinema Eye Honors	Outstanding Outstanding Broadcast Editing	Alyse Ardell Spiegel, Helen Kearns, Catherine Bull, and Charles Little II	Won	
2025	19th Cinema Eye Honors	Outstanding Outstanding Broadcast Cinematography	Bryan Donnell, Jenna Rosher, and Jerry Risius	Nominated	
