= Nikanor Teratologen =

- Born: Niclas Lundkvist; 27 October 1964 (age 61); Kåge, Västerbotten, Sweden
- Occupations: Novelist, essayist, translator and literary critic
- Writing career
- Language: Swedish
- Period: 1992–

Nikanor Teratologen ("Nikanor the teratologist"), real name Niclas Lundkvist, born 27 October 1964 in Kåge, Västerbotten, is a Swedish novelist, essayist, translator and literary critic. His 1992 debut novel Assisted Living received considerable publicity in Sweden for its transgressive content and advanced use of language, which created a literary scandal and led to speculation about its author.

== Career ==
Nikanor Teratologen debuted in 1992 with the novel Assisted Living (Äldreomsorgen i Övre Kågedalen, lit. "The Elderly Care in Upper Kåge Valley"), written in local dialect and full of transgressive content such as pedophilia, incest, necrophilia, antisemitism, cannibalism and strong violence. The book was published through the major publisher Norstedts förlag and created a scandal. Due to the advanced use of language, several critics were convinced that the book was written by an established novelist from Västerbotten, and people such as Stig Larsson, Per Olov Enquist and Torgny Lindgren were mentioned as suspects. Eventually a journalist was able to identify the real author, which was followed by further rumours and speculation about Teratologen's interests and personality. The book eventually received cult status and had become a commercial success by the mid 2000s. It was published in English in 2012 through Dalkey Archive Press.

A sequel to Assisted Living, Förensligandet i det egentliga Västerbotten (lit. "The Growing Isolation in Västerbotten Proper"), was published in 1998. Teratologen has since published three additional books: Apsefiston (2002), Hebbershålsapokryferna (2002) and Att hata allt mänskligt liv (2009). He has described the poet Comte de Lautréamont as his "great precursor", and has also mentioned Friedrich Nietzsche as a major influence.

He has translated works by Nietzsche and Emil Cioran into Swedish. In 2010 he received the award Beskowska resestipendiet from the Swedish Academy.

== Bibliography ==
- Assisted Living (Äldreomsorgen i Övre Kågedalen) (1992)
- Förensligandet i det egentliga Västerbotten (1998)
- Apsefiston (2002)
- Hebbershålsapokryferna (2002)
- Att hata allt mänskligt liv (2009)
