= Patricia Marks Greenfield =

American psychologist and professor (born 1940)

- Born: Patricia Marks; July 18, 1940 (age 86); Newark, New Jersey, U.S.
- Education: Radcliffe College; Harvard University
- Occupations: Psychologist; professor
- Spouse: Sheldon Greenfield (m. 1965)
- Children: Lauren Greenfield; Matthew Greenfield
- Relatives: Frank Evers (son-in-law)

Patricia Marks Greenfield (born July 18, 1940) is an American psychologist and professor known for her research in the fields of culture and human development. She is a Distinguished Professor of Psychology at the University of California in Los Angeles and served as president of the International Association for Cross-Cultural Psychology from 2014–2016.

Greenfield has received numerous awards throughout her career. These include the American Psychological Association Urie Bronfenbrenner Award for Lifetime Contribution to Developmental Psychology in the Service of Science and Society in 2010 and the Society for Research in Child Development (SRCD) Award for Distinguished Contributions to Cultural and Contextual Factors in Child Development in 2013. She was selected as recipient of the Outstanding Contributions to Cultural Psychology Award from the International Association for Cross-Cultural Psychology in 2018. In 2019 she received the Ernst E. Boesch Prize from the German Society of Cultural Psychology, for major impact on cultural psychological research.

She received the American Association for the Advancement of Science Award for Behavioral Science Research for her 1991 paper titled Language, tools and brain: The ontogeny and phylogeny of hierarchically organized sequential behavior, which appeared in the journal Behavioral and Brain Sciences.

She was elected to the American Academy of Arts and Sciences in 2014.

== Early life and education ==
Greenfield was born in Newark, New Jersey, to David Marks Jr., an insurance agent, and Doris (née Pollard) Marks. She attended Radcliffe College from 1958 to 1962, and received an A.B. in Social Relations and was awarded membership in Phi Beta Kappa. She attended Harvard University from 1962 to 1963 and the Institute d'Etudes Pedagogues at the University of Dakar, Senegal from 1963 to 1964. Her graduate school advisor was Jerome Bruner. Greenfield received her Ph.D. from Harvard University in Social Psychology/Personality Research in 1966. In 1967, Greenfield received the First Award in the Creative Talent Awards Program of the American Institutes for Research for her dissertation entitled "Culture, concepts, and conservation: A comparative study of cognitive development in Senegal."

== Career ==
Greenfield is known for her cross-cultural work on child development and her exceptional teaching in the field of psychology. The numerous teaching awards she has received include the American Psychological Association Distinguished Scientist Lecturer (2013), American Psychological Foundation, Distinguished Teaching in Psychology Award, American Psychological Association (1992), and Society for the Teaching of Psychology (APA, Division 2) Teaching Award for 4-year Colleges and Universities (1986).

Greenfield was appointed Fellow of the Center for Advanced Study in the Behavioral Sciences, Stanford, California (2004-2005), National Endowment for the Humanities Fellow, Resident Scholar, School of American Research, Santa Fe (1999-2000), and Science Fellow of the Bunting Institute (1986-1987). She is a Fellow of the American Psychological Association, the American Psychological Society (renamed the Association for Psychological Science), the American Association of Applied Psychology, and the American Association for the Advancement of Science.

=== Research ===
Greenfield is known for her research relating to cultural psychology and change, inspired by 35 years of work in Chiapas, Mexico. She is interested in how culture influences human development and shapes the way individuals think. Greenfield was awarded the 2005 R. L. Shep Award for best book of the year for Weaving Generations Together: Evolving Creativity in the Maya of Chiapas. This work aimed to understand patterns of cultural inheritance across generations. More recently, her project titled Bridging Cultures looks at the cross cultural aspects of education and focusing primarily on Latino immigrants.

Greenfield's research, in collaboration with Joshua Smith, explored the structure of communication in early language development through diary reports and formal observations of two boys' usage of one-word verbal communication.

Another line of research addressed the question of whether cross-cultural differences undermine the validity of ability tests applied outside of their culture of origin. In her publication, You can't take it with you: Why ability assessments don't cross cultures, Greenfield discussed how to detect and adjust for cultural misunderstandings in assessments of intellectual ability.

Her book Mind and Media examined the effects of television, video games and computers on child development. In this volume, she debated how social media and television might impact a child's psychological understanding of their surroundings, which could motivate them to be more or less socially active.

Her research has been funded by many organizations including the National Science Foundation, The National Institute of Child Health and Human Development, the Spencer Foundation, the Markle Foundation, the Wenner-Gren Foundation, the Carnegie Foundation for the Advancement of Teaching, the Russell Sage Foundation, the Society for the Psychological Study of Social Issues (SPSSI), the Foundation for Psychocultural Research, and NATO.

== Personal life ==
Greenfield married physician Sheldon Greenfield in 1965, with whom she had two children, a daughter named Lauren, born in 1966, and a son named Matthew, born in 1968. Her brother is John Marks.
