= Object-oriented writing =

Literary and visual art practice

Object-oriented writing is a literary and visual art practice developed by the American writer Travis Jeppesen.

== Overview ==
The genesis of object-oriented writing was Jeppesen's desire to fuse the creative and critical aspects of literary work into a single hybrid form. In October 2011, Jeppesen published a text on his website describing object-oriented writing, a new form of writing he invented in response to these feelings of frustration over the stylistic limitations of contemporary art criticism. Over the next few years, Jeppesen worked on the development of object-oriented writing as a hybrid creative-critical practice. At its root, object-oriented writing attempts to re-create pre-existing works of art in the medium of language. The resulting texts often resemble prose poetry, though Jeppesen has also brought more traditional modes of narrative, as well as dramatic monologue, into the mix. In later essays, Jeppesen would characterize object-oriented writing as a "bad writing" or "wild writing" practice, in which failure was meant to not only be confronted, but incorporated into the final results, in line with what he has characterized as the innate impossibilities of writing to effectively convey meaning.

In its proposition of a metaphysics of art writing, object-oriented writing has often been compared to parallel developing movements in contemporary philosophy such as object-oriented ontology and speculative realism. In addition, the Swiss curator Hans Ulrich Obrist has drawn connections between object-oriented writing and Timothy Morton's notion of the hyperobject. Jeppesen himself has acknowledged these connections, yet claims that when he first coined the term object-oriented writing, he was unaware of these philosophical currents. It locates itself within the work of art, rather than outside, and attempts to infest the inanimate art object with human agency via the act of writing. Object-oriented writing has further been compared to nature poets' attempt to inhabit nature through language. Others have argued that "object-oriented writing is concerned with the distance between the writer and the object, a distance it tries to disavow."

As an avant-garde literary practice, object-oriented writing has also been compared to the nouveau roman and the antinovel. It has also been described as a cross-breed between "the Gertrude Stein of Tender Buttons, the Roland Barthes of Mythologies.

== 16 Sculptures ==
First edition

While he had published several texts of object-oriented writing previously on his website and in selected art and literary publications, 16 Sculptures is considered to be Jeppesen's first major work in the genre. 16 Sculptures was originally commissioned by curator Stuart Comer for the 2014 Whitney Biennial. 16 Sculptures manifested in the form of a book published by Publication Studio, but also an audio installation, in which visitors to the gallery sat in chairs and put on black glasses that blocked out their vision and listened to audio recordings—or "evocations"—of the texts on headphones. Jeppesen selected sixteen sculptures from throughout the history of art to re-create in the medium of language. The style of the resulting texts ranges considerably, including monologues, dialogues, rants, songs, poems, and epiphanies, among other, more hybrid or inventive forms, all of them evasive of the tropes of traditional art criticism. For example, in his re-creation of the Venus of Willendorf, Jeppesen adapts the dramatic monologue format, allowing the sculpture to speak.

After its debut in the Whitney Biennial, 16 Sculptures was the subject of a critically acclaimed solo exhibition at Wilkinson Gallery in London. 16 Sculptures has also been translated into Mandarin and was featured in a group exhibition in Beijing at the now-defunct Minority Space in 2017.

Reviewing Jeppesen's solo exhibition in Artforum, critic William J. Simmons characterized 16 Sculptures as "bitingly humorous, but nevertheless intensely critical," concluding "Jeppesen leaves us wondering who speaks for artworks and, perhaps more important, how they speak." Writing about the 2014 Whitney Biennial, the Bibliographical Society of America noted, "Jeppesen dematerialized the sculptures and brought them back into the realm of ideas."

== Other projects ==
Jeppesen has been working on an ongoing project, U, in which he applies object-oriented writing principles to cinema. Excerpts from U have appeared in Flash Art and Mousse. In addition, Jeppesen has discussed a project in which he approaches natural phenomena, namely glaciers, through object-oriented writing.
