= Kåge River =

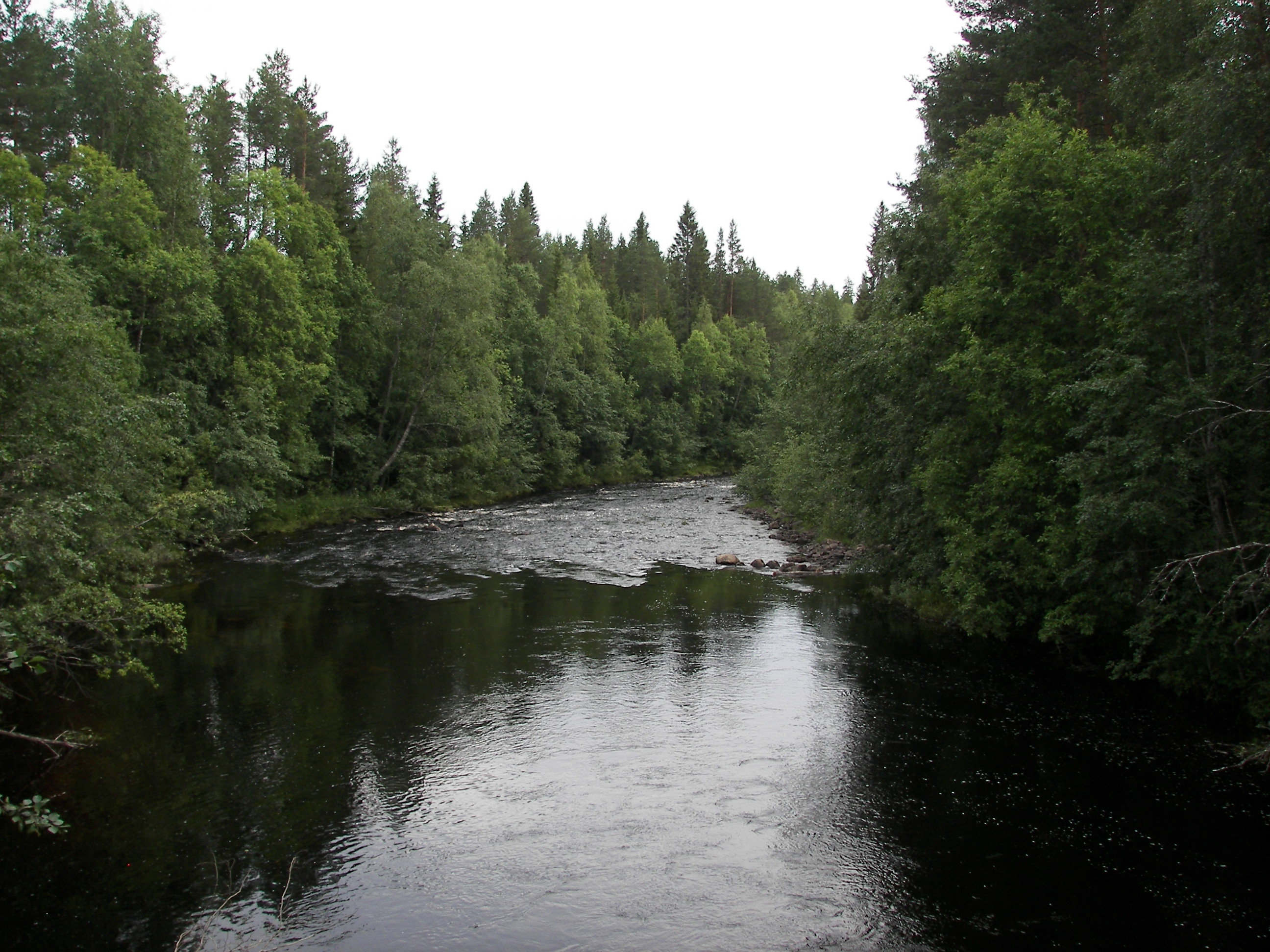
- Native name: Kågeälven (Swedish)

Location
- Country: Sweden
- County: Västerbotten

Physical characteristics
- Mouth: Bothnian Bay
  - location: Kåge, Skellefteå Municipality
  - coordinates: 64°49′50″N 21°00′45″E
  - elevation: 0 m (0 ft)
- Length: 70 km (43 mi)
- Basin size: 909.3 km^{2} (351.1 sq mi)

Kåge River (Swedish: Kågeälven) is a river in Sweden.
