= Matthew Stokoe =

British writer and screenwriter (born 1963)

- Born: 1963 (age 62–63); England
- Education: University of East London
- Occupations: Novelist; Screenwriter
- Writing career
- Period: 1998–present
- Genre: Transgressive fiction
- Notable works: Cows (1998); High Life (2002)
- Website: matthewstokoe.com

Matthew Stokoe (born 1963) is a British novelist and screenwriter. He is known for his brutal, noir, graphic and violent style of writing, generally regarded as part of the transgressive fiction genre.

== Biography ==
Stokoe was born in England and graduated from University of East London, where he studied economics. In the early 1980s he was the guitarist of the post-punk / gothic rock band Hack Hack, which was based in Ladbroke Grove, West London. The band released one vinyl EP in 1983, titled Despite Amputations. Stokoe has lived in Australia, New Zealand, and the United States (Santa Monica, California). As of 2024, he lives in Australia.

== Literary works ==
Stokoe's first novel, Cows, was published by Creation Books (London) in 1998. It was republished in 2011 by Akashic Books (New York). His second and third novels, High Life and Empty Mile, were both also published by Akashic Books. In 2014 Stokoe's third novel, Empty Mile, was nominated for the Grand Prix de Littérature Policière. His fourth novel, Colony of Whores, continued Stokoe's exploration of California's Hollywood underbelly begun in his second novel, High Life.

Stokoe's books have been reviewed both favorably and unfavorably by numerous publications. Stokoe's books have been translated and published in French, Spanish, Russian, and German. Stokoe has also written several screenplays, including an unproduced adaptation of Simon Mackie's comic strip Flick and Jube.

== Bibliography ==
=== Novels ===
- Stokoe, Matthew (1998). Cows. London, United Kingdom: Creation Books. ISBN 978-1-84068-005-8.
- Stokoe, Matthew (2002). High Life. New York, United States: Akashic Books. ISBN 978-1-888451-32-0.
- Stokoe, Matthew (2010). Empty Mile. New York, United States: Akashic Books. ISBN 978-1-936070-12-1.
- Stokoe, Matthew (2014). Colony of Whores. Sydney, Australia: Matthew Stokoe. ISBN 978-0-9874536-4-8.

=== Film scripts ===
- Rock. Directed by Brian Challis, 2003.
- Dog. Directed by Paul Kwiatkowski, 2006.
