= Elle Nash =

American editor and author

Ellie Nash
- Nash in 2024
- Born: England
- Education: Pursuing a PhD in Creative Writing at the University of Glasgow
- Notable work: Deliver Me, Nudes (2021), Gag Reflex (novel), Animals Eat Each Other
- Children: 1
- Website: https://www.ellenash.net/

Elle Nash is a British-American editor and author based in Glasgow, Scotland. She is best known for her debut novella Animals Eat Each Other. Nash writes about working-class characters and narratives and has criticized mainstream literature for ignoring those narratives and perpetuating the false idea of class mobility. Her writing generally revolves around women, psychosexual transgressive themes, eating disorders, and other self-destructive behavior.

== Life ==
Nash was born in England but moved to the United States at a young age. Nash lived in Denver, Colorado during the years 2015 and 2016. She had a daughter with her husband in 2016. She formerly lived in northwest Arkansas until 2019 at the latest. This duration of time helped inspire her novel Deliver Me. She first visited Glasgow during her 2018 tour for Animals Eat Each Other.

== Work ==
Nash's I Can Remember the Meaning of Every Tarot Card But I Can’t Remember What I Texted You Last Night is her first published work. It was a poetry collection published with Nostrovia Press. Nash's debut novella Animals Eat Each Other was published in 2018 by Dzanc Books. In 2021 she released a short story collection, Nudes, through Hobart Pulp. A short story collection named Little Birds was also published by Filthy Loot collaborated indie literature authors such as herself, Sam Pink, Nate Lippens, Shane Jesse Christmas, Brian Alan Ellis, and G.C.McKay. A novella, Gag Reflex, told in the form of a LiveJournal was published by Clash Books in 2022. Deliver Me, her second novel, was published by Unnamed Press in 2023. Shortly after the release of Deliver Me, Nash said she is looking on vampire lore and Mary Shelley, but is generally unspoken on her ideas for her next novel.

Nash also works as an editor, and is co-founder of the literary magazine Witch Craft Magazine, and is a fiction editor at Hobart Pulp.

=== Writing style ===
Nash has been asked on her novels or excerpts reading as confessional or autofictional. Nash states, that she indeed bases some work off her experiences, but feels as soon as she writes it down, it creates a separation between fiction and herself. Nash states her inspirations are Chuck Palahniuk, Francesca Lia Block, Tom Spanbauer, Marya Hornbacher, Dennis Cooper, and contemporary Charlene Elsby. In 2013, Nash took a writing class hosted by Spanbauer. When writing about sex, Nash stated in 2020 she focuses most on the emotional content while trying not to overuse anatomical terms: "The English language is so clumsy when it comes to talking about sex." Nash describes the transgressive fiction genre as exploring how the boundaries of social expectations and morals can be violated. Additionally, Nash calls the horror genre the most expressive and malleable in fiction.

== Bibliography ==
- I Can Remember the Meaning of Every Tarot Card But I Can’t Remember What I Texted You Last Night - Nostrovia! Press, 2016
- AVOKA - Ghost City Press, 2017
- Animals Eat Each Other - Dzanc Books, 2018
- Nudes - SF/LD Books, 2021
- Gag Reflex - Clash Books, 2022
- Deliver Me - Unnamed Press, 2023
