= Kids + Money =

- Directed by: Lauren Greenfield
- Written by: Lauren Greenfield
- Production company: Evergreen Pictures
- Release date: 2008
- Running time: 32 minutes
- Country: United States

kids + money, a 2008 cinéma vérité documentary film, was directed by photographer/filmmaker Lauren Greenfield and produced by Evergreen Pictures. The 32 minute film includes interviews with Los Angeles teenagers on the subject of money and how it affects their lives. HBO licensed North American broadcast rights to kids + money, and the film has been distributed to major broadcasters and cable networks internationally. An educational DVD is being distributed by Bullfrog Films.

The characters in the film are: 16-year-old Gabby, for whom shopping is a hobby and fashion a means of self-expression; 17-year-old Sean Michael, from a middle-class family who has to work to support his shopping habits; 17-year-old Emmanuel, who discusses his relationship to money and how he fits in at his school, Harvard-Westlake; Matthew, a child actor; and 17-year-old Zoie, who lives with her parents in a small one-bedroom apartment.

kids + money, was selected as one of the top five nonfiction shorts in the world by Cinema Eye Honors 2009. The short also won the Audience Award for Best Short Film at the AFI Film Festival 2007, the Michael Moore Award for Best Documentary Film at the 2008 Ann Arbor Film Festival, the Gold Plaque, Documentary:Social/Political from The Hugo Television Awards 2008, and Best Documentary Short at Kids First Film Festival 2008. kids + money was also selected into the Official Shorts Program at the Sundance Film Festival (January 2008).
