= Travis Jeppesen =

American writer

- Born: Fort Lauderdale, Florida, U.S.
- Education: The New School; Royal College of Art (PhD)
- Occupations: Novelist; playwright; poet; artist; art critic

Travis Jeppesen is an American novelist, playwright, poet, artist, and art critic. He is known, among other works, for his novels Settlers Landing and The Suiciders; a non-fiction novel about North Korea, See You Again in Pyongyang; and for his object-oriented writing work, 16 Sculptures. He has been hailed by Pulitzer Prize winning novelist Joshua Cohen as "the bard of American exile," extending the Modernist tradition of expatriate writing into the twenty-first century. For his art criticism, Jeppesen has been awarded an Andy Warhol Foundation Arts Writers Grant and the Hyundai Artlab Editorial Fellowship.

== Life and career ==
Travis Jeppesen was born in Fort Lauderdale, Florida, and grew up in Charlotte, North Carolina. As a teenager, he studied writing under the playwright Naomi Iizuka. He later attended college at The New School, where he studied literature and philosophy. Upon graduation, he moved to Europe in 2001.

Jeppesen's first novel, Victims, was selected by Dennis Cooper to debut his Little House on the Bowery series for Akashic Books in 2003; a Russian translation of the novel was published in 2005 by Eksmo. Written in a Southern Gothic vein, the novel is inspired in part by the UFO religious cult Heaven's Gate, which he researched extensively while working on the book. With its use of multiple narrators, dark absurdist comedy, and what Michael Miller, writing for the Village Voice, deemed its "schizophrenic logic" and "gleefully unique syntax," critics compared the novel's style to authors as diverse as William Faulkner, Kathy Acker, and Jean-Paul Sartre.

Jeppesen followed Victims with a collection of poetry, Poems I Wrote While Watching TV. It was described by one critic as "synesthetic, kinetic poems hypersaturated with mass culture images, delivered in a tone that manages to sound simultaneously surreal and conversational." A second collection, Dicklung & Others, appeared in November 2009. That year, his play Daddy premiered at Hebbel am Ufer in Berlin, starring Vaginal Davis.

Jeppesen's second novel, Wolf at the Door (Twisted Spoon Press), was completed during a residency at the Slovene Writers' Association in Ljubljana, and appeared in 2007. The book consists of two separate plot lines that never intersect. One concerns an aging artist suffering from a terminal illness who has removed himself to a small cabin to live out his final days, his sole contact being with a deaf-mute gravedigger with whom he is unable to effectively communicate. The second story centers on the nocturnal wanderings of a former porn star, who may or may not be a serial killer, in an unnamed Eastern European city. With its morbid themes and depictions of violence, the novel alienated many readers. Others, such as the writer Noah Cicero, championed the novel for its originality, dark humor, and linguistic ingenuity. "Toward the end," wrote another critic, "this unique style has a huge pay-off when the author, having established the reader’s context, liberates the prose from conventions and pushes toward the unknown with experiments in language. At times the novel disintegrates into an associative prose that is so fragmented it must be read aloud."

Jeppesen's third novel, The Suiciders, is considered by many to be his wildest book, with "writing that can go almost anywhere at any time," in the words of Blake Butler, though it can also be considered as a 21st-century continuation of the grotesque body tradition of Gargantua and Pantagruel and Don Quixote. Subsequent to its publication, he performed “marathon readings” of the entire novel, lasting eight hours without pause, at the Institute of Contemporary Arts in London and the Whitney Museum of American Art in New York.

Jeppesen's critical writings on art, film, and literature have appeared in Artforum, Art in America, Texte zur Kunst, Flash Art, New York Press, Bookforum, The Stranger, and Zoo Magazine. He is the recipient of a 2013 Arts Writers Grant from Creative Capital/the Warhol Foundation. A collection of his art criticism, Disorientations, was published in 2008; subsequently, Jeppesen launched disorientations.com, a "one-man art magazine." As of 2020, Disorientations also includes links to Jeppesen's published art reviews and essays online, as well as miscellaneous poetry, fiction, and essays he has written, much of it previously only available in print form.

In October 2011, Jeppesen announced that he would be shifting the focus of the website to explore his notion of object-oriented writing, a new form of writing he invented in response to his feelings of frustration over traditional art criticism. Over the next few years, Jeppesen worked on the development of object-oriented writing as a hybrid creative-critical practice. In its proposition of a metaphysics of art writing, object-oriented writing could be thought of as a parallel creative practice to object-oriented ontology and speculative realism. It locates itself within the work of art, rather than outside, and attempts to infest the inanimate art object with human agency via the act of writing. In 16 Sculptures, Jeppesen re-created sixteen sculptures, from throughout the history of art, in the medium of language. The texts' style range from monologues, dialogues, rants, songs, poems, and epiphanies, among other, more hybrid or inventive forms, all of them evasive of the tropes of traditional art criticism. 16 Sculptures manifested in the form of a published book, but also an audio installation, in which visitors to the gallery sat in chairs and put on black glasses that blocked out their vision and listened to audio recordings—or "evocations"—of the texts on headphones. Early on in the project, Jeppesen also intended a limited edition vinyl release consisting of sixteen records, but to date this has not happened. In 2014, 16 Sculptures was featured in the Whitney Biennial and in a solo exhibition at Wilkinson Gallery in London. Excerpts from 16 Sculptures, translated into Mandarin, were recorded and featured in a group exhibition in Beijing.

Shortly thereafter, Jeppesen began exhibiting his calligraphic work on paper widely in exhibitions throughout Europe and Asia. While this work is presented in traditional art world contexts (galleries and museums), Jeppesen insists that these works are instances of writing "in the expanded field."

In addition to his object-oriented writing and calligraphic works, Jeppesen continued to write fiction. 2014 saw the publication of All Fall, which consisted of two novellas: "Written in the Sky," an invocation of a plane crashing in slow motion (that Jeppesen allegedly wrote on a red-eye flight from Beijing to Vienna in the fall of 2012); and "White Night," described as a "thoughtscape" of the philosopher Gilles Deleuze in the moments preceding his suicide on November 4, 1995. The book was officially published on November 4, 2014, to commemorate Deleuze's death.

An itinerant traveler, Jeppesen made his first visit to North Korea in 2012. His fascination with the country led him to enroll in a Korean language program at Kim Hyong Jik University in Pyongyang in 2016, becoming the first American in history to ever study at a North Korean university. Between 2012 and 2017, Jeppesen made five visits to North Korea, and was one of the last Americans to visit before the United States instituted a travel ban to the country. Jeppesen wrote a non-fiction novel based on his experiences, See You Again in Pyongyang, which was published in 2018. He has also written about North Korea for The New York Times, The Wall Street Journal, the New York Daily News, Artforum, and Art in America.

He has taught as a visiting tutor in the art department at Goldsmiths University and as a visiting lecturer in Critical Writing in Art and Design at the Royal College of Art, where he completed his PhD in 2016. His PhD thesis, ‘’Towards a 21st Century Expressionist Art Criticism’’, took an activist approach to its subject, arguing for a return to art criticism’s roots as an essentially creative, literary discipline. A revised version of the thesis was later published in the form of a collection of essays and “ficto-criticism,” Bad Writing. In 2019, he moved to Shanghai, where he taught at the Institute for Cultural and Creative Industry at Shanghai Jiaotong University. In 2022, Jeppesen announced his resignation from his academic post, following the harsh measures of the COVID-19 lockdown in Shanghai. Jeppesen returned to his long-term home in Berlin in 2023, where his newest play, Ghosts of the Landwehr Canal, was premiered.

In 2024, Jeppesen was named Senior Web Editor of Artforum. He resigned from the position in May 2025.

== Settlers Landing ==
In 2023, his novel Settlers Landing was published. The culmination of eleven or twelve years of work, the novel, at 836 pages, is Jeppesen's longest book. The novel, about a billionaire who buys a private island with the intention of starting his own country, is a parable of twenty-first century colonialism, and features such inventions as a talking dog, dodgy real estate developers, fugitive rap stars, an infinite release opioid manufactured by North Korea, and a lawyer loosely based on Roy Cohn.

Miles Pflanz, writing for the Whitney Review of New Writing, applauded the novel for its "Tolstoy-televisual detail that gives the novel a naturalistic edge and grounds in the plausible the spectacular excess. But the strongest moments hinge on Jeppesen’s talent for dialogue. In lengthy passages of it, he brings humane insight into bit characters, dispatching the reader into the nebulous consequences of contemporary anomie. If there is a moral vision that elevates Jeppesen’s farce, it’s in these conversations where characters grapple with the meaning of their pain and perseverance before an inevitable crash and burn into catty obscenity. Their inabilities to imagine a path out of their respective quagmires lead to schizo neologisms — algorithmic colonialism and necro-phallic accelerationism among them — that propel the plot through dizzying descriptions of Shinjuku sex clubs, harsh noise-rap, and opioid-fueled assault-gun pump frenzy."

== Novels ==
- Victims (2003, Akashic; ISBN 9781888451429 / 2015, ITNA; ISBN 1888451424)
- Wolf at the Door (2007, Twisted Spoon; ISBN 8086264297)
- The Suiciders (2013, Semiotext(e); ISBN 978-1584351252)
- All Fall: Two Novellas (2014, Publication Studio; ISBN 9781624620713)
- Settlers Landing (2023, ITNA Press; ISBN 9780997643282)

== Poetry ==
- Poems I Wrote While Watching TV (2006, BLATT Books; ISBN 978-1599713403)
- Dicklung & Others (2009, BLATT Books; ISBN 978-0982194522)

== Graphic novels ==
- Siilky's Room: Outside an anthology of new horror fiction. With art by Winston Chimielinski (2017)

== Nonfiction ==
- Disorientations: Art on the Margins of the Contemporary (2008, Social Disease; ISBN 978-0955282980)
- See You Again in Pyongyang (2018, Hachette; ISBN 978-0316509152)
- Bad Writing (2019, Sternberg; ISBN 978-3956794100)

Disorientations was named Nonfiction Book of the Year by 3am Magazine.

== Object-oriented writing ==
- 16 Sculptures (2014, Publication Studio; ISBN 9781624620553)

== Plays ==
- Daddy (Hebbel am Ufer, Berlin, 2009)
- Ghosts of the Landwehr Canal (Berliner Ringtheater, Berlin, 2013)

== Solo exhibitions ==
- Travis Jeppesen: Word (Rupert, Vilnius, 2016)
- Travis Jeppesen: New Writing (Exile, Berlin, 2016)
- Travis Jeppesen: 16 Sculptures (Wilkinson Gallery, London, 2014)

== Group exhibitions ==
- Liquid Ground (Para Site, Hong Kong, 2021 and UCCA Dune, Beidaihe, 2022-2023)
- All I Think About is You (Galerie Nothelfer, Berlin, 2021)
- Caspar (Sgomento Zurigo, Zurich, 2020)
- The Critic as Artist (Reading International, Reading, 2017)
- Post-Production Manoeuvre (Minority Space, Beijing, 2017)
- South of Meaning (House of Egorn, Berlin, 2016)
- The Green Ray (Wilkinson Gallery, London, 2016)
- International Exhibition of Modern Designs on Ink Painting (Beijing Design Week, Beijing, 2016)
- Dietmar Lutz, André Niebur, Travis Jeppesen (2nd Floor Projects, San Francisco, 2016)
- Everything Must Go (Circus of Books, Los Angeles, 2016)
- Melancholy & Raving Madness (Royal College of Psychiatry, London, 2015)
- Down Where Changed (Cubitt, London, 2014-2015)
- Cucumber Bones (Toves, Copenhagen, 2014)
- Whitney Biennial (Whitney Museum of American Art, New York, 2014)
- House Style (Tramway, Glasgow, 2013)

== Interviews ==
- with Ben Shields, LA Review of Books
- with T. Cole Rachel, 3ammagazine.com
- with Slava Mogutin, The Whitney Review of New Writing
- with Thomas Moore, The Fanzine
- with Oskar Oprey, 3ammagazine.com
- with Paul Semel, paulsemel.com
- with Laura Albert, A Shaded View on Fashion
- with Ajay RS Hothi, Tank
- with Hans-Ulrich Obrist, Sleek
- with Danny Calvi, Butt Magazine
- with Stefanie Wenner, Disorientations
- with Andrew Gallix, 3ammagazine.com
- with Drew Zeiba, KGB Bar Lit
