= The Suiciders =

2013 novel by Travis Jeppesen

- First edition
- Author: Travis Jeppesen
- Cover artist: Bjarne Melgaard
- Language: English
- Publisher: Semiotext(e)
- Publication date: 2013
- Publication place: United States
- Media type: Print
- Pages: 232
- ISBN: 9781584351252

The Suiciders is a 2013 novel by Travis Jeppesen. Jeppesen's experimental, non-linear narrative novel is about a group of queer squatters who declare war against their own minds and embark upon a road trip to the end of the world. The work was described by the publisher as a "post-punk nouveau roman". In his review of the book, the novelist Blake Butler described the novel as such: "There are 10,000 plots per page. It is in the accumulation of the plots, and the fantastic charging of Jeppesen's total mish-mash of syntax, physics, framing, voice, and possibility, that keeps you reading." Another critic assessed the novel as "shocking, funny, and thought-provoking...a piece of abstract visual art, but constructed with words".

Shortly after the novel was published, Jeppesen twice performed "marathon readings" of the entire book without pause for over eight hours. The first reading took place in London at the Institute of Contemporary Arts, while the second was held in New York at the Whitney Museum of Art.

The cover art of the novel's first edition was created by the Norwegian artist Bjarne Melgaard.
