= New York Photo Festival =

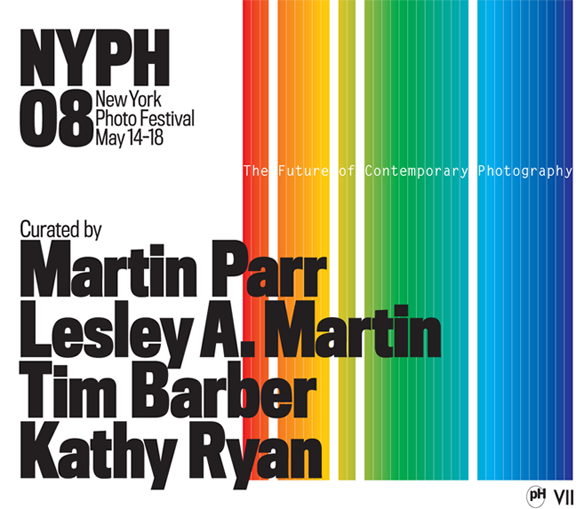
New York Photo Festival 2008 logo

The New York Photo Festival was founded in January 2007 by Frank Evers and Daniel Power in an effort to establish a U.S. photo festival dedicated to the "future of contemporary photography" and to the exposure of new works of the photo company. It takes place every year in mid-May over a period of four to five days in Dumbo, Brooklyn.

== History ==
The inaugural event took place on May 14–18, 2008 and was attended by 15,000 people. It was curated by Martin Parr, Lesley A. Martin, Tim Barber and Kathy Ryan.
