= Deliver Me (novel) =

2023 novel by British-American author Elle Nash

- First edition hardcover of Deliver Me by Elle Nash
- Author: Elle Nash
- Language: English
- Genre: Transgressive fiction
- Publisher: Unnamed Press
- Publication date: October 3, 2023
- Pages: 284
- ISBN: 978-1-951-21371-8

Deliver Me is a 2023 novel by British-American author Elle Nash. It discusses motherhood under capitalism, how society treats pregnancy, reduction of women to reproductive functions, and mental illness. Nash states the novel took two weeks to plan and eleven weeks to write the first draft.

Nash says her time living in the American south, specifically northern Arkansas, helped inspire the book. The specific inspiration Nash cites was Dynel Lane's 2015 crime that occurred while she was living in Colorado. Dynel Lane attacked a 7-month-pregnant Michelle Wilkins and removed her fetus, then pretended to be pregnant for nine months. Nash additionally cites the story of Lisa Montgomery, who murdered and cut out the fetus of 8-month-pregnant Bobbie Stinnett, and the experience of working while she was pregnant herself.

The novel is structured in three parts, labeled from the first to the third trimester, accompanying an image of a fetus that grows smaller. Nash created a music playlist of 35 songs accompanying the novel after writing the first few drafts.

== Plot ==
"Dee-Dee," whose real name is Daisy, is a secretly queer young woman who works in a chicken meat packing facility in Missouri and has a boyfriend whom she calls "Daddy." He has a sexual attraction to insects and watches true crime. Dee-Dee is obsessed with the idea of being pregnant, and she and her boyfriend have been unsuccessfully trying after five miscarriages. Sloane, a childhood friend and crush of Dee-Dee, moves into the apartment above her and is pregnant. Later, Dee-Dee is finally pregnant but fails again to keep it to term, so she lies about still being pregnant.

== Reception ==
Deliver Me received positive reviews from Publishers Weekly, Kirkus Reviews, Big Issue, Fangoria, and Dead End Follies. On Medium, the online publishing platform, Zachary Houle describes it as daring while saying the religious aspects are unneeded. Eric LaRocca, author of Things Have Gotten Worse Since We Last Spoke, described it as "Shocking and unforgettable."

It has been longlisted for the 2024 Saltire Society Fiction Book of the Year. It was nominated for 2023 Larry Prater Award for Best Read. It was mentioned in the 2025 issue of Montstrum focusing on vegan and animal liberation horror, a peer-reviewed journal in horror studies.
