= Animals Eat Each Other =

2018 novel by Elle Nash

- Author: Elle Nash
- Language: English
- Published: 2018
- Publisher: Dzanc Books
- Publication place: United States
- Pages: 121
- ISBN: 9781938604430
- OCLC: 1050453810

Animals Eat Each Other is the debut novel by American writer Elle Nash published in the U.S. in 2018 by Dzanc Books and in 2019 by 404 Ink in the U.K. Set in early 2005, the novel follows an unnamed narrator who becomes involved in a sadomasochistic relationship with Frankie and Matt, a couple who are new parents.

Nash's 2022 novel Gag Reflex is a prequel to Animals Eat Each Other. Nash states that she was inspired to write about drug culture by Irvine Welsh's short story collection Ecstasy. The concept was intended to be a short story created for an online writing workshop hosted by Rae Gouriand. The novel was initially planned to come out in 2017. Nash created a 10 song music playlist accompanying the novel.

== Plot ==
After graduating high school the narrator, who lives in a trailer with her mother, begins to work at a Radio Shack. A co-worker introduces her to Frankie and Matt, a couple the narrator's age, who are new parents. Frankie gives the narrator the nickname of Lilith, after Adam's first wife. Lilith begins sleeping with the couple, mostly having violent sex with Matt while Frankie watches. After a few months she develops a crush on Matt and Matt and Lilith begin seeing each other in private.

At the same time as she is involved with Matt and Frankie, Lilith is involved in several other sexual relationships including sleeping with her boss and her co-worker. She also begins a flirtation with Matt's friend Patrick. When Patrick's girlfriend discovers the affair she tells Frankie who orders Matt to break up with Lilith.

Lilith spends the time after the breakup mourning her relationship with Matt and having sex with Jenny. Three months later Matt reaches out to her after Frankie is arrested for domestic violence. Lilith has sex with him the first time without Frankie there but when the condom they are using breaks Lilith notices a coldness between them. She takes the morning after pill to prevent a pregnancy and afterwards receives calls from both Frankie and Matt calling her derogatory names and breaking up with her for good.

== Reception ==
The novel received positive reviews. The Masters Review called Nash "a voice on the rise." Zyzzyva praised the novel's "rich details". Publishers Weekly also named Nash a writer to watch in Spring of 2018 and called the book 'a complex, impressive exploration of obsession and desire' in its starred review. O, The Oprah Magazine featured the book in its top ten 2018 summer reads list, and Autostraddle called it one of 55 books with the 'best lesbian sex scenes' and shown in a list of 17 books that have "weird" narrators in another article.

The novel was an inspiration for Genevieve Jagger's novel Fragile Animals. Genevieve Jagger is a friend of Elle Nash and formerly took her writing classes.
