= Hobart (magazine) =

American literary magazine

- Hobart 12 cover
- Editor: Aaron Burch
- Categories: Literary magazine
- First issue: 2001
- Country: United States
- Based in: Thousand Oaks, CA
- Website: www.hobartpulp.com
- ISSN: 1544-788X
- OCLC: 52253587

Hobart is an American literary magazine that publishes fiction, poetry, interviews, and essays. Founded as an online magazine in 2001, Hobart grew into a biannual print magazine in 2003. The founding editor was Aaron Burch. Past issues have been dedicated to topics such as luck, the outdoors, and games. In addition to print and web content, in 2006 Hobart added a book division (Short Flight/Long Drive Books), with Elizabeth Ellen as editor. In October 2022, Burch and most of the editors resigned after Ellen published an interview with writer Alex Perez who criticized elitism, "wokeness" and other issues in the literary world.

Several pieces appearing in Hobart have received awards or were selected for anthologies: recent selections include Roxane Gay's story “North Country” and Mike Meginnis' “Navigators” that were selected for The Best American Short Stories 2012 .

== Short Flight/Long Drive Books ==
Short Flight/Long Drive Books is an independent small press specializing in the publication of fiction. A division of Hobart, Short Flight/Long Drive Books was founded in 2006 with Elizabeth Ellen as editor.

=== Noted publications ===
- Martin, Chelsea (2013). Even Though I Don't Miss You. Short Flight/Long Drive Books. ISBN 978-0-9896950-0-8.
- Ellen, Elizabeth (2012). Fast Machine. Short Flight/Long Drive Books. ISBN 978-0982530177.
- Stoner, Jess (2012). I Have Blinded Myself Writing This. Short Flight/Long Drive Books.
- Nice, Dylan (2012). Other Kinds. Short Flight/Long Drive Books. ISBN 978-0-9825301-9-1.
- Greenfeld, Karl Taro (2011). NowTrends. Short Flight/Long Drive Books. ISBN 978-0-9825301-5-3.
- Miller, Mary (2009). Big World. Short Flight/Long Drive Books. ISBN 978-0-9749541-8-9.
- Novy, Adam (2010). The Avian Gospels. Short Flight/Long Drive Books. ISBN 978-0-9825301-4-6.
- Lutz, Garielle (2021). Worsted. Short Flight/Long Drive Books. ISBN 978-0-9964949-2-2.
