= Elizabeth Ellen =

American writer

- Born: April 19, 1969 (age 57)
- Occupations: author, editor
- Writing career
- Notable works: Fast Machine, Person/a
- Website: www.elizabethellen.net

Elizabeth Ellen (born April 19, 1969) is an American author and editor living in Ann Arbor, Michigan.

She is the author of the collection of short stories Fast Machine, Before You She Was A Pitbull, poetry collection Bridget Fonda, and the novel Person/a. Her work has appeared in American Short Fiction, McSweeney's, Muumuu House, and Harper's Magazine. She was awarded a Pushcart Prize for her story "Teen Culture," which appeared in American Short Fiction in 2012.

Ellen is the editor of Hobart and Short Flight/Long Drive Books

== Bibliography ==
- Before You She Was A Pitbull – Future Tense, 2007 ISBN 978-0060510299
- Bridget Fonda – Dostoyevsky Wannabe, 2015 ISBN 978-1518868467
- Saul Stories - SF/LD Books, 2017 ISBN 0989695050
- Person/a - SF/LD Books, 2017 ISBN 978-0989695060
- Elizabeth Ellen (Poems) - SF/LD Books, 2018 ISBN 978-0-9896950-7-7
- Dear Nico - SF/LD Books, 2022
- Estranged - Far West Press, 2023
- American Thighs - Clash Books, 2025
