= Kaze Green Economy =

- Industry: Cooking fuel
- Founded: 2017; 9 years ago
- Headquarters: Bujumbura, Burundi
- Kaze Green Economy Facotry in Bujumbura (Burundi)
- Website: www.kazegreeneconomy.com

Kaze Green Economy, or KAGE, is a social enterprise that manufactures wood and charcoal substitutes from biodegradable waste. It has facilities in Gitega and Bujumbura, Burundi.

== Background ==
Wood, as firewood or charcoal, is the main source of energy for cooking in Burundi, and accounts for 95% of the country's energy consumption. A 2021 report noted that at current rates of forest clearance Burundi would have no forest cover left in 25 to 33 years.

== Products ==
Kaze Green Economy converts biodegradable waste into two products: KABIOF (Kaze Bio Fuel) Makara and KABIOF Rukwi. KABIOF Rukwi is a substitute for firewood and KABIOF Makara is a substitute for charcoal. The company also makes safe and energy efficient cooking stoves from recycled plastic and metal waste.

Maize stalks are collected from households and dumps, dried to remove all moisture, partially burned in ovens, crushed into a carbon-rich powder, then combined with other products. Materials used now include corn cobs, rice husks, coffee parchment, charcoal residues, palm trees and other agricultural residues.

The "Kabiof Charcoal" is much cheaper than other fuels, does not emit smoke or odors, and one piece can burn for over two hours. The product reduces the incentive to cut down trees for fuel, and as a side effect helps keep the streets clean. The fuel reduces indoor air pollution. KAGE creates waste collection jobs.

== History ==
The founder of the company, Delphin Kaze, was born in Gitega around 1997. He studied at the Faculty of Environmental Sciences in the Polytechnic University of Gitega. While researching the problems caused by deforestation, he came up with the idea of making charcoal from biodegradable waste. Initial trials were unsatisfactory, but when corn cobs were added the results were good, and the Ministry of Higher Education and Scientific Research validated the product.

Kaze launched the Kaze Freen Economy company in Gitega in 2018. UNDP Burundi provided material and technical support to help the company expand its capacity. As of 2020 the company was providing fuel to about 8,000 households. In 2020 the company employed 42 people and produced 300 to 500 kilograms (660 to 1,100 lb) a day. The Burundian state granted Delphin Kaze land to build his factory in the north of Bujumbura. In October 2020 production began in Bujumbura.

The Bujumbura factory is one a large plot. Piles of rice husks are stored on the east side, which has interconnected machines making coal and briquettes. Improved stoves, piles of coal and some of the offices are on the north of the plot. The south has a factory for manufacturing efficient stoves. The reception and other offices are on the west side.

In May 2021 First Lady Angeline Ndayishimiye visited Kaze Green Economy accompanied by the UNDP representative Nicole Kouassi, where they met Delphin Kaze. She praised his achievements, and his hiring of disabled people and women in general. Kaze told her production had increased from 350 kilograms (770 lb) per day to 28 tons per day, made up of 20 tons of firewood equivalent and 8 tons of charcoal equivalent. There were still challenges, including lack of electricity, limited storage space, waste disposal and the need to separated biodegradable household waste from other waste. In October 2021 the wives of the premiers of Burundi and Niger visited the Afritextile, Kaze Green Economy and FOMI factories in Bujumbura.

By 2022 Kage had more than 40 permanent employees and over 20 day laborers.

== See also ==
- List of companies of Burundi
- Economy of Burundi

== Sources ==
- Bigirimana, Raphaël (10 May 2021), "La 1ère Dame salue les avancées de l'entreprise KAGE", Radio Télévision Nationale du Burundi (in French)
- Itangivyiza, Yves; Niteka, Chloella; Nihimbazwe, Elaze; Pierrette, Irakoze Gloria (2021), Ideas for Action 2020 (PDF), World Bank
- "Les premières dames du Burundi et du Niger visitent les usines Afritextile, FOMI et Kaze Green Economy", ABP (in French), 25 October 2021
- Munyana, Francine (30 January 2024), Le PNUD accompagne les jeunes innovateurs qui contribuent à la réalisation des ODD (in French), UNDP
- Ndabashinze, Rénovat (25 March 2020), "Green charcoal to save forests", IWACU English News, translated by Pierre Emmanuel Ngendakumana
- Nibigira, Onesphore (6 December 2022), "Burundi : Des jeunes créent des usines de production du charbon pour préserver les forêts", Mongabay (in French)
