= Thin (film) =

- Release Poster
- Directed by: Lauren Greenfield
- Produced by: R. J. Cutler; Lauren Greenfield; Amanda Micheli; Ted Skillman
- Starring: Shelly Guillory; Brittany Robinson; Alisa Williams; Polly Williams
- Edited by: Kate Amend
- Music by: Miriam Cutler
- Distributed by: HBO
- Release date: November 14, 2006
- Language: English

Thin (often styled as THIN) is a 2006 cinéma vérité documentary film directed by Lauren Greenfield and distributed by HBO. It was filmed at The Renfrew Center of Florida in Coconut Creek, a 40-bed residential facility for the treatment of women with eating disorders. The center has been described as "one of the nation's best-known inpatient eating disorders centres". The film follows four women with anorexia nervosa, bulimia nervosa and other eating disorders in their struggle for recovery. The film premiered at the 2005 Sundance Film Festival in 2005, before premiering to the general public on November 14, 2006 on HBO.

== Production ==
Greenfield describes the making of Thin as "[...] a continuation of my decade-long exploration of body image and the way the female body has become a primary expression of identity for girls and women in our time."

Greenfield first visited The Renfrew Center in 1997 on assignment for Time magazine. She later returned to photograph young women for her personal project, the photo-book and art exhibition, Girl Culture. Following multiple trips to the facility, she gained their trust and support to begin using it to film Thin, her directorial debut which she produced in collaboration with R.J. Cutler.

Living at the center for six months, Greenfield and director of photography Amanda Micheli received unrestricted access to film staff meetings, therapy sessions, mealtimes and daily weigh-ins that depict the highly structured routine of inpatients' daily lives. The film explores their turbulent interpersonal relationships, and highlights the efforts of the Renfrew medical team and the complex tasks they face.

== Main participants ==
=== Shelly ===
Shelly Guillory is a 25-year-old psychiatric nurse who enters the Center at the beginning of the film with a PEG feeding tube surgically implanted in her stomach. She admits herself into Renfrew after ten hospitalizations. On her arrival she has been anorexic for six years and tube-fed for five of those years. She has an identical twin, Kelly, who does not have an eating disorder.

Shelly describes a reliance on various mood stabilizers and tranquilizers, and has volatile mood swings throughout the film, in particular getting very angry and aggressive when stolen food mistakenly attributed to her and pulse deficits lead to her being accused of purging.

The epilogue states that Shelly lost more weight after discharge and underwent electric shock therapy to treat her depression.

=== Polly ===
Pollack "Polly" Ann Williams has been at Renfrew for nine weeks. She admitted herself after a suicide attempt over two slices of pizza, explaining that while they weren't the whole motivation, they were "kind of the straw that broke the camel's back". When interviewed she says that "dieting has always been a huge part of my life" and that she was "counting calories and counting fat by the time [she] was 11".

She celebrates her 30th birthday in the Center and seems to be making progress with her anorexia, but has trouble with some of the rules. She is expelled after Keilee tells the staff about Polly getting the NEDA symbol tattooed on her hip while on a day pass from the Center. This incident was compounded by giving mood stabilizers to Shelly. Shelly told staff that Polly had given her Neurontin after the pills were discovered in her room during a routine check for contraband.

Upon being given her 24-hour notice to leave, Polly expresses despair and purges on camera. She was described in the epilogue as continuing to have trouble with purging and weight loss, and that she ultimately died in February 2008 at age 33.

=== Brittany ===
Brittany Robinson is a 15-year-old student who was admitted to Renfrew with liver damage, a low heart rate and hair loss after losing nearly half her body weight in less than a year. She describes herself as a compulsive over-eater from the age of 8, leading into compulsive dieting and anorexia from the age of 12, citing "a bad body image" and a craving for acceptance amongst her peers as her motivation to lose weight.

According to Brittany, her mother also has an eating disorder and in an interview, Brittany describes how they would have "the greatest time" with "chew and spit"; chewing "bags and bags of candy" and spitting it out without swallowing. Her mother's experience of anorexia is touched upon in greater detail in an interview in the film's companion book, also titled Thin.

Throughout the film Brittany is resistant to recovery, explaining that she would like to lose "another forty pounds" and that she "just want[s] to be thin". She tells her nutritionist she has purged twelve times since entering Renfrew and walks out of group therapy in tears when her dedication to recovery is challenged by Polly.

Brittany's insurance benefits run out, forcing her to leave treatment early. She relapses into anorexia before leaving, prompting concern amongst patients and staff, and is released against medical advice.

The epilogue states that she began to restrict after discharge and lost weight rapidly. Insurance would not pay for further treatment.

=== Alisa ===
Alisa Williams, a 30-year-old divorced mother of two, traces her eating issues back to an incident at the pediatrician when she was 7 and put on a diet which then led to anorexia. She describes massive binge/purge sessions which resulted in hospitalizations due to the resulting dehydration and her severe abuse of diuretics, hydrochlorothiazide, laxatives, enemas and ipecac.

Apart from her binges, which she describes as occurring "every few weeks or so, over and over again, for three or four days", she was following an extreme starvation diet prior to entering Renfrew. She had been hospitalized five times in the three months leading to her admittance to the Center. Having struggled with her eating disorder for 16 years, Alisa took disability leave from her job as a pharmaceutical rep in order to enter treatment.

Alisa seems to respond well to Renfrew and towards the end of her stay expresses a desire to "taste recovery".

After discharge, Alisa struggles through dinner with her children and Shelly at a restaurant. She picks at her food and takes tiny bites. The film later shows Alisa, agitated and pacing around her home, distracting her two children with cartoons and waffles as she enters her bathroom to purge. The epilogue reveals that she would go on to lose weight and attempt suicide, and that she returned to Renfrew for treatment and maintained a healthy weight after leaving.

== Participant status updates ==
- In 2008, Shelly reported that she was successfully recovering from her eating disorder. In 2010, she was featured in a news feature about her and her friend's recovery from anorexia, which stated that the attention Guillory received after the film debuted triggered a relapse. Guillory later went to rehab for a drug addiction, and described herself in the article as no longer having an eating disorder.
- Polly moved to Chattanooga after leaving Renfrew, went back to school to study photography, and was managing a studio at the time of the film's release. She died at her residence on February 8, 2008 due to an overdose of sleeping pills. Her death is believed to have been a suicide.
- Brittany is now fully recovered and a mother of three.
- Alisa reportedly recovered from her eating disorder and began work as a teacher.

== Awards ==
Thin was selected for competition at the 2006 Sundance Film Festival and won the John Grierson Award for best feature-length documentary at the London Film Festival 2006. It has also screened at Hot Docs and Full Frame, as well as film festivals in Chicago, Vancouver, Austin, St. Louis, Ojai, Galway and Sweden. It received the 2006 Documentary Grand Jury Prize at the Boston Independent Film Festival, Newport International Film Festival and Jackson Hole Film Festival. It has also been nominated for an International Documentary Association Award.
