= Kåge =

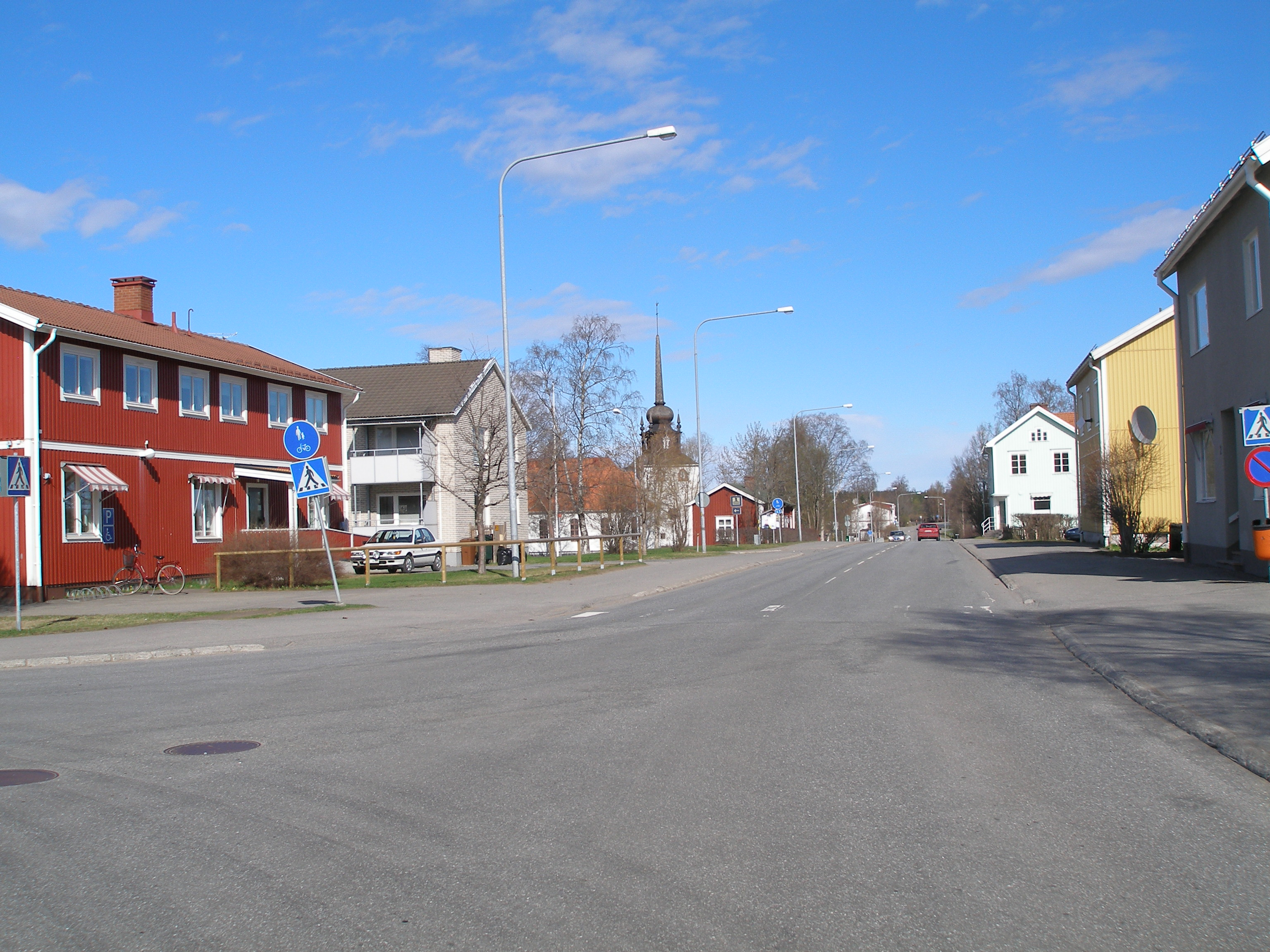

- Location within Västerbotten Location within Sweden
- Coordinates: 64°50′N 20°59′E
- Country: Sweden
- Province: Västerbotten
- County: Västerbotten County
- Municipality: Skellefteå Municipality

Area
  - Total: 2.47 km^{2} (0.95 sq mi)

Population (31 December 2010)
  - Total: 2,248
  - Density: 909/km^{2} (2,350/sq mi)
- Time zone: UTC+1 (CET)
  - Summer (DST): UTC+2 (CEST)

Kåge is a locality situated in Skellefteå Municipality, Västerbotten County, Sweden with 2,248 inhabitants in 2010.
