= Solovetsky Stone =

Monument on Lubyanka Square in Moscow, Russia

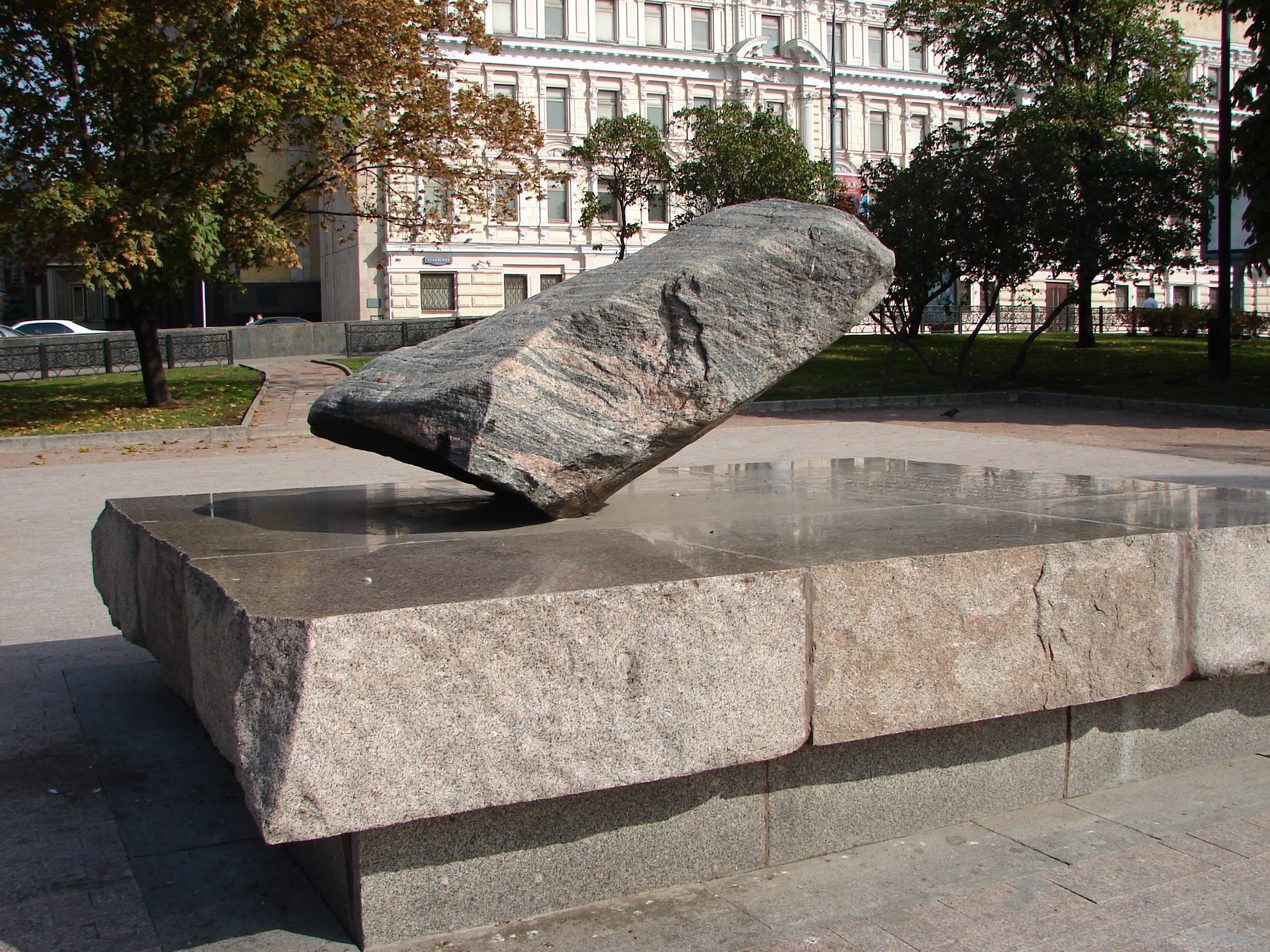
The Solovetsky Stone in Moscow (55°45′32.8″N 37°37′39.2″E)

The Solovetsky Stone (Russian: Солове́цкий ка́мень, romanized: Solovetsky kamen’) is a monument on Lubyanka Square in Moscow to the victims of political repression. It is in close proximity to the Lubyanka Building, headquarters since 1918 of various Russian security services, from the Cheka to today's FSB. The monument is made up of a large boulder brought from the Solovetsky Islands in the far northern White Sea, where the first permanent camp of the Soviet penal system, the Solovki prison camp, was set up in 1923. The boulder rests on a granite plinth inscribed "To the victims of political repression". The monument was erected in 1990 to honor victims of political repression in the Soviet Union. Since then it has been the focus of annual and occasional gatherings and ceremonies: in particular, the Day in Remembrance of the Victims of Political Repression from 1991 onwards on 30 October and, since 2007, "Restoring the Names" on the day before.

It has been the focus of tributes since 16 February 2024, when the Federal Penitentiary Service announced that activist and opposition leader Alexei Navalny had died at the prison in Yamalo-Nenets in Western Siberia.

== Arkhangelsk to Moscow ==
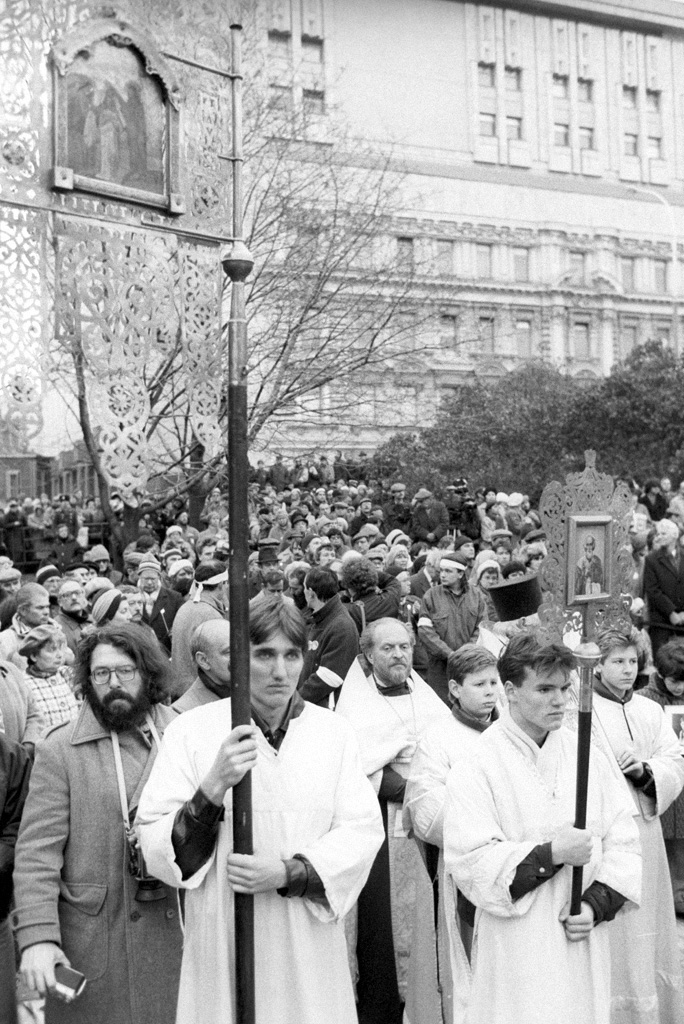
Gleb Yakunin performing a service for the victims of the Stalinist political repressions during the unveiling of the Solovetsky Stone in Lubyanka Square, Moscow, on October 30, 1990

The first "Solovki Stone" memorial was erected in northwest Russia's Arkhangelsk Region by the local Sovest (Conscience) society. This monument was created at a time when the debate about the future form of any memorial to the victims of Stalinism had still not been resolved. Subsequently many monuments erected across Russia to the victims of the Soviet regime emulated the same stark and abstract simplicity, also using large unshaped or rough-hewn boulders, for example the memorial in Nizhny Novgorod's Bugrovskoe cemetery.

According to the Russian NGO Memorial, the monument was erected on 30 October 1990 to commemorate a 1974 initiative by political prisoners to establish a "Day of Political Prisoners in the USSR." In 1991, the Supreme Soviet of Russia officially established 30 October as Remembrance Day for the Victims of Political Repression. It was on 30 October 2007 that Vladimir Putin visited the Butovo firing range near Moscow and ten years later on the same date he and Patriarch Kirill of the Russian Orthodox Church inaugurated the Wall of Sorrow in the city itself.

== St Petersburg, 2002 ==
A third Solovki Stone was finally erected in 2002 in Saint Petersburg, in the public garden on Troitskaya Square.

Designed by Yevgeny Ukhnalyov, it is officially known as the Memorial to the Victims of Political Repression in Petrograd-Leningrad. The monument is a 10-tonne granite boulder taken 50 meters (160 ft) from the site of a mass execution at the Solovki prison camp in December 1923. The rock is set on a polished granite base bearing four inscriptions: "To the inmates of the Gulag", "To the victims of Communist Terror", "To those who Fought for Freedom" and a famous line from Anna Akhmatova's long poem Requiem (1935-1961): "I would like to recall them all by name,/ but ..." (the lists have been taken—there's no one to ask). [Хотелось бы всех поименно назвать...]

The monument was unveiled on 4 September 2002 in the run-up to the tercentenary celebrations of the founding of Saint Petersburg. According to the Solovki Encyclopedia, the architect Ukhnalyov and State Duma deputy Yuly Rybakov themselves covered the costs of the memorial's creation, including transportation of the 10,400 kg (22,900 lb) boulder from the Solovetsky Islands in the White Sea. One of the former Soviet Union's major monuments to the victims of political terror, the Levashovo Memorial Cemetery, was already in existence in St Petersburg but the city administration made no contribution, although it had a significant budget allocation from federal and regional funds to celebrate three hundred years of the city on the Neva's existence.

== See also ==
- List of individual rocks
- Solovetsky Stone (Saint Petersburg)
- Day of Remembrance, 30 October
