= Wall of Grief =

Monument in Moscow

- Стена скорби
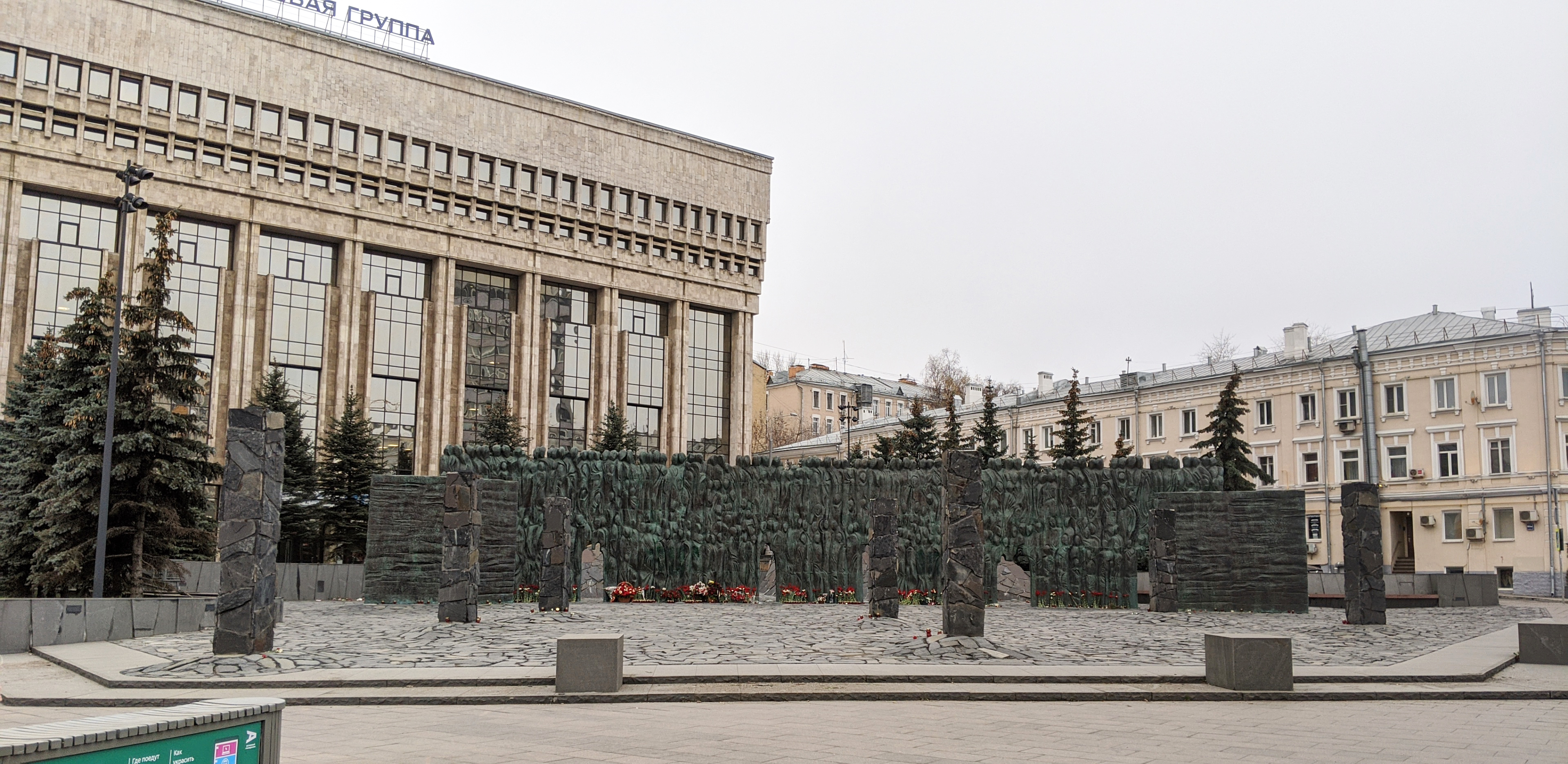
- Interactive map of Wall of Grief
- Location: Garden Ring Road, Moscow, Russia
- Coordinates: 55°46′12.3″N 37°38′32.2″E
- Designer: Georgy Frangulyan
- Material: Bronze
- Opening date: October 30, 2017
- Dedicated to: Victims of political repressions
- Website: memoryfund.ru/проекты

The Wall of Grief (Russian: Стена́ ско́рби, romanized: Stena skorbi; sometimes translated as Wall of Sorrow) is a monument in Moscow to the victims of political persecution by Joseph Stalin during the country's Soviet era. The national memorial was unveiled by Russian president Vladimir Putin and Patriarch Kirill of Moscow on October 30, 2017, the annual Day of Remembrance of the Victims of Political Repressions.

== Background ==
From the 1920s to 1950s, under Stalin's rule in the Soviet Union, an estimated 750,000 people were executed, in addition to the millions of victims who died as a result of famine, labor camp conditions and other atrocities committed by the government. Russian president Vladimir Putin ordered the construction of the monument in 2014. The city of Moscow paid approximately $6 million of the cost, and roughly $800,000 more was contributed by individual and corporate donors.

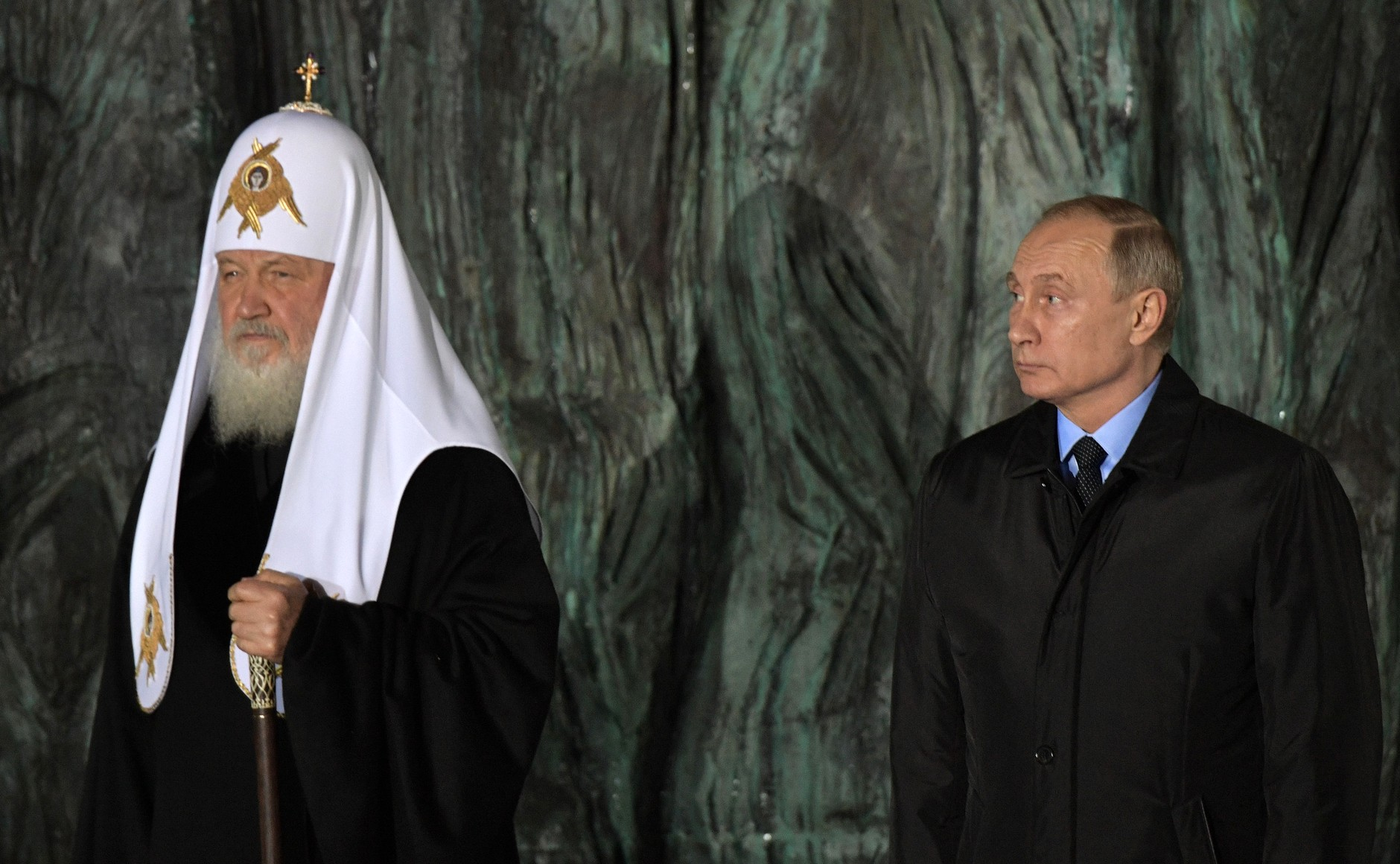
The Patriarch Kirill of Moscow and President Putin during the opening ceremony

After meeting with the country's Human Rights and Civil Society Council, Putin stated on October 30, 2017, during the opening ceremony that the tragedy must not be forgotten or justified, as "an unequivocal and clear assessment of the repression will help to prevent it being repeated". The ceremony was witnessed by around 100 attendees, many of whom were senior citizens, human rights activists and government officials of Moscow.

The monument is not the first of its kind, but it is the first built by presidential decree. Another monument, the Solovetsky Stone, was erected in 1990 and is located across from KGB headquarters in Lubyanka Square, Moscow.

== Structure and design ==
The Wall of Grief was built on an old parking lot at the busy intersection of Garden Ring Road and Academician Sakharov Avenue in central Moscow. Georgy Frangulyan, the designer of the monument who spent two years working on its creation, noted that the Wall of Grief is "an expression of feelings, of fear and alarm", rather than a "representative" work of art. He explained that the location of the sculpture is meant to emphasize that "repression could happen anyplace".

The monument is made of bronze and its shape reflects the arc of a scythe. A dark, curved wall that is approximately 100 feet (30 m) long and 20 feet (6.1 m) high serves as the primary part of the monument, on which there are numerous faceless human figures. According to Frangulyan, the wall's scythe form represents the Grim Reaper, while the indistinguishable human faces highlight "the victims' anonymity".

== Reception ==
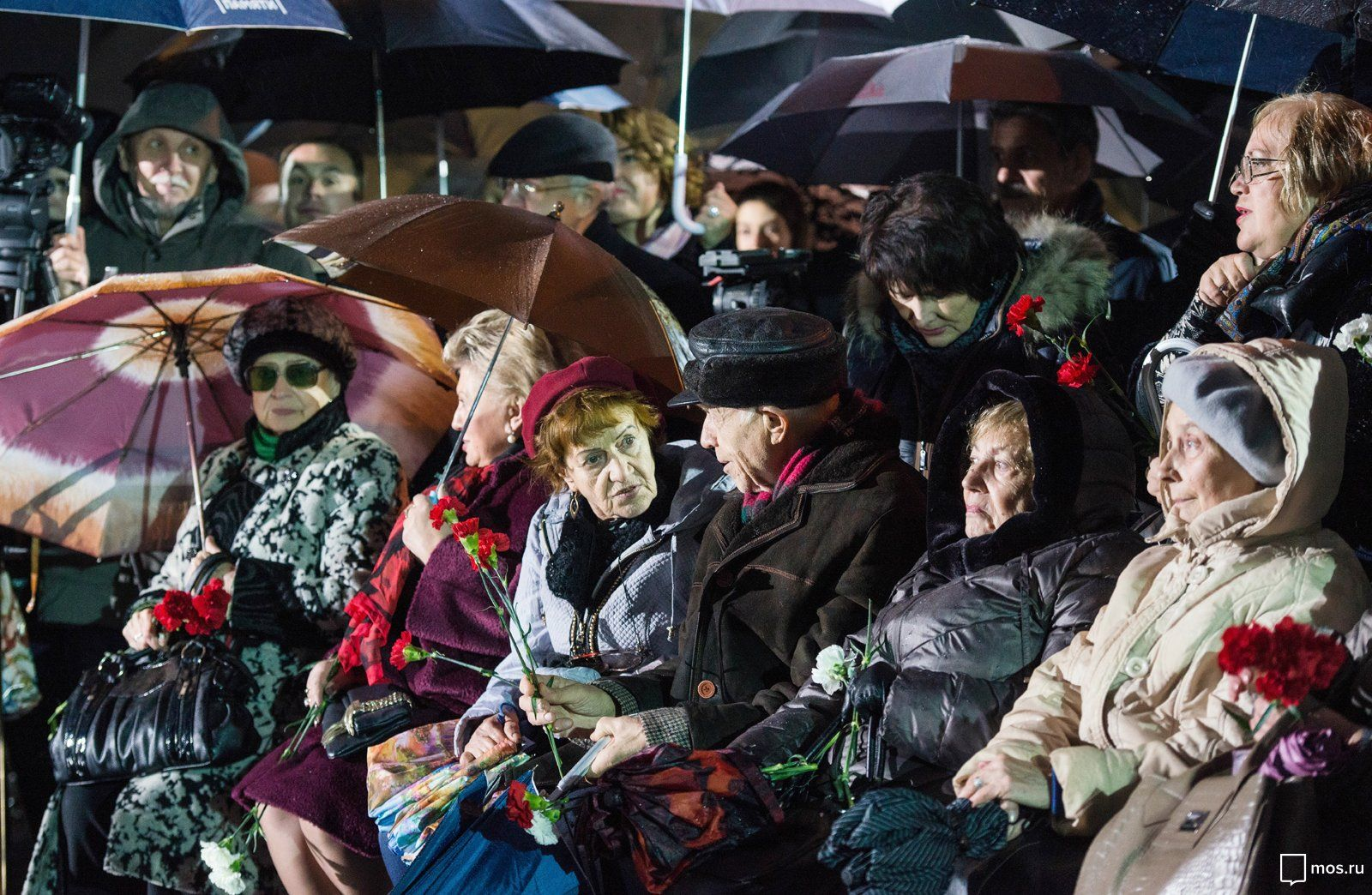
Wall of Grief opening ceremony

The unveiling of the monument was immediately followed by controversy, as some dissidents argued that the Wall of Grief is a symbol of "hypocrisy", and that the Russian government's recent activities are no different from the political repressions they claim to oppose. Some 40 critics and dissidents, including Alexander Podrabinek, Pavel Litvinov, Vladimir Bukovsky and Mustafa Dzhemilev, published a petition accusing the government of "trying to whitewash the present". They remarked in the petition that the Kremlin sponsored the monument in order to "pretend that political repression is a thing long since past", whereas political prisoners in contemporary Russia are urgently in need of "help and attention".

Meanwhile, some people considered the monument "an important step" for the country. Elena B. Zhemkova, chief operating officer of Memorial, an organization which archives records of repressed people, said that having the monument introduced by the state leadership symbolizes the country's recognition of terror and murder. The director of the Gulag History Museum in Moscow, Roman Romanov, said the support to the monument from both the president and ordinary citizens indicates "a new point of reckoning".

In February 2024, Moscow police arrested people laying flowers at the monument after the death of opposition politician and political prisoner Alexei Navalny.

== See also ==
- Great Purge
- Last Address
- Solovetsky Stone
- Political repression in the Soviet Union
