= Day of Remembrance of the Victims of Political Repressions =

Day of mourning in Russia

Remembrance Day for the Victims of Political Repression
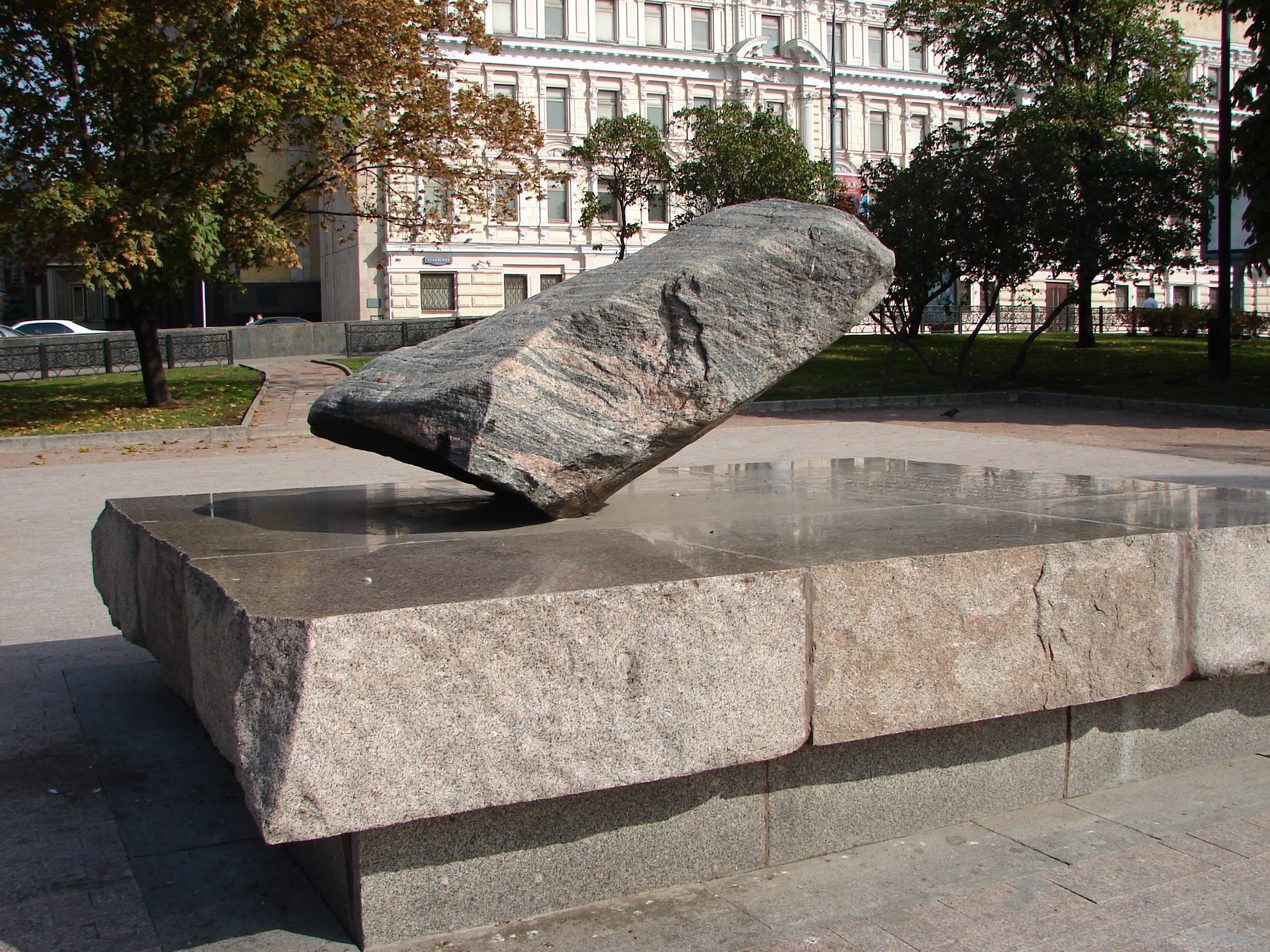
- The Solovki Stone. Since 1991 a monument in central Moscow (Lubyanka Square) to the victims of political repression in the USSR. Also the location since 2007 of "Restoring the Names" on 29 October each year.
- Date: 30 October

The Remembrance Day for the Victims of Political Repression (Russian: День памяти жертв политических репрессий) is an annual day when victims of political repression in the Soviet Union are remembered and mourned across the Russian Federation.

== Origins ==
The day has been observed since 30 October 1991. It was established by the Supreme Soviet of Russia on 18 October 1991, the same day as that body passed the "Law on the Rehabilitation of the Victims of Political Repression", a key piece of legislation still in force. (The Memorial (society) has estimated that 12 million people qualified for rehabilitation under the terms of that act.)

30 October is an official date in the calendar of the Russian Federation. In 2007 President Putin visited the Butovo firing range on 30 October. Ten years later it was the day on which President Putin and Patriarch Kirill inaugurated the new Wall of Sorrow.

This new use continues to be criticised by some Russian rights activists. They remind people that the date was originally chosen in the 1970s by protesting political prisoners in the USSR. As numbers of prisoners of conscience and political prisoners grow in today's Russia, they comment, this distinction is being obscured, undermined and forgotten by the new tradition.

== Other dates ==
Certain other dates are marked each year in Russia by particular groups; sometimes in addition to 30 October, sometimes instead of that official date.

In a number of places the Russian Orthodox Church celebrates the Feast of Russia's New Martyrs and Confessors on the nearest Sunday to 25 January.

The country's remaining Germans (28 August) and Poles living in Russia or visiting the country (2-3 September) each have their own days of "Remembrance and Sorrow". So do nations deported during the Second World War.

In certain regions the victims of political repression are remembered on a different or additional date, e.g. the International Day of Remembrance at Sandarmokh on 5 August each year. There is also sometimes a separate regional date for their remembrance, as on 9-13 September in the Chelyabinsk Region.

== Definition and terminology ==
The original Russian term for repression is plural, literally "Political Repressions" but more appropriately translated "repressive measures". The term refers to a variety of crimes committed against the population by the Soviet regime at different times since 1917. Summary executions, imprisonment, and deportation are frequently encountered between 1918 and 1954: see political repression in the Soviet Union.

Activists and researchers at Memorial now prefer the more specific term "political terror". This includes not just the unprecedented mass murder perpetrated in 1937-1938 or the forced collectivisation of agriculture, the mass resettlement of "kulak" families, and the later deportation of entire ethnic groups and nations (Soviet Germans, Kalmyks, and Crimean Tatars) under Stalin. It also embraces the wholesale shooting of hostages and indiscriminate massacres under Lenin that characterised the formative Civil War years.

Two major projects of the Memorial (society) incorporate the term in their titles. The massive online database assembled since 1998 by Memorial (society) is entitled "Victims of Political Terror in the USSR". The 2016 survey of commemorative sites and burial grounds conducted by St Petersburg Memorial is called "Russia's Necropolis of Terror and the Gulag".

== Commemorative sites and organisers ==
In 2014 the Research & Information Centre of St Petersburg Memorial found that 30 October was observed as an annual event at 103 of the commemorative sites it surveyed in Russia; it was much the most common date in the calendar. The sites were mostly but not exclusively associated with the Great Terror of 1937-1938 and the mass graves in which victims bodies were then concealed.

Most often the ceremonies were organised by the local city, town or village council and attended by relatives and descendants of the victims, local officials, clergy and schoolchildren. In a smaller number of cases the event was organised by local NGOs and other public institutions, e.g. the various Associations for Victims of Political Repression, the Memorial Society, and museums and schools in places like Inta, Pechora and Norilsk.

The Memorial Society across Russia has generally played a much greater part in the early stages of commemoration. As the "Russia's Necropolis" survey released in 2016 demonstrates, exploratory groups from Memorial were often the first to identify unmarked burial grounds. The society's members then campaigned for monuments, memorials and plaques to confirm their status. Members of the local Memorial Society are frequently mentioned among the regular participants at yearly ceremonies, on 30 October and other dates.

== Russian Federation ==
This is a list of 22 places from across Russia's 83 subjects of federation where the "Remembrance Day for the Victims of Political Repression" is regularly observed. They range in size from cities of several million inhabitants to small towns and settlements like Inta and one site (Verkhny Armurdan) that is no longer inhabited.

30 October is also commemorated at a few places in neighbouring countries (e.g. the Akmol former camp for "Wives of Traitors of the Motherland" in Kazakhstan).

In one of Russia's eight Federal Districts, the North Caucasus, 30 October is sometimes observed, but generally cedes in importance to other dates.

On 30 October 2021 gatherings were held, despite ongoing Covid restrictions, at many places in the Russian Federation. The ceremonies took place, for instance, at memorial cemeteries located at the killing fields of the late 1930s, such as Krasny Bor near Petrozavodsk and the Butovo in southern Moscow and at certain burial grounds of the Gulag, e.g. Yagrinlag graves near Severodvinsk.

=== Central Russia ===
- Lubyanka Square by the Solovki Stone in front of the Polytechnial Museum (Moscow). Organiser(s): Memorial (society) for both the official date and the preceding "Restoring the Names" on 29 October.
- Kommunarka firing range (Moscow). Organiser(s): Moscow City Commission for Restoring the Rights of the Rehabilitated Victims of Political Repression, Moscow Memorial (society) and the Gulag History Museum.
- Voronezh, Dubovka cemetery (Voronezh Region). Organiser(s): Voronezh city commission for Restoring the Rights of Rehabilitated Victims of Political Repression.
- Katyn memorial (Smolensk Region). Organiser(s): staff of the Katyn Memorial Complex.

=== Northwest Russia ===
- Levashovo Memorial Cemetery (Saint Petersburg). Organiser(s): St Petersburg Memorial Society and other NGOs.
- Zaretskoe Graveyard, Petrozavodsk (Karelia). In October 2017 there was an attempt to stifle proceedings or take over the ceremonies at both the Zaretskoe Graveyard and Krasny Bor.
- Krasny Bor Forest (Karelia). Organiser(s): Derevyanoe village administration.
- Syktyvkar, Nizhny Chov district (Komi Republic). Organiser(s): not known.
- Minlag eastern burial ground, Inta (Komi Republic). Organiser(s): Inta town administration and Inta Museum.

=== Volga Federal District ===
- Memorial to the Victims of Political Repression, Perm, (Perm Region). Organiser(s): Perm city administration and Perm Memorial Society.
- Gagarin Park, Samara, (Samara Region). Organiser(s): Samara Region Commission for Restoring the Rights of the Rehabilitated Victims of Political Repression.
- Zauralskaya roshcha, Orenburg (Orenburg Region). Organiser(s): Orenburg Region administration.

=== South Russia ===
- Kelermesskaya cantonment, (Adygea). Organiser(s): Ataman of Kelermess village
- Pozdneyevka cantonment, (Rostov Region). Organiser(s): Priests of the church of the Archangel Michael

=== North Caucasus ===
Like the Crimean Tatars and Kalmyks, several nations of the North Caucasus, for example, the Balkars suffered mass deportation during the war, an experience yet more traumatic than the forced collectivisation of agriculture, "dekulakisation" and the Great Terror which they had suffered with the rest of the Soviet Union.

The Chechen and Ingush were also deported in 1944, during the "Great Patriotic War". Following the April 1991 Decree Rehabilitating "Repressed Nations", the 12-year exile of the Chechen nation in Central Asia was marked annually until 2016. Chechen President Ramzan Kadyrov then prohibited such ceremonies. While the Ingush have a striking memorial in Nazran, "The Nine Towers", to commemorate this national catastrophe the extensively rebuilt Chechen capital Grozny does not. The memorial created under Dudayev commemorating the Deportation of the Chechens was destroyed on Kadyrov's orders in 2014.

=== Urals ===
- Yekaterinburg Memorial to the Victims of Political Repression, (Sverdlovsk Region). Organiser(s): Yekaterinburg City administration together with the Association of Victims of Political Repression.
- Andra, Russia former special settlement for peasant deportees, (Khanty-Mansiisk autonomous region). Organiser(s): Andra administration.
- Surgut memorial plaque commemorating forced settlers, (Khanty-Mansiisk autonomous region). Organiser(s): Surgut city administration.

=== Siberia ===
- Tyumen burials in Zatyumenskoe cemetery, (Tyumen Region). Organiser(s): Tyumen Region administration.
- Norilsk Golgotha, (Krasnoyarsk Region). Organiser(s): History of Norilsk Museum and educational institutions of Greater Norilsk.
- Pivovarikha cemetery, near Irkutsk, (Irkutsk Region). Organiser(s): Irkutsk Region administration.

=== Russian Far East ===
- Khabarovsk memorial chapel (Khabarovsk Region). Organiser(s): Khabarovsk Memorial Society.
- Magadan, "The Mask of Grief" by sculptor Ernst Neizvestny (Magadan Region). Compare Yekaterinburg.
- Verkhny Armudan village [non-existent] (Sakhalin Region). Organiser(s): Tymovsky district administration.

== Political Prisoners Day, 1974–1990 ==
The commemoration is held on the same date as the Day of the Political Prisoner in the USSR, a mid-1970s initiative led by imprisoned Soviet dissidents Kronid Lyubarsky and Alexander Murzhenko. Their protest called among other things for recognition of their status as political prisoners. In the late 1980s, during Gorbachev's "perestroika" period, protests associated with the 30 October commemoration became increasingly dramatic. This culminated on 30 October 1989 with dozens of demonstrations across the Soviet Union from the Baltic (Kaliningrad) to the Soviet Far East (Khabarovsk) and the "Living Circle" protest in Moscow when three thousand demonstrators encircled the KGB headquarters on Lubyanka Square. Political Prisoner's Day was last marked in 1990.

After its introduction in 1991, the official "Remembrance Day for the Victims of Political Repression" was adopted all over Russia to commemorate and remember the millions "repressed" (arrested, exiled, sent to the camps or shot) by the Bolshevik regime, especially under Stalin. These were years when most regions in Russia compiled and published Books of Remembrance, commemorating such victims. After 2004, however, as political prisoners and prisoners of conscience reappeared in Putin's Russia, there were repeated objections to the appropriation by the State of an unofficial day of protest, started in Soviet camps for "political" offenders. In October 2017, 37 former dissidents and rights activists from across the old Soviet Union signed a letter denouncing the hypocrisy of the new Wall of Sorrow.

An attempt to separate the victims of Stalin and Lenin from contemporary political prisoners was made in Moscow and some other places with the emergence of the unofficial "Restoring the Names" ceremony on the day before. This did not satisfy all critics. Traditionally, the Memorial Human Rights Centre releases its latest list of prisoners of conscience and political prisoners on or around 30 October each year. On 9 November 2021 it announced that there were now 337 prisoners of conscience and political prisoners in the Russian Federation.

== "Restoring the Names", 2007 onwards ==
Since 2007 Memorial has organised a day-long ceremony "Restoring the Names" every 29 October on the eve of the official Day of Remembrance in Moscow. In 2017, the contrast between the official and unofficial days of commemoration in the Russian capital, and the style in which they were held was particularly striking.

On Sunday 29 October 2017, 5,286 people attended the Restoring the Names ceremony at the Solovki Stone a short distance from FSB (NKVD) headquarters on Lubyanka Square. Over one thousand reached the microphone to read aloud the names of those killed by the regime in Moscow and the Moscow Region during Stalin's era.

The next day, Monday 30 October 2017, the Wall of Grief (designer Georgy Frangulyan), a massive new monument to the Victims of Political Repression, was opened on Sakharov Avenue by President Vladimir Putin and Patriarch Kirill of the Russian Orthodox Church. The low-key ceremony was attended by one hundred people. Among them were: elderly relatives of those repressed in the Stalin period; members of the committee that judged several hundred entries in a competition to design the new memorial (Ludmila Alexeyeva, Natalya Solzhenitsyn, Roman Romanov); and human rights officials from the presidential administration (Mikhail Fedotov, Tatiana Moskalkova and Vladimir Lukin).

The following year there was an attempt by the Moscow city authorities to shift the ceremony from the Solovki Stone to the new Wall of Sorrow on the city's outer Garden Ring. This proposal, made ostensibly on the grounds of renovation work on Lubyanka Square, proved unsuccessful and the "Restoring the Names" ceremony went ahead as usual on 29 October 2018. Since Covid restrictions came into force ceremonies on 29 and 30 October in Moscow have been held online.

== Gallery ==
Memorials in Russia dedicated to the victims of the Communist regime (1917–1991)

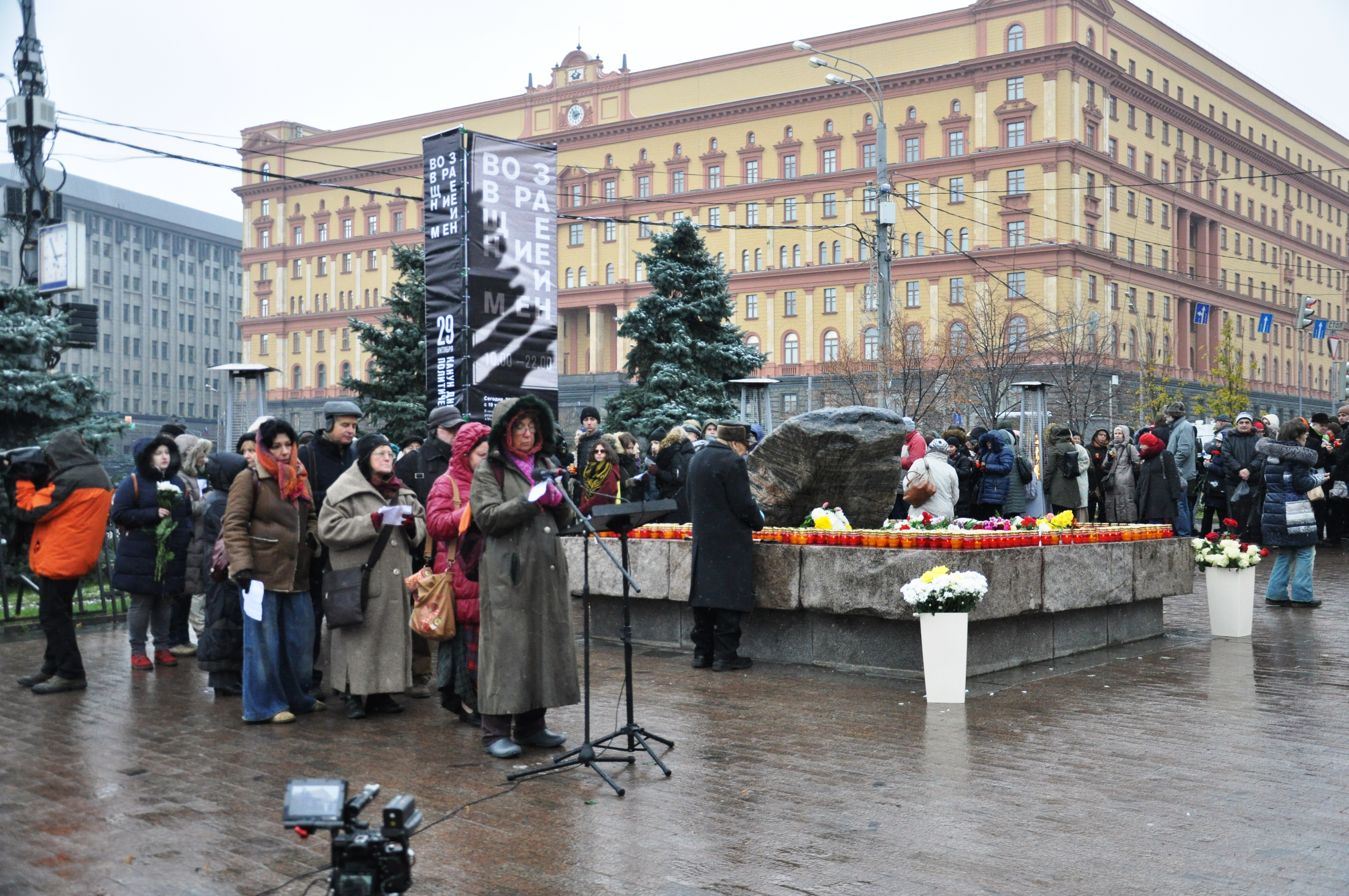
"Restoring the Names" (29 October 2016). FSB headquarters are in the background.

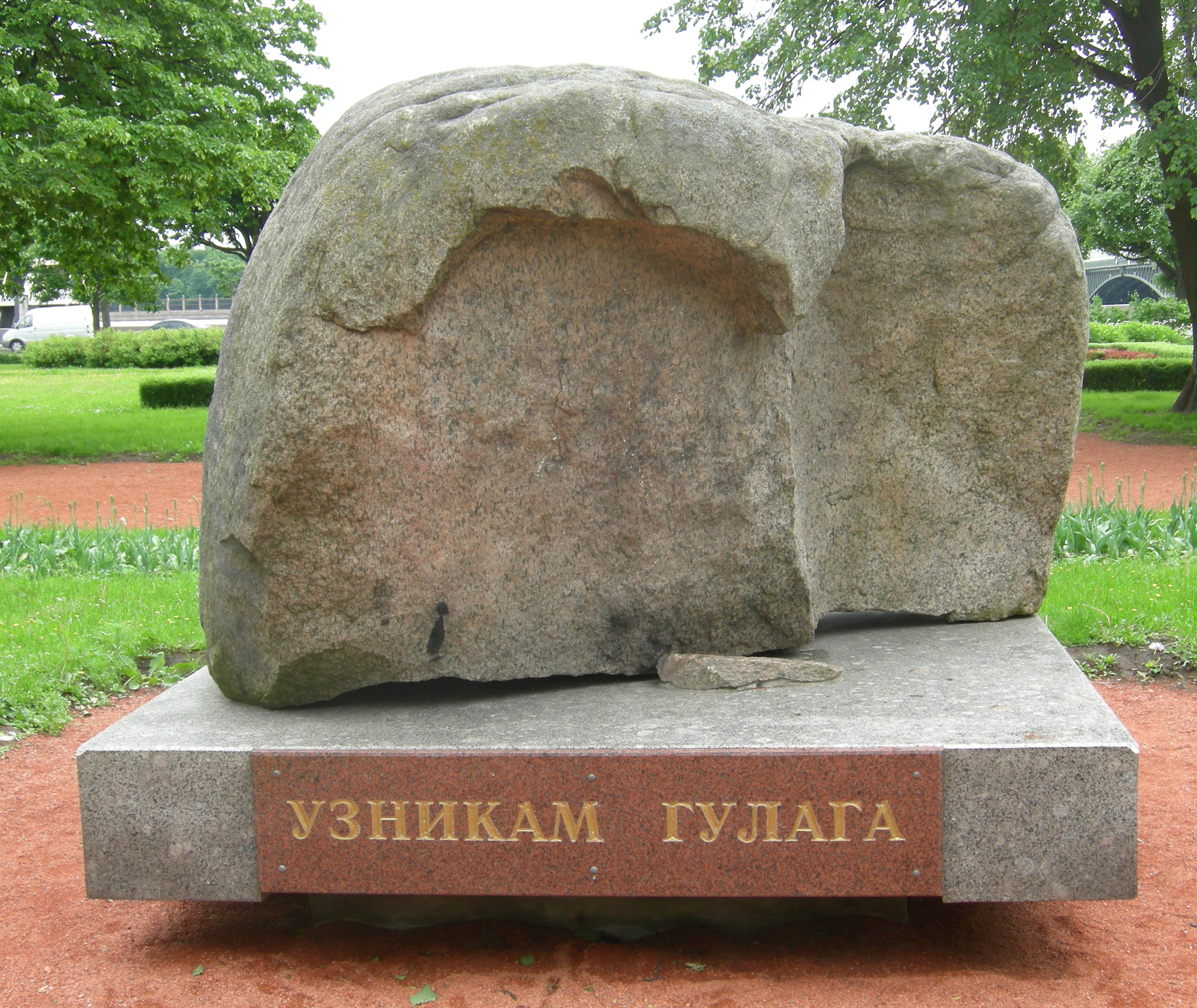
Solovki Stone in St. Petersburg. One of its inscriptions: "To inmates of the Gulag"

Memorial "To the Victims of Political Repression", Sviyazhsk, (Tatarstan).

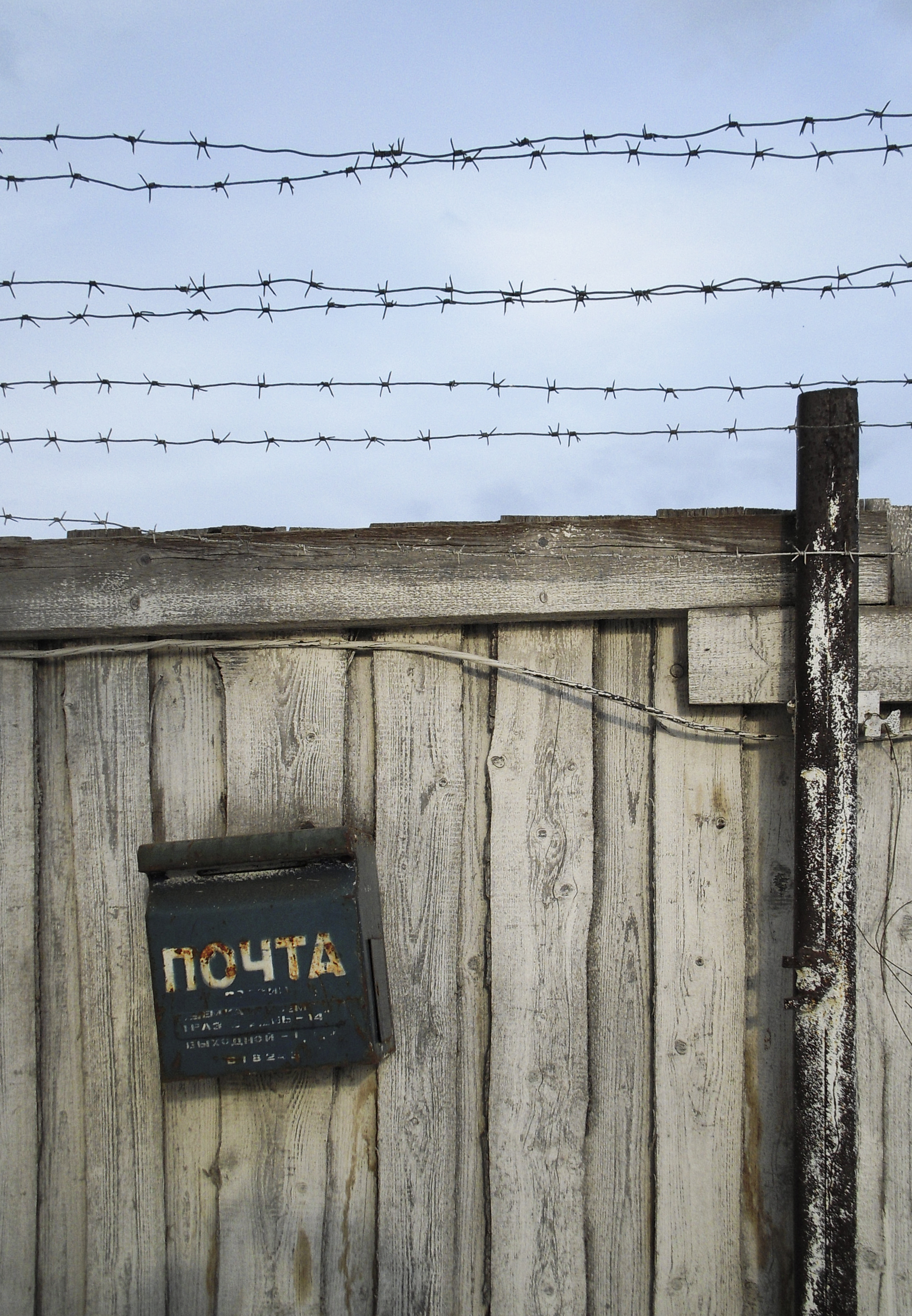
Perm-36 museum, which closed in 2014.

== See also ==
- Commemoration Day for the Victims of Communist Genocide
- Kommunarka shooting ground
- Mass graves in the Soviet Union
- Solovetsky Stone
