= Old Trinity Cathedral =

Church in St. Petersburg, Russia

Coordinates: 59.9517°N 30.3257°E

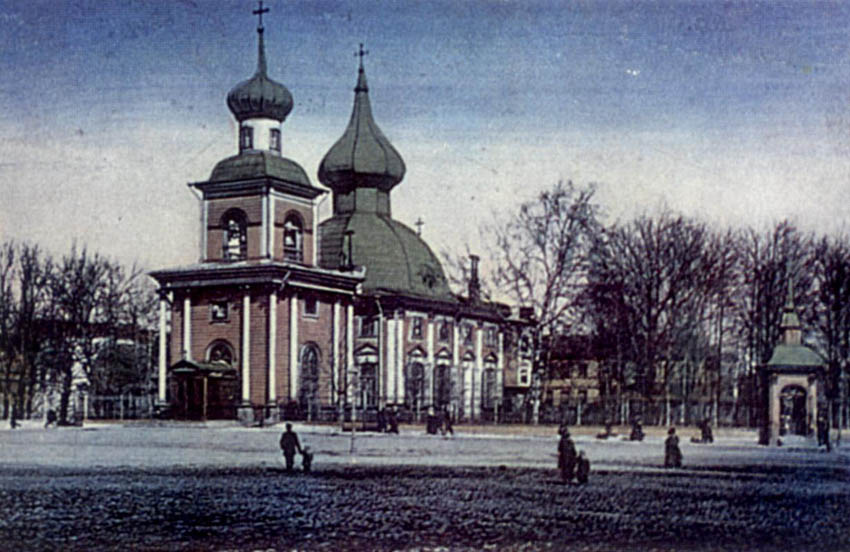
The Cathedral as it was before 1913

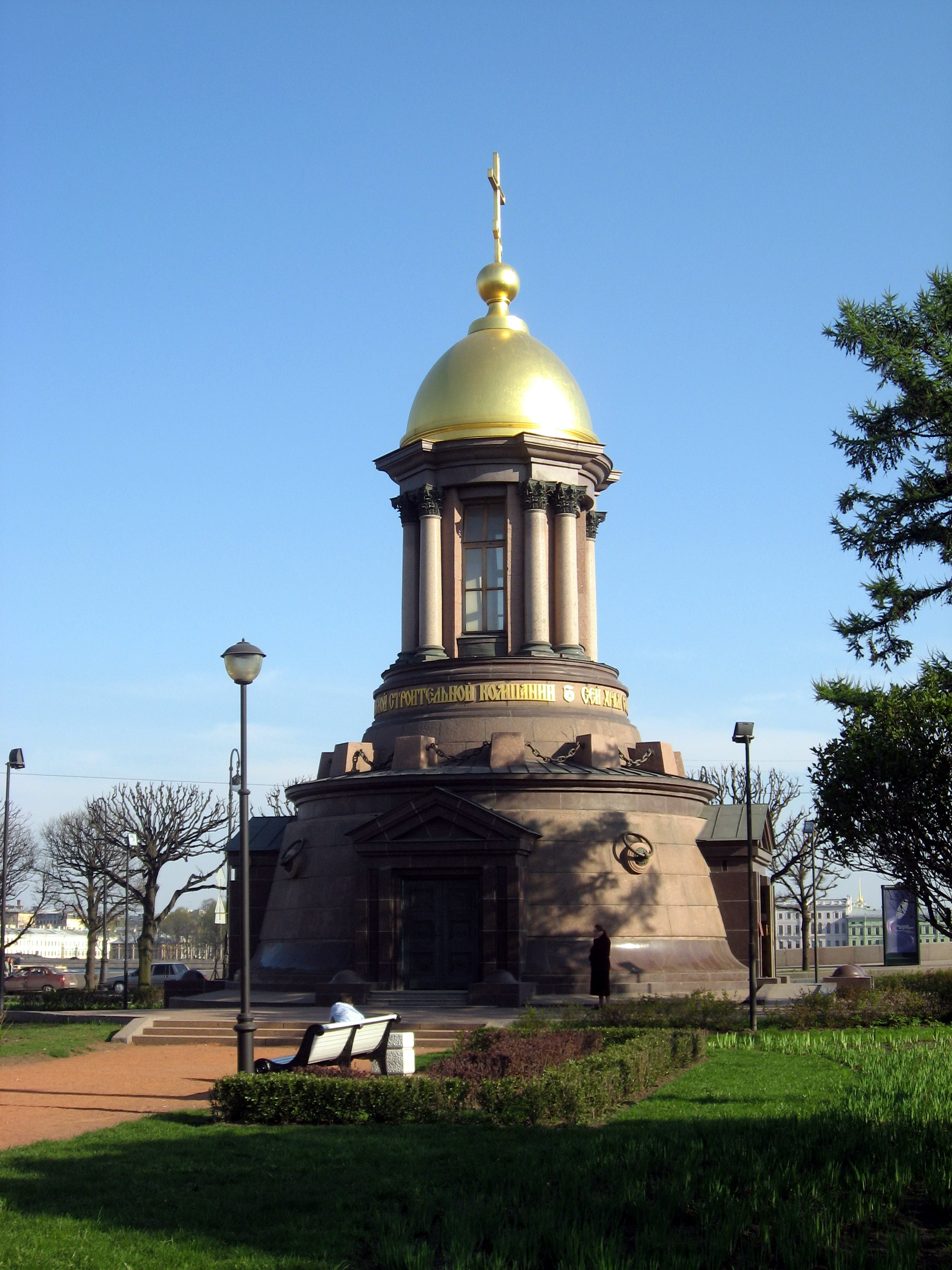
A modern chapel commemorating the site of the Old Trinity Cathedral

The Old Trinity Cathedral (also known as Peter's Trinity Cathedral, Троице-Петровский собор) was the oldest church in St. Petersburg, Russia. It was there that Peter the Great celebrated the end of the Great Northern War in 1721 and was proclaimed the first Emperor of All Russia. It was one of the city's most cherished monuments until the Soviets ordered its destruction in 1933. The site on the Neva River bank is commemorated by a chapel.

The diminutive church was built in 1743–46 as a copy of the simple wooden building commissioned by Peter the Great in 1709, with a bell/clocktower dating from 1713. Despite its small size, the Russian Orthodox Church considered it the main cathedral in the city, second only to St. Isaac's. In 1913, after a fire gutted the dilapidated structure, plans for a larger church building on the site were blocked by a group of history enthusiasts.

== See also ==
- Trinity Bridge adjoins Trinity Square and takes its name from the church.
- Trinity Cathedral, St. Petersburg
