= Yuly Rybakov =

Russian human rights activist (born 1946)

- Юлий Рыбаков
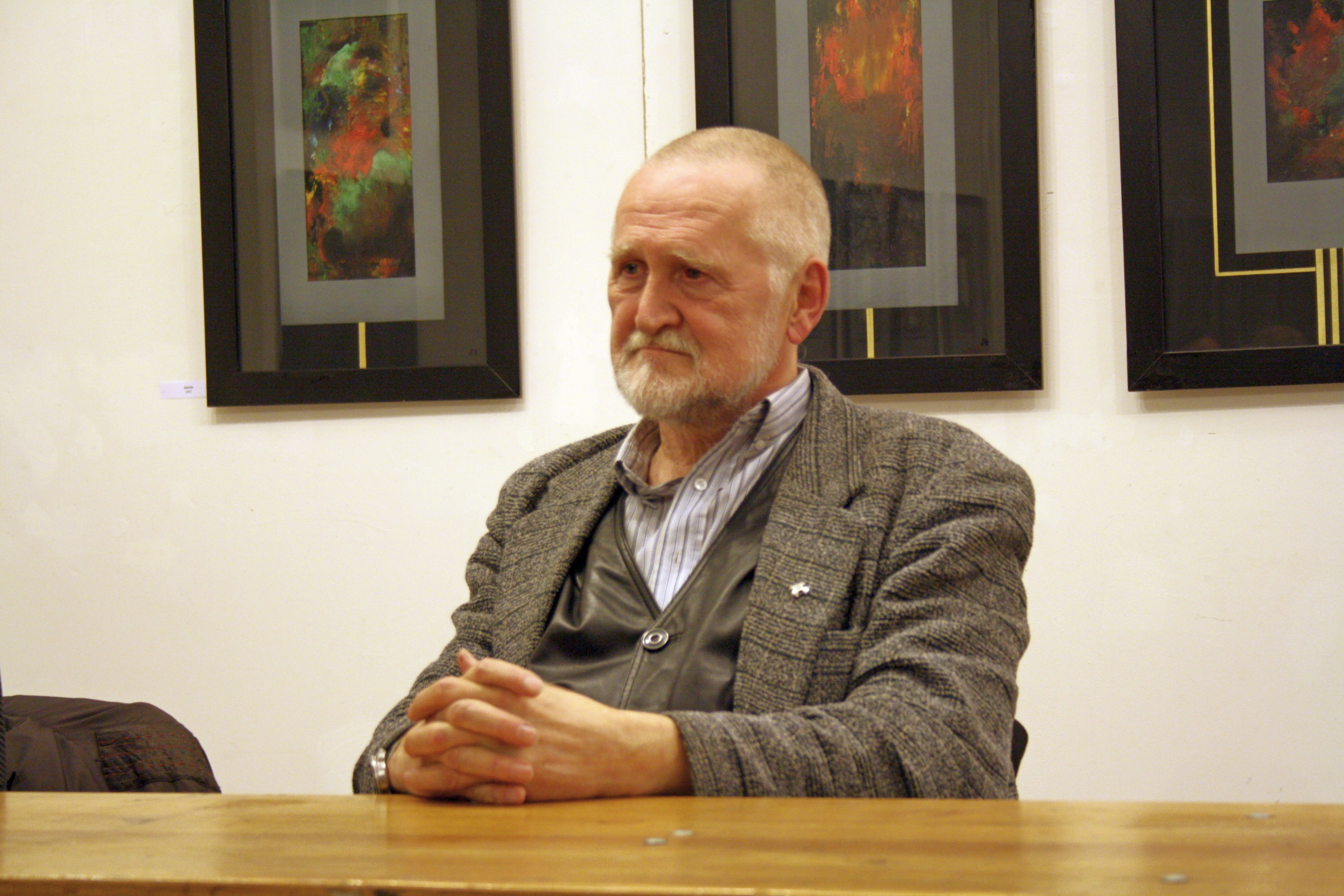

Member of the State Duma
- In office 1993–2003

Personal details
- Born: 25 February 1946 (age 80) Mariinsk, Kemerovo Oblast, Soviet Union
- Party: Democratic Union; Democratic Choice; Union of Right Forces
- Occupation: Human rights activist, public and political figure

Yuly Andreyevich Rybakov (Russian: Юлий Андреевич Рыбаков; born 25 February 1946) is a Russian human rights activist, a former member of the State Duma (1993–2003), a former Chairman of the Subcommittee on Human Rights (2000–2003), the founder of the magazine "Terra incognita", and a former political prisoner.

== Biography ==
Rybakov was born in 1946 in Mariinsk, Kemerovo Oblast in Siberia, at a camp for political prisoners, to a family of naval officers from Saint Petersburg. His parents were illegally purged. In 1974, Rybakov finished art school, college, and later studied at the Ilya Repin Leningrad Institute for Painting.

He was arrested by the KGB in 1976 for taking part in the dissident movement for human rights, as well as the distribution of Aleksandr Solzhenitsyn's books, leaflets and creating slogans (such as the inscription on the wall of the bastion of the Czar's Peter and Paul Fortress: "you may crucify freedom, but the human soul knows no shackles"). He was arrested under the 70th ("anti-Soviet") article of the Criminal Code. Rybakov was convicted for a particularly daring act of "hooliganism" and embezzlement to six years imprisonment at a stronger prison regime. In 1982, he returned to Leningrad and studied law. In 1988, he became one of the organizers and leaders of the Leningrad branch of the Democratic Union Party, which stated publicly its goal to eliminate the Communist Party's monopoly on power and establish democracy in Russia.

In 1990, he was elected to the Leningrad City Council, and organized the first state commission on human rights. In 1993, Rybakov was elected to the State Duma. After the death of Galina Starovoytova, he headed the Democratic Russia Party. He resigned as chairman in October 2000. In the same year, he was elected to the State Duma of III convocation. In March 2010, he signed an address of the Russian opposition, entitled Putin Must Go.

== Events in Budennovsk ==
In 1995, in the midst of Budyonnovsk hospital hostage crisis, Rybakov, together with the State Duma Sergei Kovalev and Viktor Kurochkin, on behalf of Prime Minister Viktor Chernomyrdin negotiated with Shamil Basayev, who seized the hospital. The talks failed to agree on the release of most hostages – to ensure the safety of terrorists along with them on the buses back to Chechnya, only 140 volunteers were to go, including negotiators. In the village of Zandag, Rybakov was released along with the other hostages.

== Advocacy of Human Rights ==
In 1990, Rybakov created the first Soviet Human Rights Commission. Member of the International Society for Human Rights, the editorial board of the journals "The Edge" and "Seeding" partnership "Free Culture".

During the war in Chechnya from 1996–1999, Rybakov participated in the liberation of 2,500 servicemen who were in Chechen captivity.

From 2000 to 2003, he was chairman of the Subcommittee on Human Rights of the State Duma.

Since 2006, he was member of the Yabloko Party, co-chair the human rights group in the party Yabloko.

Since 2007, he has not been in a political party.

In June 2007, the "Human Rights Council of St. Petersburg" was formed, which included several human rights organizations and defenders such as Rybakov, Yuriy Nesterov, Natalia Evdokimova and Leonid Romankov.

== Sources ==
- Heller, H. (16 August 2016). ""Вы распинаете свободу, но душа человека не знает оков!": Первая акция политического искусства в СССР" ['You crucify freedom, but the soul knows no chains': the First Political Art Performance in Russia]. Colta.ru (in Russian).
- Likhanova, T. (2001). ""Судьба без права переписки". Из недалекого прошлого" ['The Fate Without the Right to Correspondence '. From the Recent Past]. Terra incognita (in Russian).
- Voltskaya, T. (26 May 2016). "Зэки в пятнадцатом поколении" [15th Generation of Prisoners]. Radio Liberty (in Russian).
