= Memorial to the Victims of Political Repression (Saint Petersburg) =

Monument in Saint Petersburg, Russia

Coordinates: 59°57′00″N 30°21′49″E

- Памятник жертвам политических репрессий, «Метафизические сфинксы» ("Metaphysical Sphinxes")
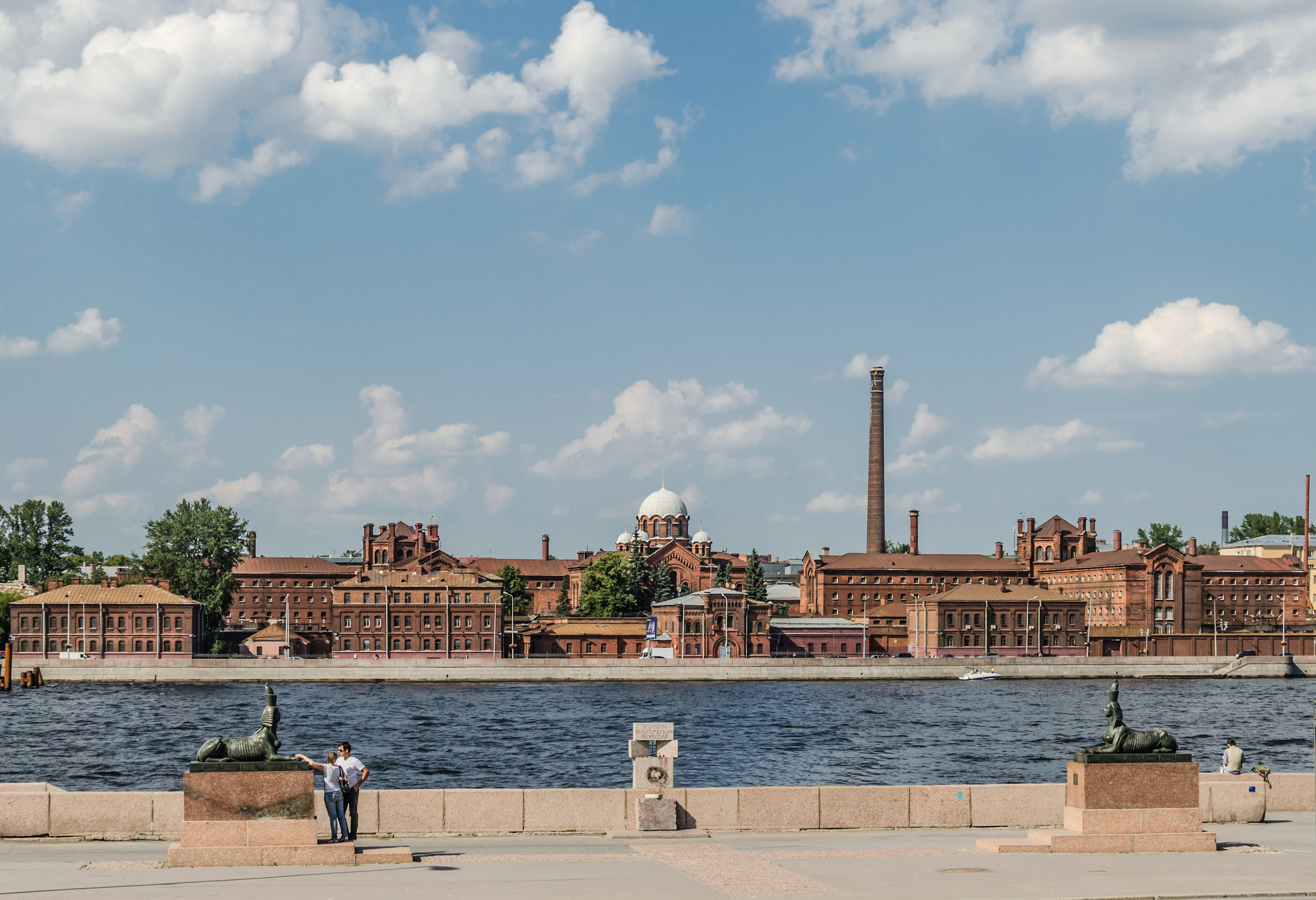
- Panorama of Voskresenskaya Embankment
- Interactive map of Memorial to the Victims of Political Repression
- Location: Voskresenskaya Embankment, 12-14 (Saint Petersburg)
- Designer: Mihail Chemiakin; Bukhayev, Vyacheslav Borisovich; Anatoly Vasiliev
- Type: Monument, Memorial
- Material: bronze, granite
- Height: ~ 3.3 meters
- Opening date: April 28, 1995

Memorial to the Victims of Political Repression (Russian: Памятник жертвам политических репрессий, «Метафизические сфинксы») in Saint Petersburg is a monument dedicated to millions of people who suffered from state terror in the USSR. It is located at the descent to the water on the Voskresenskaya Embankment of the Neva River, separating it from the legendary Kresty Prison, where many political prisoners were held. The central element of the monument is a pair of sculptures of "metaphysical sphinxes" by artist Mihail Chemiakin. Executed in the spirit of modernism, they feature - their faces are divided vertically into two halves. Facing the residential buildings on the embankment, the sphinxes have profiles of young female faces, and facing the Kresty prison on the opposite bank are exposed skulls. This symbolizes the tragic division of the people during the Soviet years. Around the perimeter of the sculpture pedestals are plaques with texts dedicated to Soviet repression, written by famous writers and dissidents. Between the sphinxes is a structure made of granite blocks in the form of an early Christian cross with a prison window and a crown of thorns made of barbed wire. The architectural solution of the monument was designed by Vyacheslav Bukhayev and Anatoly Vasiliev. The memorial was opened at the initiative of the sculptor and city authorities on April 28, 1995.

== Structure and symbolism ==
=== "Metaphysical Sphinxes" ===
The central element of the monument to the victims of political repression is a pair of bronze sculptures, "metaphysical sphinxes", which are mirror-symmetrically created by the artist Mikhail Shemyakin. They represent somewhat deformed figures of legendary creatures from the ancient world, with the body of a lion and the head and chest of a woman. The sphinxes lie on two granite pedestals with raised heads. Their bodies are emaciated, with ribs protruding on the animal torsos, thin necks exaggeratedly and anxiously stretched, and below, at the junction of the lion and human parts, expressive female breasts are located. The heads of the sphinxes are crowned with stylized ancient Egyptian headscarves, "nemes", and crowns, "pschents". The main feature of Shemyakin's creatures is their faces: they are divided vertically into two halves. Facing the residential buildings on the embankment, the sphinxes present profiles of youthful female faces, while facing the Neva and the Kresty prison on the opposite bank are exposed skulls. Thus, one side is perceived as living, beautiful, with sensually rising ribs, while the other is seen as dead, decaying, with the bones of a skeleton protruding on the corpse.

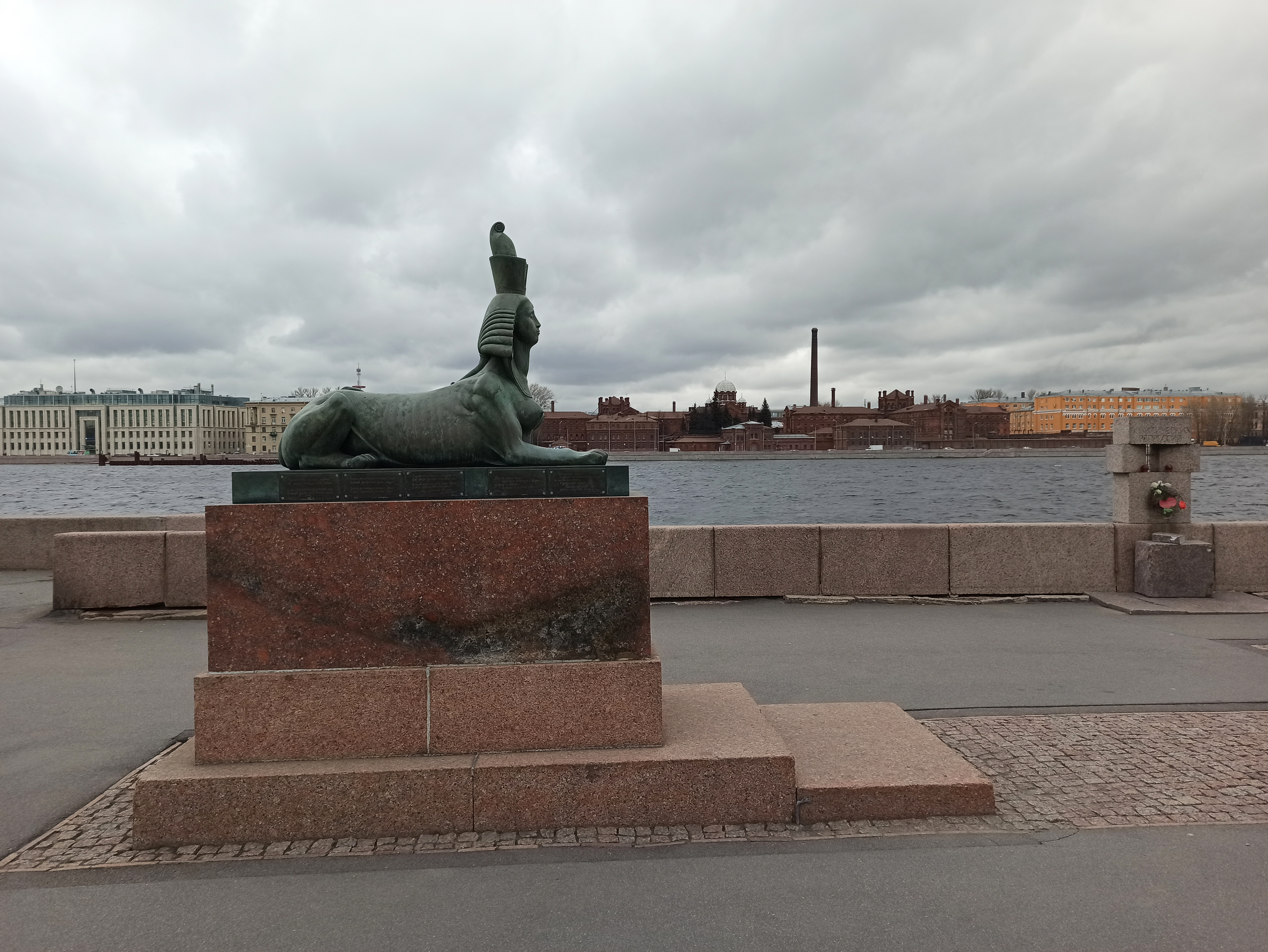

Voskresenskaya Embankment: Kresty and Sphinx

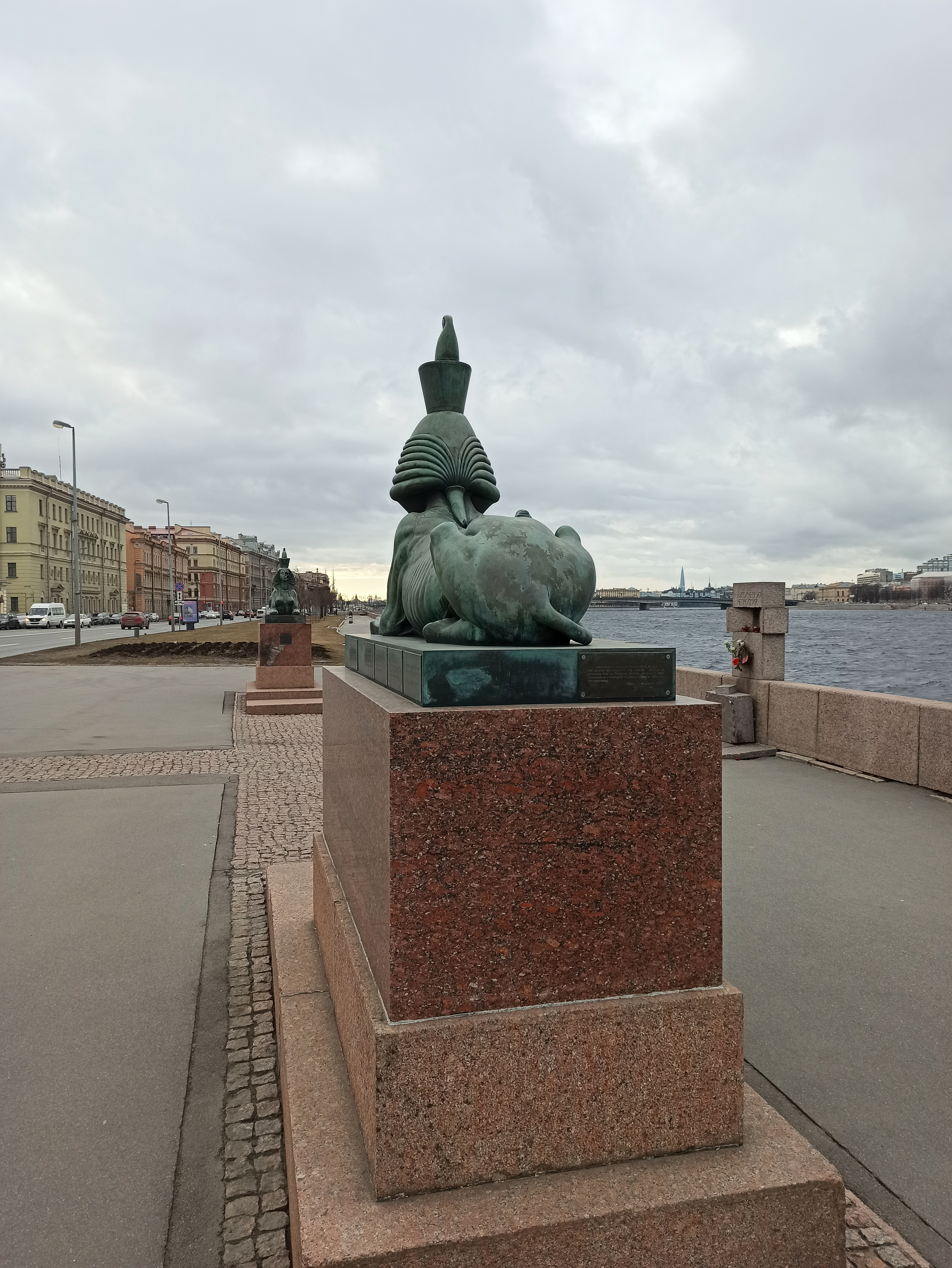

View along the embankment

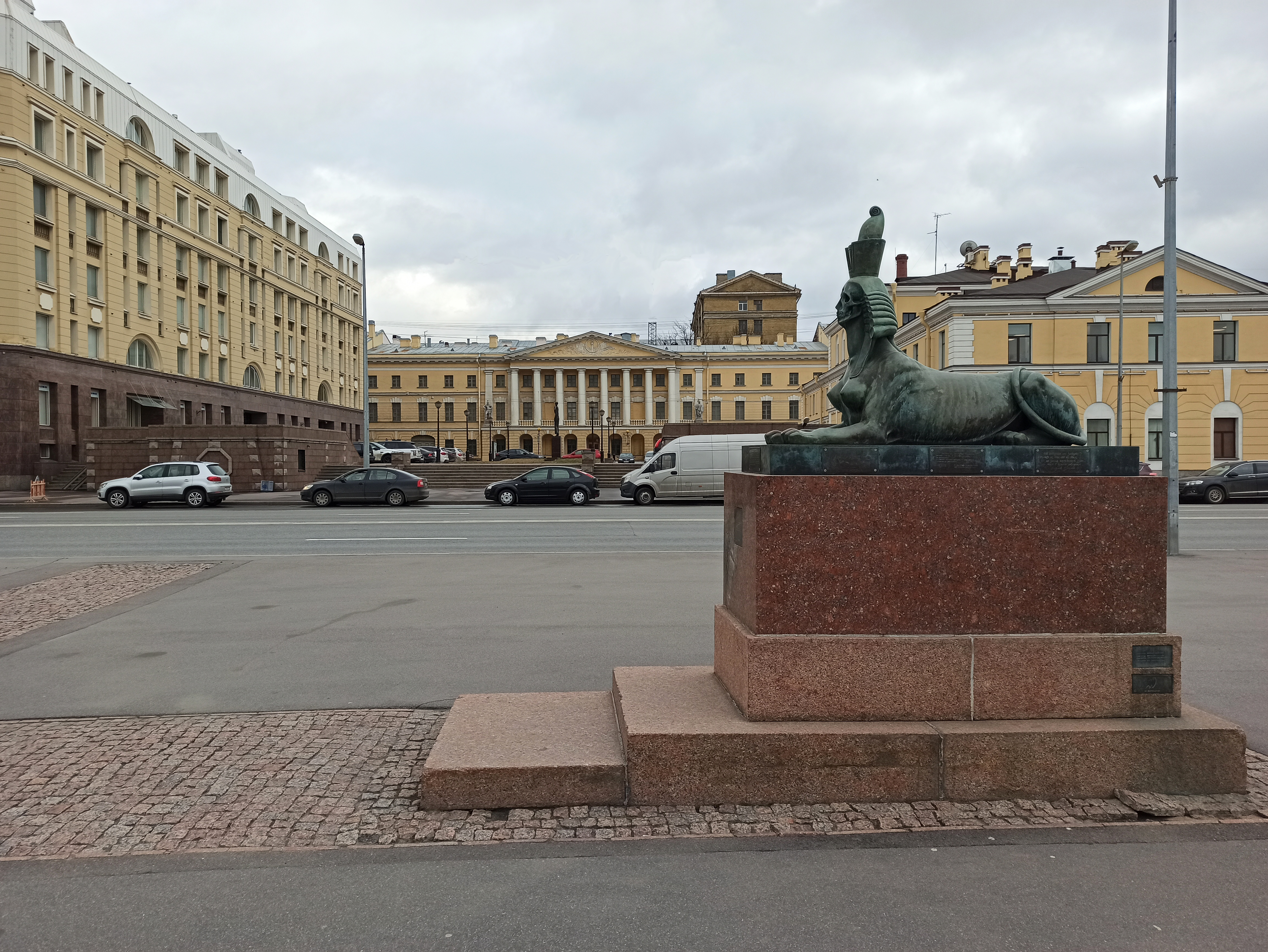

View of the Cavalry Regiment Barracks

Michail Shemyakin describes the symbolic significance of sculptures as follows: "The faces of the sphinxes are an embodiment of a cruel regime... This reflects the life of the country - one half lived in ignorance, while the others perished, it's unclear for what". As noted by critic Tatiana Voltskaya, "two-faced images symbolize life and death, freedom and slavery, as well as the duality of human nature, capable of rising to spiritual heights, as well as descending to mass murders and the destruction of entire peoples". According to poet and critic Viktor Krivulin, the sphinxes represent "the boundary between the living and the dead". Philologist and art historian Dmitry Likhachev saw in the sculptures the "face of the era", whose dead side embodies repression and their victims, while the living side represents secret resistance to them, the courage and hopes of Soviet dissidents. He denoted the pairing of figures as a symbol of the rift in Russian society, civil confrontations, and war, the division of Rus into the "ordinary" and the "oprichnina" (Russian: на «обычную» и «опричную»). Mikhail Shemyakin, who often explored the theme of the "cosmic-omniscient masquerade" and the mask of death as its central component, according to Victor Krivulin, introduced into the monument "elements of a certain modern tragic travesty and seemingly exposed the bloody-carnival underpinning of the idea of tyrannical power, the subconscious nature of dictatorship, which pushed a large part of Russia to the brink of life and death". Art historian Mikhail Zolotonosov noted the plastic expressiveness and meaningfulness of the sculptures of sphinxes, seeing in them "the concept of death, greedily and eagerly rushing upon a person, desiring him, full of eternal thirst for life". Researcher Alexander Etkind noted that the anthropo-zoomorphic images of Shemyakin's sphinxes are a rare example of an attempt to concretize the image in the poor Russian iconography of monuments to victims of political repression. He considered this monument a metaphor for passive suffering, the inability to resist evil and terror, which seem inevitable when faced with monsters, like death itself, and that it is very generalized and does not give an idea of the specific history of repression: about resistance, camp uprisings, torture, cruelty, violence, ideological underpinnings, and so on. Historian Anatoly Khazanov characterized the monument as a rare example of "exciting", expressive plasticity of the memorial to victims of state terror. Human rights activist Veniamin Iofe saw in the sphinxes a self-reflection of the authorities, "obvious tension of thought and desire to penetrate into the state subconscious", personification of guards-executioners and dictatorship.

The artist-postmodernist Mikhail Shemyakin proclaimed in his work the principle of "metaphysical synthesis", which involved the creation of new forms and iconography based on the study of cult art from various countries and epochs. "Metaphysical sphinxes" are reinterpreted images of their ancient Egyptian counterparts, installed on the University Embankment in St. Petersburg. In Ancient Egypt, such sculptures were part of the cult of the pharaoh, revered as a god and possessing unlimited power. At the same time, they were attributed mystical protective functions. Art historians see parallels between the sphinxes and Soviet Russia with its totalitarian dictatorship, cults of personalities like Lenin, Stalin, and Brezhnev, mass slave labor, and repression.

At the same time, Shemyakin's sphinx iconography includes an ancient interpretation. According to the myths of Ancient Greece, a creature in the form of a half-woman, half-lion was sent by the gods as punishment to the inhabitants of Thebes in Boeotia. The Sphinx ambushed travelers, posed them clever riddles, and killed those who couldn't solve them. Only Oedipus managed to solve the riddle, causing the creature to throw itself from a cliff in disappointment, leading Oedipus to become the king of Thebes but also opening the path to his tragic fate. The ancient sphinx image, inherited by modern art, found reflection in the works of Alexander Blok. In his poem "Scythians," written after the communist revolution, the poet declares: "Russia is the Sphinx! Rejoicing and mourning, // And bathed in black blood, // She looks, looks, looks at you // With hatred, and with love!.." Critics interpret Shemyakin's sphinxes as a metaphor for the state destroying its people.

==== "The Sphinx Road" ====
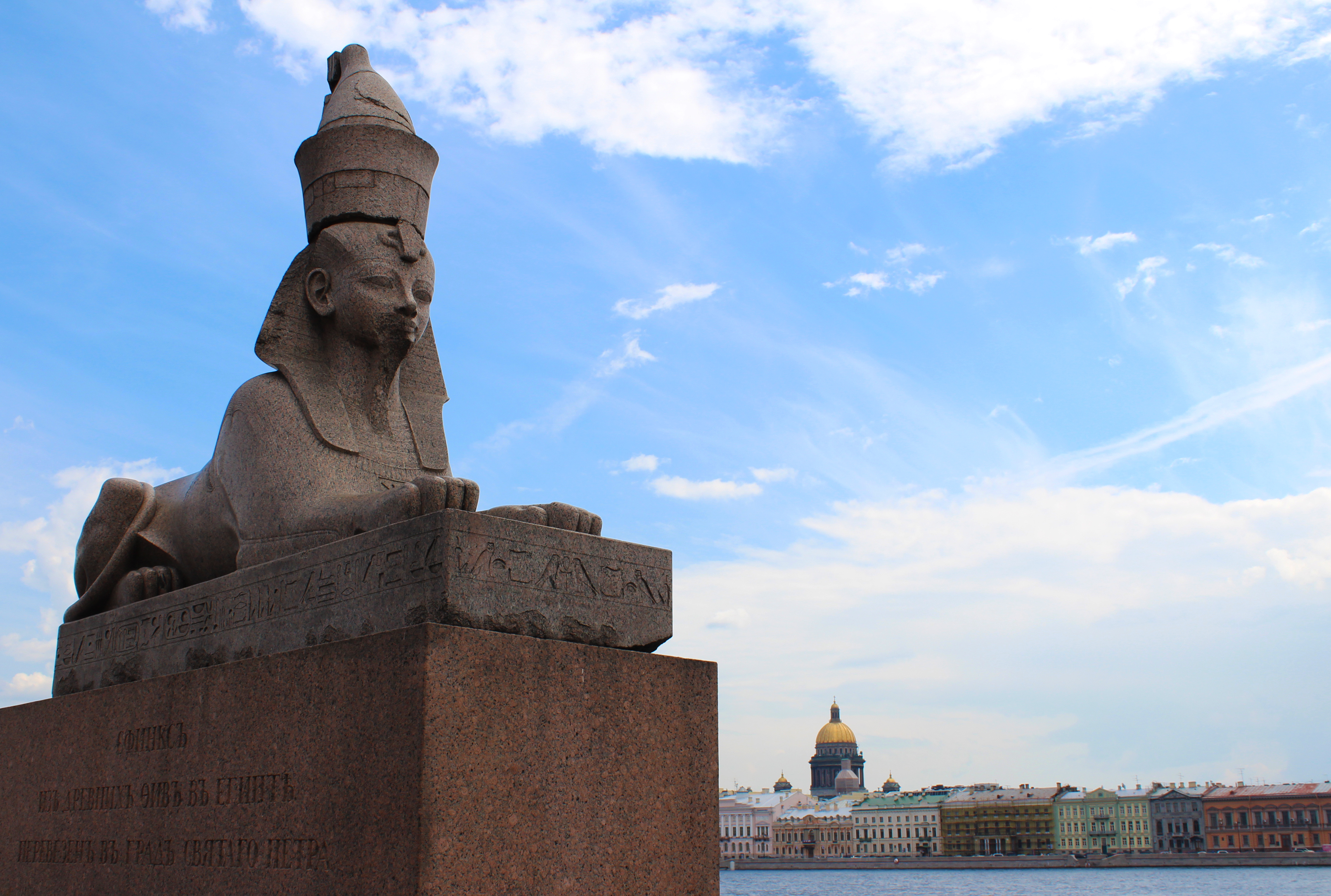
The Sphinx on Universitetskaya embankment, 17; XIV century BC

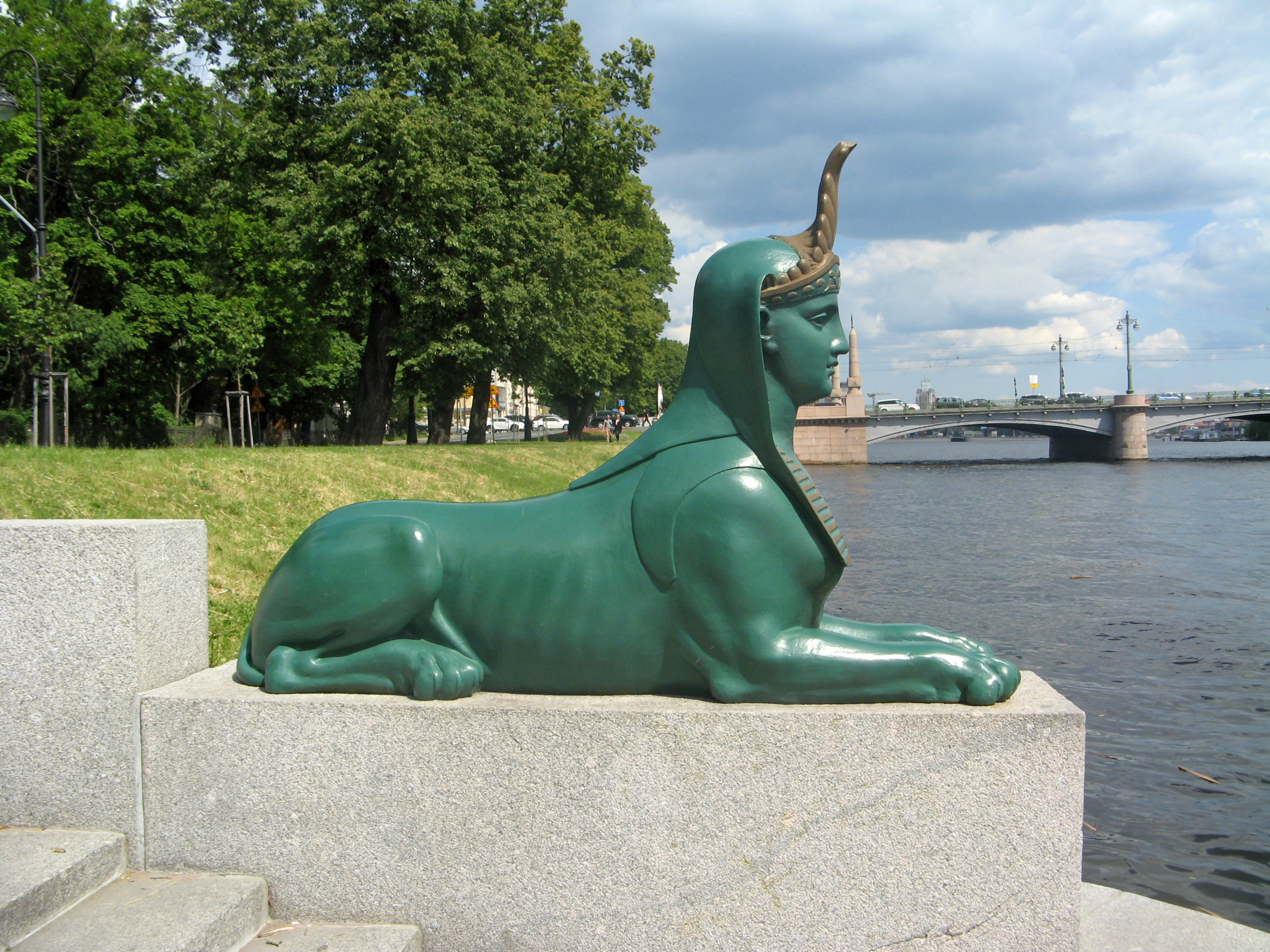
The Sphinxes on the Malaya Nevka embankment, 11; 1826. Pavel Sokolov

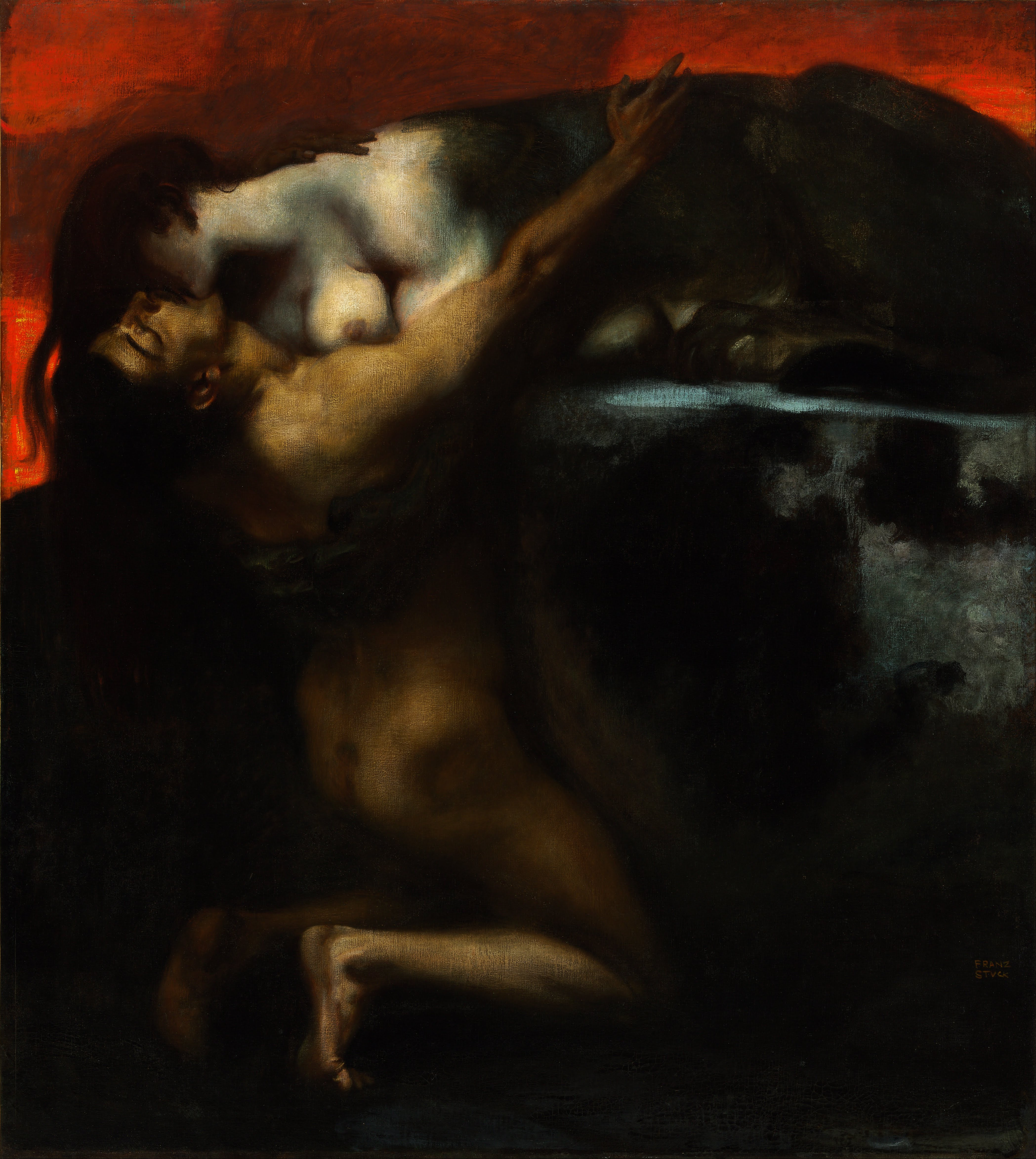
Sphinx's Kiss; 1895. Franz von Stuck

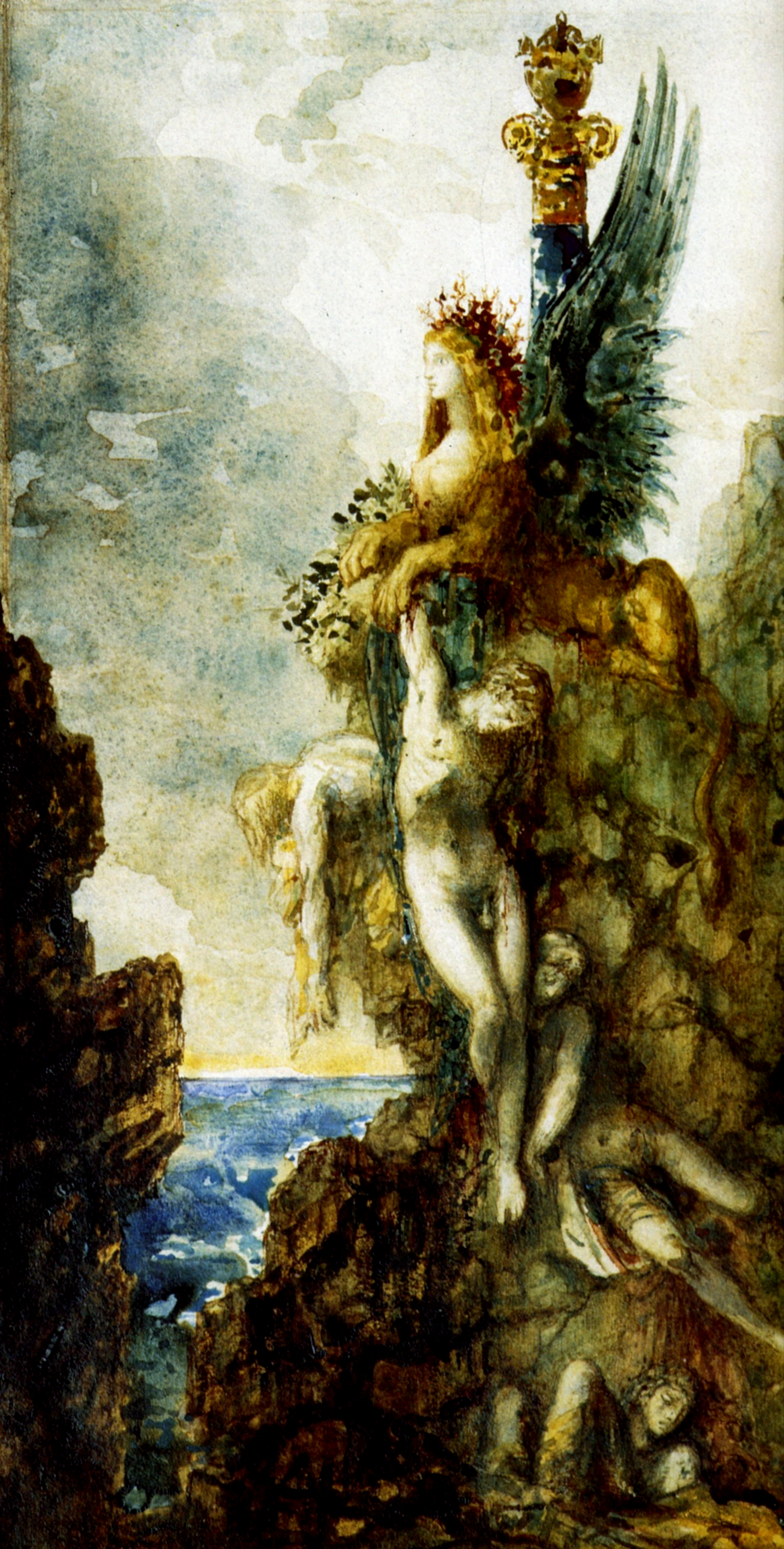
Triumph of the Sphinx; 1886. Gustave Moreau

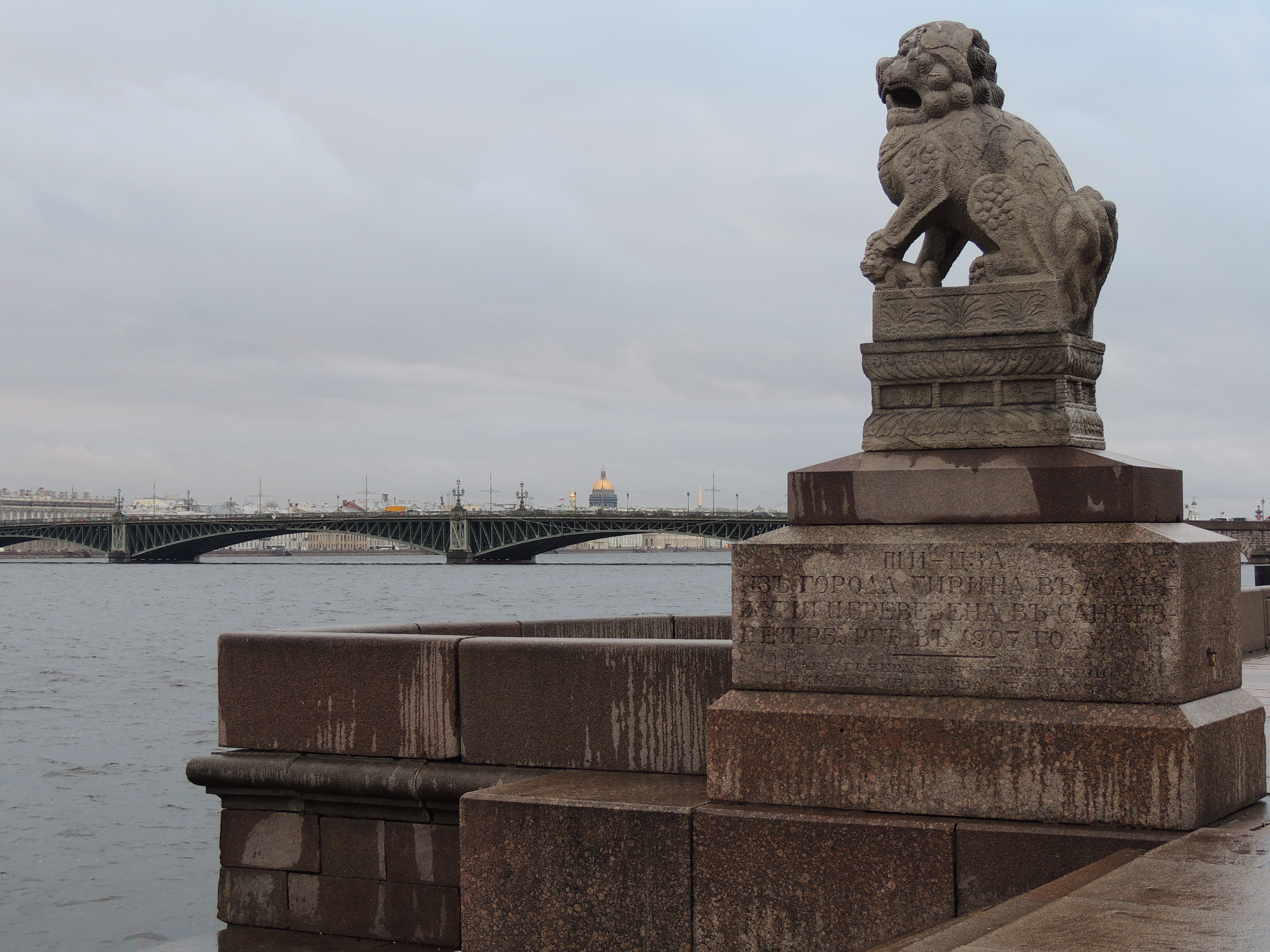
"Sphinxes" shishi on Petrovskaya embankment, 6 beg. 20 century

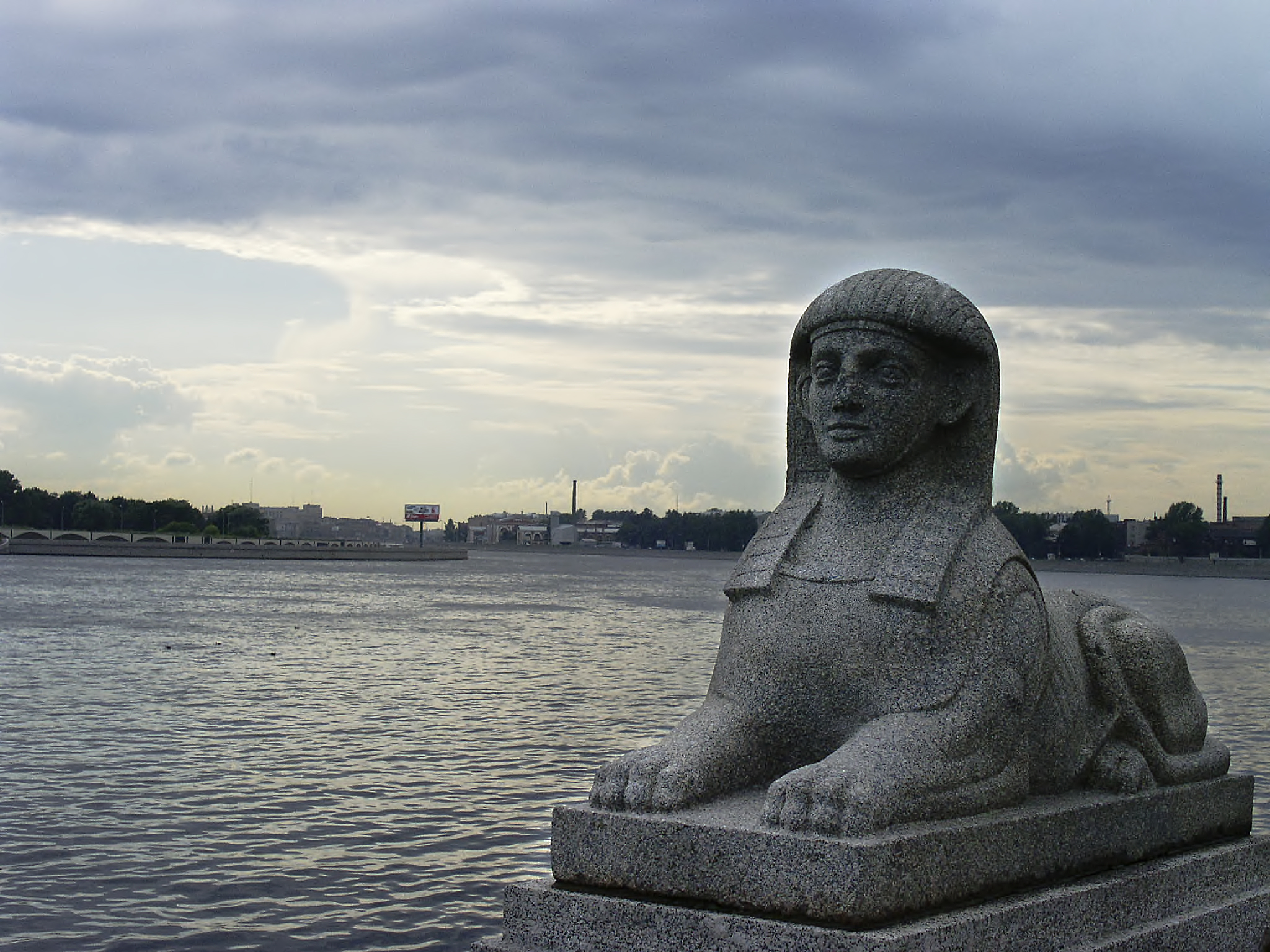
Sphinxes on Sverdlovskaya embankment, 40; 1773-1777, restored 1959–1960, architect. A. L. Rotach

Art historian Dmitry Likhachyov characterized Shemyakin's sphinxes as a continuation of the "sphinx road" on the banks of the Neva River in St. Petersburg. According to him, it starts with the sphinxes on University Embankment, located opposite Senate Square, where the Decembrist Uprising occurred in 1825, foreshadowing the empire's future collapse. The chain continues with the Chinese shishi placed near the last palace of the Romanovs after the defeat in the Russo-Japanese War and the 1905 Revolution (these events heralded the communist revolution). The third pair is located on Kamenny Island, next to buildings serving the Soviet party elite, marking the tragedy of Soviet Russia. Shemyakin's sphinxes, dedicated to the victims of repression and installed opposite the dreadful Kresty prison, conclude this tragic path. According to Likhachyov, the monument "simultaneously represents its era and interprets it in historical perspective".

In the work of the postmodernist artist Mikhail Shemyakin (and in the specific case of "metaphysical sphinxes"), art historians note the influence of Russian ("World of Art") and German (Franz von Stuck, Max Klinger) modernism, particularly symbolism and surrealism. These sculptures are also an example of contemporary Egyptian revival. Shemyakin's sphinxes not only break with the tradition of Soviet monumental sculpture but also stand apart from contemporary avant-garde monuments.

The figures of the sphinxes are proportionate to human height, the height of the sculpture is 1.5 meters, and the dimensions of its pedestal are 2.3 × 0.8 × 1.8 meters. According to Viktor Krivulin, such a size of the figures, which somewhat does not correspond to the scale of the embankment, was a deliberate gesture of rejecting megalomania in favor of humanizing the monument's image. (Note: According to another version retold by Mikhail Shemyakin, the original project with five-meter sculptures simply did not find funding.).

=== Design ===
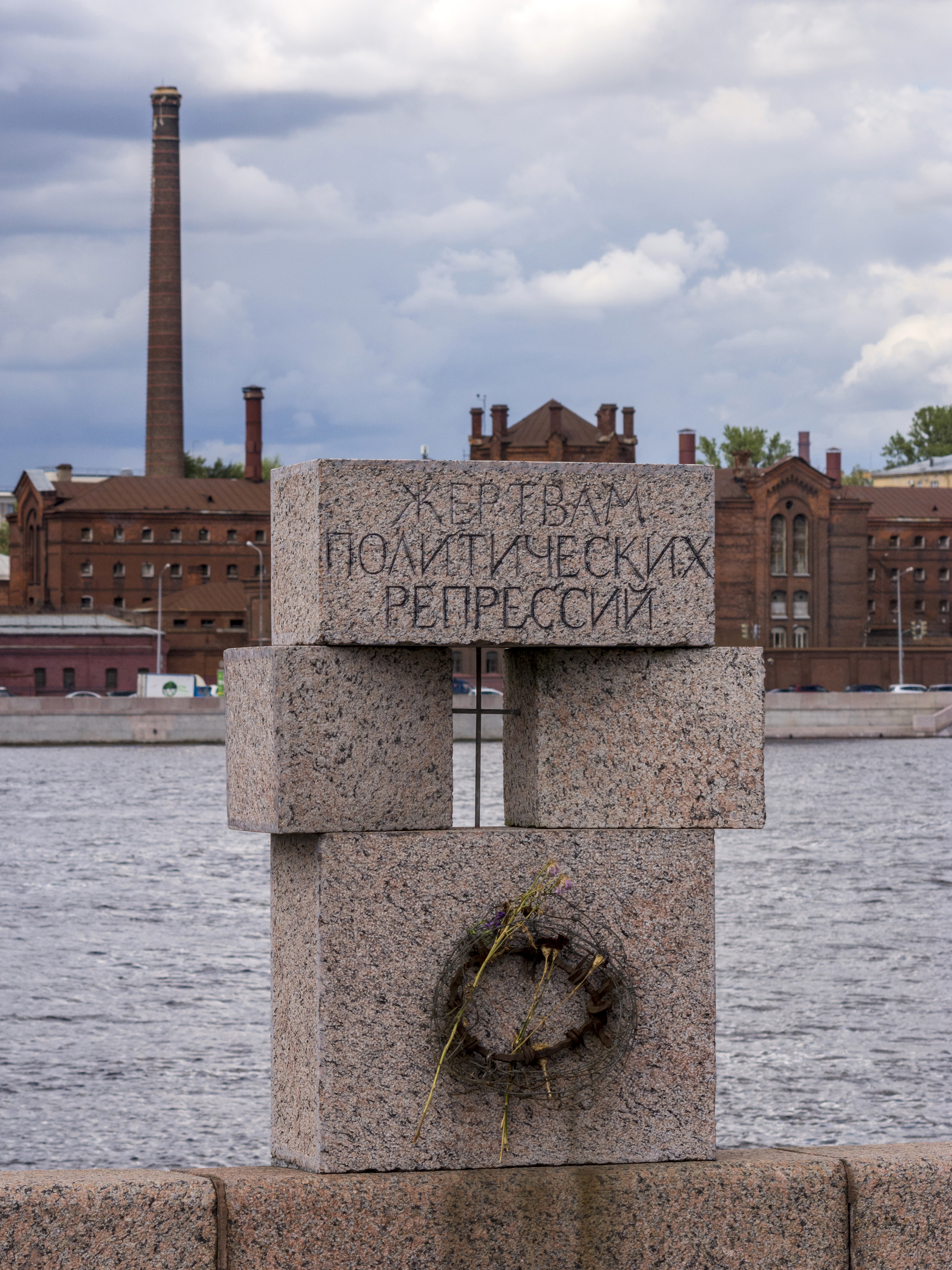
The memorial

The architectural design of the monument was executed by Vyacheslav Bukhaev and Anatoly Vasilyev. The memorial is situated in front of the descent to the water on the Voskresenskaya Embankment of the Neva. The sculptures on the pedestals stand slightly apart from its granite parapet. The distance between the sphinxes facing each other is fifteen meters. In the middle of the embankment's parapet, there is a structure made of four granite blocks, which are arranged in such a way as to form the shape of an early Christian cross with a small hole in the center. This stylized prison window is covered with a lattice in the form of a thin iron cross. Through it, the viewer's gaze is focused on the "Kresty" prison located on the opposite bank of the Neva. The inscription "To the Victims of Political Repression" is carved on the upper block. A wreath made of barbed wire, a kind of crown of thorns, is attached to the lower one. A fifth block is attached to the parapet underneath, on which lies a closed book (either the Soviet Penal Code or a list of victims). This structure is perceived by critics as a peculiar allegory of prison and faith. Between the sphinxes and the embankment, a cross made of paving stones is laid out, its ends oriented towards three elements of the monument's composition. The number of stones in it, according to the authors' intention, corresponds to the number of repressed individuals in the USSR — ten thousand victims per stone. Researcher Alexander Etkind notes that the symbolism of the cross is one of the most common in the iconography of monuments to victims of political repression in Russia: this language allows expressing grief for the killed (although it does not reveal the circumstances of death and crime).

=== Location ===
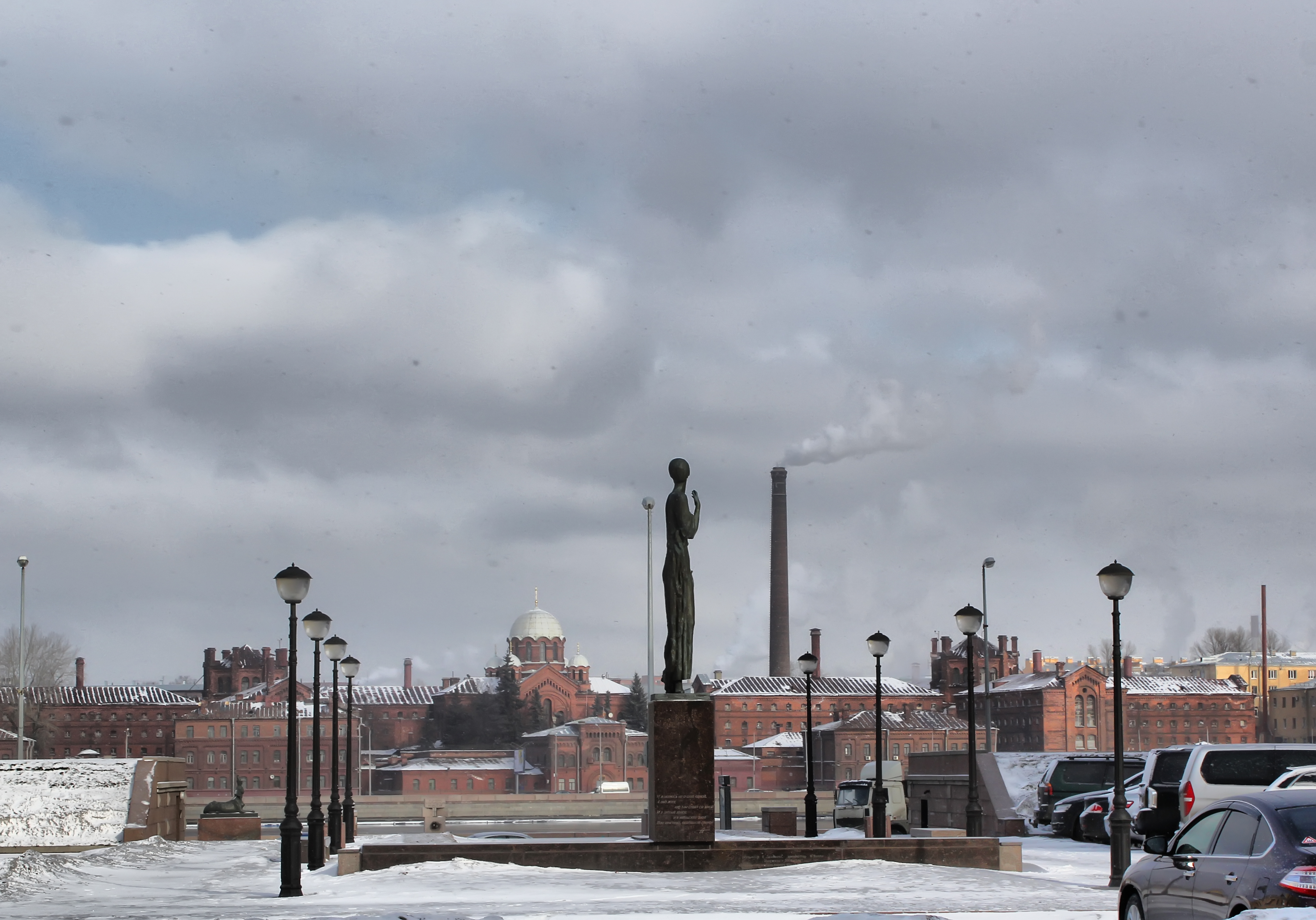
View of the embankment from Shpalernaya Street

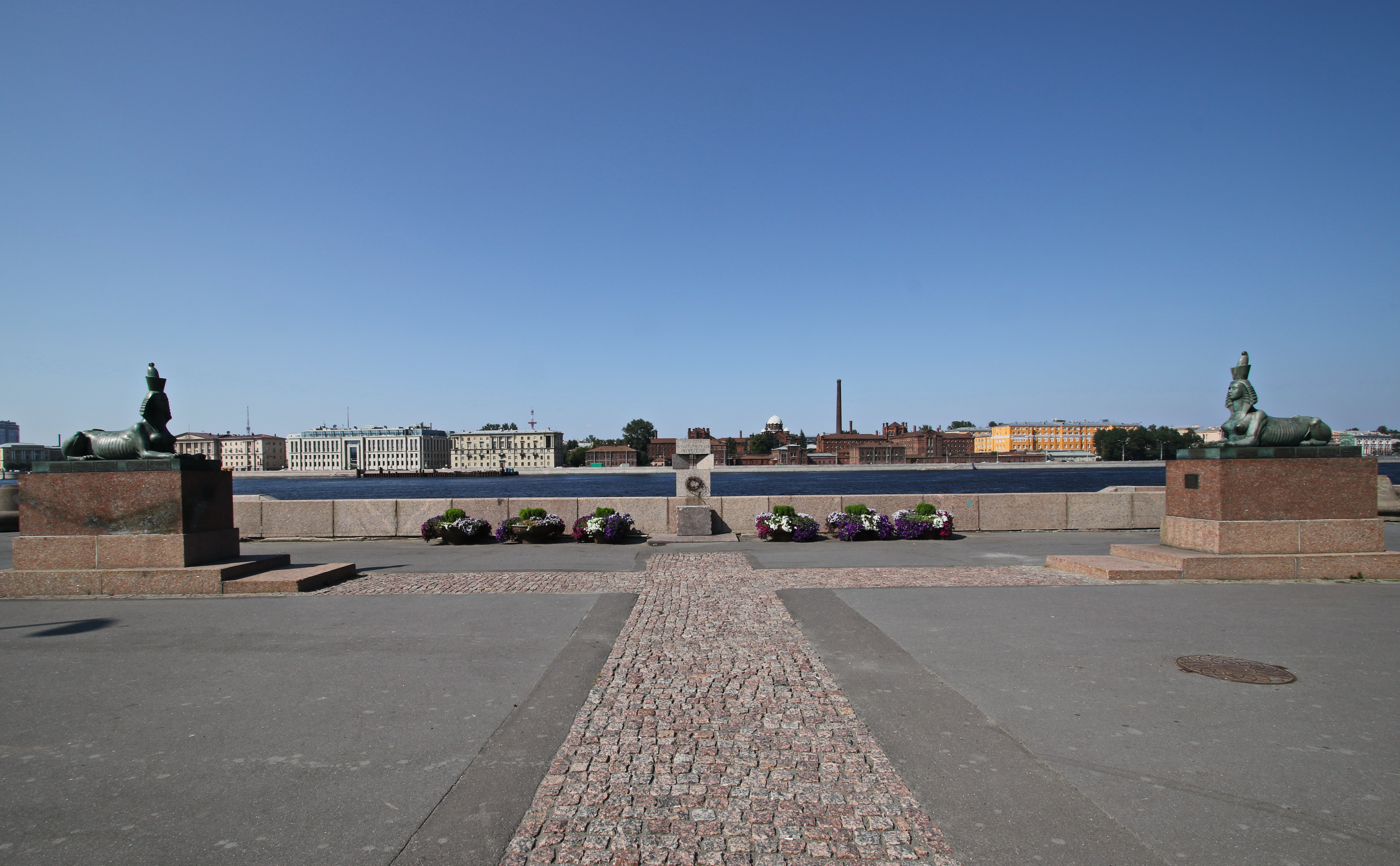
Monument with flowers, July 2018

The location of the monument holds significant symbolic value. Directly across the Neva, a large panorama of the complex of red brick buildings of the Kresty Prison is visible. It naturally becomes part of the memorial composition as a background and another highly expressive symbol of repression. The "Kresty" prison became legendary due to the numerous political prisoners housed there during Soviet times. It is specifically described in Anna Akhmatova's poem "Requiem" dedicated to Stalinist repressions. Also nearby (4 Liteyny Avenue) stands the "Bolshoy Dom", built in the early 1930s as the residence of the authorities responsible for the terror of the NKVD-KGB (now the building is occupied by their successor, the FSS). Political prisoners were interrogated and killed there. According to urban legend, the blood of those killed in the basements of this building flowed into the Neva through sewage pipes, coloring the river water red. In the late 1980s, a significant amount of information about political repressions became public knowledge, but the burial sites of their victims remained a secret. For this reason, starting from 1988, citizens began to float flowers on the water on the first Saturday of June in memory of the killed whose graves are unknown, from the embankment between the "Bolshoy Dom" and the Kresty prison.

Alexander Etkind notes that although the memorial stands in close proximity to places of terror, they themselves remain untouched. This situation is characteristic of most monuments to the victims of political repression in Russia. Etkind interprets this as evidence of the absence of socio-political consensus in society regarding the memory of state terror, as well as the inheritance of Soviet power by the current authorities.

Across the road from the monument, in the square between houses 12 and 14 along the embankment, stands the monument to Anna Akhmatova, unveiled in 2006. Created according to the "literary will" of the poetess outlined in "Requiem", it serves as a kind of continuation of the memorial to the victims of political repression.

The embankment on which it stands was once named after Maximilien Robespierre, which can be seen as a reference to the history of state terror of another revolution — the Great French.

=== "Anthology" of the Monument ===
Around the perimeter of the bronze pedestals of Shemyakin's sphinxes, a series of copper plaques are attached, on which lines from the works of Varlam Shalamov, Nikolai Gumilev, Osip Mandelstam, Anna Akhmatova, Nikolay Zabolotsky, Daniil Andreev, Dmitry Likhachov, Joseph Brodsky, Yuri Galanskov, Alexander Solzhenitsyn, Vladimir Vysotsky, Vladimir Bukovsky, and Andrei Sakharov are engraved. These texts constitute a kind of "anthology" of the monument on the theme of political repression in the USSR, all of them created by people who suffered from them in one way or another and fought against them. According to a number of researchers, literature has become the main monument to the history of state terror in Russia. And these inscriptions are of great importance, as they reveal the semantic content of the memorial.

The texts for the monument were selected by Vyacheslav Bukhayev and Mikhail Yupp. Vladimir Bukovsky composed and sent his own statement. Mikhail Shemyakin chose excerpts from Brodsky and Vysotsky.

== Assessments and significance ==
Critics highlight the monument on Voskresenskaya Embankment as one of the most well-known and significant memorials to the victims of political repression in Russia, alongside the Solovetsky Stones in Moscow and Saint Petersburg, the Mask of Sorrow in Magadan, and others. However, according to researcher Alexander Etkind and Italian historian Maria Ferretti, due to the lack of consensus in society and the government regarding the assessment of state terror in the USSR, this monument, like all similar ones, has a "marginal" character, not fully revealing or addressing all aspects of the tragic Soviet history.

== History ==
Immediately after the October Revolution in 1917, the communist authorities began a policy of terror against the citizens of the country. Over the seventy years of Soviet rule, millions of people became victims of political repression. This policy also affected the creators of the monument. The relatives of the architect Vyacheslav Bukhaev perished in the camps. The sculptor Mihail Chemiakin, being a nonconformist artist, was subjected to punitive psychiatry and was expelled from the country in 1971.

The idea of creating a monument to the victims of political repression arose for Shemyakin long before the perestroika era. Initially, he wanted to create a large-scale composition of sphinxes five meters high surrounded by allegorical figures, embodying, for example, the poet Alexander Blok and the simple-minded The Man with the Gun Nikolai Pogodin. However, the artist eventually rejected this project. The sculptures of "metaphysical sphinxes" installed on the embankment were created by Shemyakin as early as 1992, as evidenced by the dates engraved on their pedestals (Note: Several sources, including the website of the Mikhail Shemyakin Foundation, erroneously state the year 1994.) Initially, they were dedicated to the Old Testament theme of the enslavement of the Jews in Egypt, and stars of David were placed on the sphinxes' pedestals. Later, these sculptures formed the basis of the monument to the victims of repression, with the stars at the base covered by "anthology" plaques.

The initiative to create this memorial came from Mikhail Shemyakin and the city authorities, particularly from the Governor of Saint Petersburg, Anatoly Sobchak. The financial expenses for the creation and installation of the monument were undertaken by the sculptor himself and representatives of the business community. The monument was ceremoniously unveiled on April 28, 1995. The opening ceremony included speeches by Governor Anatoly Sobchak, public figures Dmitry Likhachev and Veniamin Iofe. The monument was also consecrated by an Orthodox priest.

From the very beginning, the creation of the monument sparked much controversy and criticism. City authorities were accused of autocracy, voluntarism, and favoritism in the selection of the project and its author. Critics pointed out that the monument was hastily created, exclusively at the whim of officials, bypassing the artistic council, open competition, and public discussion, including organizations of former political prisoners and the commission for the restoration of the rights of rehabilitated victims of repression. Activists reproached the authorities for abandoning the implementation of a similar public project on Troitskaya Square. Critics spoke of the ambiguity and obscurity of the created image. Many wrote that the sphinxes embodied "angels of death," that they were more a monument to the executioners and the authorities than to the victims of repression. Journalists also noted that originally created as independent art objects, the sphinxes do not reveal the theme of the monument. The artist was accused of speculating on an important topic. Critics wrote about the low artistic value, unsuccessful composition, scale, and location of the monument. There were even loud accusations that the cross in the middle of the composition allegedly represented Catholicism. The city's chief architect nearly disrupted the opening of the monument, citing the allegedly poor processing of the granite pedestals. A separate scandal arose when public organizations of former political prisoners were initially not invited to the opening ceremony.

The monument has been subjected to vandalism and desecration on multiple occasions. In the early days, some plaques were stolen from the sphinxes' pedestals. Later, vandals stole a wreath, followed by a bronze rose attached to the cross-like structure. Journalist Alexander Nevzorov smeared the sphinxes with white paint for his scandalous broadcast. In April 2001, on Hitler's birthday, the monument suffered significant damage: vandals toppled the central part from the granite parapet of the embankment. Governor Valentina Matviyenko allocated funds for the repair of the memorial. The central part underwent some changes: a "crown of thorns" appeared on it (instead of the lost rose), a dedicatory inscription, and a pedestal with a book. In early 2015, the pedestal with the book was overturned and the pavement was damaged. In this case, specialists blamed municipal services, who accidentally damaged the monument during snow removal. During the summer, the granite book was pried off and stolen from the central part of the memorial In these instances, reconstruction of the monument proved to be a significant challenge as it had not been transferred to the city's balance sheet, but it was eventually repaired. In 2020, the book was stolen again but was quickly replaced

Flowers at the memorial following the death of Alexei Navalny

Traditionally, on the Day of Remembrance of the Victims of Political Repressions, flowers are laid at the memorial. However, unlike the Solovetsky Stone on Troitskaya Square, the monument on Voskresenskaya Embankment is not often the center of any actions. In 2008, antifascists held a rally near it in support of Alexey Bychin. In 2017, it became one of the points of the "Pelevinu55" campaign aimed at drawing attention to Russia's literary heritage In 2019, on the day of the murders of Markelov and Baburova, antifascists, left-wing activists, and democratic movements staged an unauthorized march, in which several hundred people participated, from Chernyshevskaya metro station to the sphinxes, where they laid flowers. Speakers at the memorial expressed their opposition to torture in the Ministry of Internal Affairs and the Federal Penitentiary Service system, as well as in defense of the defendants in the "Network" case. In 2020, on the day of the political prisoner, LGBT activists unfurled a rainbow banner at the monument, expressing opposition to the killings of gay men in Chechnya, as well as the persecution of activists Yulia Tsvetkova in Khabarovsk and Alexander Merkulov in St. Petersburg. On February 6, 2021, flowers were laid at the monument as part of a protest against the arrest of Alexei Navalny. On February 14, feminists held a "chain of solidarity" at the monument with women political prisoners. On February 27, activists honored the memory of murdered politician Boris Nemtsov at the memorial. On March 25, there was a solidarity action in support of the arrested leaders of the Ingush protest at the sphinxes. The increased popularity of the memorial is explained by some activists as being due to less police control over it. On February 16, 2024, people laid flowers on the memorial in memory of Alexei Navalny.

== Literature ==
- Золотоносов М. Н. (2010). "136. Мемориал «Жертвам политических репрессий»". Бронзовый век: иллюстрированный каталог памятников, памятных знаков, городской и декоративной скульптуры Ленинграда-Петербурга, 1985—2007 гг (in Russian). СПб.: Новый мир искусства. pp. 231–236. ISBN 978-5-902640-07-3.
- Исаченко В. Г. (2004). "Памятник жертвам политических репрессий". Памятники Санкт-Петербурга: Справочник (in Russian). СПб.: Паритет. p. 315. ISBN 5-93437-188-6.
- Кривдина О. А., Тычинин Б. Б. (2007). "Жертвам политических репрессий". Скульптура и скульпторы Санкт-Петербурга. 1703-2007: Иллюстрированная энциклопедия (in Russian). СПб.: Logos. pp. 64, 151. ISBN 978-5-87288-317-3.
- Кривулин В. Б. (1998). "Царь и сфинкс". Охота на мамонта. Русский Пен-Клуб (in Russian). СПб.: Русско-Балтийский информационный центр «БЛИЦ». pp. 101–110. ISBN 5-86789-073-2.
- Лихачёв Д. С. (1998). "Сфинксы напротив Крестов". Всемирное слово (in Russian). 10. СПб.: 99–101.
- Петряков А. М. (2015). Михаил Шемякин. Зазеркалье Мастера (in Russian). М.: Олма Медиа Групп. p. 480. ISBN 978-5-373-07521-3.
- Пирютко Ю. М. (1999). "Между Ленинградом и Петербургом. Памятники на исходе столетия (1986—1999)". Невский архив: Историко-креведческий сборник. Вып. IV (in Russian). СПб.: Изд-во Чернышева. pp. 464–479. ISBN 5-85555-040-0.
- Тимофеев В. Н., Ефремова Н. Н., Пирютко Ю. М. и другие. (2002). "Жертвам политических репрессий, памятник". Памятники Санкт-Петербурга: справочник (in Russian). СПб.: Государственный музей городской скульптуры; Арт-Бюро. p. 320. ISBN 5-900786-17-X.
- Шемякин. Альбом (в 2-х томах) (in Russian) (2-е изд. ed.). М.: Азбука. 2014. p. 1184. ISBN 978-5-389-06919-0.
- Эткинд А. М. (2004). "Время сравнивать камни. Постреволюционная культура политической скорби в современной России". Ab Imperio. 2: 33–76. ISSN 2166-4072.
- Эткинд А. М. (2016). Кривое горе: Память о непогребенных. Библиотека журнала «Неприкосновенный запас» (in Russian). М.: Новое литературное обозрение. p. 328. ISBN 978-5-4448-0508-4.
