= Musée Imaginaire of Mihail Chemiakin =

Research project by artist Mihail Chemiakin

Mihail Chemiakin's Musée Imaginaire
- Established: 1963; 62 years ago
- Founder: Mihail Chemiakin

Mihail Chemiakin's Musée Imaginaire is a research project of the artist Mihail Chemiakin, who considered the history of art from the point of view of the transformation of images. The basis of the research methodology is the interpretation and systematization of visual images.

The studies are presented in the form of sheets with images pasted on them, grouped according to the principle of visual commonality, be it thematic, stylistic, figurative, or iconographic.

== Musée Imaginaire ==
Mihail Chemiakin's project was partially inspired by an essay by Andre Malraux, who first formulated the concept of "Musée Imaginaire". He suggested comparing works of art from different cultures and eras in order to analyze the change in the image or, as Malraux writes, metamorphoses. In addition, he suggested that each person create his own personal museum, selecting works without relying on the opinion and limited choice of large institutions. This became possible thanks to the mass distribution of photographs and reproductions of art works.

The Musée Imaginaire appears as an alternative to the classical museum in the evaluation of contemporary art, for which clear aesthetic requirements are not defined. Mihail Chemiakin chose the purpose of his personal museum — the analysis of the forms of artists of different cultures and eras to find their original source. For example, he came to the conclusion that Christian iconography St. Lazarus and the ancient Egyptian mummy are the primary sources of a large number of works of art using the image of swaddling, bandaging and wrapping.

== The history of the creation of "Mihail Chemiakin's Musée Imaginaire" ==
What later took shape in the project dates back to the 1960s:

"At one time, in the distant 60s, I began to collect, compare and analyze reproductions of works of fine and ritual art - Metaphysical heads, Metaphysical figures — in order to synthesize the commonality of the works of different masters, to understand the essence of the image and on the basis of this try to create a new sign system in the art of the twentieth century. Over the years, the search and the number of topics have been expanding, in parallel with the development of my creativity and the expansion of my analytical visual experience"

These first theoretical searches in the field of transformation of the artistic form, which the artist mentions, formed the basis of his future "Musée imaginaire".

As the project expanded into hundreds of topics over several decades, it became clear that the research that Mihail Chemiakin looked at as a creative method has scientific potential for specialists in different fields. Since then, Chemiakin calls himself:

"the successor of the work of this great French art critic, philosopher and thinker"

The artist increasingly turned his attention to research topics not directly related to his work, themes that he noticed and identified as he constantly sought out and analyzed works of art from ancient times to the present. and provoked.

"Mihail Chemiakin's Musée Imaginaire" — 60 years of research on the transformation of images and symbols in art in their semantic variability and psychological dynamics. The result of the analytical process of "Mihail Chemiakin's Musée Imaginaire" are lectures, books and exhibitions.

== Analog archive ==
The "Musée Imaginaire" has millions of images from rare books, albums, catalogs and other sources. The scale of the research surpasses the collections of other "Musées Imaginaires" created by curators or artists.

Since 2007, the materials of the "Musée Imaginaire" have been located in France, in the Chateau de Chamousseau, where Mihail Chemiakin continues to replenish the collection and his analytical work. Mihail Chemiakin's studios are also located here.

=== Headquarters of the "Musée Imaginaire" ===
Claverack, New York, USA (until 2007)

Saint Petersburg, Russia (since 2002)

Chamousseau, Villedieu-sur-Indre, France (since 2007)

== Digital Museum ==
In 2022, the "Digital Musée Imaginaire" was created, an online platform with the archive of "Mihail Chemiakin's Musée Imaginaire".

The project's core materials were digitized. On the basis of the digitized archive, a "smart" navigation system and the use of AI (artificial intelligence) methods have been created.

Numerous projects have been created based on the "Musée Imaginaire's" research material.

== Project results ==
Exhibitions of the project have been held in dozens of cities in Russia and in the United States. Seven books have been published about the "Musée Imaginaire" project and several dozen films have been shot.
