= Derek Marlowe =

English author, playwright, screenwriter (1938–1996)

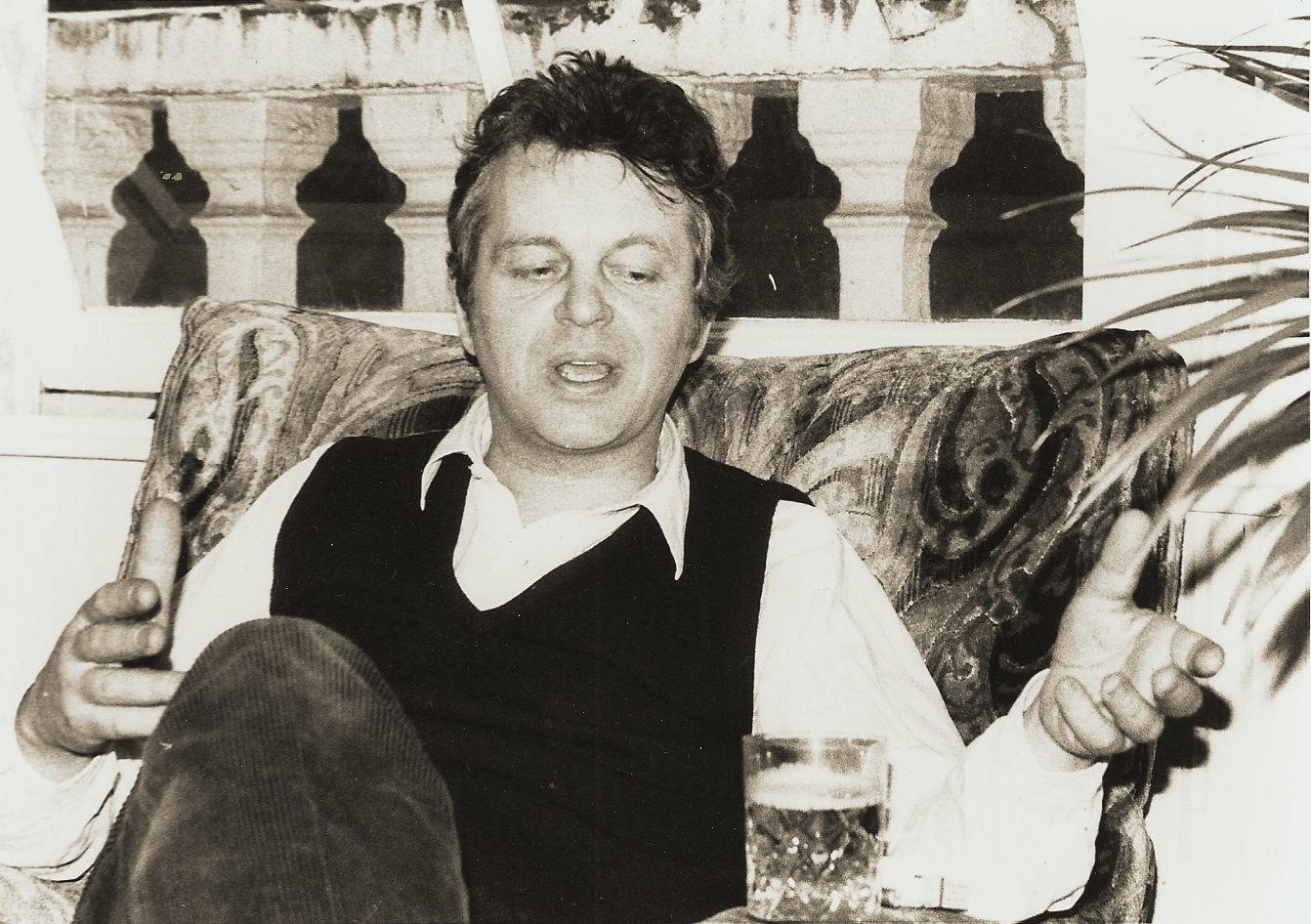
- Born: 21 May 1938; Perivale, Middlesex, England
- Died: 14 November 1996 (aged 58); Los Angeles, US
- Occupations: Author & screenwriter
- Writing career
- Period: 1960–1996
- Genres: Mystery, recent history

Derek William Mario Marlowe (21 May 1938 – 14 November 1996) was an English playwright, novelist, screenwriter and painter.

== Life ==
Derek Marlowe was born in Perivale, Middlesex, and lived there and in Greenford as a child. His father was Frederick William Marlowe (an electrician) and his mother Helene Alexandroupolos. He had early education at Cardinal Vaughan Memorial School in Holland Park.

In 1959 Marlowe went to Queen Mary College of the University of London to study English literature. Marlowe calls his time spent there the unhappiest years of his life. He never finished his degree course – Alex Hamilton claims he was expelled for "satire and kindred villainies". Marlowe wrote and edited an article for the college magazine, a parody of J. D. Salinger's novel The Catcher in the Rye which reflected what Marlowe called "the boredom of college seminars." However, the college had a particularly fine theatre (the former People's Palace in Mile End Road) and Marlowe became part of a core theatre group there. In 1960 the college group formed a semi-professional theatre company, the 60 Theatre Group, and took their production of Tennessee Williams' play Summer and Smoke to the Edinburgh Festival Fringe, with Marlowe in the leading role opposite Audrey "Dickie" Gaskell.

At college, Marlowe was a contemporary of the poet Lee Harwood, and after leaving he shared a flat with fellow writers Tom Stoppard and Piers Paul Read.

Marlowe also painted. A 1962 work entitled A Slight Misfit featured fragments of a portrait of actress Marilyn Monroe that Marlowe had painted then torn up. He then "pasted the pieces into a jumble of newspaper and magazine clips." Marlowe told Life magazine that he created this collage because "I just wanted to get this misfiting face... on a background of the press."

He married Susan Rose "Suki" Phipps, daughter of Veronica Nell Fraser-Phipps and stepdaughter of Sir Fitzroy Maclean, in 1968; together they had a son, Ben, to add to Suki's two sons and two daughters from a previous marriage. They divorced in 1985 and in 1989 he moved to Los Angeles, where he wrote a number of scripts for television, including the award-winning Two Mrs. Grenvilles, Abduction of Innocence and an episode of Murder, She Wrote.

While working there, he developed leukemia, and died of a brain hemorrhage after a liver transplant. He was cremated in California, but his ashes were brought back to England by his sister, Alda. At the time of his death he was planning to return to England and complete a tenth novel, Black and White.

Novelist Nicholas Royle calls Marlowe one of the two biggest influences on him as a writer. "Both flit in and out of genres, appealing to genre readers and mainstream readers at the same time. And both write beautifully, which I aspire to do."

== Career ==
=== Theatre ===
In 1960 he adapted a story, The Seven Who Were Hanged by Leonid Andreyev, for the stage. The 60 Theatre Group first produced the play at the Edinburgh Festival Fringe in 1961, and later took it to a student theatre festival in Zadar, Croatia (then Yugoslavia). It was produced in London as The Scarecrow in 1964, and won the Foyle award. In 1962 Marlowe adapted Maxim Gorki's book The Lower Depths for the London stage.

=== Novels ===
Marlowe also wrote nine novels and a fragment of a tenth. Alex Hamilton believes that "the notion of the successful man who loses his way is the key preoccupation in Marlowe's books."

He published his first novel A Dandy in Aspic in 1966. The idea for the book began when he travelled to Berlin on a Ford Foundation grant to attend a "colloquium on creative writing" with Günter Grass and Uwe Johnson. Marlowe wrote the books in four weeks while working as a clerk at National Benzole and struggling with a play that he'd been attempting to write. The book was a best-seller and was subsequently filmed. Spy author Alan Furst calls the book wonderful and terrific. Nicholas Royle cites the novel as the fifth greatest debut novel ever written, though adding that Marlowe would go on to write "even better novels". According to Alex Hamilton, the American and British editions have different endings owing to the American publisher's dislike for the protagonist's death in a car accident.

According to a 1976 interview, Marlowe believed that his 1969 novel A Single Summer With L.B.: The Summer of 1816 was his finest. In 1979 actor Robert Powell said that he intended to produce and star in an adaptation of the novel; Powell would play Lord Byron.

Marlowe returned to the world of espionage in his 1970 novel Echoes of Celandine which was subsequently filmed as The Disappearance starring Donald Sutherland.

Marlowe's 1972 novel Do You Remember England? is a semi-autobiographical work.

To research his 1975 supernatural novel Nightshade, Marlowe and his wife visited Haiti. There, Aubelin Jolicoeur – "a black dwarf dandy with a white suit and cane" – escorted them everywhere. The novelist Graham Greene had fictionalised Jolicoeur as Petit Pierre in his novel 1966 The Comedians. The novel ultimately took a year to write.

Despite his admiration for his earlier novel A Single Summer With L.B., Marlowe ultimately believed that his 1979 novel The Rich Boy From Chicago – another partly semi-autobiography work – was his finest and the "quintessence of all I have written."

Marlowe died before he could finish Black and White. A fragment appears in an anthology published by Nicholas Royle.

In a letter to an aspiring teenage writer, Marlowe wrote "Never think too hard about what you are going to write – just jump in. I've never known the end of my book, nor even the middle until after I am halfway through."

Nicholas Royle finds it baffling "that a writer of Marlowe's quality, his style and sensibility setting him apart from all competition, has been out of print for so long."

=== Screen work ===
His first work for the screen was as co-author with Larry Kramer of a semi-documentary about swinging London called Reflections on Love (1966) which featured some of the Beatles. Around this time Marlowe and Joe Massot – who had directed Reflections of Love – collaborated on a story for a film project called The Mercenary. This eventually became the 1971 film Universal Soldier.

In 1968 he wrote the screenplay of his own novel A Dandy in Aspic, directed by Anthony Mann and starring Laurence Harvey as the double agent ordered to assassinate his own alter ego. Marlowe felt Harvey was miscast and did a terrible job finishing the film after director Mann died during production.

He wrote four episodes of the BBC television series The Search for the Nile in 1971, which subsequently won him an Emmy and a Writers' Guild of Great Britain "Best British Documentary Script" award. Owing to a novel Marlowe was working on, Michael Hastings wrote the two remaining episodes.

Other screenplays include Jamaica Inn, Nancy Astor, A Married Man, The Two Mrs Grenvilles, and Grass Roots. His last work was a feature-length episode of Murder, She Wrote produced posthumously in 1997. The episode contained an In Memory-note for him in the closing credits.

Several of his screenplays remain unfilmed. These include a draft script for the 1977 James Bond film The Spy Who Loved Me. His screenplay The Knight is set during the Crusades about a knight seeking vengeance against those who killed his family. The project was to have been shot in England, Ireland and France in 1980 for EMI Solo Films. Ridley Scott was to have directed.

== Works ==
=== Theatre ===
- The Seven Who Were Hanged (adapted from Leonid Andreyev's novel of the same name), produced in Edinburgh (1961); produced in London as The Scarecrow (1964)
- The Lower Depths (adapted from Maxim Gorky's play of the same name), produced in London (1962)
- How Disaster Struck the Harvest, produced in London (1964)
- How I Assumed the Role of a Popular Dandy for Purposes of Seduction and Other Base Matters, produced in London (1965)

=== Books ===
Novels

- A Dandy in Aspic (1966)
- Memoirs of a Venus Lackey (1968)
- A Single Summer With L.B.: The Summer of 1816 (1969; published in the US as A Single Summer With Lord B in 1970)
- Echoes of Celandine (1970) (re-published as The Disappearance in 1978)
- Do You Remember England? (1972)
- Somebody's Sister (1974)
- Nightshade (1975)
- The Rich Boy from Chicago (1979)
- Nancy Astor (1982; based on Marlowe's own screenplay; published in the US as Nancy Astor, the Lady from Virginia: A Novel)

Short fiction

- "1916 Was a Very Good Year" (unknown year), published in Vogue
- "Sweet Nothing" (1991)
- "Digits" (1992)
- "Black and White" in Nicholas Royle, ed. (1998). Neonlit: Time Out Book of New Writing. Vol. 1. London: Quartet. ISBN 0704380900.

=== Magazine articles ===
- Marlowe, Derek (8 November 1976). "Soliloquy on James Dean's Forty-Fifth Birthday". New York. 9 (45): 41 (google books 361).

=== Films and television ===
- Reflections on Love (1966; short film)
- A Dandy in Aspic (1968; based on his own novel)
- Omnibus: A Requiem for Modigliani (1970)
- Universal Soldier (1971; story only)
- The Search for the Nile (1971)
- A Month in the Country (1978; based on the Ivan Turgenev play)
- Nancy Astor (1982)
- A Married Man (1983; based on the Piers Paul Read novel)
- Jamaica Inn (1983; based on the Daphne du Maurier novel)
- The Adventures of Sherlock Holmes: The Greek Interpreter (1985; based on the Arthur Conan Doyle story The Adventure of the Greek Interpreter)
- The Adventures of Sherlock Holmes: The Resident Patient (1985; based on the Arthur Conan Doyle story The Adventure of the Resident Patient)
- First Among Equals (1986; based on the Jeffrey Archer novel)
- The Two Mrs. Grenvilles (1987; based on the Dominick Dunne novel)
- Jack the Ripper (1988; with David Wickes)
- Grass Roots (1992)
- The Corpse Had a Familiar Face (1994; with Dennis Turner)
- Deadline for Murder: From the Files of Edna Buchanan (1995, certain characters only)
- Abduction of Innocence (1996)
- Murder, She Wrote: South by Southwest (1997)

== Bibliography ==
- British Broadcasting Corporation (1972). BBC Handbook 1972. British Broadcasting Corporation.
- Hamilton, Alex (2012). Writing Talk: Conversations with Top Writers of the Last Fifty Years. Troubador Publishing Ltd. pp. 83–87. ISBN 9781780883397.
- Rubin, Steven Jay (1981). The James Bond Films: A Behind the Scenes History. Arlington House. ISBN 978-0-87000-523-7.
- Souza, Raymond D (1996). Guillermo Cabrera Infante: Two Islands, Many Worlds. University of Texas Press. ISBN 9780292785786.
