= The Seven Who Were Hanged =

1908 novella by Leonid Andreyev

- An English-language edition of The Seven Who Were Hanged
- Author: Leonid Andreyev
- Language: Russian
- Genre: Psychological horror
- Publication date: 1908
- Publication place: Russian Empire
- Media type: Print (Hardback and Paperback)

The Seven Who Were Hanged (Russian: Рассказ о семи повешенных) is a 1908 horror novella by Russian author Leonid Andreyev.

== Plot ==
A minister learns of a foiled assassination plot on him by five leftist revolutionaries, and this inflicts trauma on his peace of mind. The novella then switches to the courts and jails to follow the fates of seven people who have received death sentences: the five failed assassins, an Estonian farm hand who murdered his employer, and a violent thief. These condemned people are awaiting their executions by hanging. In prison, each of the prisoners deals with their fate in his or her own way.

== The seven prisoners ==
=== Assassin group ===
- Tanya Kovalchuk. Leader of the terrorist group and motherly figure, who worries more for her friends' fate than her own.
- Werner (full name unknown). A morose and internally bitter man, he learns to feel sympathy and love at the novellas end.
- Musya (full name unknown). Youngest member of the group, who finds solace in the idea of martyrdom.
- Sergei Golovin. Ex officer, who copes with his approaching execution by concentrating on his health and an exercise routine called the Müller system.
- Vasily Kashirin. Most terrified of death amongst the conspirators.

=== Other prisoners ===
- Ivan Yanson. An Estonian farm hand at a Russian estate. He kills his master and tries to rape the master's wife. He appears confused and mentally weak. He only fears death when his sentence nears.
- Tsiganok Golubets. A Russian bandit and thief from Orel. He is to be executed for murder and is proud of his brutal acts, acting mostly jovially towards his execution.

== English translations ==
- Seven Who Were Hanged translated by Herman Bernstein (1909)
- The Seven That Were Hanged translated by Thomas Seltzer (1925)
- Seven Hanged translated by Anthony Briggs (2016)
- The story was dramatised by Derek Marlowe and performed by the 60 Theatre Group at the Edinburgh Festival Fringe in 1961. A later London production, titled The Scarecrow, won a Foyle award.

== Film adaptions ==
- Rasskaz o semi poveshennykh (Story of Seven Who Were Hanged), dir. Pyotr Chardynin (1920) Russian silent film.
- Balada o siedmich obesených (The Seven Who Were Hanged) dir. Martin Hollý (1968) Slovakian black and white film.
