= A Dandy in Aspic =

1968 British spy film directed by Anthony Mann

- Theatrical poster
- Directed by: Anthony Mann; Laurence Harvey (uncredited)
- Written by: Derek Marlowe
- Based on: A Dandy in Aspic by Derek Marlowe
- Produced by: Anthony Mann
- Starring: Laurence Harvey; Tom Courtenay; Mia Farrow; Peter Cook; Harry Andrews
- Cinematography: Christopher Challis; Austin Dempster
- Edited by: Thelma Connell
- Music by: Quincy Jones
- Distributed by: Columbia Pictures
- Release dates: April 2, 1968 (United States); April 4, 1968 (London)
- Running time: 107 minutes
- Country: United Kingdom
- Language: English

A Dandy in Aspic is a 1968 British spy film directed by Anthony Mann and starring Laurence Harvey, Tom Courtenay and Mia Farrow, with costumes by Pierre Cardin. It was written by Derek Marlowe based on his 1966 novel of the same title. It was filmed in Technicolor and Panavision and was Mann's final film.

Set against the backdrop of 1960s Cold War Europe, it is the story of a spy known to his superiors in British Intelligence by his code name "Eberlin".

== Plot ==
Krasnevin, a KGB agent and assassin, has successfully infiltrated London society and the British Intelligence community as wealthy businessman Alexander Eberlin. After Kraznevin is forced to kill several British agents who come too close to revealing his identity, British Intelligence Chief Fraser – apparently unaware that Eberlin and Krasnevin are the same man – orders Eberlin to eliminate Krasnevin.

Krasnevin decides to sacrifice his KGB contact, Pavel, who is already a suspect, but before Pavel can be killed the Russians do the job for him. British Intelligence learns that Krasnevin is still at large. Eberlin is paired with rival British agent Gatiss, who has never liked Eberlin and suspects Eberlin's allegiances. They are sent to West Berlin to apprehend Henderson, another double agent now suspected as Krasnevin.

Arriving in West Berlin with Eberlin's lover, socialite and photographer Caroline Hetherington, Krasnevin's paranoia grows as Gatiss begins to suspect that they are after the wrong man. On finding Henderson, Krasnevin quickly kills him before he can reveal Krasnevin's identity. Their handlers in London then inform them Henderson was not Krasnevin. Gatiss makes an arrangement with KGB Bureau Chief Sobakevich: US$100,000 for the identity of Krasnevin. Sobakevich, aware of Krasnevin's identity and value, serves up another British agent, dead. Gatiss, angered because he wanted Krasnevin taken alive, kills Sobakevich. Their British handlers recall Eberlin and Gatiss to London.

Krasnevin briefly contacts his KGB handler and discovers that Fraser has known Krasnevin's identity all along, and has just manipulated him and Gatiss into eliminating Krasnevin's entire network.

With nowhere to run, Krasnevin forces a confrontation with Gatiss at the West Berlin airport, and the two agents kill each other.

== Cast ==
- Laurence Harvey as Eberlin
- Tom Courtenay as Gatiss
- Mia Farrow as Caroline
- Harry Andrews as Fraser
- Peter Cook as Prentiss
- Lionel Stander as Sobakevich
- Per Oscarsson as Pavel
- Barbara Murray as Miss Vogler
- John Bird as Henderson
- Norman Bird as Copperfield
- Geoffrey Bayldon as Lake
- Calvin Lockhart as Brogue
- James Cossins as Heston-Stevas
- Michael Trubshawe as Flowers
- Geoffrey Lumsden as Ridley
- Elspeth March as Lady Hetherington
- Richard O'Sullivan as Nevil
- Mike Pratt as Greff
- George Murcell as Sergeant Harris
- Vernon Dobtcheff as Stein

== Production ==
Filmed on location in London and West Berlin, this was Anthony Mann's final film. He died of a heart attack before it was finished and its direction was completed by Harvey.

== Music ==
Unidentified orchestra arranged and conducted by Quincy Jones including Carol Kaye (electric bass) and Earl Palmer (drums).

== Reception ==
The Monthly Film Bulletin wrote: "One wonders what Bresson might have made of Derek Marlowe's novel, which is in one way a completely routine spy thriller, and in another, anything but. The point about the novel is that when Eberlin, the double agent, finds that he has been assigned to kill himself, it is as if he were paralysed by the irony of his position. All the usual spy things happen, violence proliferates, he acts and is acted upon; but because he is aware that he is securely caught in a trap (and the book sees events exclusively from his point of view), all this action is merely vain fluttering, leading nowhere and having no real meaning. In a very real, Bressonian sense, the action takes place in Eberlin's mind, where exterior events are seen, as it were, through a glass darkly, imponderably adding to or subtracting from his chances of survival. The film, predictably, opts for a straightforward actionful approach, with the result that what we get is a totally routine spy thriller. ... The plot, in fact, just isn't strong enough or inventive enough to withstand this sort of clumsy exteriorisation, and the result is deadly dullness."

The New York Times described it as "a very wobbly spy movie ... slow, blank, decorous and completely devoid of suspense."

Variety called the film as a "routine, poorly-titled espionage meller loaded with uninteresting, cardboard characters."

Leonard Maltin's Movie Guide rates the film 2 out of 4 stars and describes it as a "wooden spy melodrama in which principals keep switching sides so rapidly it becomes impossible to follow."

Time Out said: "the film is strong on Cold War atmospherics and notable for its superior cast."

Leslie Halliwell said: "Muddled, pretentious spy thriller; flat, nebulous and boring."

In The Radio Times Guide to Films David McGillivray gave the film 2/5 stars, writing: "The spy cycle of the 1960s produced a handful of serious espionage dramas, one of which is this unsuccessful, two-dimensional adaptation of Derek Marlowe's complex novel. Laurence Harvey is dull as the double agent assigned by British Intelligence to kill himself. Bodies pile up so fast, it becomes almost impossible to know who is doing what to whom. It cannot have helped that director Anthony Mann died during production; the film was completed by Harvey. "

== Home media ==
A Dandy in Aspic was released to DVD on 1 August 2011 by Sony Pictures Home Entertainment as a DVD-on-demand title available through Amazon. A limited edition Blu-ray disc with extensive bonus materials was released in the United Kingdom on 25 March 2019. In 2020, it became available for streaming on The Criterion Channel.
