= The Red Laugh =

1904 novella by Leonid Andreyev

- Author: Leonid Andreyev
- Original title: Красный смех
- Language: Russian
- Publisher: Znaniye
- Publication date: 1904
- Publication place: Russia
- English publication date: 1905

The Red Laugh (Russian: Красный смех, romanized: Krasny smekh) is a 1904 novella by the Russian writer Leonid Andreyev. It consists of a fragmented monologue from a Russian officer who describes how the experience of war drives him and others to madness. The story was written in response to the Russo-Japanese War and first published in an anthology from the publishing collective Znaniye. It was first published in English translation in 1905.
