= Rose of the World (1991 book) =

Religious text by Daniil Andreyev

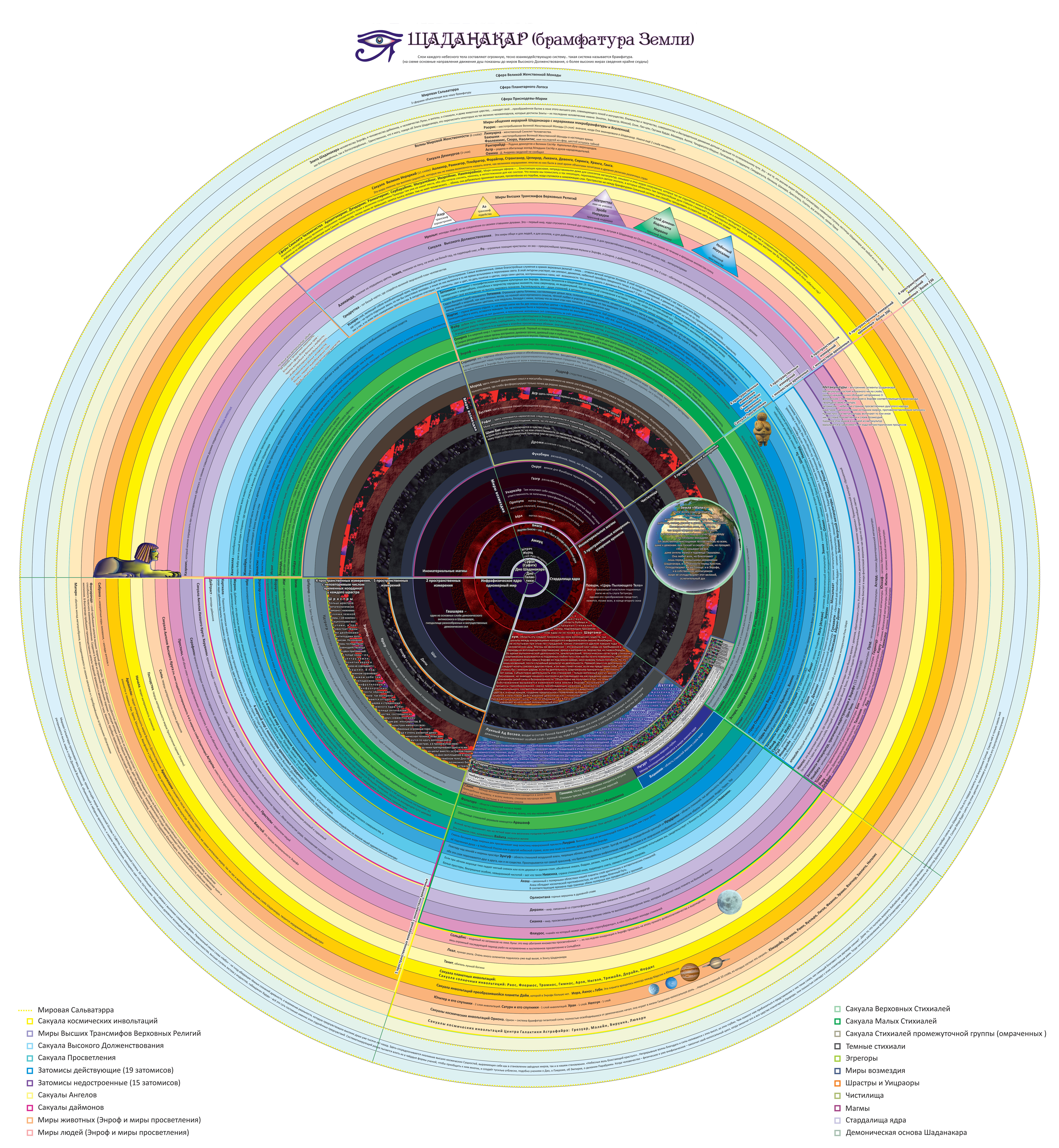
- Scheme of Shadanakar (systems of parallel worlds connected with the Earth, described in Rose of the World)
- Author: Daniil Andreev
- Language: Russian
- Genre: Religious philosophy Esotericism
- Publisher: Samizdat (self–publishing); Prometheus (legal publisher)
- Publication date: 1958 (self–publishing); 1991 (legal publisher)
- Publication place: Union of Soviet Socialist Republics
- Media type: Book

Rose of the World (Russian: Роза Мира) is a religious and mystical work by Daniil Andreev, based on his mystical insights in the Vladimir Prison. The book was created over many years and was completed in October 1958. Before the first legal publication (1991), it was distributed by self–publishing.

== Content ==
According to Grigory Pomerants, Daniil Andreev's book does not have exact correspondences in mystical and visionary literature, its closest analogues are Dante's Divine Comedy and the Birth–Giver of God's Walk Through Torment, but Andreev's mythological, cultural and philosophical system is not limited to the system of one creed. The basis of Andreev's worldview was the "new religious consciousness" of the early 20th century, the mystical quest of Blok, Bely, Voloshin. At the core is a poetic text, which is characterized by "immediacy of vision", and not theological deliberation. Olga Dashevskaya defines the genre of Rose of the World as a metaphilosophical treatise, which, first of all, should be studied by philologists, since it is part of the literary processes of the 1930–1950s, having a powerful philosophical and aesthetic background. The key category of the book is myth, since by its nature Andreev's book is the author's mythology of the new time, in which all previous myth–making is rethought. The myth of Rose of the World, both cosmogonic and eschatological, is a coherent, systematized metamythology with an extensive chain of characters and concepts.

The universe is presented in the treatise as multi–layered, the middle layer of which – the abode of humankind – is called Enrof. Daniil Andreev attached to his treatise a list of 54 basic concepts and widely used neologisms, the origin of which has not yet been practically studied. According to Alexander Gritsanov, "the extravagant categorical and conceptual series inherent in Andreev's constructions were explained by his desire to reproduce in the spectrum of the traditional sound range those unusual names that were perceived by spiritual hearing". The Worlds of Enlightenment rise above the middle world, and the heavy Worlds of Retribution lead down. The culture created by each people is connected with the forces of Light, but in earthly expression it is subject to the influence of dark forces, especially the demons of statehood. Heavenly Russia rises above earthly Russia, the name of her cathedral soul is Navna; the demon of great–power statehood – Zhrugr. The life of the Universe is a constant struggle of the divine forces of Good and Light with Evil and Darkness doomed to defeat. The history of humankind is a projection of the interaction of beings inhabiting the light and dark worlds. A special role in the mystery of the formation of humankind is played by people of art, who are the messengers connecting the forces of Light with Enrof (the material Universe of the natural sciences). Andreev wrote that his predecessors in the role of messengers were Alexander Pushkin, Alexander Blok, Fyodor Dostoevsky, Vladimir Solovyov and especially Mikhail Lermontov; they all possessed the gift of "contemplation of cosmic panoramas and metahistorical perspectives". Actually, Rose of the World, from his point of view, is the future of the united humanity, in which the states will be replaced by the Brotherhoods, as well as its religion, which will enlighten the world around the 24th century.

== Influence ==
Daniil Andreev’s teachings inspired the emergence of a new religious movement in post-Soviet Russia: the Rose of the World movement.

== Translations ==
- Andreev, Daniel. Rose of the World in English. Translated by Daniel H. Shubin. ISBN 978-0966275797.
