= Mikhail Yupp =

Russian poet and academic (born 1938)

Mikhail Yevsevyevich Yupp (Михаил Евсевиевич Юпп, born July 5, 1938, Leningrad) is a Russian poet and academic. He lives in Philadelphia.

Some of his books are illustrated by Mikhail Shemyakin.

== Awards ==
Yupp was awarded by Pushkin medal and a diplom of "Russian America" newspaper as "The best poet of 2005".
