= Leonid Andreyev =

Russian playwright and writer (1871–1919)

- Леонид Николаевич Андреев
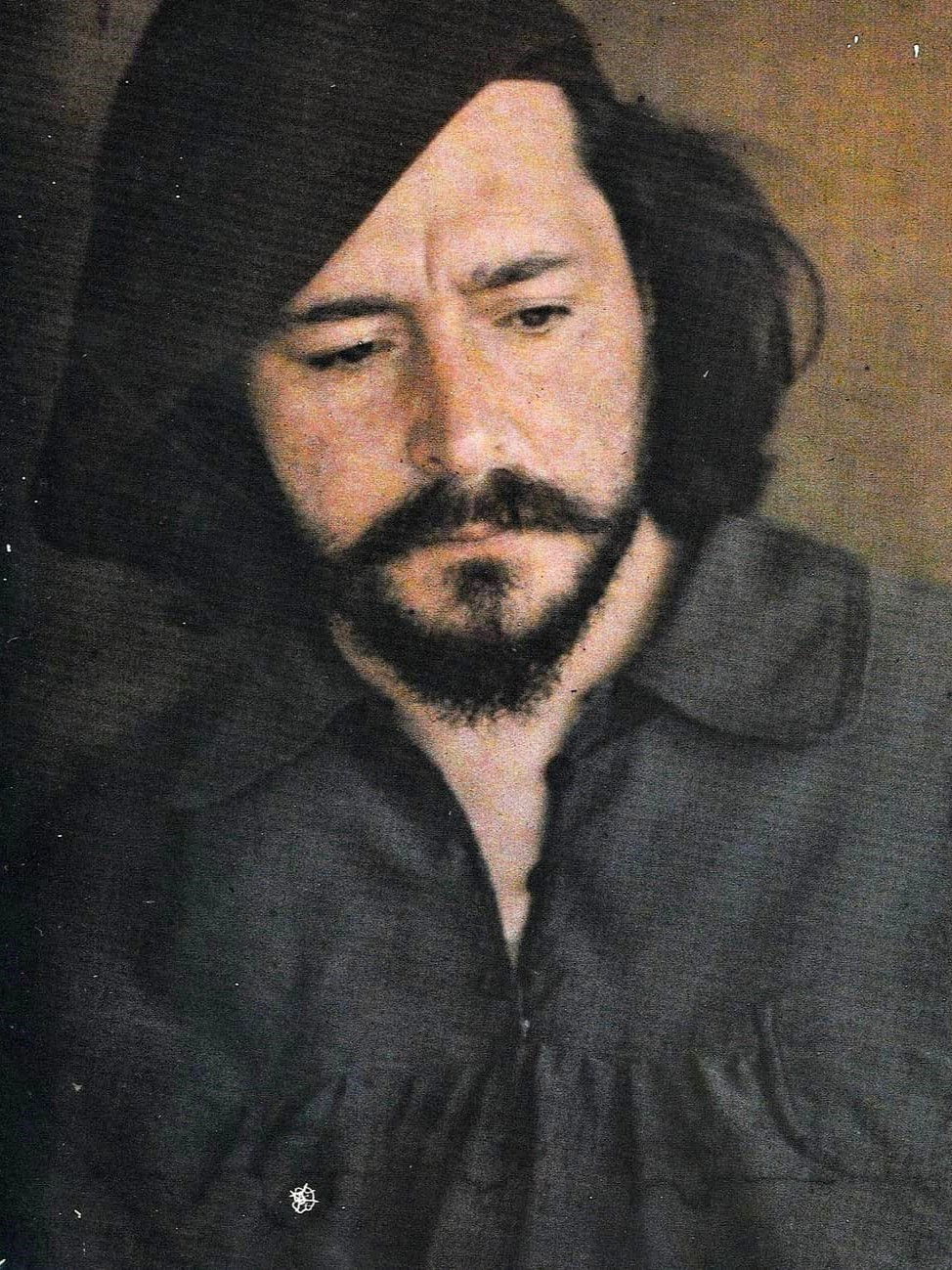
- Autochrome self-portrait, published in 1912
- Born: 21 August 1871; Oryol, Oryol Governorate, Russian Empire
- Died: 12 September 1919 (aged 48); Mustamäki, Finland
- Resting place: Literatorskiye Mostki, Saint Petersburg
- Education: Imperial Moscow University (1897)
- Children: 2, including Daniil
- Writing career
- Period: 1890s–1910s
- Genres: Fiction, Drama
- Notable works: The Seven Who Were Hanged, The Life of Man, He Who Gets Slapped
- Movements: Realism; naturalism; symbolism; expressionism

Leonid Nikolaievich Andreyev (Russian: Леони́д Никола́евич Андре́ев, 21 August [O.S. 9 August] 1871 – 12 September 1919) was a Russian playwright, novelist and short-story writer, who is considered to be a father of expressionism in Russian literature. He is regarded as one of the most talented and prolific representatives of the Silver Age literary period. Andreyev's style combines the elements of realist, naturalist, and symbolist schools in literature. Of his 25 plays, his 1915 play He Who Gets Slapped is regarded as his finest achievement.

== Biography ==
Born in Oryol, Russia, to a middle-class family, Andreyev originally studied law in Moscow and in Saint Petersburg. His mother hailed from an old Polish aristocratic, though impoverished, family, while she also claimed Ukrainian and Finnish ancestry. He became a police-court reporter for a Moscow daily, performing the routine of his humble calling without attracting any particular attention. At this time he wrote poetry and made a few efforts to publish it, but most publishers rejected his work. In 1898 the newspaper Kuryer newspaper in Moscow published his first short story, "Bargamot i Garaska". This story came to the attention of Maxim Gorky, who recommended that Andreyev concentrate on his literary work. Andreyev eventually gave up his law practice, fast becoming a literary celebrity, and the two writers remained friends for many years to come. Through Gorky, Andreyev became a member of the Moscow Sreda literary group, and published many of his works in Gorky's Znanie collections.

Andreyev's first collection of short stories and short novels (povesti) appeared in 1901, quickly selling a quarter-million copies and making him a literary star in Russia. In 1901 he published "Stena" (The Wall), and in 1902, "Bezdna" (The Abyss) and "V tumane" (In the Fog). The last two stories caused great commotion because of their candid and audacious treatment of sex. From 1898 to 1905 Andreyev published numerous short stories on many subjects, including life in Russian provincial settings, court and prison incidents (where he drew on material from his professional activity), and medical settings. His particular interest in psychology and psychiatry gave him an opportunity to explore insights into the human psyche and to depict memorable personalities who later became classic characters of Russian literature, such as in the 1902 short story "Mysl" (Thought).

During the time of the first Russian revolution (1905) Andreyev participated actively in social and political debate as a defender of democratic ideals. Several of his stories, including "The Red Laugh" ("Krasny smekh", 1904), Governor (Gubernator, 1905) and The Seven Who Were Hanged (Rasskaz o semi poveshennykh, 1908), captured the spirit of this period. Starting from 1905 he also produced many theatre dramas, including The Life of Man (1906), Tsar Hunger (1907), Black Masks (1908), Anathema (1909), and The Days of Our Life (1909). The Life of Man was staged by both Konstantin Stanislavsky (with his Moscow Art Theatre) and Vsevolod Meyerhold (in Saint Petersburg), two leading lights of Russian theatre of the twentieth century, in 1907.

Andreyev's works of the post-1905 revolution period are often interpreted to represent the evocation of absolute pessimism and a despairing mood. By the beginning of the second decade of the century his fame began to wane as new literary powers such as the Futurists rapidly came to prominence.

Andreyev completed his most well-known work, the play He Who Gets Slapped, in August 1915, just two months before its world premiere at the Moscow Art Theatre on 27 October 1915. A critically successful Broadway production, using an English language translation of the original Russian by Gregory Zilboorg, was staged in 1922. The work has been adapted into several films, a novel, an opera, and a musical, and is his most-performed play internationally.

Aside from his political writings, Andreyev published little after 1915. In 1916 he became the editor of the literary section of the newspaper Russian Will. He later supported the February Revolution of 1917, but saw the Bolsheviks' coming to power as catastrophic. In 1917 he moved to Finland. From his house in Finland he addressed manifestos to the world at large against the excesses of the Bolsheviks. An idealist and a rebel, Andreyev spent his last years in bitter poverty, and his premature death from heart failure may have been hastened by his anguish over the results of the Bolshevik Revolution of November 1917. He finished his last novel, Satan's Diary, a few days before his death.

A play, The Sorrows of Belgium, was written at the beginning of the War to celebrate the heroism of the Belgians against the invading German army. It was produced in the United States, as were the plays The Life of Man (1917), The Rape of the Sabine Women (1922), He Who Gets Slapped (1922), and Anathema (1923). A popular and acclaimed film version of He Who Gets Slapped was produced by MGM Studios in 1924. Some of his works were translated into English by Thomas Seltzer.

Poor Murderer, an adaptation of his short story Thought made by Pavel Kohout, opened on Broadway in 1976.

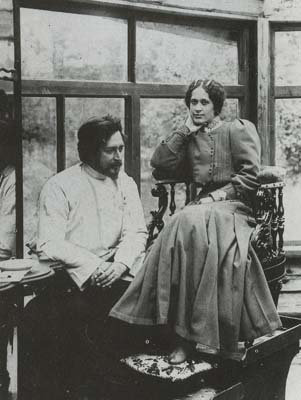
Leonid Andreyev and his second wife, Anna

He was married to Alexandra Veligorskaia, a niece of Taras Shevchenko. She died of puerperal fever in 1906. They had two sons, Daniil Andreyev, a poet and mystic, author of Roza Mira, and Vadim Andreyev. In 1908 Leonid Andreyev married Anna Denisevich, and decided to separate his two little boys, keeping the elder son, Vadim, with him and sending Daniil to live with Aleksandra's sister. Vadim Andreyev became a poet. He lived in Paris.

== Influence and legacy ==
During the 1914–1929 period, America was avid for anything relating to Edgar Allan Poe and, as Poe's Russian equivalent, translations of Andreyev's work found a ready audience in the English-speaking world. His work was extensively translated in book form, for instance as The Crushed Flower, and other stories (1916); The Little Angel, and other stories (1916); When The King Loses His Head, and other stories (1920). Translation of his stories were also published in the Weird Tales magazine during the 1920s, such as "Lazarus" in the March 1927 edition.

Often referred to as a "Russian Edgar Allan Poe", Andreyev had an influence through translations on two famous American horror writers, H. P. Lovecraft and Robert E. Howard. Copies of his The Seven Who Were Hanged and The Red Laugh were found in Lovecraft's library at his death. Howard rated Andreyev as one of the seven "most powerful" writers of all time.

Leonid Andreyev's granddaughter, daughter of Vadim Andreyev, the American writer and poet Olga Andreyeva Carlisle, published a collection of his short stories, Visions, in 1987.

== Sources ==
- Banham, Martin, ed. (1998). The Cambridge Guide to Theatre. Cambridge University Press. ISBN 0-521-43437-8.
- Benedetti, Jean (1999) [Original ed. published 1988]. Stanislavski: His Life and Art. London: Methuen. ISBN 0-413-52520-1.
- Carnicke, Sharon M. (2000). "Stanislavsky's System: Pathways for the Actor". In Hodge, Alison (ed.). Twentieth Century Actor Training. London and New York: Routledge. pp. 11–36. ISBN 0-415-19452-0.
- "Leonid Andreyev". Encyclopædia Britannica (Online ed.). Chicago: Encyclopædia Britannica, Inc. ISSN 1085-9721. OCLC 33663660.
- Imperial Moscow University: 1755-1917: encyclopedic dictionary. Moscow: Russian political encyclopedia (ROSSPEN). 2010. pp. 25–26. ISBN 978-5-8243-1429-8 – via A. Andreev, D. Tsygankov.
