= Quay with Sphinxes =

Structure in Saint Petersburg, Russia

Coordinates: 59.9370°N 30.2908°E

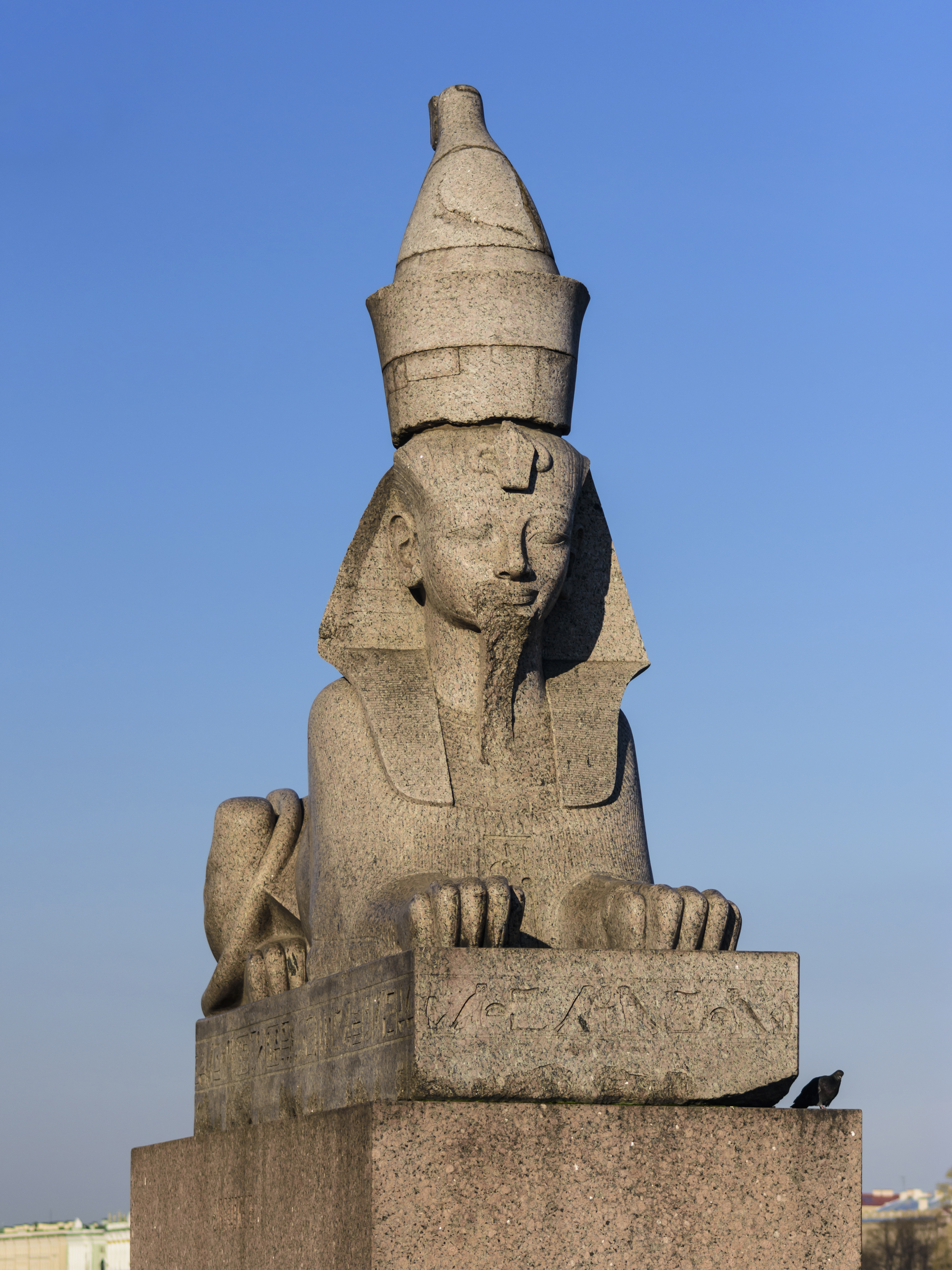
One of sphinxes

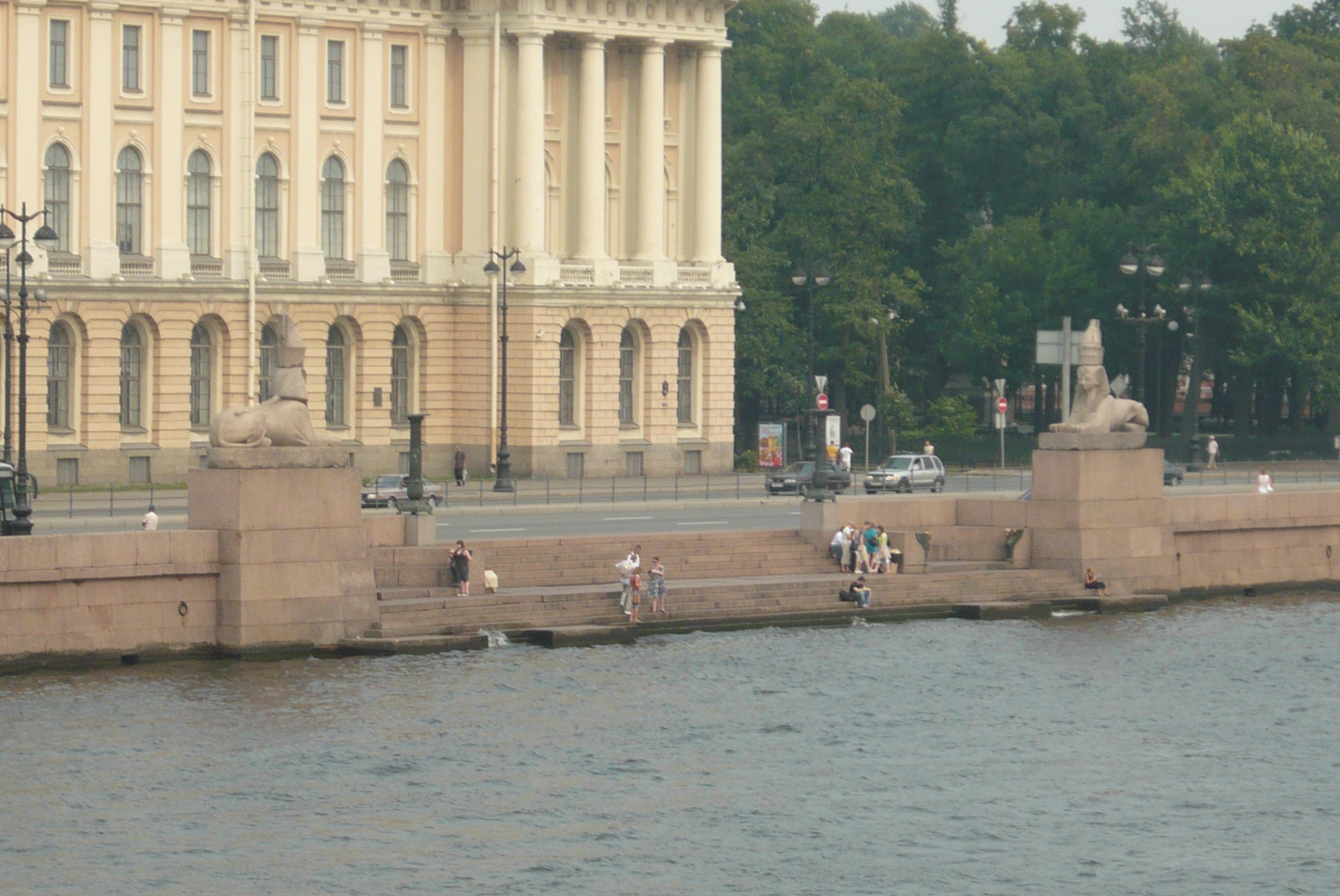
Modern view of the Quay

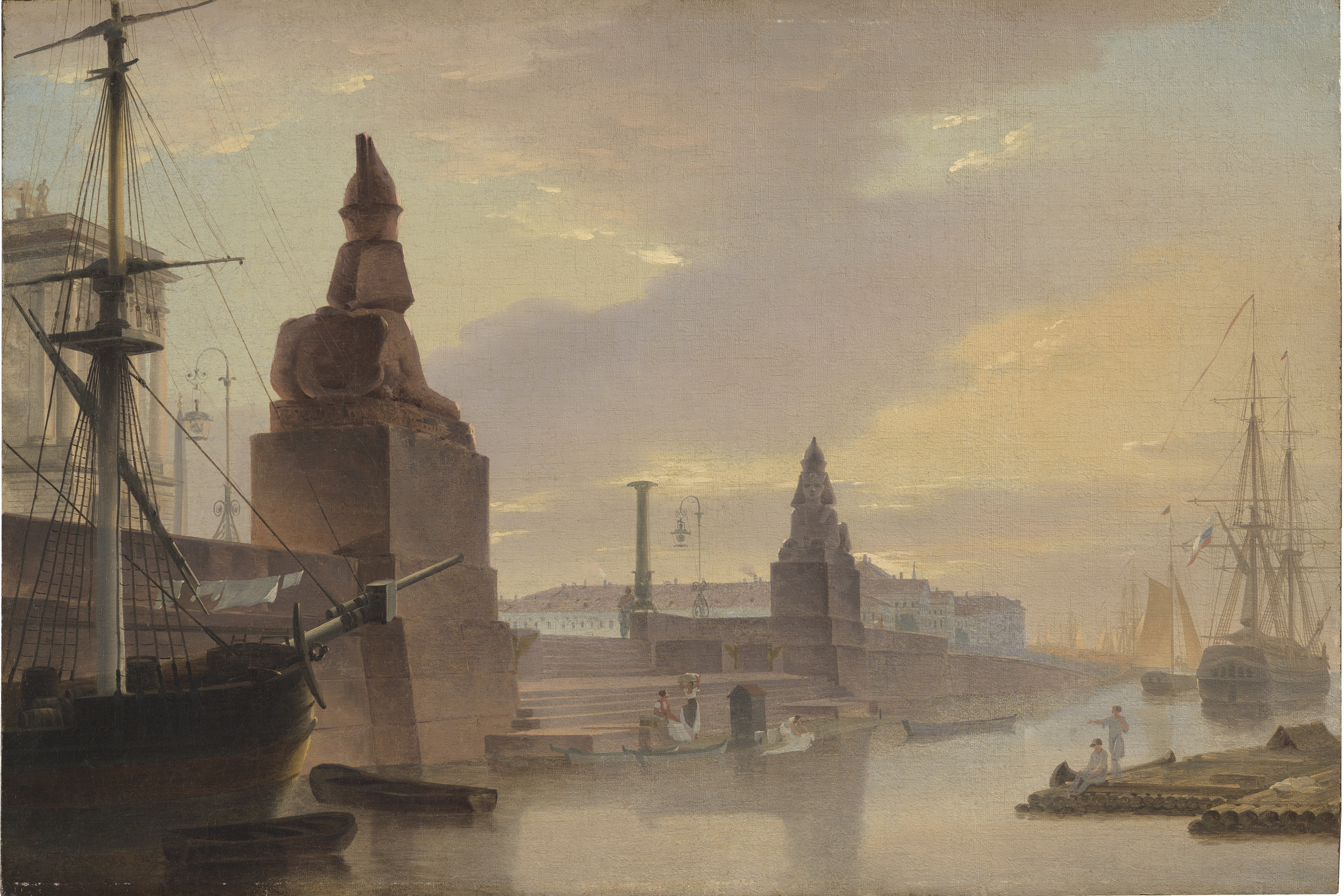
Sphinxes lining a quay in front of St Petersburg Academy of Arts by Maxim Vorobiev (1835)

Quay with Sphinxes (Sphinxes at the Universitetskaya Embankment) is a quay at the Universitetskaya Embankment in Saint Petersburg, in front of the Imperial Academy of Arts. It is remarkable for the two ancient sphinxes that were brought from Egypt to Russia at the height of Egyptomania in 1832. The quay was completed in 1834.

== History ==
The acquisition of sphinxes at the University embankment in front of the Academy of Arts in St. Petersburg is credited to Andrei Muravyov, who in 1830 was going on a pilgrimage to holy places. In Alexandria he saw the sphinxes, which were brought for sale. The ancient sculptures impressed so much that he immediately sent a letter to the Russian Ambassador, in which he proposed to acquire them. From the Embassy the letter was directed to St. Petersburg. There its receiver, Nicholas I, redirected the message to the Russian Academy of Arts. In the end, such a purchase was deemed expedient, but by the time these bureaucratic complications were resolved, the owner had already sold the sphinxes to France. Only because of the French Revolution they at last arrived in Saint Petersburg in 1832.

The first two years they spent in the courtyard of the Russian Academy of Arts. This time was spent on the creation of a pier made of syenite at the embankment nearby, which was designed by the architect Konstantin Thon. The sphinxes took their places on the waterfront in 1834.

== Description ==
The Saint Petersburg Sphinxes are about 3500 years old. They are made from Aswan granite and initially were in front of a magnificent temple, which was built in Egypt near Thebes (Luxor) for the 18th dynasty pharaoh Amenhotep III. Their faces are portraits of Amenhotep III and the shape of their headwear (crowns "pa shemti") indicate that he was the ruler of two kingdoms—the Upper Egypt and Lower Egypt. The sphinxes weigh about 23 tons each.

== See also ==
- Universitetskaya Embankment
- Egyptian Bridge
