= Musée imaginaire =

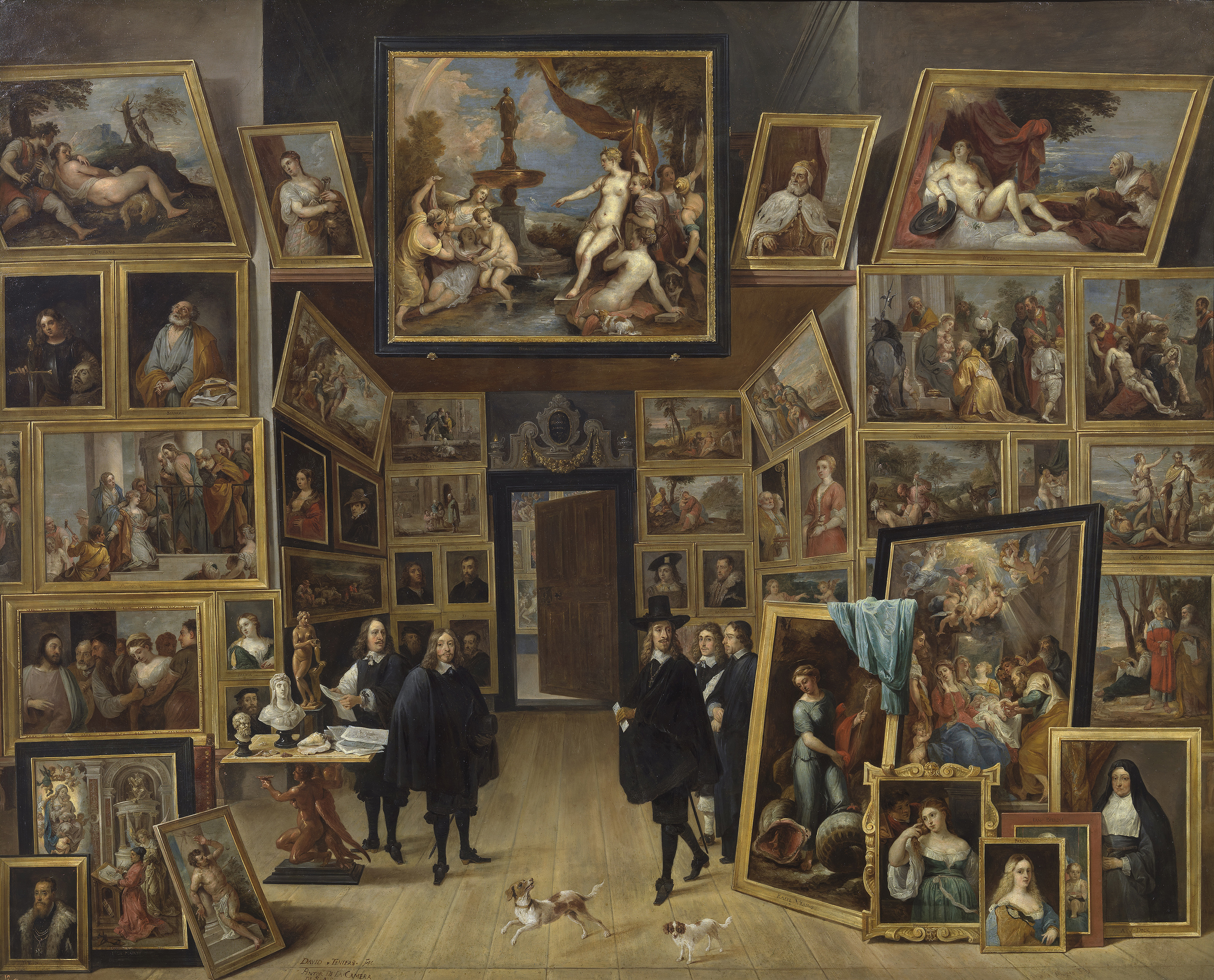
Téniers, L'Archiduc Léopold-Guillaume dans sa galerie de peintures, c. 1647, Madrid, Prado Museum. This is one of the photographs Malraux uses to illustrate his point.

A musée imaginaire or imaginary museum is a collection of works of art that a person holds as essential or favourite, so that given the opportunity he or she would bring them together in a single ideal museum.

The term is closely associated with André Malraux's Musée imaginaire, an essay from 1947 in which the principle it refers to is dramatised. Malraux organized an actual imaginary museum exhibition at the Fondation Maeght in 1973. To his own admission, "'Une expérience' seulement… et forcément décevante, puisque par définition le musée imaginaire, rassemblant les œuvres d'Art de toutes les civilisations et les âges de l'humanité, est imaginaire, insaisissable et ne peut avoir d'existence que dans nos mémoires." (transl. Only 'an experience'... and inevitably disappointing, since the definition of an imaginary museum - which gathers works of art of all civilizations and all Ages of Humanity - is imaginary, unseizable, and able to exist only in our imagination.) Despite that, he believed that the "birth" of the imaginary museum and the one of contemporary art were intertwined phenomenon.

Other personalities have since made their own selection known, such as Michel Butor in Le Musée imaginaire de Michel Butor, published in 2015 and republished in 2019.

More recently, Nicolas Malevé has compared the scale of Malraux's Musée imaginaire to that of datasets for training computer vision, such as ImageNet. As Douglas Crimp noted, Malraux's Musée imaginaire depends upon the existence of photographs. In Malevé's words, Crimp argued that "art history cannot produce a universal plane of comparison without another organising device: photography“.

== See also ==
- Musée Imaginaire of Mihail Chemiakin

== Bibliography ==
- Malraux, André (1996). Le musée imaginaire. Paris: Gallimard. ISBN 9782070329489. OCLC 1126353728.
