= Birth–Giver of God's Walk Through Torment =

Slavic Biblical apocrypha

The Mother of God's Walk Through Torment
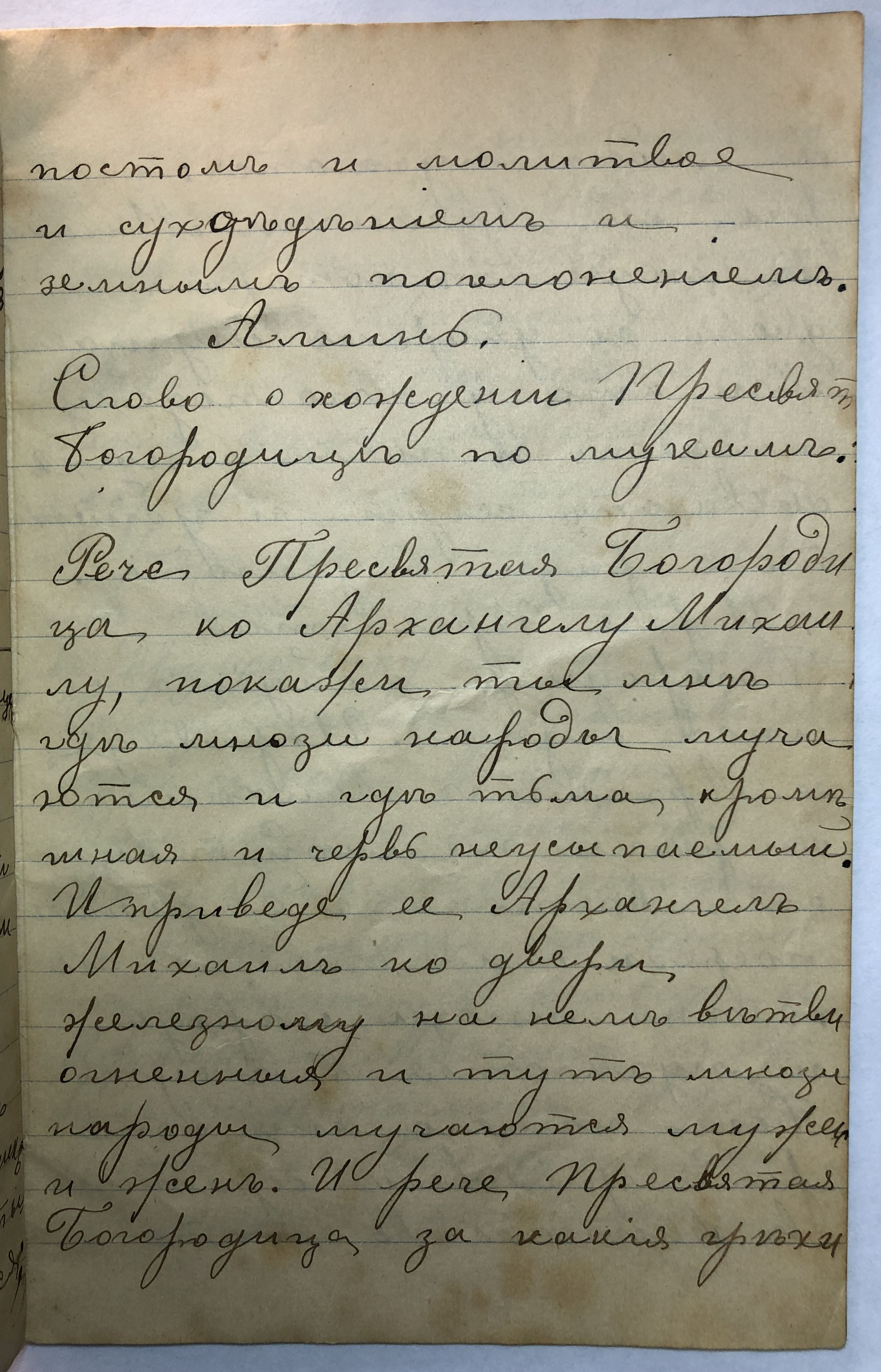
- The Word about the Walk of the Most Holy Mother of God Through Torment (Manuscript, Late 19th Century, Collection of Viktor Smirnov)
- Language: Old Russian language Old Slavonic language

The Mother of God's Walk Through Torment is a fairly popular apocrypha in Slavic literature, which is a translation and partly a reworking of the Greek "Revelation of the Most Holy Theotokos". The text describes the torments of sinners in hell. It was especially popular among the Old Believers.

The oldest copy of the "Walk", dating back to the 12th century, was published by Izmail Sreznevskiy, parallel to the Greek text, in "Ancient Monument of Language and Writing" (1863).

== Content ==
The apocrypha describes the torment of sinners in hell. After praying on the Mount Eleon, the Mother of God, accompanied by Archangel Michael, passes through the places where sinners are tormented. In the first place, pagans who worshiped Troyan, Veles and Perun were tormented. There was darkness elsewhere. In the third, there is a river of fire, where those who were cursed by their parents, ate human flesh, or bore false witness were executed. Then the Mother of God saw the moneylender, who was hanging upside down and being devoured by worms. Next came the gossip girl, hanging by her teeth. In the north of hell, sinners who were late for Sunday Services or did not greet the priests were tormented on hot benches and fiery tables. Also described in hell is an iron tree on which slanderers were hung by their tongues. A special place among sinners is occupied by negligent church ministers, patriarchs and bishops who were not worthy of their rank, as well as priests' wives who remarried. A lake of fire was prepared for the wicked Christians.

Struck by the torments, the Mother of God turns to the Lord with a prayer to ease the fate of sinners: "Lord, I do not ask for the unfaithful Zhids, but I ask for your mercy for Christians". Her prayer is supported by prophets, apostles and evangelists. The Lord, through the prayers of the Mother, gives relief to sinners, which consists in the fact that their torment ceases for a time "from Great Thursday to Trinity's Day" – only for Christians; Christ agrees to have complete mercy on them only if the Mother of God again sees Him crucified on the cross.

== Influences ==
The "Walk" was influenced by the "Life of Saint Basil the New", the "Word" of Palladius the Monk (368–430) and other works.

The "Walk" influenced folk poetry, particularly the creation of spiritual verses. This influence is especially noticeable in the verse "About the Present Age and the Future", where many sayings from the "Walk" are repeated.

Some of the motifs from the Mother of God's Walk Through Torment were used in the works of Fyodor Dostoevskiy, in particular, when writing the chapter "The Grand Inquisitor" in the novel The Brothers Karamazov.

== Editions ==
- Izmail Sreznevskiy. Ancient Monuments of Russian Writing and Language (10th–14th Centuries): General Periodical Review – Sankt–Peterburg, 1863 – Pages 204–217
- Nikolay Tikhonravov. Monuments of the Renounced Russian Literature – Moskva, 1863 – Volume 2 – Pages 23–39
- The Birth–Giver of God's Walk Through Torment / Preparation of the Text, Translation and Comments by Milena Rozhdestvenskaya // Monuments of Literature of Ancient Rus: 12th Century – Moskva, 1980 – Pages 166–183, 651–652
- Apocryphal Apocalypses. Edited by Mariya Vitkovskaya and Vadim Vitkovskiy. Series: Ancient Christianity – Sankt–Peterburg: Aleteya. 279 Pages. 2001. ISBN 5-89329-223-5. Pages 238–251
