= Daniil Andreyev =

Russian writer and mystic (1906–1959)

- Даниил Андреев
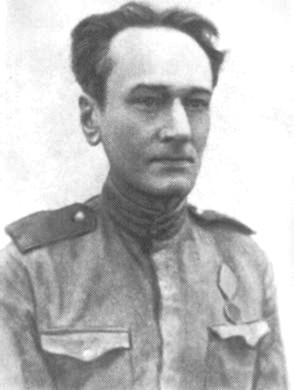
- Andreyev in 1943
- Born: 2 November 1906; Berlin, German Empire
- Died: 30 May 1959 (aged 52); Moscow, Russian SFSR, USSR
- Occupations: Writer; poet; mystic
- Parents: Leonid Andreyev (father); Alexandra Andreeva (mother)

Daniil Leonidovich Andreyev (Russian: Даниил Леонидович Андреев, IPA: [dənʲɪˈil lʲɪɐˈnʲidəvʲɪtɕ ɐnˈdrʲejɪf]; 2 November 1906 – 30 March 1959) was a Russian writer, poet, and Christian mystic.

== Biography ==
Daniil Andreyev, the son of Leonid Andreyev (a Russian writer of the start of the 20th century), had Maxim Gorky as his godfather. After the infant's mother, Aleksandra Mikhailovna (Veligorskaya) Andreyeva (a great-niece of Taras Shevchenko), died shortly after childbirth, Leonid Andreyev gave the infant Daniil to his late wife's sister, Elizabeth Mikhailovna Dobrova, to raise. This act had two important consequences: it meant that when Leonid Andreyev, like many other writers and intellectuals, left Russia (he emigrated to the newly independent Finland in December 1917 after the Bolshevik Revolution), his young son remained behind; it also meant that Daniil was raised in a household that remained deeply religious.

Like many of his contemporaries, the boy Daniil had a pronounced literary bent; he began writing poetry and prose in early childhood. He graduated from high school but could not attend university because of his "non-proletarian" background. Supporting himself as a graphic artist, he wrote in his spare time.

Daniil Andreyev was conscripted into the Red Army in 1942. He served as a non-combatant, and during the Siege of Leningrad of 1941-1944 helped to transport supplies across Lake Ladoga. After World War II Andreyev returned to civilian life, but the Soviet authorities arrested him in April 1947, charged him with anti-Soviet propaganda and preparations to assassinate Joseph Stalin, and sentenced him to 25 years of imprisonment. He suffered a heart attack in prison in 1954, the first manifestation of the heart condition that would eventually cause his death. In the same year his sentence was reduced to 10 years. He was released on 22 April 1957, already terminally ill. He was officially rehabilitated on 11 July 1957.

While incarcerated in Vladimir Central Prison from 1947 to 1957, Andreyev experienced mystic visions and started writing Roza Mira, finishing it after his release. The book became known in the Soviet Union via samizdat, but was first officially published only in 1991. In 1997 Lindisfarne Books published Jordan Roberts's English-language translation of Roza Mira in the United States. An English translation of Rose of the World was completed by Daniel H. Shubin in 2015.

== Works ==
Almost all works that Andreyev wrote before 1947, were destroyed by Ministry for State Security (MGB) as "anti-Soviet literature", including his novel Wanderers of Night (Russian: Странники ночи) about the spiritual opposition to the Soviet regime and atheism. Being imprisoned, however, Andreyev managed to restore some of his poems. He also tried to restore Wanderers of Night, but he could only restore a few pages of it. Also some works of his childhood were kept by his friend, including his first poems written at the age of 8.

His main book, Roza Mira (Russian: Роза Мира, literally "The Rose of the World") contains a detailed description of numerous layers of spiritual reality that surround Earth, of the forthcoming religion called Roza Mira that will emerge and unite all people and states, and of the events of the future advent of Antichrist and his fall.

Apart from Roza Mira, he wrote a poem The Iron Mystery (Russian: Железная мистерия, published in 1990), a "poetic ensemble" (that is what he called it) Russian gods (Russian: Русские боги, full text published in 1995) and other works.
