= Mihail Chemiakin =

Russian artist

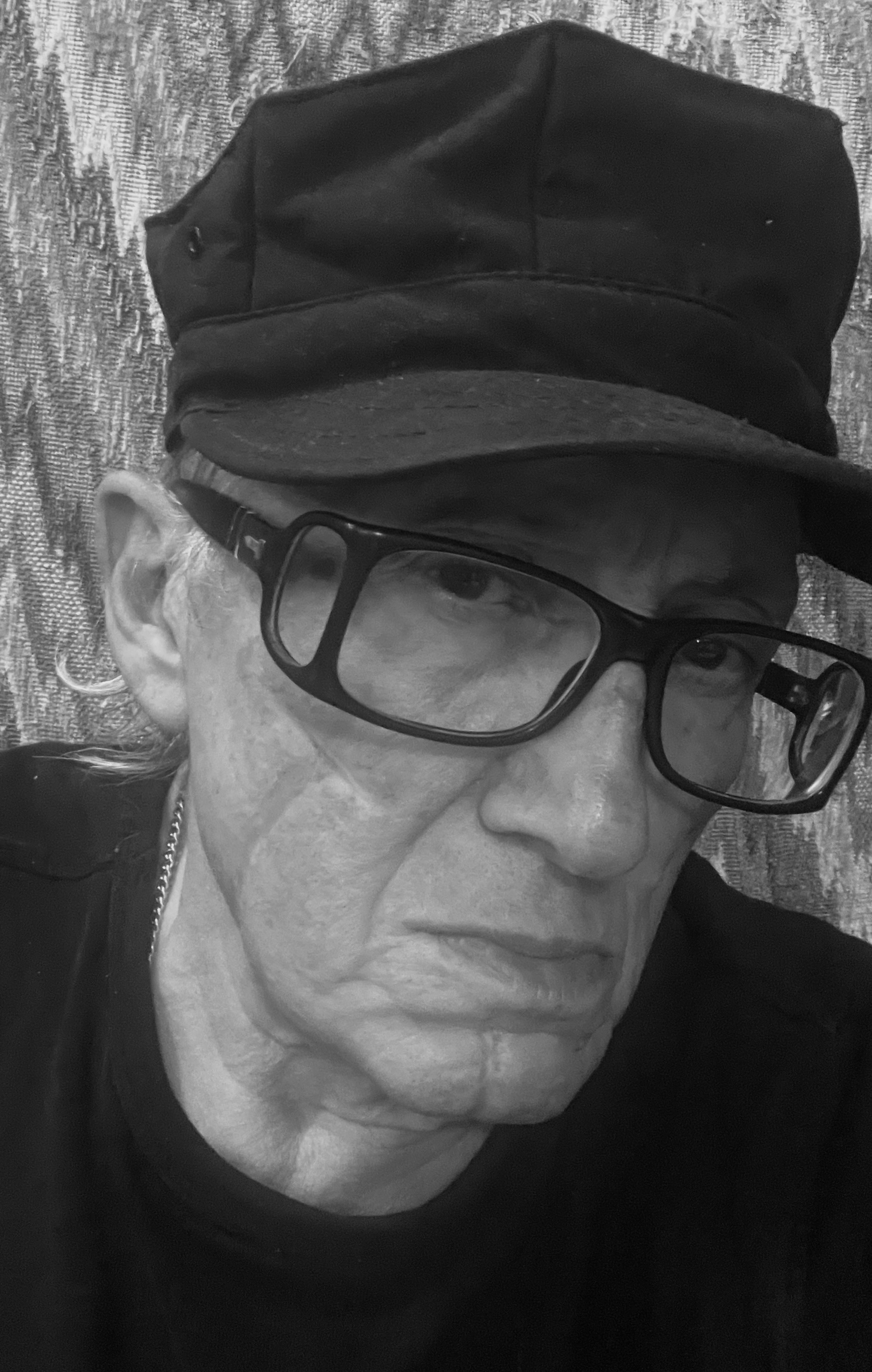
- Chemiakin in 2023
- Born: Mihail Chemiakin (Михаил М. Шемякин); 4 May 1943 (age 83); Moscow, Russian SFSR, Soviet Union
- Known for: Painting, Sculpture, Illustration, Musée imaginaire, Publishing, Scenic design, Stage design
- Notable work: Sculpture: Monument to Peter I, installed courtyard of Sts. Peter and Paul Fortress, St. Petersburg, 1991 Sculpture: Children - Victims of the Sins of Adults, installed Bolotnaya Square Moscow, 2001 Ballet: Chemiakin's staging of Tchaikovsky's "The Nutcracker" (set, costume, production design and creative concept), premiered Mariinsky Theatre, St. Petersburg, 12 February 2001 Mihail Chemiakin’s Musée Imaginaire: Research into the history of art from the point of view of the transformation of images, 1963 - date
- Awards: Order of Friendship, 2009 Ordre des Arts et des Lettres, 1994; State Prize of the Russian Federation,1993
- Website: https://mihfond.ru/

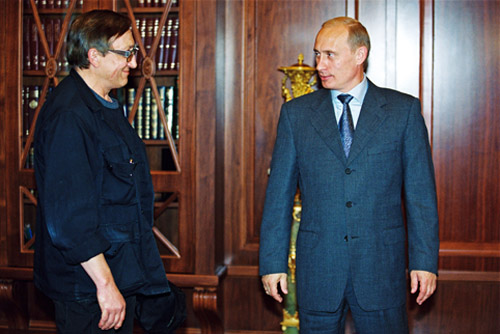
Mihail Chemiakin (left) with Russian president Vladimir Putin in 2001

Mihail Mikhailovich Chemiakin or Shemyakin (Russian: Михаил Михайлович Шемякин; born 4 May 1943) is a Russian-American painter, stage designer, sculptor and publisher, and a controversial representative of the nonconformist art tradition of St. Petersburg.

== Early life ==
Chemiakin was born to a military family. His father, a Kabardian from the Caucasus Mountains Mikhail Kardanov, had lost his parents and was adopted by a friend of his father's, White Army officer Piotr Chemiakin. The artist's father eventually became a Soviet Army officer. He received one of the first Orders of the Red Banner in 1921 at the age of thirteen. Chemiakin's mother was an actress and poet Yulia Nikolaevna Predtechenskaya of Russian noble heritage. She met her future husband in 1941 when he came to the Moscow circus to recruit volunteers to fight in World War II, and accompanied him to the front. She served in the cavalry under the command of Lev Dovator and took part in battles alongside her husband.

== Mihail Chemiakin's Musée Imaginaire ==
Mihail Chemiakin's Musee Imaginaire is a research project by Chemiakin, who considers the history of art from the point of view of the transformation of images. The basis of the research methodology is the interpretation and systematization of visual images. The studies are presented in the form of sheets with images pasted on them, grouped according to the principle of visual generality — thematic, stylistic, figurative, iconographic.

Chemiakin's project was partially inspired by an essay by André Malraux, who first formulated the concept of the Imaginary Museum. He proposed juxtaposing works of art from different cultures and eras to analyze the changing image or, as Malraux wrote, metamorphosis. In addition, he suggested that everyone should compose their own personal museum, selecting works without relying on the opinions and limited choices of major institutions. This was made possible by the mass proliferation of photography.

"Musée imaginaire" appears as an alternative to the classical museum in the evaluation of contemporary art, for which no clear aesthetic requirements have been defined.

Performance in Paris on the Quai Branly at the Salon du Livre russe in 2024.

== See also ==
- List of Russian artists

== Sources ==
- The Grove Dictionary of Art, by Jane Shoaf Turner (Ed.), Grove's Dictionaries. ISBN 1-884446-00-0
- Kolodzei Art Foundation
- Kolodzei Art Foundation and Kolodzei Collection of Russian and Eastern European Art
