= Dionysus, called Narcissus =

Bronze Roman statuette

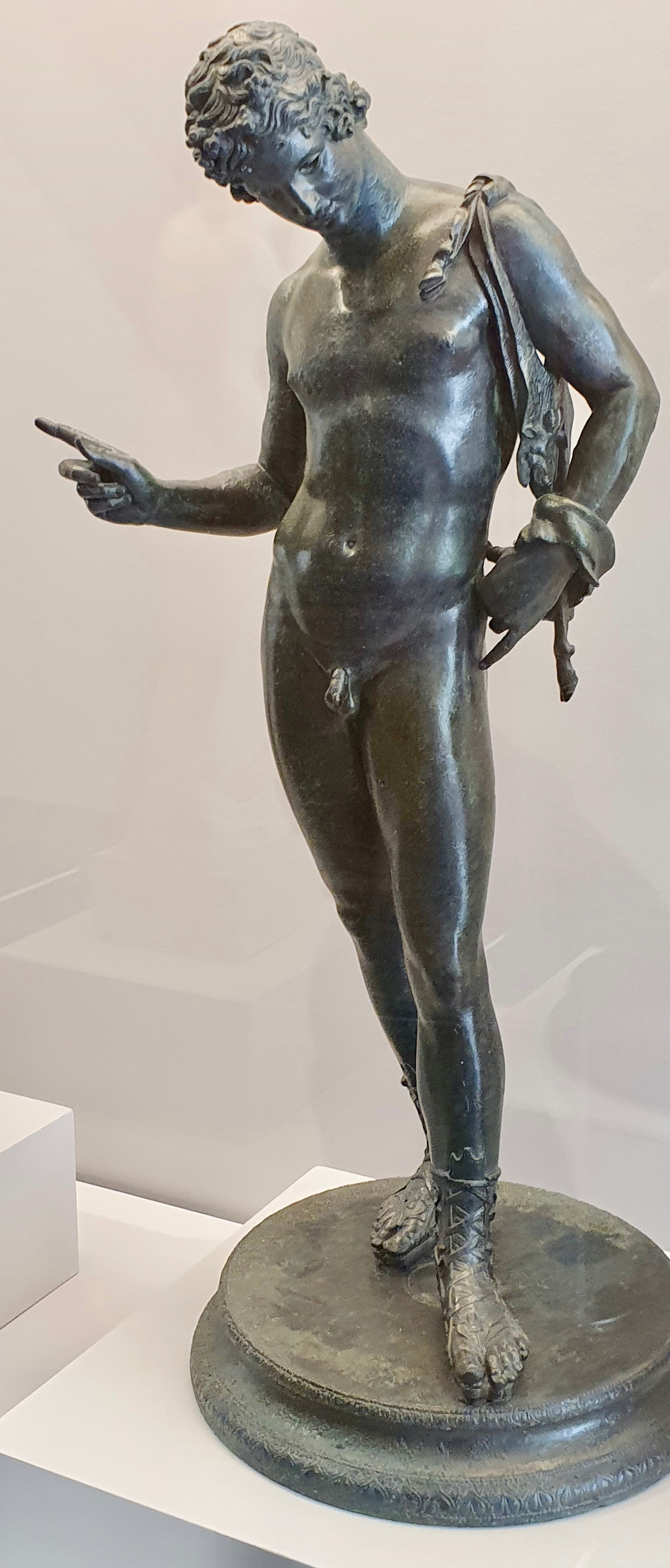
- Artist: School of Praxiteles
- Year: c. 1st century BC-1st century AD
- Medium: Bronze sculpture
- Dimensions: 63 cm (25 in)
- Location: Museo Archeologico Nazionale, Naples

Dionysus, called Narcissus (Italian: Dioniso, così detto Narciso) is a bronze ancient Roman statuette, created between the 1st century BC and the 1st century AD. It is believed to be a Roman copy of an ancient Greek original from the 4th century BC, created by an artist of the school of Praxiteles. Discovered in Pompeii in 1862, the statuette became one of the most popular finds to emerge from excavations in Pompeii and Herculaneum in the course of the nineteenth century.

== Discovery and identification ==
The work was discovered in 1862 in the house now known as the Casa di Narcisso or the House of the Statue of Narcissus. The Illustrated London News in 1864 reported that "the figure of Narcissus has been greatly admired for the grace of its proportions and the anatomical correctness of its forms, more especially evident in the back view."

It is now is in the Museo Archeologico Nazionale of Naples (Inv. 5003). It has been called the "pearl" of the museum’s collections and described as "the most splendid antique masterpiece extant...It surpasses in beauty all the other sculptures that come from Pompeii."

It depicts a slender ephebe gazing downward and standing in a contrapposto pose. He wears only an ivy crown with grapes on his head, a nebris (goat’s skin) tied with a knot on left shoulder, and sandals on his feet. It was initially identified as a statue of Narcissus, the mythical youth who fell in love with his own reflection in a pool (thus the downward gaze). But the grapes, ivy crown, and nebris are attributes of Dionysus/Bacchus, god of wine, and the statue is now generally identified as Dionysus.

Ilkka Kuivalainen in 2021 further suggested that "the male’s apparel and the position of the right-hand fingers identifies the bronze as Bacchus dangling a bunch of grapes above a panther. The iconographic formula is also known from wall paintings in Pompeii...the original base has been replaced and the panther is lost." Kuivalainen's thesis also accounts for the statue's downward gaze.

== Cultural diffusion ==
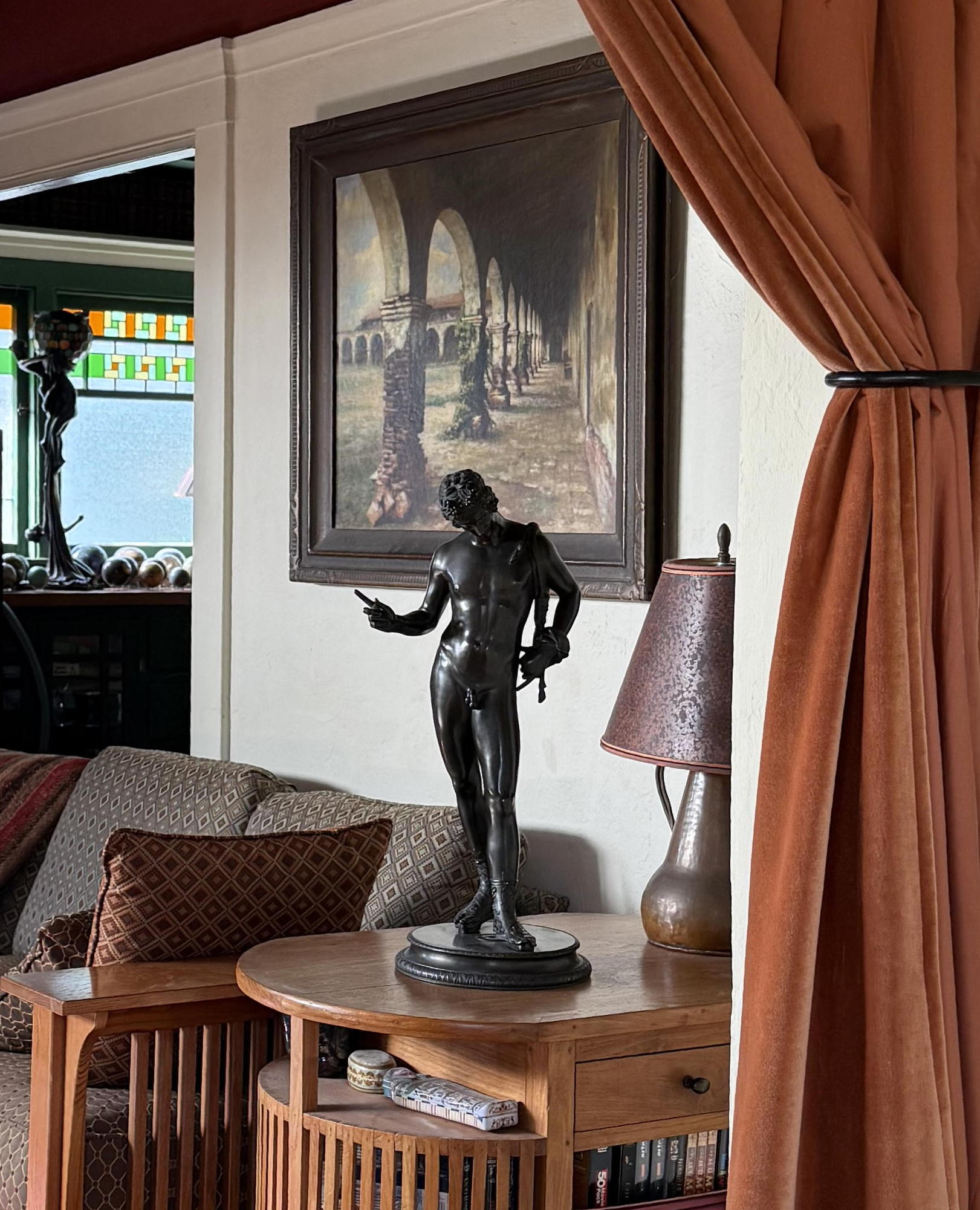
Copy from the Sommer foundry after the mold by Gemito, in a home in Berkeley, California. Photo by Steven Saylor.

The Dionysus was the last ancient statue discovered in Italy to enjoy great fame and also to become extensively copied. At the end of the 19th and beginning of the 20th centuries, copies in bronze became a standard product for the Neapolitan foundries that specialized in so-called Grand Tour reproductions from Pompei and Herculaneum, including De Angelis, the Fonderie Artistiche Riunite, the Chiurazzi foundry, and the foundry of Giorgio Sommer, who extensively photographed the original and used a mold created by Neapolitan sculptor Vincenzo Gemito in 1885. "Gemito spent longer making his copy of the Narcissus than he would generally do on his own original works: the sensitive artist fell in love with the sculpture’s composed and elegant purity...When placed beside the original, this wonderful copy could deceive even the greatest experts.")

Copies of the statuette were collected by notable members of the homosexual subculture, including Pyotr Ilyich Tchaikovsky and his brother Modest, whose copy can be seen at the Tchaikovsky State House-Museum; Oscar Wilde, who displayed a bronze copy on the mantelpiece at 34 Tite Street in Chelsea); Wilhelm von Gloeden, whose copy—sometimes with a broken arm—can be seen in a number of his photographs of male nudes; and Eduard von Mayer and Elisar von Kupffer, who each in 1930 sat for a photograph at Sanctuarium Artis Elisarion with a copy of the Dionysus in the background.

Since at least 1882, a copy of the Dionysus on a pedestal has been the focal point of the vestibule of Leighton House, the historic home and studio of the painter and aesthete Frederic, Lord Leighton in Holland Park, London.

The Dionysus inspired works of ekphrasis by both the Russian poet Vyacheslav Ivanov (1904) and the American playwright Tennessee Williams (1948). Williams' poem was later set to music by Paul Bowles.

== Gallery ==
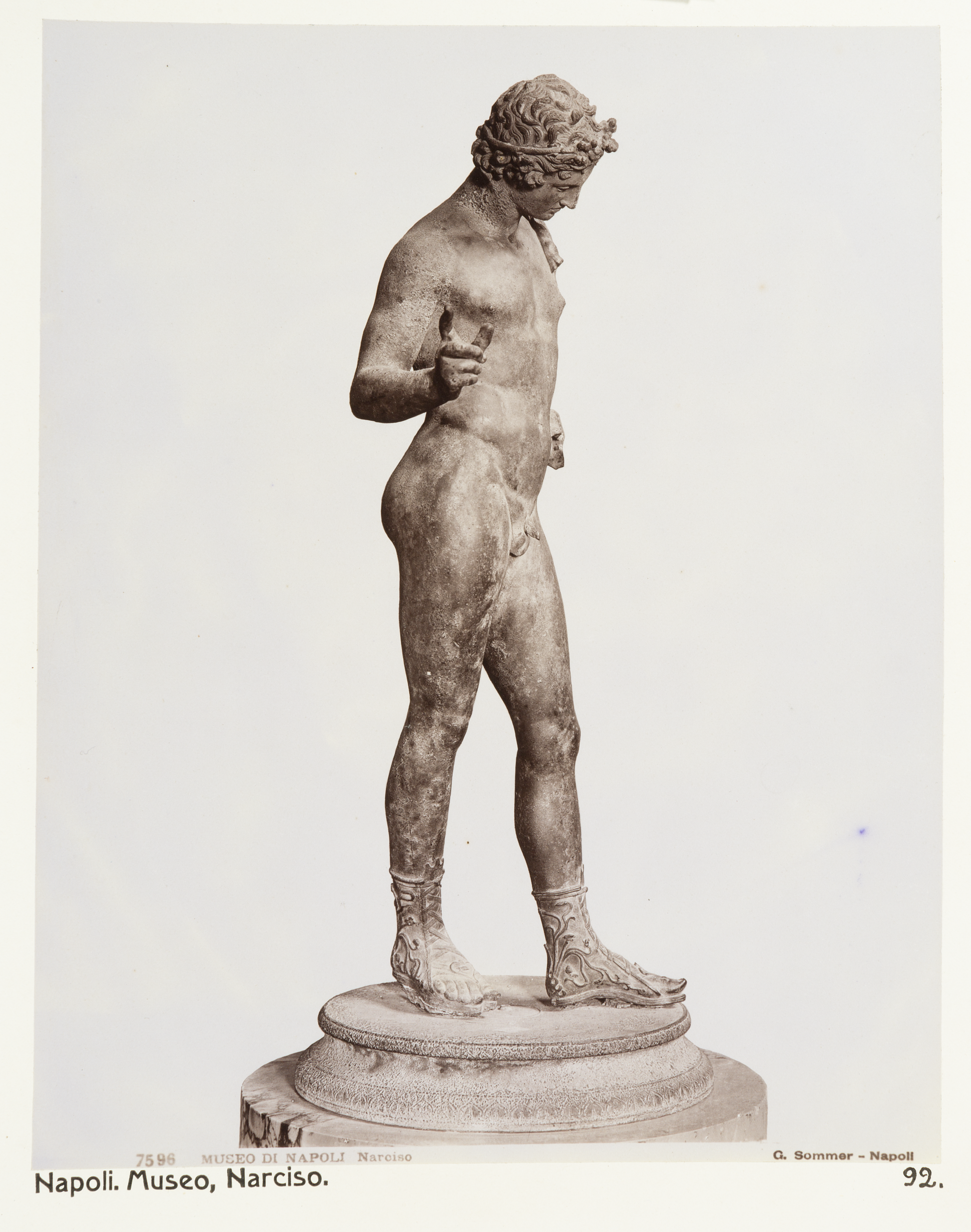
The original statuette photographed by Giorgio Sommer.

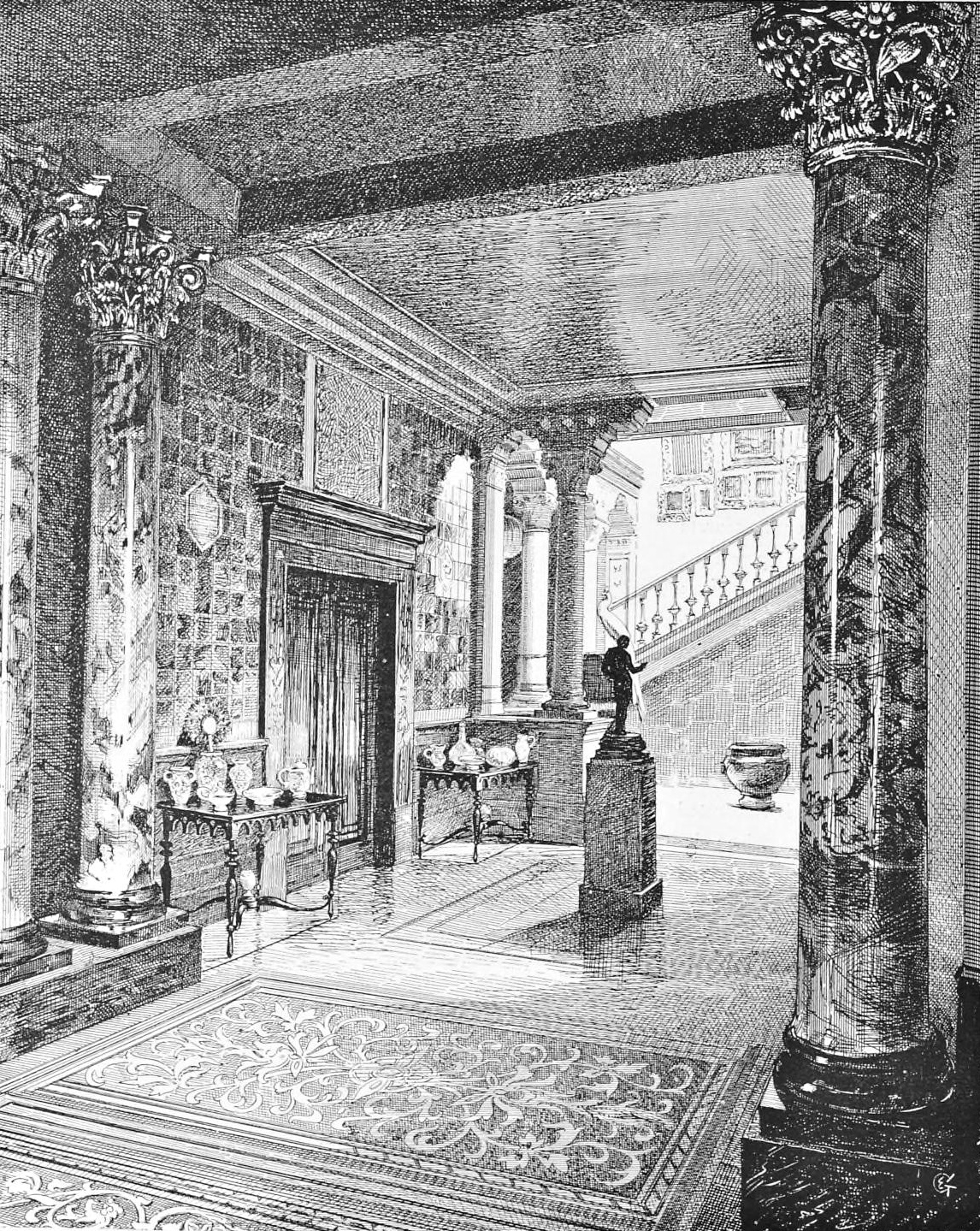
Vestibule of Leighton House, London, 1882.

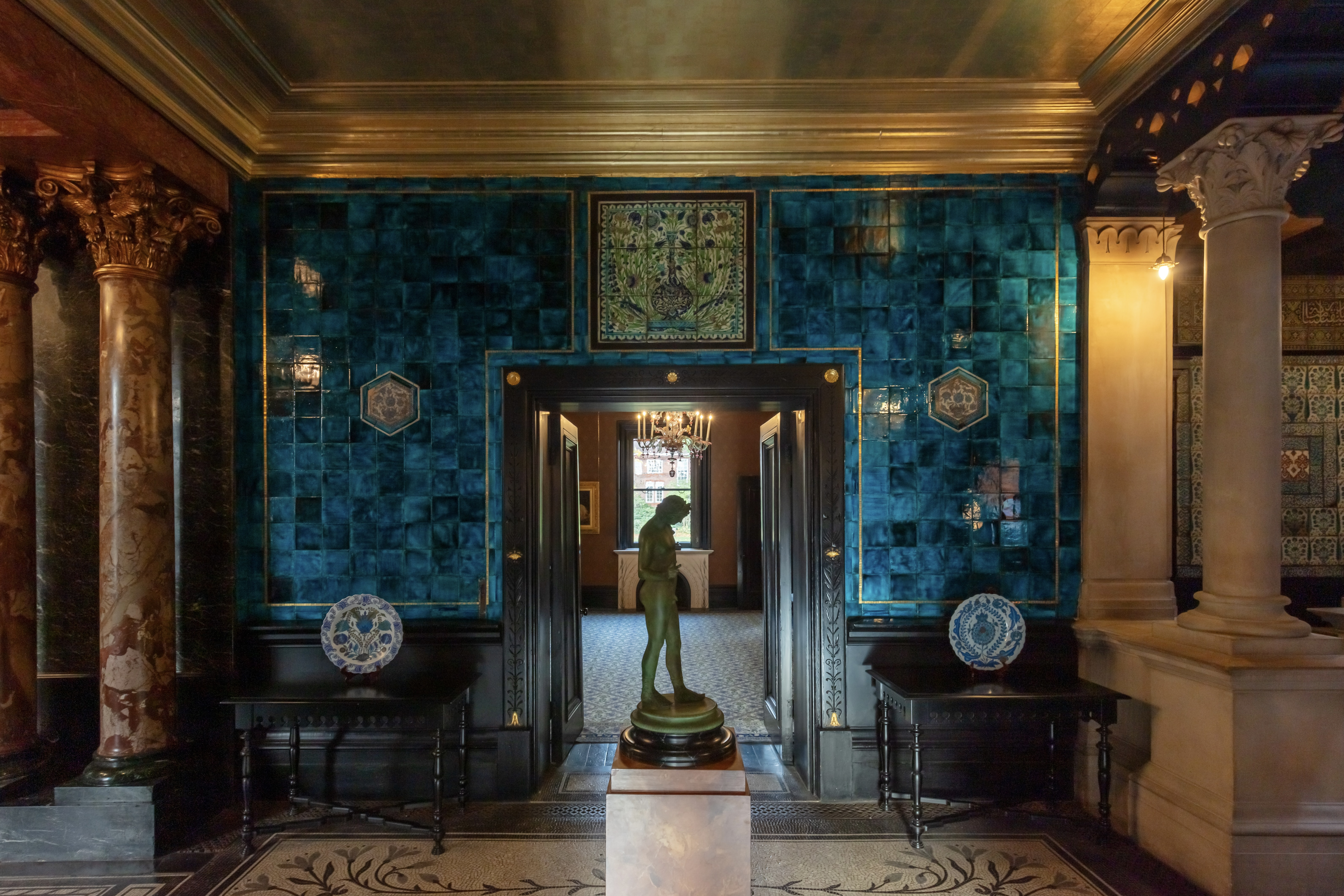
Vestibule of Leighton House, London. Photo by Diego Delso, 2022.

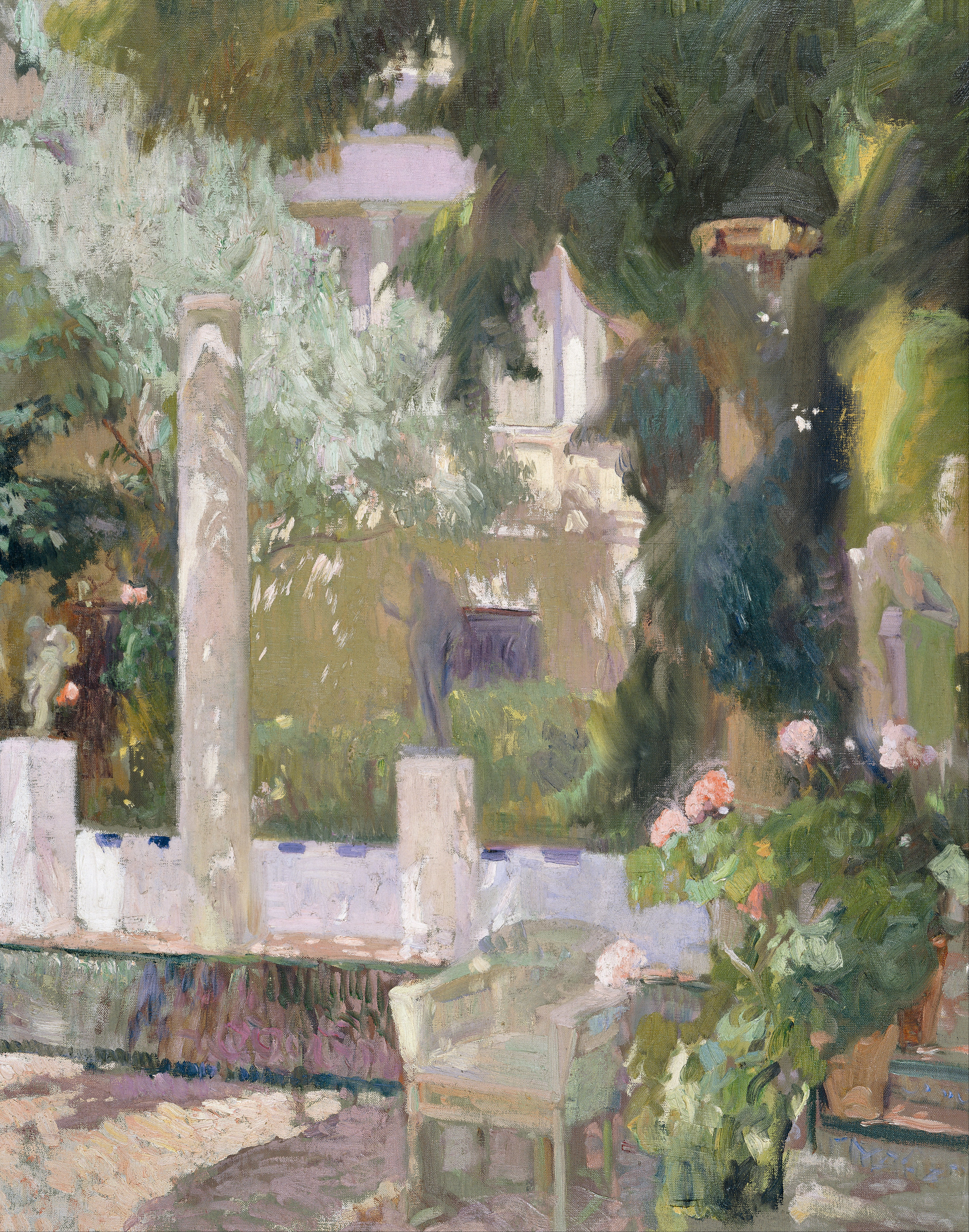
Joaquín Sorolla, Gardens at the Sorolla Family House, 1920, Museo Sorolla, Madrid.

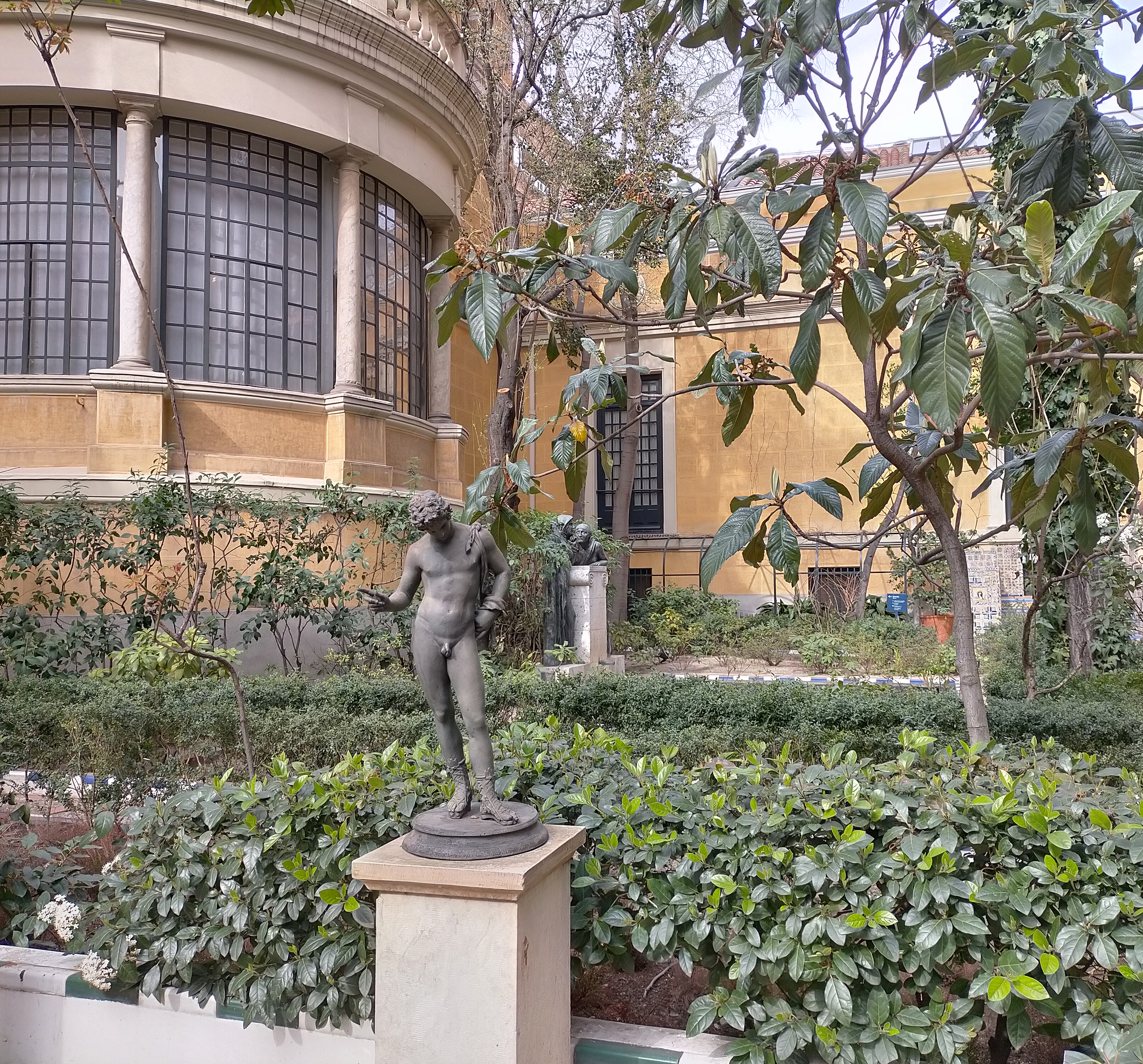
Museo Sorolla, Madrid.

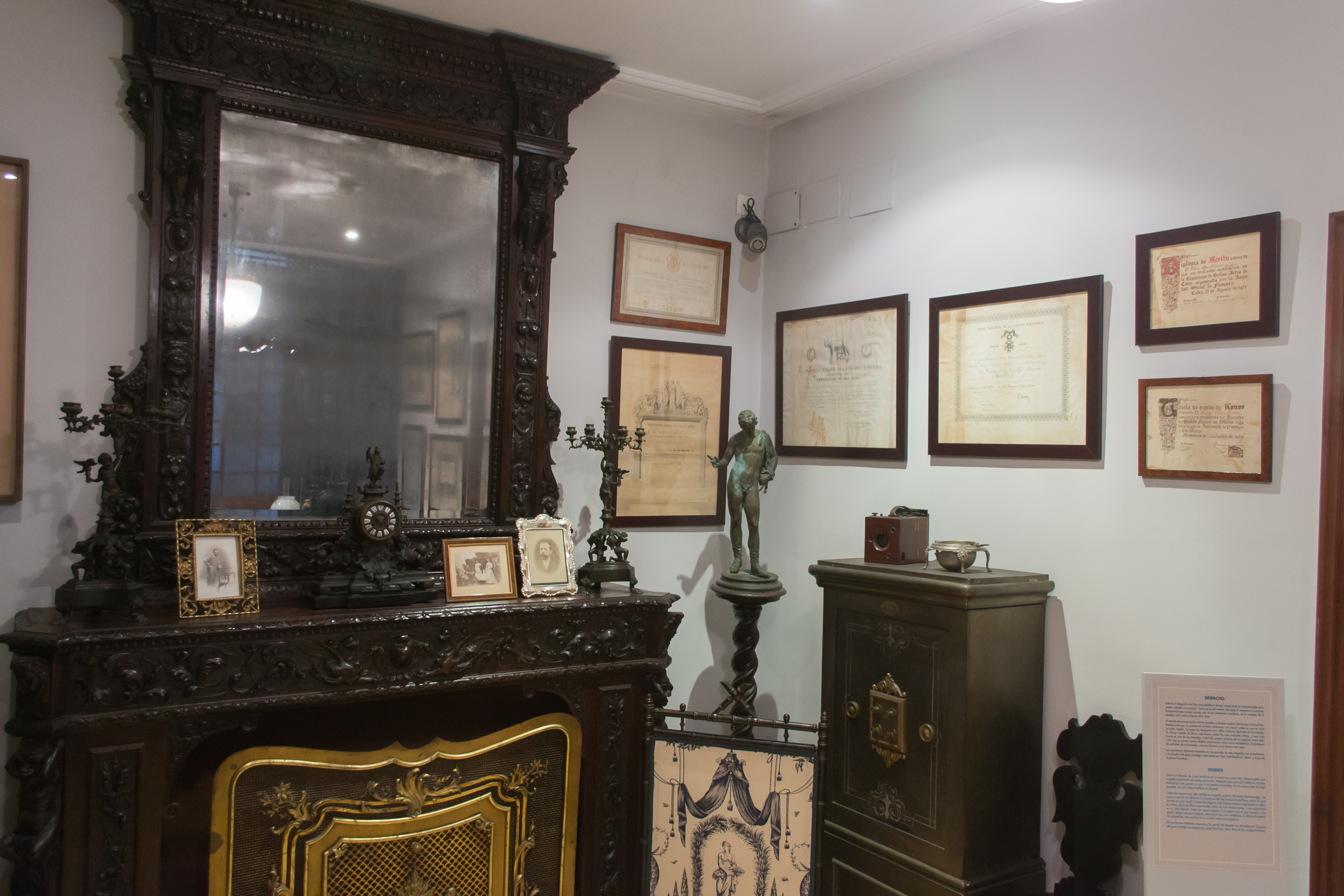
Casa-Museo Benlliure, Valencia.

Richard Bergh, Professor Karl Warburg, 1905, Gothenburg Museum of Art, Sweden.

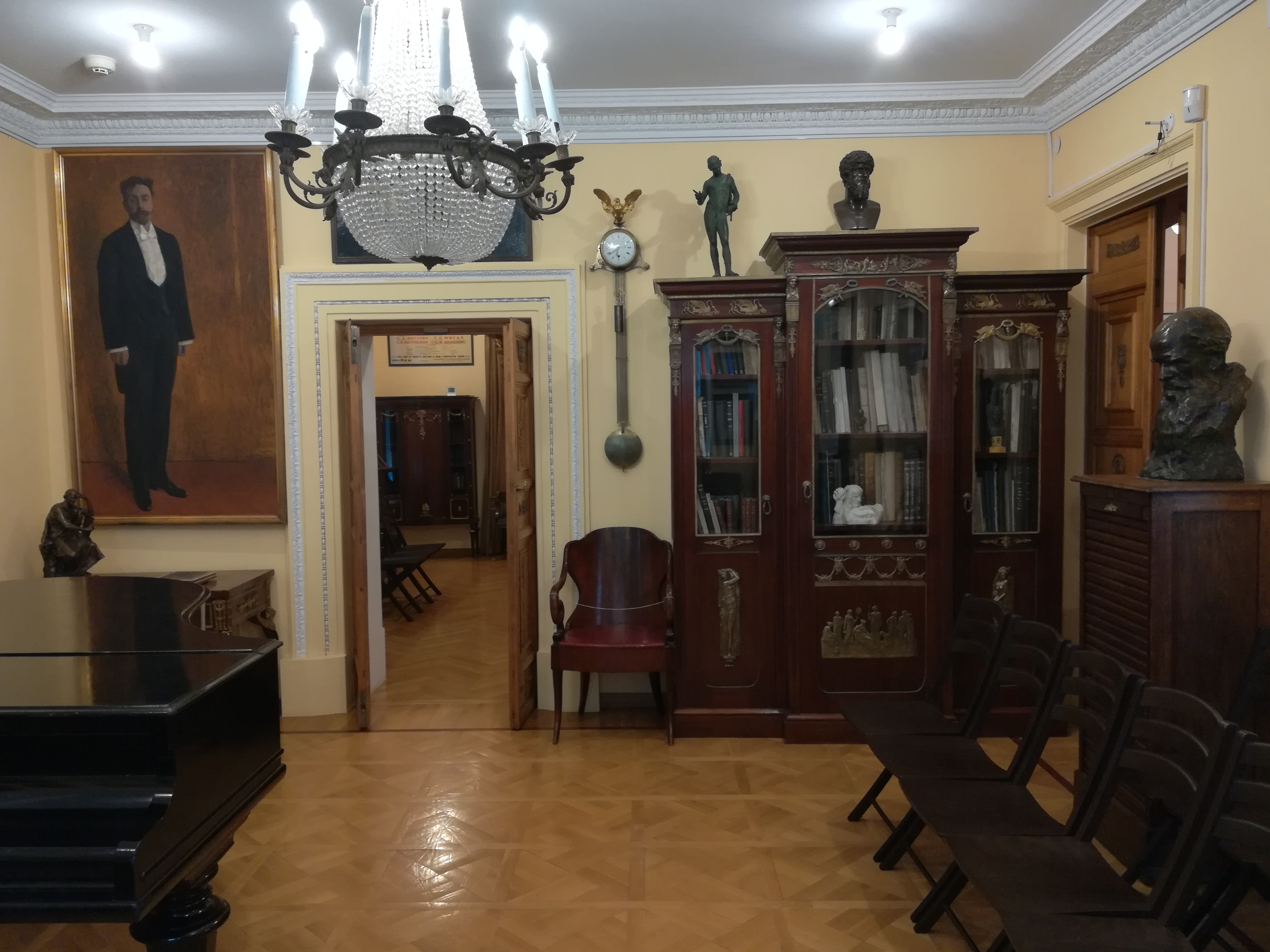
Apartment of Nikolai Golovanov, Moscow.

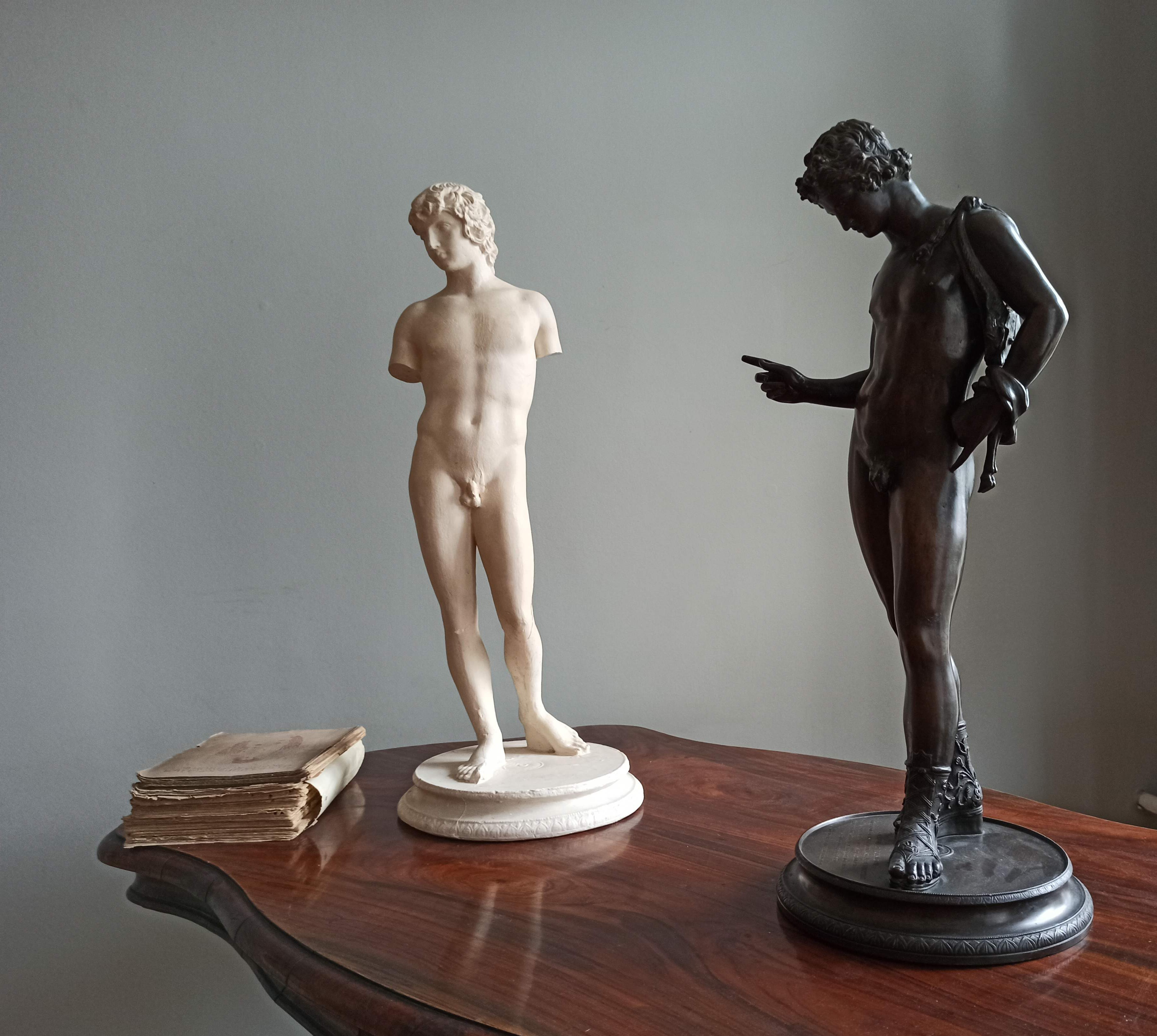
Antinous and Narcissus, Historical Queer Museum (in Exile), Saint Petersburg.

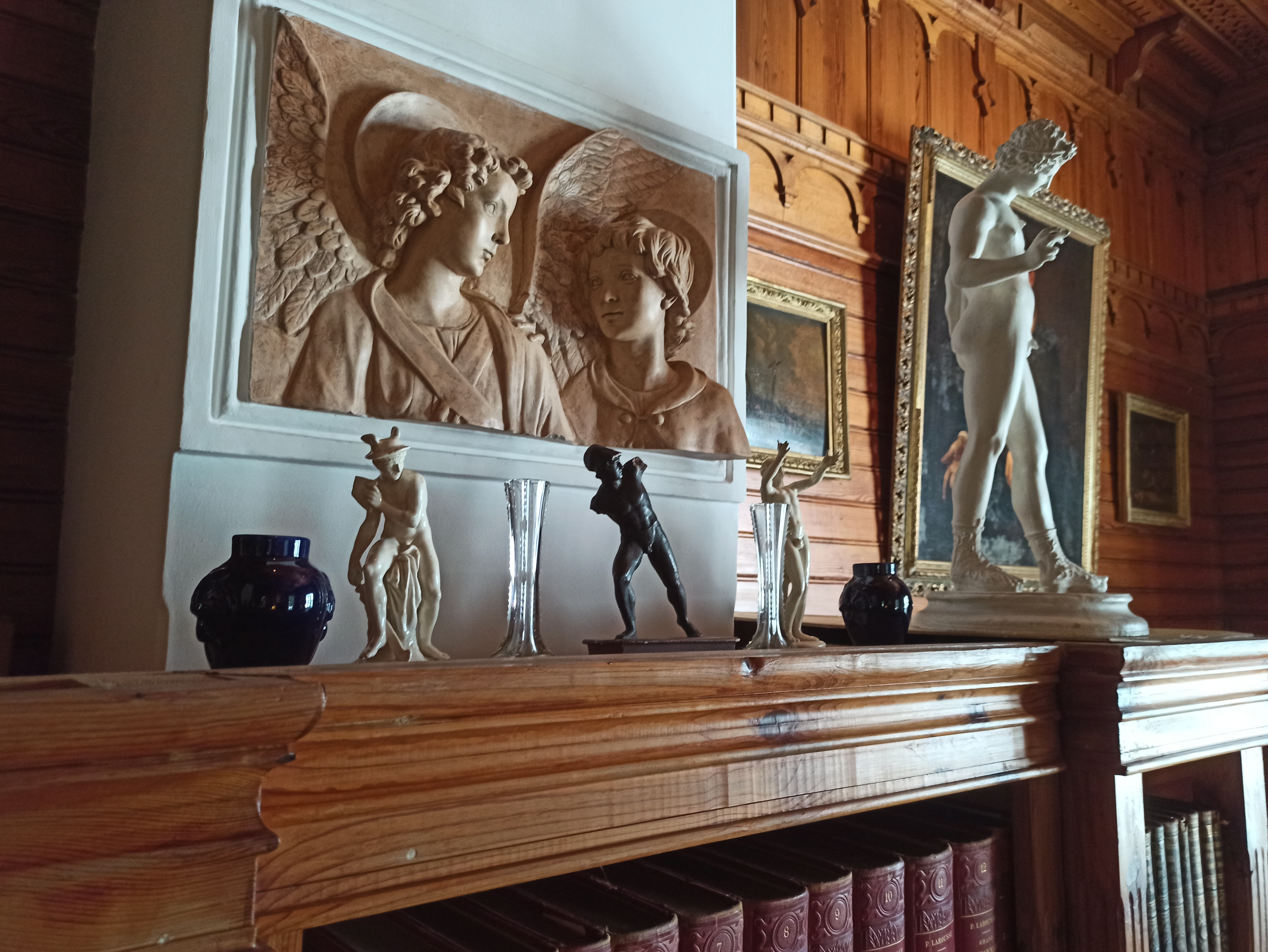
Modest Tchaikovsky's room, Tchaikovsky State House-Museum, Kiln.

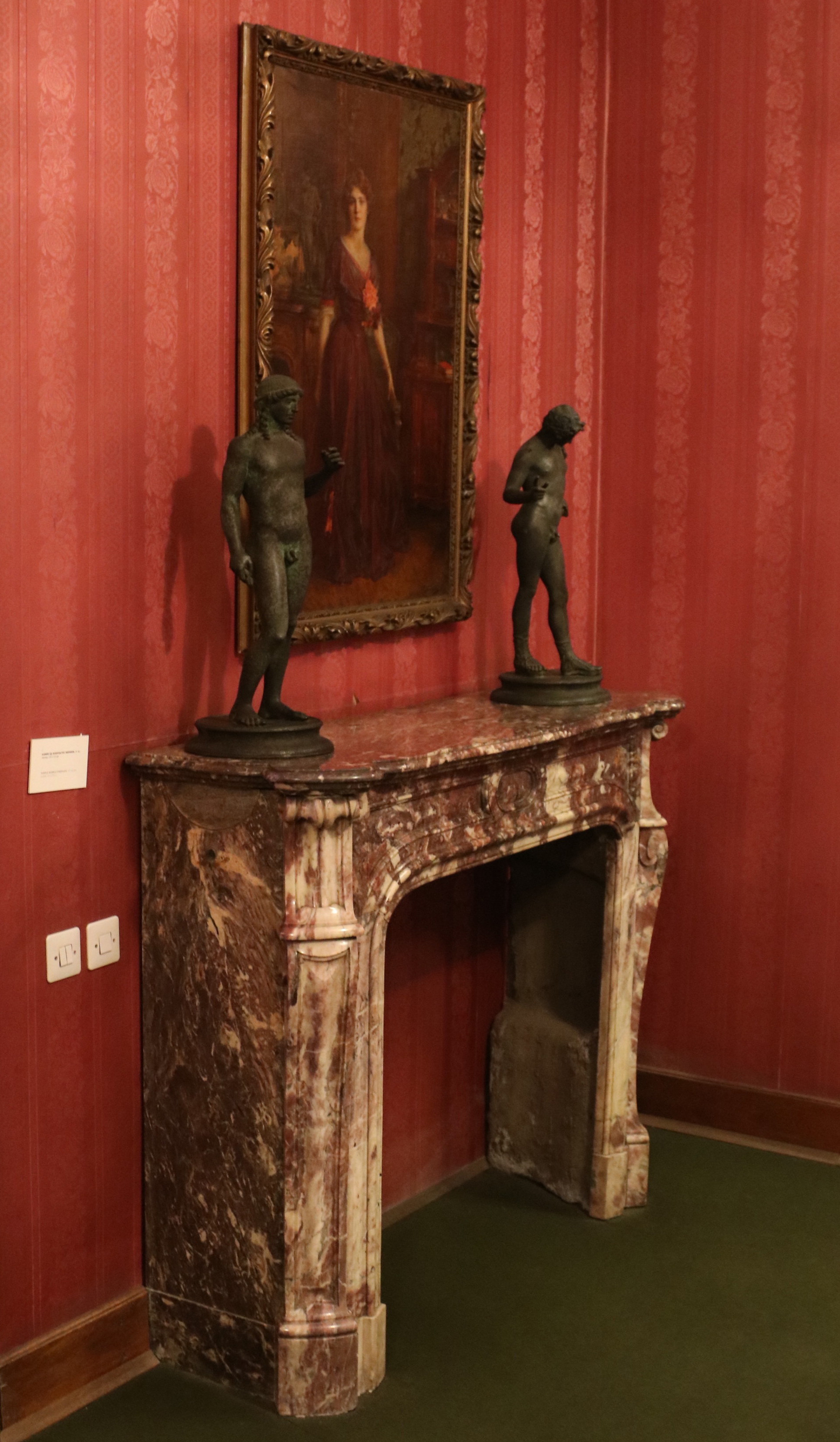
Museum of Paja Jovanović, Belgrade.

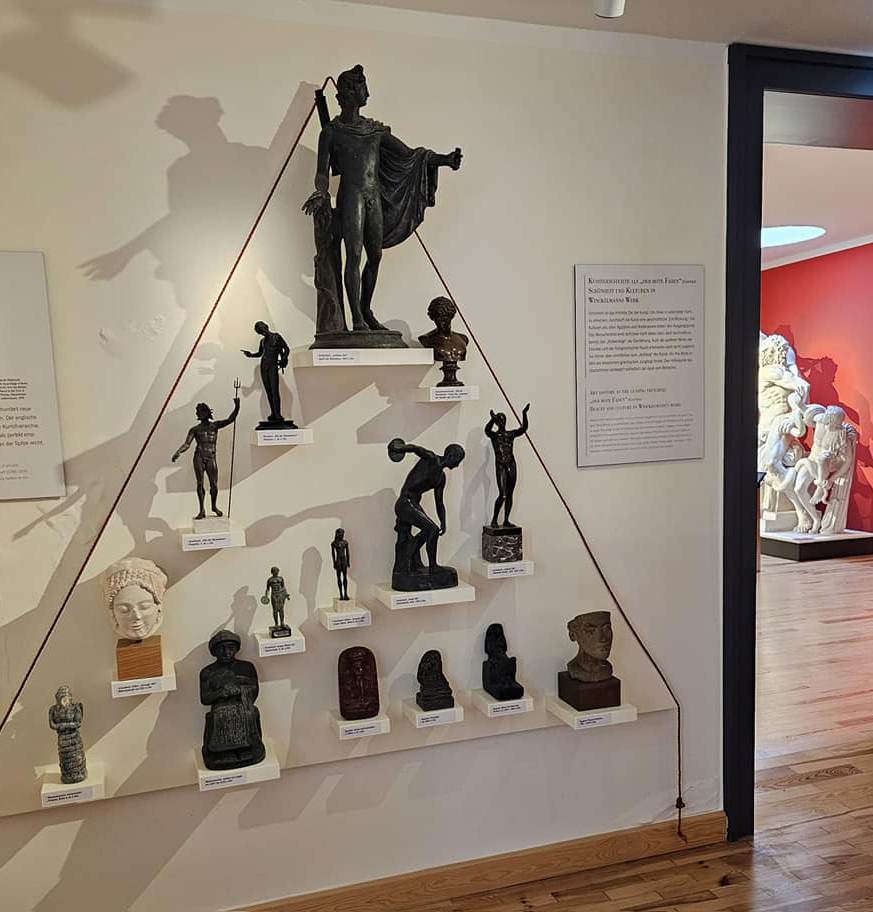
Winckelmann Museum, Stendal, Germany.

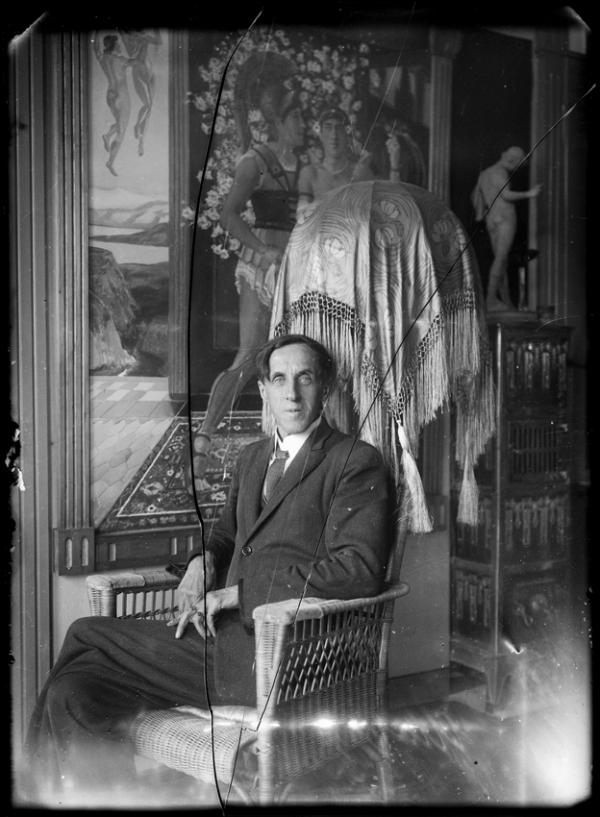
Eduard von Mayer at the Sanctuarium Artis Elisarion, Switzerland, 1930.

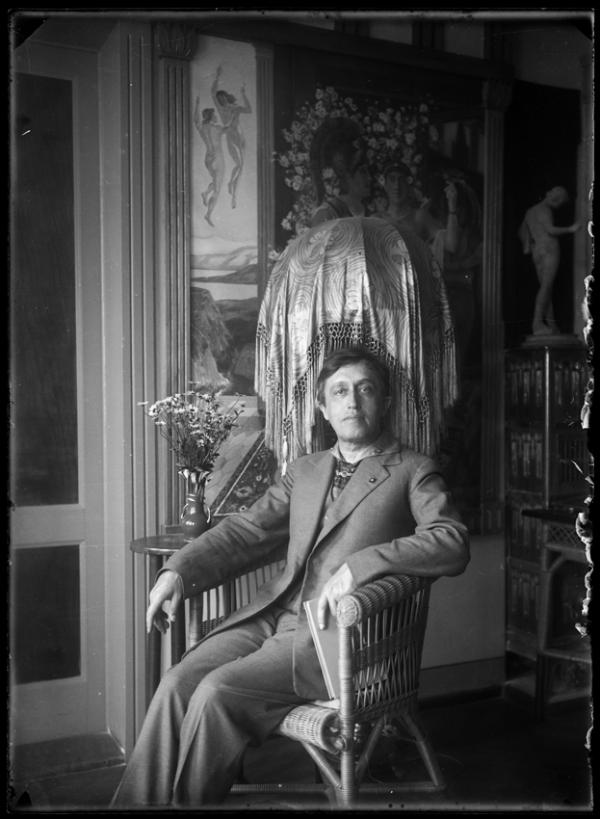
Elisar von Kupffer at the Sanctuarium Artis Elisarion, Switzerland, 1930.

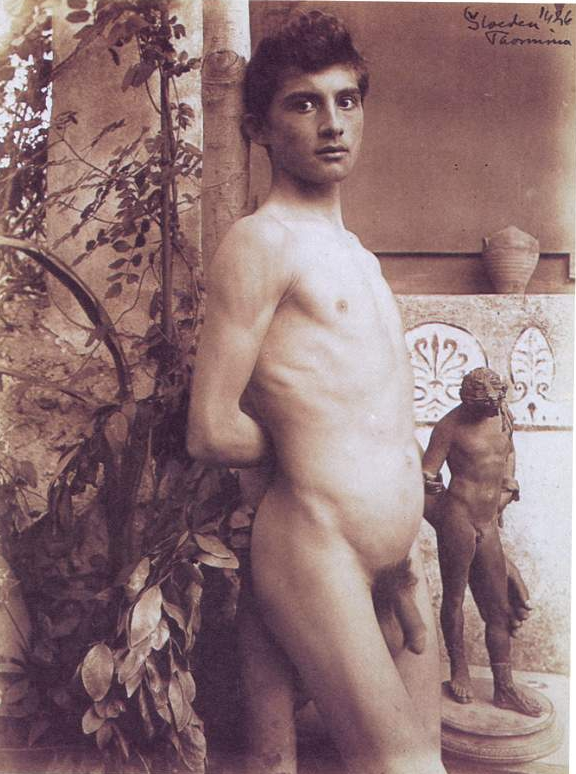
Giacomo Lanfranchi photographed by Wilhelm von Gloeden in Taormina.

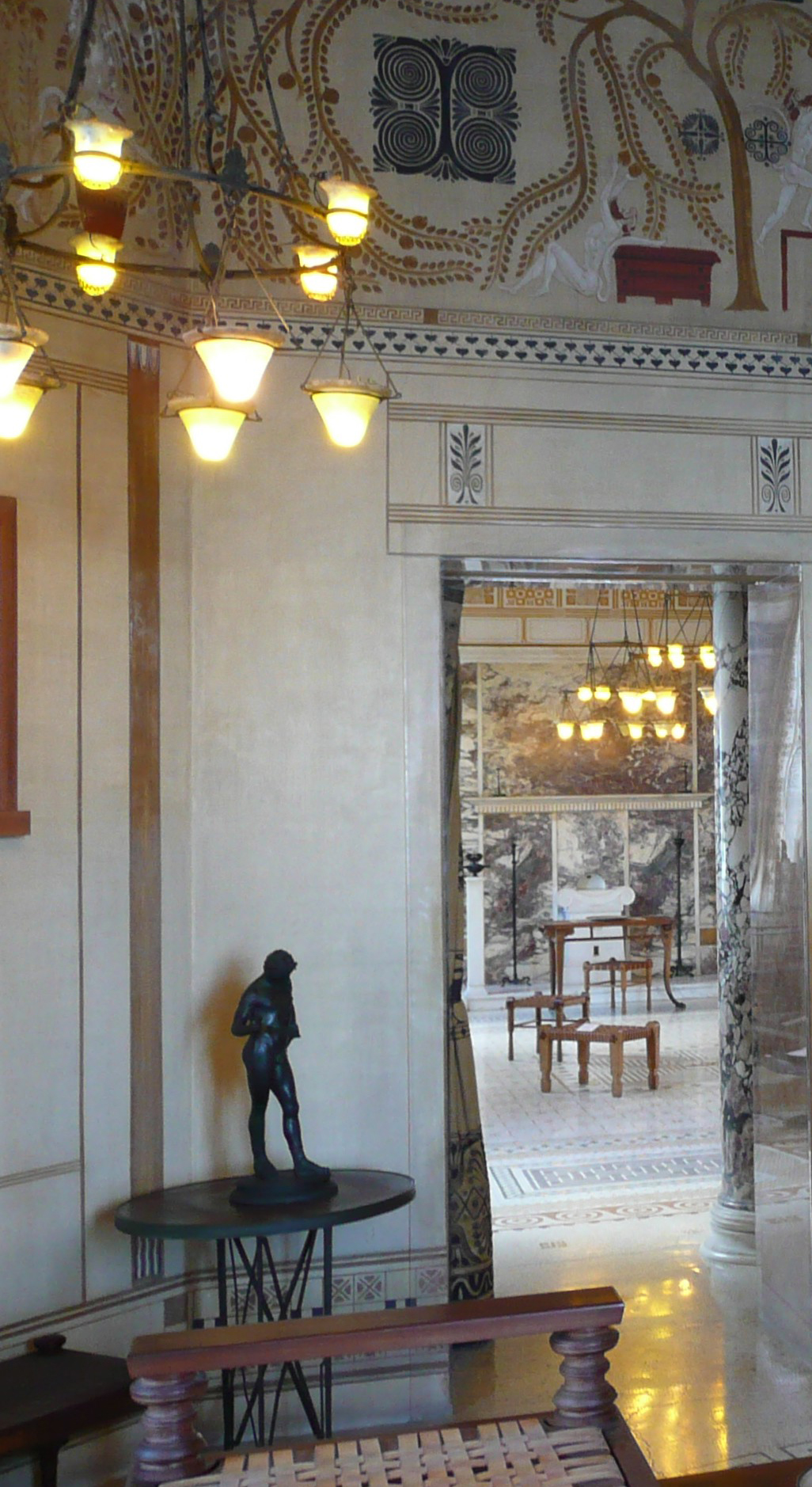
Dining room, Villa Kerylos, Beaulieu-sur-Mer, France.

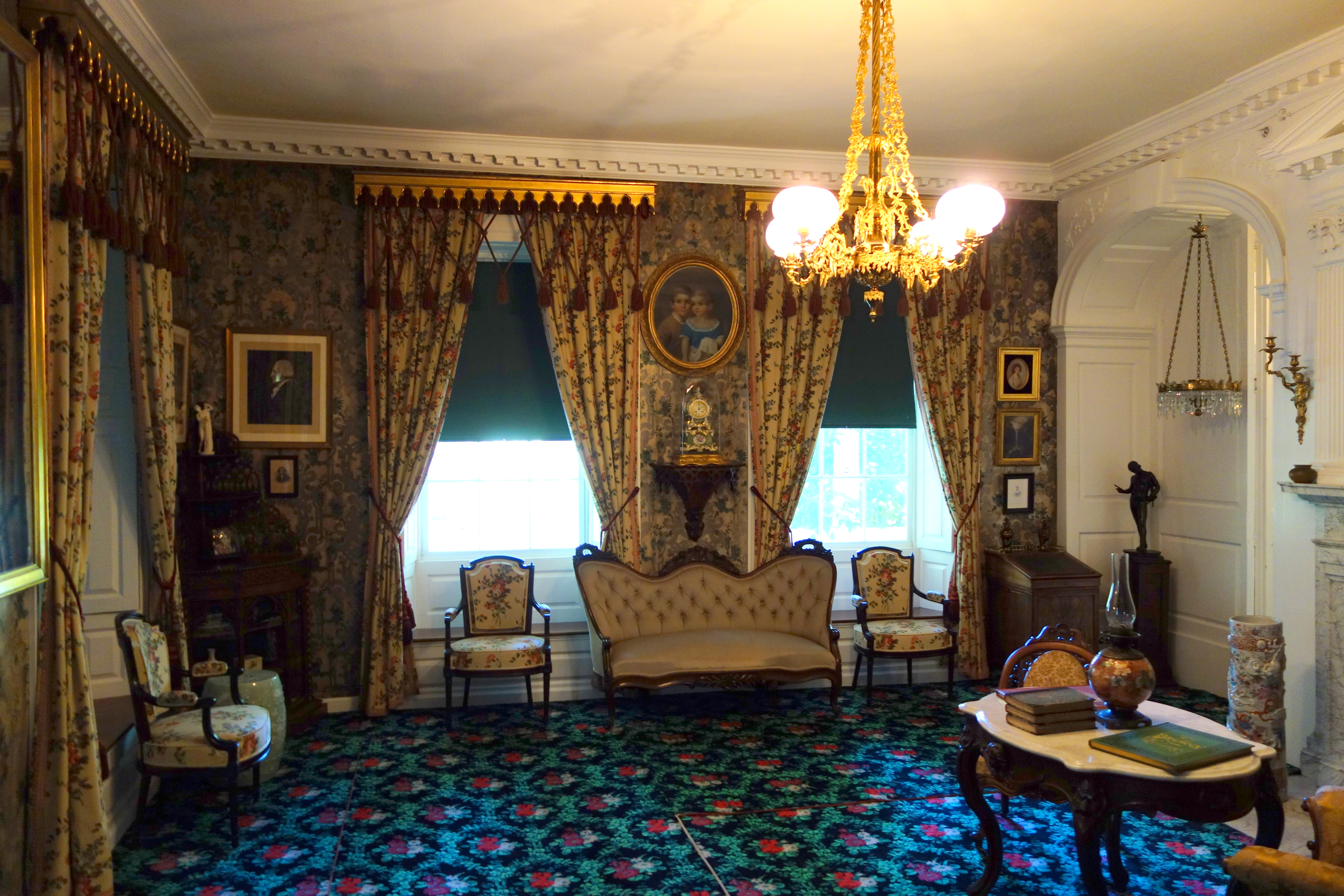
Drawing room, Longfellow National Historic Site, Cambridge, Massachusetts.

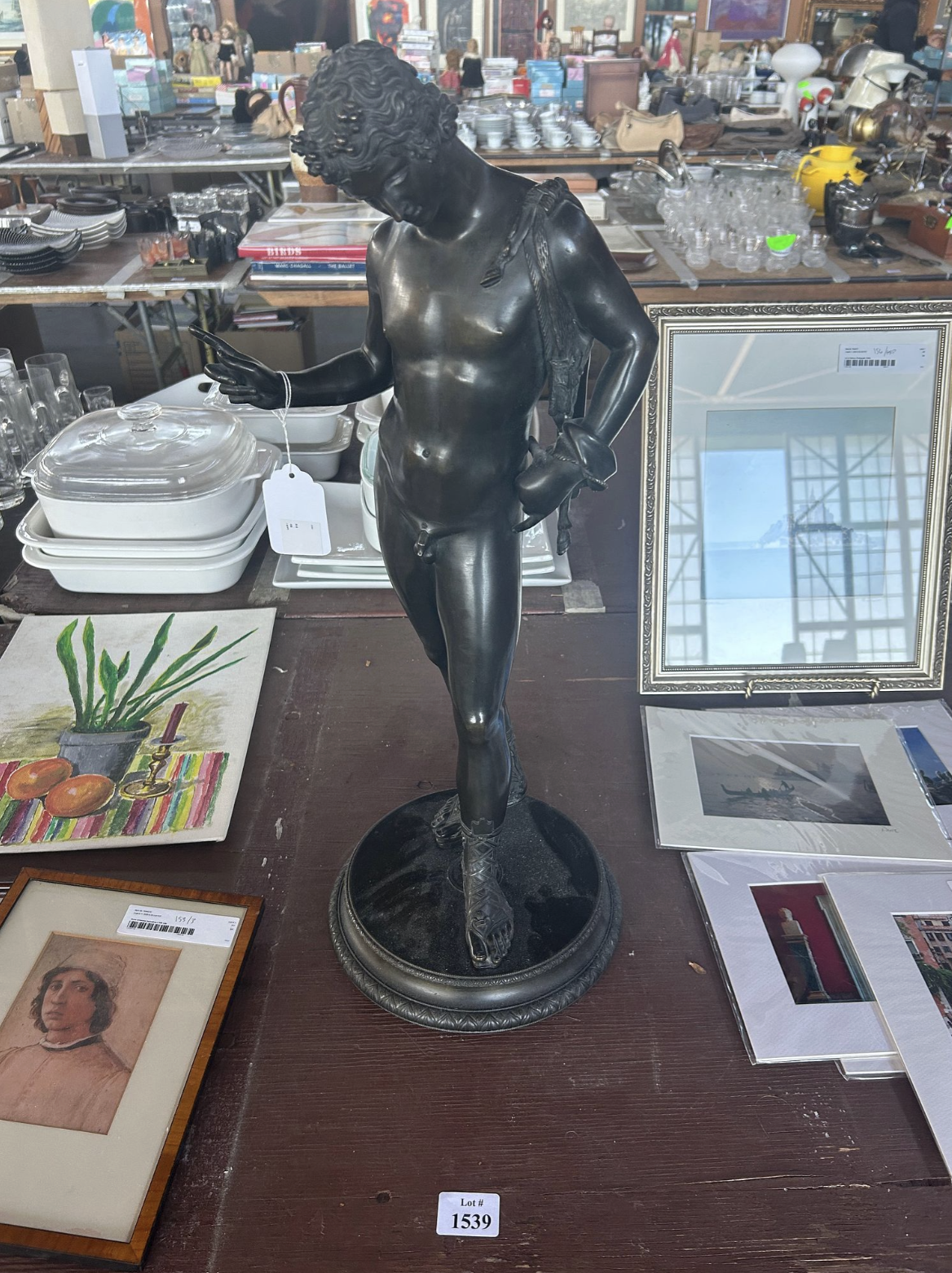
A Sommer/Gemito copy among bric-a-brac at a California auction in 2025.

== Bibliography ==
- Conforti, Louis (c. 1889). The National Museum of Naples, Naples: c. 1899.
- di Giacomo, Salvatore (1905). Vincenzo Gemito: la vita, l'opera, Naples: 1905.
- Dumas, F. G. (1882). Illustrated Biographies of Modern Artists, Paris: Baschet, 1882.
- Dwyer, E. (1982). Pompeian Domestic Sculpture: A Study of Five Pompeian Houses and Their Contents. Rome: G. Bretschneider. pp. 53–54, 108, 123, 135.
- Ellmann, Richard (1988). Oscar Wilde, Knopf: 1988.
- Gryakalova, N. Yu. (2016). "From Ekphrasis to Intertext: regarding the poem by Vyacheslav Ivanov, 'Narcissus, Pompeian Bronze'" (in Russian; includes text of the poem), pp. 114–123.
- Gryakalova N. Yu. (2018). "Narcissus versus Dionysus: regarding the poem by Vyacheslav Ivanov, 'Narcissus, Pompeian Bronze': visual artifact, literary topic and prospects of intertextual analysis" (in Russian), Intertextual analysis: principles and limits, edited by A. A. Karpov and A. D. Stepanov, СПб: СПбГУ, pp. 132–141. ISBN 978-5-288-05780-9.
- Haskell, Francis and Nicholas Penny. (1981). "The Narcissus". Taste and the Antique: The Lure of Classical Sculpture, 1500-1900. New Haven; London: Yale University Press. ISBN 9780300029130.
- Kennedy, Allison R. (2004). "Dionysiac sculpture at Pompeii". Domestic statuary at Pompeii: the sculptural repertoires of Venus, Hercules, and Dionysus (thesis). Hamilton, Ontario: McMaster University. pp. 65–70.
- Kuivalainen, Ilkka (2021). The Portrayal of Pompeian Bacchus. Commentationes Humanarum Litterarum 140. Vaasa: The Finnish Society of Sciences and Letters. pp. 219–220. ISBN 978-951-653-463-6.
- McDonough, Christopher. (September 2011). "Property of Tennessee Williams. What a souvenir statue tells us about his writing". Humanities. 32 (5). Washington, DC: National Endowment for the Humanities. ISSN 0018-7526.
- Monaco, Domenico (1883). A Complete Handbook to the National Museum in Naples, 3rd edition, London: 1883.
