= Elisar von Kupffer =

Baltic German painter and writer

Elisàr January Emanuel von Kupffer
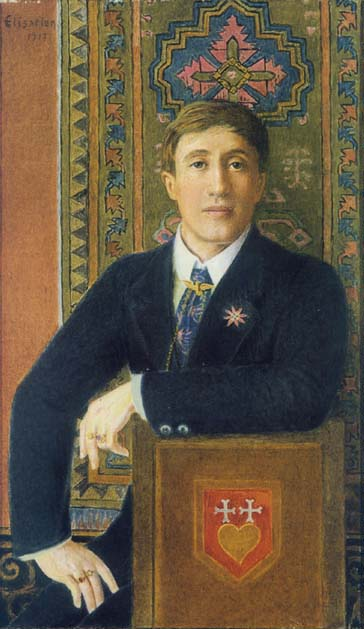
- Elisàr von Kupffer. Self-portrait (1917)
- Born: 20 February 1872
- Died: 31 October 1942 (aged 70)
- Occupations: Artist, anthologist, poet, historian, translator, playwright
- Partner: Eduard von Mayer
- Writing career
- Pen name: Elisarion

Elisàr January Emanuel von Kupffer (20 February 1872 – 31 October 1942) was a Baltic German artist, anthologist, poet, historian, translator, and playwright. He used the pseudonym "Elisarion" for most of his writings. In his later years, Kupffer embraced antisemitic, racist and fascist ideas and became an enthusiastic supporter of Adolf Hitler, whom he addressed in admiring letters in 1940 and 1942, and sought to associate his own ideas with the political project of the Third Reich.

== Biography ==
=== Early life ===
He was born on 20 February 1872, in Sophiental, near Reval (now Tallinn), Estonia, the son of Adolf von Kupffer (1833–1896), a doctor from an aristocratic German Baltic family, tracing back to the 16th century. As part of an ethnic minority in the Baltic region of Russian Empire, the family kept strict German culture. He was a third of four children in von Kupffer family. From an early age he was in low health, having suffered through meningitis, rheumatic joint disease, scarlet fever and measles. The scarlet fever cause him to have single-sided deafness However he was also a good student and at the age of nine he wrote his first play, Don Irsino.

The political situation in the Baltic provinces changed significantly after the assassination of Tsar Alexander II in 1881. Alexander II had generally tolerated the linguistic and religious privileges of the Baltic German population, whereas the reign of Alexander III was marked by stronger Russification policies and the growth of Pan-Slavism. Kupffer entered school in Reval in 1883, the year of Alexander III's coronation, and his family was also affected by these changes.

Kupffer began learning Russian at the age of eight, although he did not regard the language as part of his own cultural identity and never became fully fluent in it. In 1883, the family moved from Sophiental to the manor of Jootma. The Baltic Empire-style manor house, with its temple-like portico, remained an important image of home for Kupffer throughout his life and later became associated in his writings and artistic imagination with an idealised vision of paradise.

At the age of thirteen, he entered the German Annenschule in St. Petersburg. It was near there, in Levashovo, that he met the historian and philosopher Eduard von Mayer (1873–1960), who later became his lifelong partner and collaborator. He also met his first partner, Agnes von Hoyningen-Huene (1872–1961) there.

In 1892, Kupffer's mother was diagnosed with cancer and died in April 1893, shortly before his final school examinations. Her death had a strong effect on him and contributed to his growing distance from the religious beliefs of his protestant upbringing.

Later in 1893, Kupffer chose not to return home and instead began studying Oriental languages in Saint Petersburg. He soon abandoned the course, which he considered too "school-like", and transferred to the faculty of law, where he passed his first examinations in 1894. During this period, Eduard von Mayer left Saint Petersburg for Southern Russia and later Geneva, where he continued his studies. Kupffer remained in Saint Petersburg and, reflecting on his uncertainty about his future, wrote:

There is an uncanny lull in my soul. However, I do not feel that a storm will follow. Now that I am moving from one decision to the next, I feel calmer than ever…. I hope that my faith will continue to save me from shipwrecks.

After passing his first-year law examinations in 1894, Kupffer spent the summer at Jootma. During this period he wrote the play Die toten Götter (The Dead Gods) and became increasingly dissatisfied with the social milieu of the Baltic German aristocracy.

In October 1894, Kupffer travelled to Germany for the first time. He spent time in Berlin and Munich, where he studied history and philosophy while increasingly devoting himself to literary work. In 1895, he abandoned his legal studies and moved more decisively towards a literary and artistic career.

=== Career ===
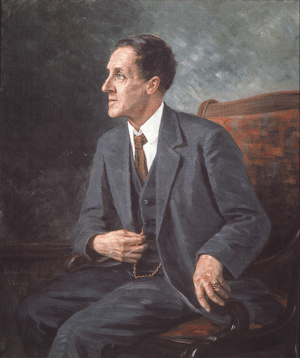
Eduard von Mayer by Clara Grosch (1917)

In 1895, his first collection of poetry, Leben und Lieben (Life and Love), was published in Munich by Verlag Akropolis. Later in 1895, Kupffer settled in Berlin, where he attended lectures in history, ethnography, economics and art history. In 1896 wrote the dramas Der Herr der Welt (Master of the World), and Irrlichter (Wisps) as well as three one-act plays. In 1897 he published the anthology Ehrlos (Infamous, or Dishonorable).

Mayer graduated in 1897 and they travelled throughout Italy, Sicily, Southern France and Geneva before returning to Berlin. They spent the summer in Thuringia and Heiligendamm and went back to Italy in 1899. Early next year, Adolf Brand published Kupffer's influential anthology of homoerotic literature, Lieblingminne und Freundesliebe in der Weltliteratur (roughly, "Love of Favourites and Love Between Friends in World Literature". Lieblingminne is a neologism created by Kupffer). The anthology was researched and created, in part, as a protest against the imprisonment of Oscar Wilde in England. It was reprinted in 1995.

Elisar von Kupffer in 1902

In 1908 he published a book on Il Sodoma, the Renaissance artist. In 1911, he and Mayer founded the publishing house Klaristische Verlag Akropolis in Munich and Kupffer published three major works: a play, Aino und Tio, Hymnen der heiligen Burg (Hymns of the Holy Castle) and Ein neuer Flug und eine heilige Burg (A New Flight and a Holy Castle). His work was also published and reviewed in the gay magazine Akademos, published by Jacques d'Adelswärd-Fersen. That same year, he and Mayer announced the creation of a "new religion", Klarismus (Clarity), and established a community in Weimar. The following year he published a book on Klarismus called Der unbekannte Gott (The Unknown God). In 1913, the Brogi Gallery in Florence hosted his first art exhibition. Later that year, a Klarist community was established in Zürich.

=== Between World Wars ===
In 1915, amid growing anti-German sentiment in Italy during World War I, Kupffer and Eduard von Mayer left Florence and moved to Switzerland. They initially stayed in several Swiss cities and spa towns, partly because of Kupffer's recurring health problems, before settling in Muralto, near Locarno. They later moved to nearby Minusio. In 1922, Kupffer and Mayer obtained Swiss citizenship.

While living in Muralto, Kupffer began work on what became his principal pictorial work, Die Klarwelt der Seligen (The Clear World of the Blessed). Conceived as the central visual expression of Klarismus, the monumental cyclorama depicts numerous nude and androgynous male figures in an idealised landscape. Some of the figures bear Kupffer's own features, while others were based on Mayer and on Luigi Taricco.

Kupffer also used photography extensively as part of his artistic practice. He produced staged self-portraits and photographic studies that served as models for figures in his paintings. His frequent use of his own body as a model became a recurring characteristic of his work, particularly in the Klarwelt.

He also used other models for his work. Among his principal models was Luigi "Gino" Taricco, a young Piedmontese whom Kupffer and Mayer had met in Genoa in 1909. Taricco's physique and facial features closely resembled Kupffer's own, and he became a principal model for the youthful male figures in ''Die Klarwelt der Seligen''.

Kupffer and Mayer had already established Clarist groups in Weimar and Zürich. Their original ambition was to create a monumental Clarist centre in Germany, but the project was never realized. Instead, they increasingly concentrated their religious, artistic and philosophical activities in Ticino.

In 1925, they purchased a property in Minusio and established Sanctuarium Artis Elisarion, that was formally opened in 1927 and served simultaneously as their home, a gallery for Kupffer's work, and the religious and organizational centre of Clarism. The interior was arranged as a sequence of symbolically decorated rooms intended to guide visitors from the imperfect everyday world towards the idealised Klarwelt of Clarist thought.

During the following years, Kupffer devoted much of his time to decorating the Sanctuarium, receiving visitors, promoting Clarism and completing Die Klarwelt der Seligen. His literary output declined considerably during this period. The cyclorama was completed around 1930, and in 1939 a purpose-built rotunda was added to the Sanctuarium to provide it with a permanent exhibition space.

During the 1930s, the Sanctuarium attracted an increasing number of visitors and became the principal centre of the Clarist movement. At the same time, Kupffer's political and philosophical thought became increasingly associated with racial theories, antisemitism and the radical fascism. His later writings included racialised and anti-Bolshevik ideas, and modern scholarship has linked aspects of his thought to fascist ideology.

In the final years of his life, Kupffer became an enthusiastic supporter of Adolf Hitler. He wrote admiring letters to Hitler in 1940 and 1942 and attempted to present his own Clarist artistic and religious project as compatible with the political transformation of Germany under the Third Reich. He also sought recognition and support for his ideas

After the outbreak of World War II, the flow of visitors to the Sanctuarium declined sharply, bringing an end to the period of growing public interest that had accompanied the completion of the rotunda in 1939. The war effectively curtailed visits to the Clarist sanctuary at a time when Kupffer's health was also deteriorating. Despite this decline and his worsening condition, he continued his efforts to disseminate Clarism until his death in 1942.

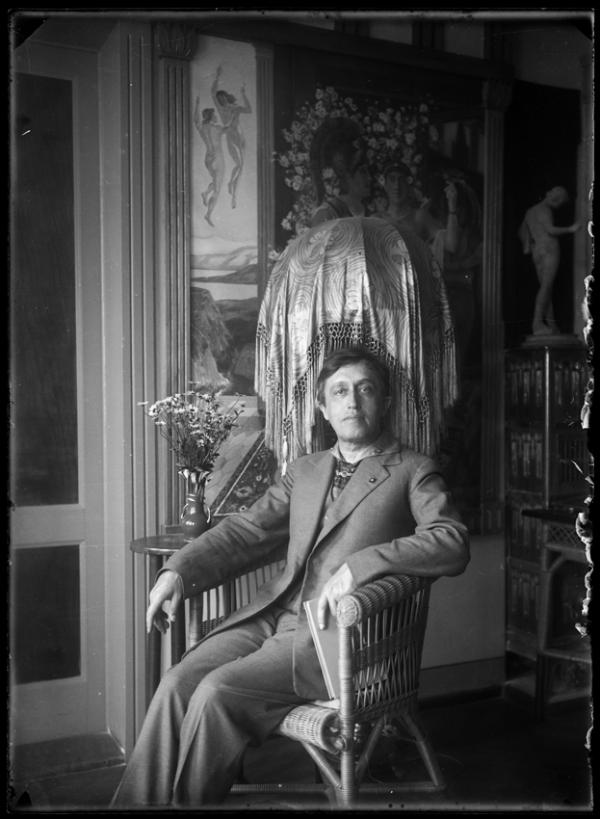
Elisar von Kupffer in 1930

=== Later life and death ===
As his health declined, he became reclusive and died on 31 October 1942. Since 1981 the "Sanctuarium Artis Elisarion" has been a Museum dedicated to Kupffer's work. The villa was willed to the municipality of Minusio, and his ashes are interred inside, together with Mayer's. The Elisarion Community is satirically referenced as the "Polysadrion" (roughly; Place of Many Idiots), in the 1931 novel Schloss Gripsholm by Kurt Tucholsky.

== Personal life ==
Kupffer met the historian and philosopher Eduard von Mayer in 1891 near Levashovo, outside Saint Petersburg. Their relationship initially developed through shared intellectual and artistic interests. Kupffer later stressed that their bond had not begun as an immediate love affair, and during the early 1890s he was still emotionally involved with Agnes von Hoyningen-Huene.

Mayer's departure from Saint Petersburg for Switzerland in 1893 intensified their attachment. In December of that year, Mayer wrote to Kupffer that he had not expected to miss him so deeply, while Kupffer remained emotionally divided between Mayer and Agnes. During the summer of 1894, Kupffer reflected extensively on the nature of his feelings for Mayer. He rejected contemporary medical theories of sexuality as inadequate to describe his experience and instead interpreted his attraction in idealised, classical and Platonic terms.

In January 1895, Mayer attempted suicide during a severe personal crisis, an event that had a profound effect on Kupffer. Later that year the two were reunited and, in the autumn of 1895, moved together to Berlin, where they shared accommodation. Kupffer's relationship with Agnes subsequently ended, while his bond with Mayer developed into a lifelong partnership.

Kupffer and Mayer subsequently lived and worked together for the remainder of Kupffer's life, collaborating on literary, artistic and philosophical projects until Kupffer's death in 1942.

=== Adolf Schmitz ===
In Berlin, Kupffer developed a close relationship with Adolf Schmitz (1886–1916), the young son of his landlady, whom he met around 1898. Kupffer usually referred to him as "Fino" or "Fino von Grajewo", while Schmitz also appeared in his artistic work as the "Eros Bote" ("Messenger of Eros"). He became one of the first youthful models whom Kupffer photographed and painted.

In 1900, Eduard von Mayer travelled to Berlin to bring Schmitz to Switzerland, where he spent an extended period with Kupffer and Mayer. The three subsequently travelled together through Switzerland and Germany. During their stay at Clarens, Kupffer painted a portrait of Schmitz wearing a wreath of autumn crocuses. After returning to Berlin, Schmitz regularly visited Kupffer and Mayer, who also supervised part of his education: Kupffer taught him French and history, while Mayer taught him English and mathematics.

Kupffer sought permission from Schmitz's mother for the youth to join their household permanently and proposed arranging his training as an art photographer. Although she initially agreed, she later apprenticed her son to a dentist instead. Kupffer and Mayer subsequently moved to Florence without him. In his autobiography, Kupffer described the separation as deeply painful and wrote openly of his love for Schmitz.

Kupffer and Schmitz met again in Berlin in 1904 and later resumed correspondence. Kupffer reproduced a letter in which Schmitz affirmed his continuing love for him. According to Kupffer, Mayer initially withheld the letter out of concern that a renewed attachment would adversely affect Kupffer's health. Their surviving correspondence and Kupffer's retrospective account indicate that Schmitz occupied an important emotional position in Kupffer's life, although the precise physical nature of their relationship is unknown.

During the First World War, Schmitz served in the Imperial German Army. Kupffer received a final greeting from him from a military hospital in Brussels in 1915. Schmitz was killed on 7 July 1916 near Péronne, while serving as a medical corporal in the Guard.

=== Luigi "Gino" Taricco ===
In October 1909, while visiting Genoa with Eduard von Mayer, Kupffer met Luigi "Gino" Taricco, a young Piedmontese who was then associated with the church of Santa Maria di Castello. Taricco was approximately sixteen years old at the time. After an exchange of correspondence and a visit to Kupffer in Florence, Taricco left the monastery with his father's consent and joined Kupffer and Mayer in early 1910.

Taricco subsequently became a close friend, member of their household and one of Kupffer's principal artistic models. He travelled with Kupffer and Mayer and later lived with them near Fiesole, outside Florence. Kupffer used Taricco extensively in photographic studies and paintings, particularly as a model for youthful male figures. Taricco's physical proportions and facial features were similar to Kupffer's own youthful appearance, and he became one of the principal prototypes for the figures in Die Klarwelt der Seligen.

Kupffer's writings describe his attachment to Taricco in strongly affectionate terms, although the nature of their relationship is not known to have been sexual. Eduard von Mayer remained Kupffer's lifelong partner. Taricco nevertheless occupied an important place within their household and artistic circle during the years immediately preceding the First World War.

Taricco continued his education while living with them and later undertook voluntary military service. After Kupffer and Mayer left Italy for Switzerland in 1915, Taricco initially remained in their Florence residence. Following Italy's entry into the war, he joined the Royal Italian Army and served at the front as an officer candidate, later attaining officer rank. He and Kupffer maintained a regular correspondence during the war.

Taricco survived the conflict and later married and became a father. Kupffer was still referring to him in his writings around 1940. Taricco's exact date of birth and details of his later life and death remain unclear. Surviving photographs and portraits of him are preserved in the Elisarion collections, and his appearance remains recognisable in numerous figures throughout Kupffer's later work.

=== Sexuality ===
Kupffer's understanding of sexuality did not correspond closely to the sexual identity categories that were emerging during his lifetime. Although his life and work have frequently been discussed within the history of homosexuality, Kupffer rejected the term "homosexual" as a description of himself and opposed contemporary medical theories that treated same-sex attraction as a pathological or biologically defined condition.

In his autobiography, Kupffer described experiencing attraction to both women and men. Reflecting on his youthful attraction to a girl, he wrote that "it was not the sex of the person that attracted me sensually, but rather a particular nature and appearance". He likewise maintained that an attraction to feminine beauty could coexist with affectionate and erotic feelings towards boys and young men. Rather than identifying this experience as homosexuality, Kupffer eventually incorporated it into the philosophy of Clarism, describing his ideal as "not 'homosexuality', not an intermediate stage, but a higher stage".

Kupffer's adult life was nevertheless centred on his lifelong relationship with Eduard von Mayer, with whom he lived for several decades, while his writings and art repeatedly explored male beauty, relationships between men and idealised youthful male bodies. Historian Harry Oosterhuis consequently places Kupffer within the history of homosexual emancipation, while noting his rejection of homosexual identity and medical sexology. Art historian Damien Delille interprets Kupffer and Mayer's theories as an "alternative approach to sexuality and spirituality", in which androgyny and the transcendence of established sexual categories formed part of what he terms "queer mysticism". Historian Ben Miller similarly describes Kupffer's thought as an example of queer political homosexuality while emphasising that Kupffer himself ultimately rejected the homosexual label.

== Works ==
- "Leben und Lieben. Gedichte" (1895).
- Irrlichter (1900, three theatreworks: Andrei, Erich and Narkissos).
- "Klima und Dichtung. Ein Beitrag zur Psychophysik" (1907).
- "Giovan Antonio — il Sodoma. Eine Seelen- und Kunststudie von Elisàr von Kupffer" (1908) in: Jahrbuch für sexuelle Zwischenstufen, edition IX.
- Aino und Tio (1907).
- "Was soll uns der Klarismus? — Nationale Kraft" (1912).
- "Die Gotteslästerungen der Bibel und der Antike" (1912).
- "Hymnen der Heiligen Burg" (1913).
- "3000 Jahre Bolschewismus" (1919).
- "Heldische Sicht und Froher Glaube" (1942).
- "Aus einem wahrhaften Leben" (1943).
