= Sonia E. Howe =

Russian essayist

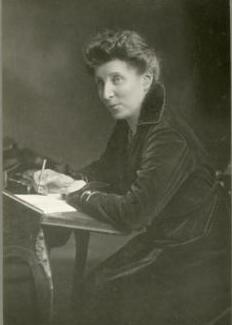
Howe in 1917

Sonia "Sonny" Elizabeth Howe (born 1871; date of death unknown) was an Académie Française laureate Russian essayist of Baltic Germans descent.

== Early life ==
Sonia Elizabeth Howe was born in 1871 in Analowo, near Saint Petersburg, the daughter of Charlotte von Mayer and Dr. Karl von Mayer, a physician and founder of the Protestant Hospital of Saint Petersburg. Her younger brother was Eduard von Mayer, the founder of Clarism.

== Career ==
Sonia E. Howe is the author of A Thousand Years of Russian History (1915), False Dmitri, a Russian romance and tragedy described by British eye-witnesses, 1604-1612 (1916), Real Russians (1917), and Some Russian heroes, saints and sinners, legendary and historical (1917) on her native country.

In Odd Patterns in the Weaving (1925) she recounts her life in various parishes in England; her adventures in Gothenburg and later as a missionary in China; of her activities in connection with the relief of political exiles in Northern Russia and Siberia in pre-World War I days; and how she helped 70,000 Russians to pass through England in the autumn of 1914.

In 1931 she published Les heroes du Sahara with a preface of Hubert Lyautey, translated in English as Lyautey of Morocco.

Howe won for two time prizes from the Académie Française: in 1932 she won 500F for Les héros du Sahara (Prix d’Académie) and in 1937 she won 2,000F for L’Europe et Madagascar (Prix de la langue Française).

In 1938 she published The drama of Madagascar.

In 1946 she published Les grands navigateurs à la recherche des épices (In quest of spices), an history of the explorers who, in search of spices, discovered new worlds.

In 1949 she published Plus précieux que l'or.

== Personal life ==
Sonia E. Howe married an English evangelical clergyman.
