= Petr Voskresensky-Stekanov =

Russian LGBT rights activist (born 1985)

Petr Voskresensky
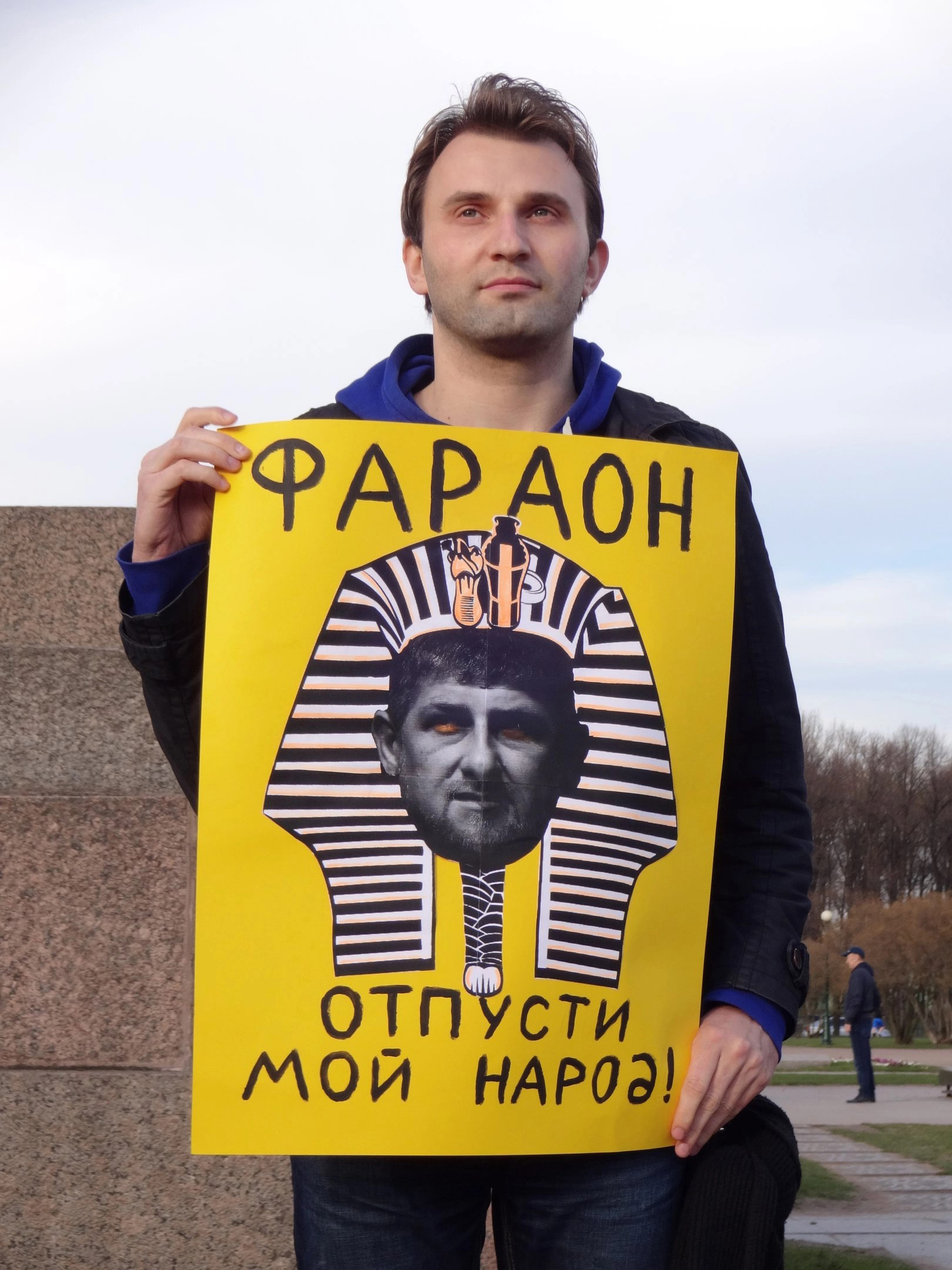
- A poster with Ramzan Kadyrov and the demand "Pharaoh, let my people go!". Protest against the genocide of LGBT people in Chechnya. May 17, 2017
- Born: Petr Alexandrovich Stekanov; 18 June 1985 (age 41); Leningrad, Russian SFSR, Soviet Union
- Education: Pavlov First Saint Petersburg State Medical University (2008)
- Occupations: Human rights and LGBTQ activist, researcher of LGBTQ history, doctor

Petr Alexandrovich Voskresensky-Stekanov (also spelled Pyotr, Peter and Voskresenskii, Voskresenski, Russian: Пётр Александрович Воскресенский-Стеканов; born 18 June 1985) is a Russian and German doctor and human rights activist.

== Biography ==
Petr Voskresensky was born on 18 June 1985 in Saint Petersburg. His family is of mixed ancestry (Ukrainians, Belarusians, Russians, Lithuanians and Poles). His father was a radio engineer, one of the authors of the Buran project, his mother was a biologist. His childhood was also significantly influenced by the family of his mother's sister, a famous St. Petersburg artist Olga Tsutskova.

Petr Voskresensky graduated from the Pavlov First St. Petersburg State Medical University with honors in 2008. He worked as an anesthesiologist in the clinic of the faculty surgery academic department in the Pavlov Medical University, then in the Emergency Situations Ministry hospital.

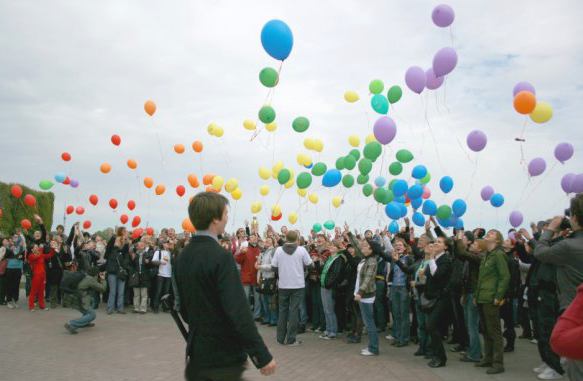
RainbowFlash 2009 in St. Petersburg

In 2008, Petr Voskresensky became one of the founders of the St. Petersburg LGBT organization "Coming Out". In 2009, he was one of the organizers of the first Rainbowflash in Russia, timed to coincide with the Day Against Homophobia on May 17. About 100-250 people came to this event in St. Petersburg, making it the largest LGBT action in Russia at the time.

Since 2009, Petr Voskresensky was one of the co-organizers of the annual March Against Hate, dedicated to the memory of the scientist and anti-fascist Nikolai Girenko, who was murdered by neo-Nazis. Voskresensky organized an LGBT group at this march. After Russia invaded Ukraine in 2014, St. Petersburg authorities began banning the March Against Hate. And in 2016, on the eve of the action, police raided the office of LGBT activists, confiscated posters, and Voskresensky was arrested.

Petr Voskresensky was the organizer of a Russian-language group at Baltic Pride from 2014 to 2019 that raised issues including the Russian-Ukrainian war, Russian imperial homophobic policies, and the genocide of LGBT people in Chechnya.

In 2014, Petr Voskresensky became the author of the project of Historical LGBT Excursions in St. Petersburg. He was prompted by the news of the death of art historian Yuri Piryutko, who had previously organized similar events. As part of this educational project, Voskresensky also campaigned to have the criminalization of homosexuals in the USSR recognized as political repression. During one such event, he was detained and beaten by police. Voskresensky participated with his tours in the Open Map Festival, Amnesty International and Queerfest. Based on the material he researched, Voskresensky created the first LGBT map of St. Petersburg. He also created a queer tour of the Hermitage. In 2022, Voskresensky used it to compile the first queer catalog of this museum, which was presented at the QueerFest in St. Petersburg.

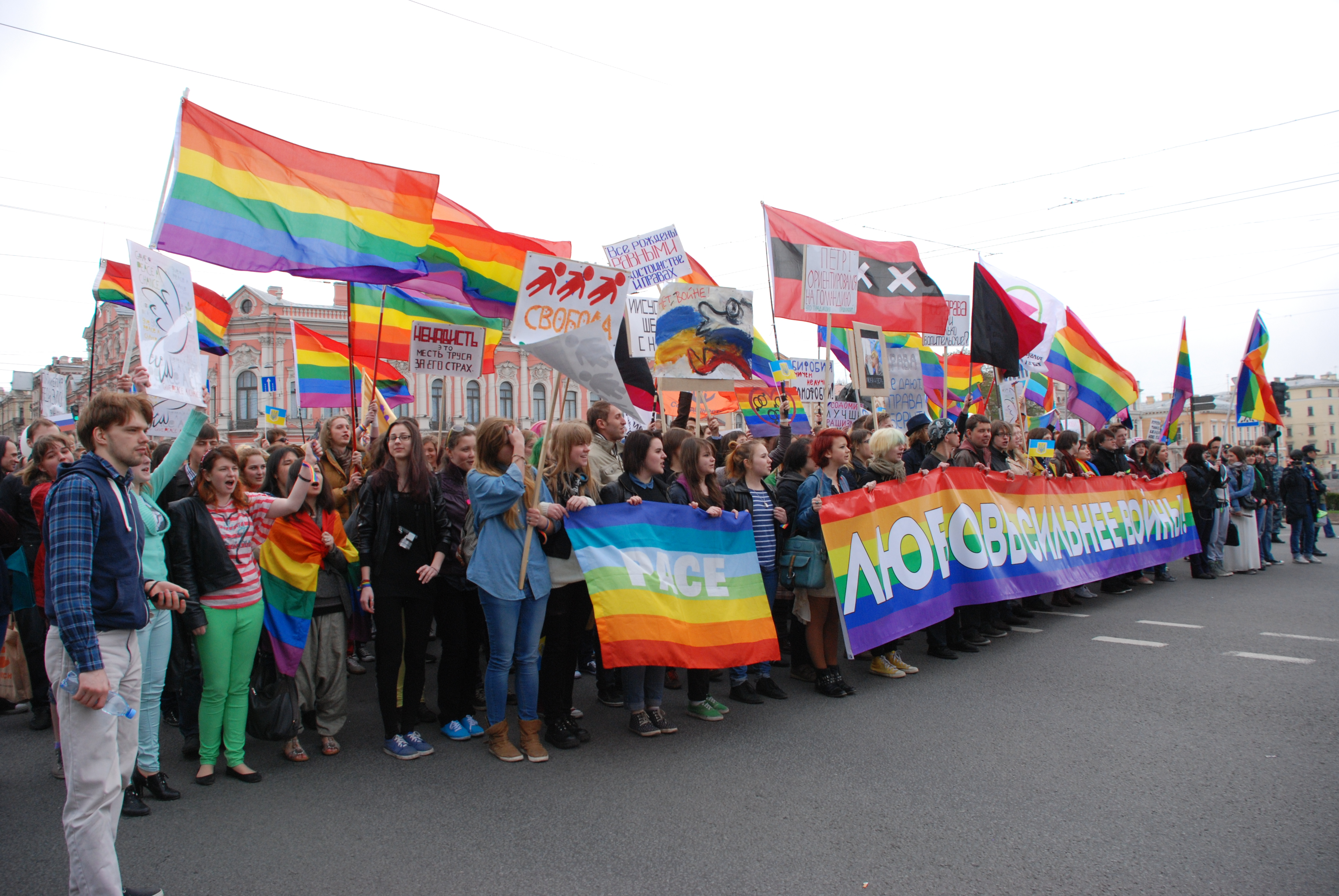
Rainbow May Day 2014

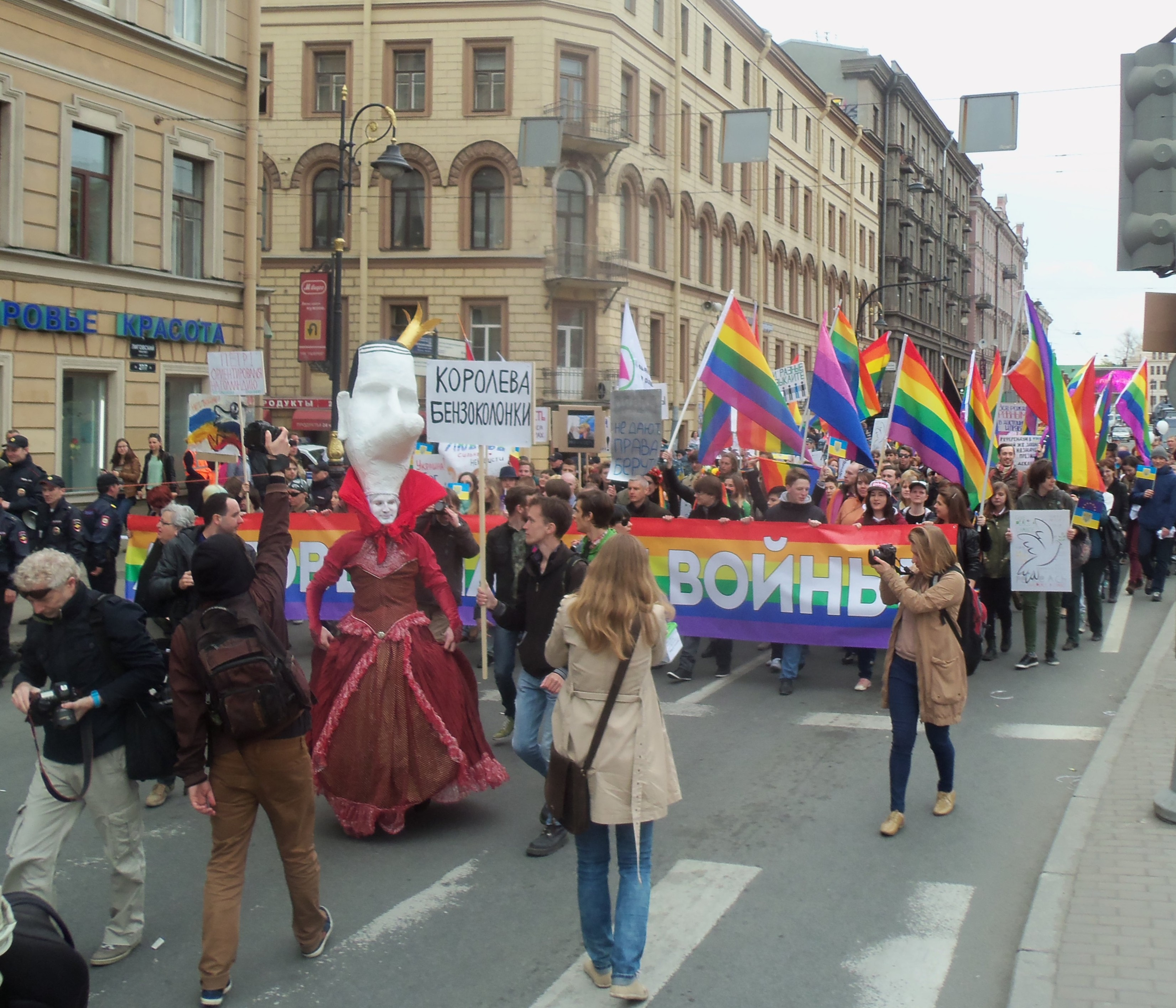
Rainbow May Day 2014

Petr Voskresensky was the organizer of the Rainbow May Day procession on Nevsky Prospekt in St. Petersburg. This event has been held annually since 2011. In 2012, Rainbow May Day ended with the detention of LGBT activists, including Voskresensky. In 2013, Voskresensky staged a performance during a march with a doll of homophobic politician Vitaly Milonov in a wedding dress. In 2014, he led a Rainbow May Day as the bloody gas station drag queen Vladimir Putin. It was a protest against Russia's invasion of Ukraine. The last gathering permitted by the Russian authorities took place on May 1, 2015 and became the largest LGBT event in Russia in history. A thousand people with rainbow flags marched on Nevsky Prospekt. This time for the procession Petr Voskresensky created a moulage of the Pink Tank, referring to the famous anti-militarist performance by Czech artist David Černý. In 2016, Rainbow May Day was banned and activists blocked traffic on Nevsky Prospekt at the Anichkov Bridge in protest. On May 1, 2017, in connection with the genocide of LGBT people in Chechnya, Petr Voskresensky again organized the blocking of this central avenue.

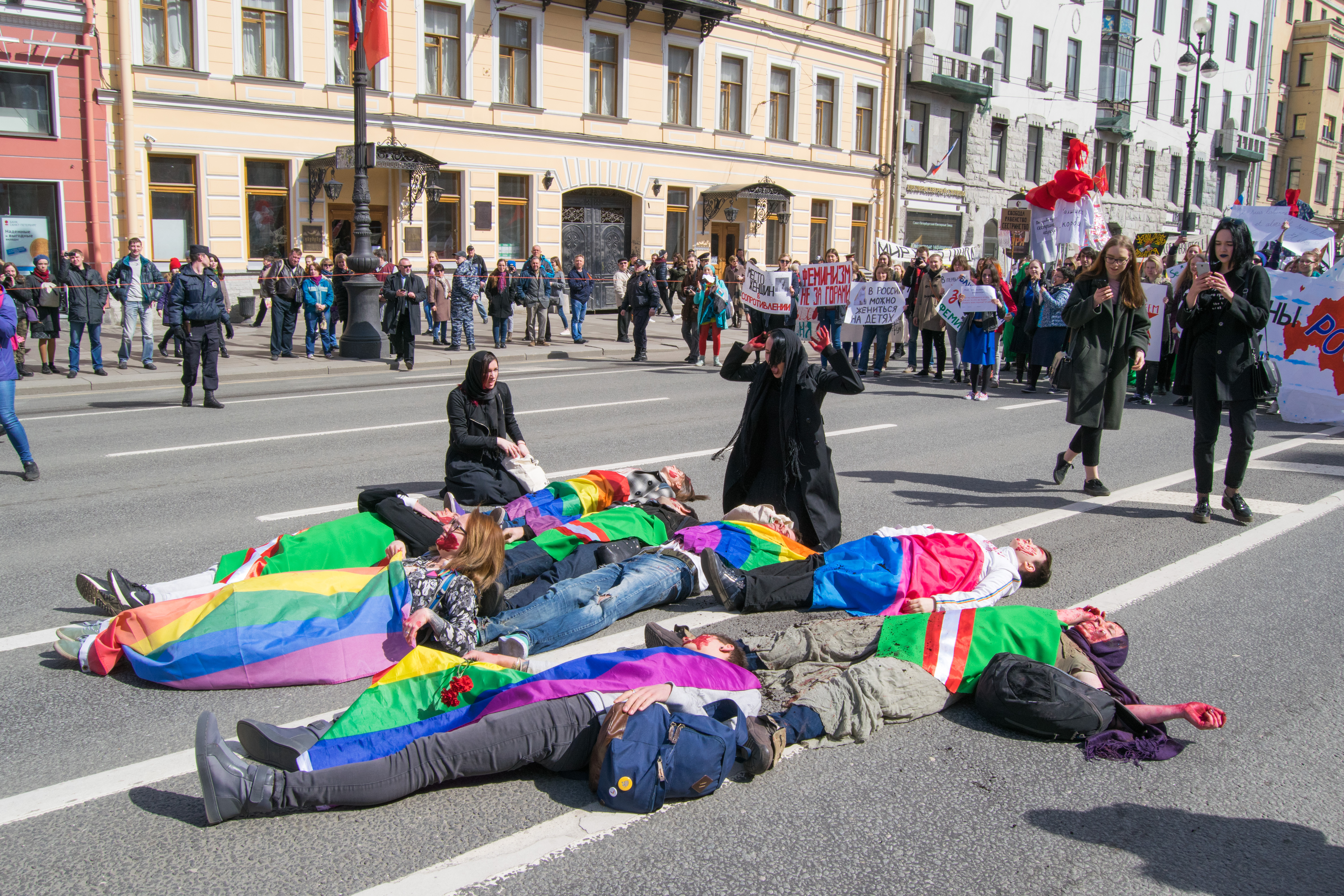
Street closures in 2017

In early 2017, Vyacheslav Makarov, the speaker of St. Petersburg's parliament, declared the LGBT movement to be the special forces of the Russian opposition. In response, activists, including Pyotr Voskresensky, staged an action, imagining what such warriors might look like. The action was a success. However, the police soon kidnapped Voskresensky from his home late at night. The police drew up a report on him about the uncoordinated action.

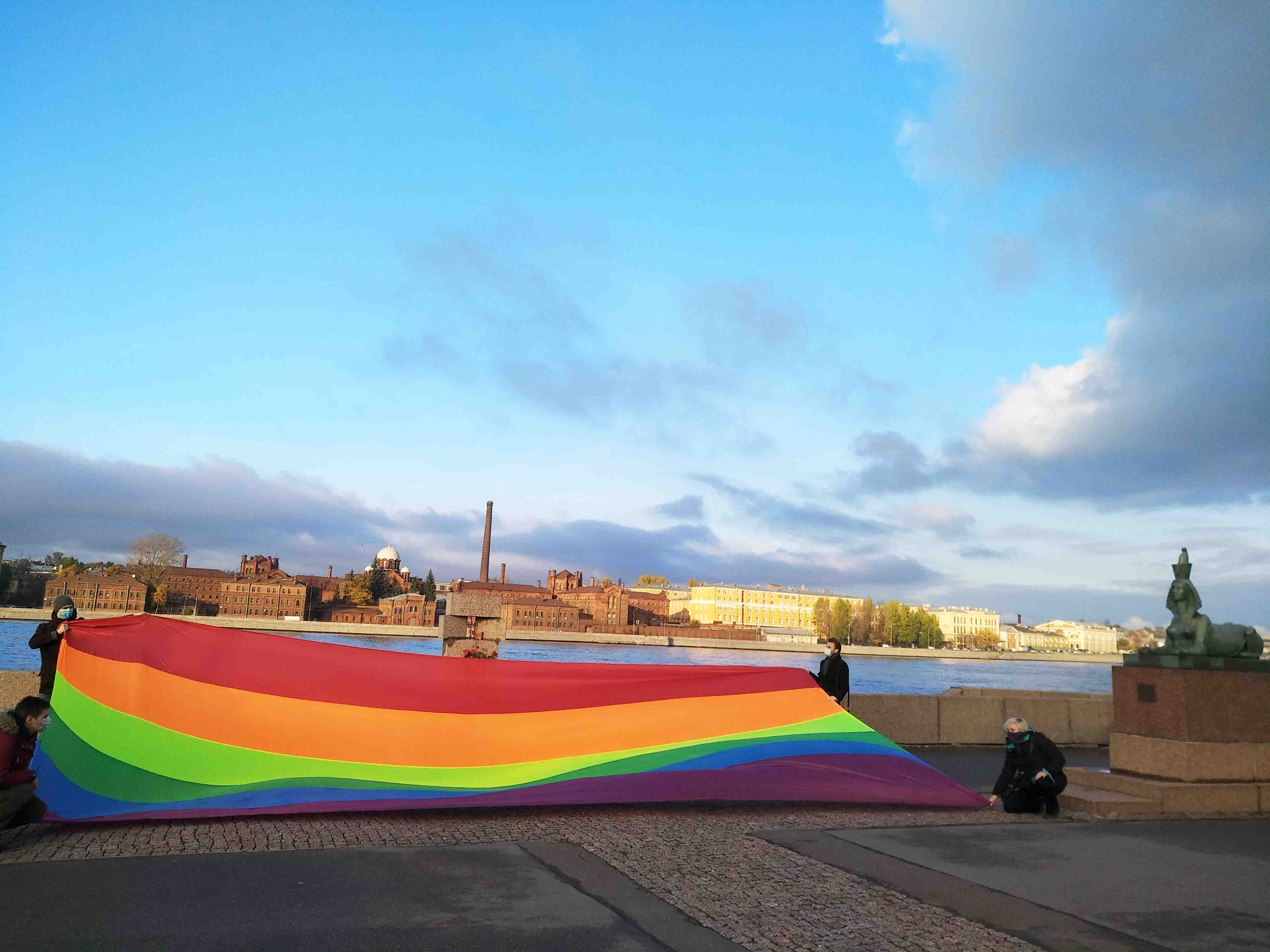
In 2020

In 2019, Petr Voskresensky organized a campaign against a chain of barbershops that banned entry for gays. During the campaign, he gave lectures about LGBT history and homophobia in front of the establishments for a week. As a result, the chain rescinded its rules for entry. In the fall of 2019, the well-known homophobic activist Timur Bulatov organized a campaign to harass Voskresensky. And soon the Federal Security Service attempted to recruit him.

On the Day of Remembrance of the Victims of Political Repressions in 2020, Voskresensky anonymously made his last action in Russia, unfurling a rainbow flag at the memorial to the victims of Soviet state terror opposite the Kresty Prison. The activists thus spoke out against the murders of gays in Chechnya, as well as the persecution of activists Yulia Tsvetkova in Khabarovsk and Alexander Merkulov in St. Petersburg.

Historical Queer Museum

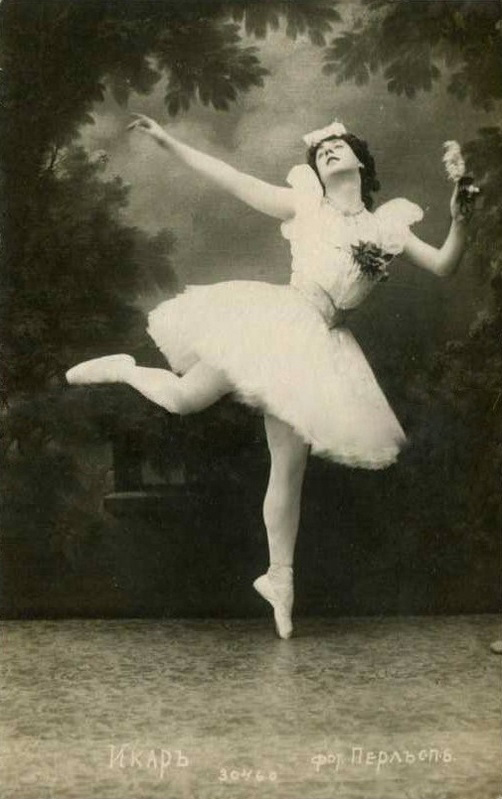
The first travesty ballet. 1910

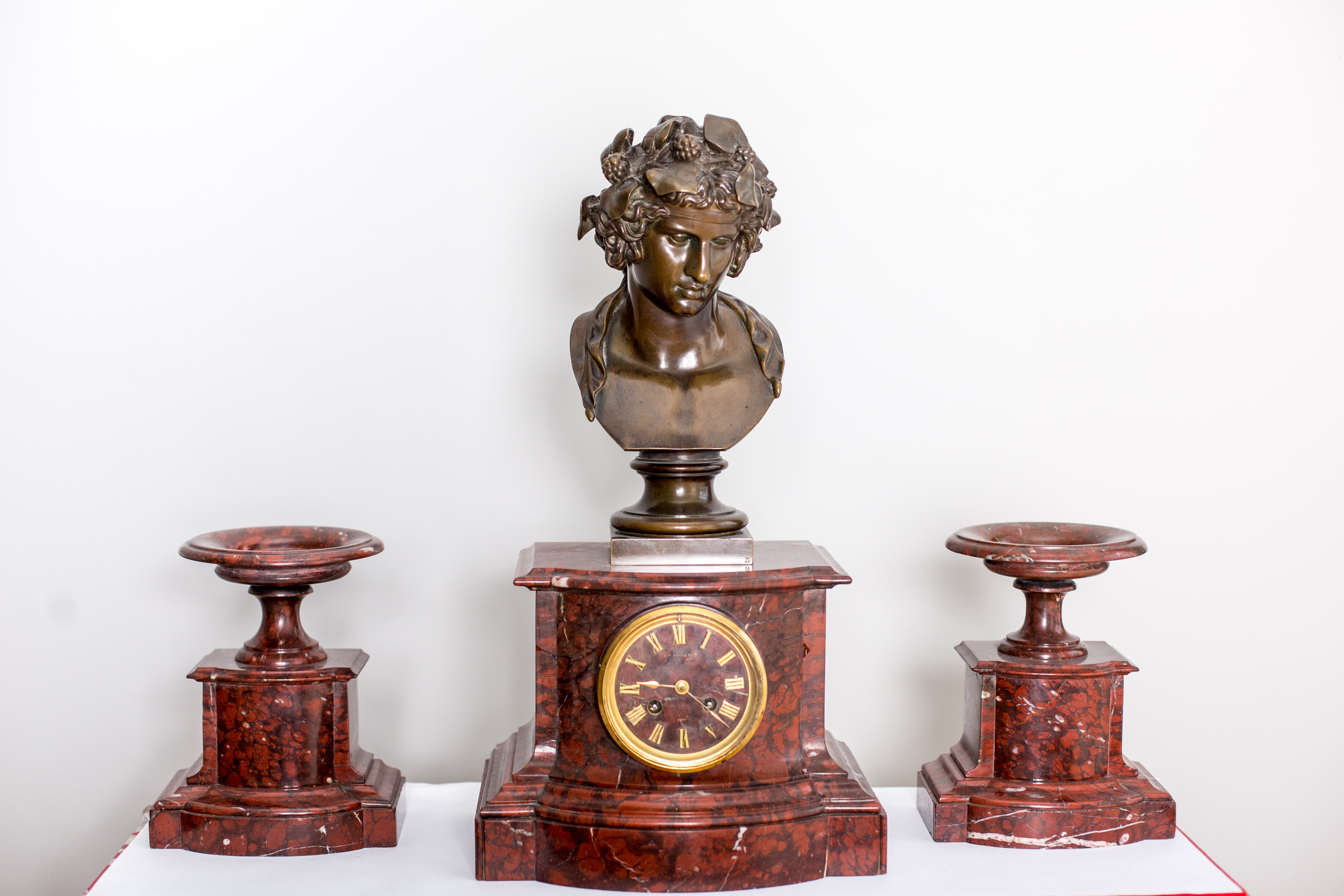
Antinous altar clock. 19th century

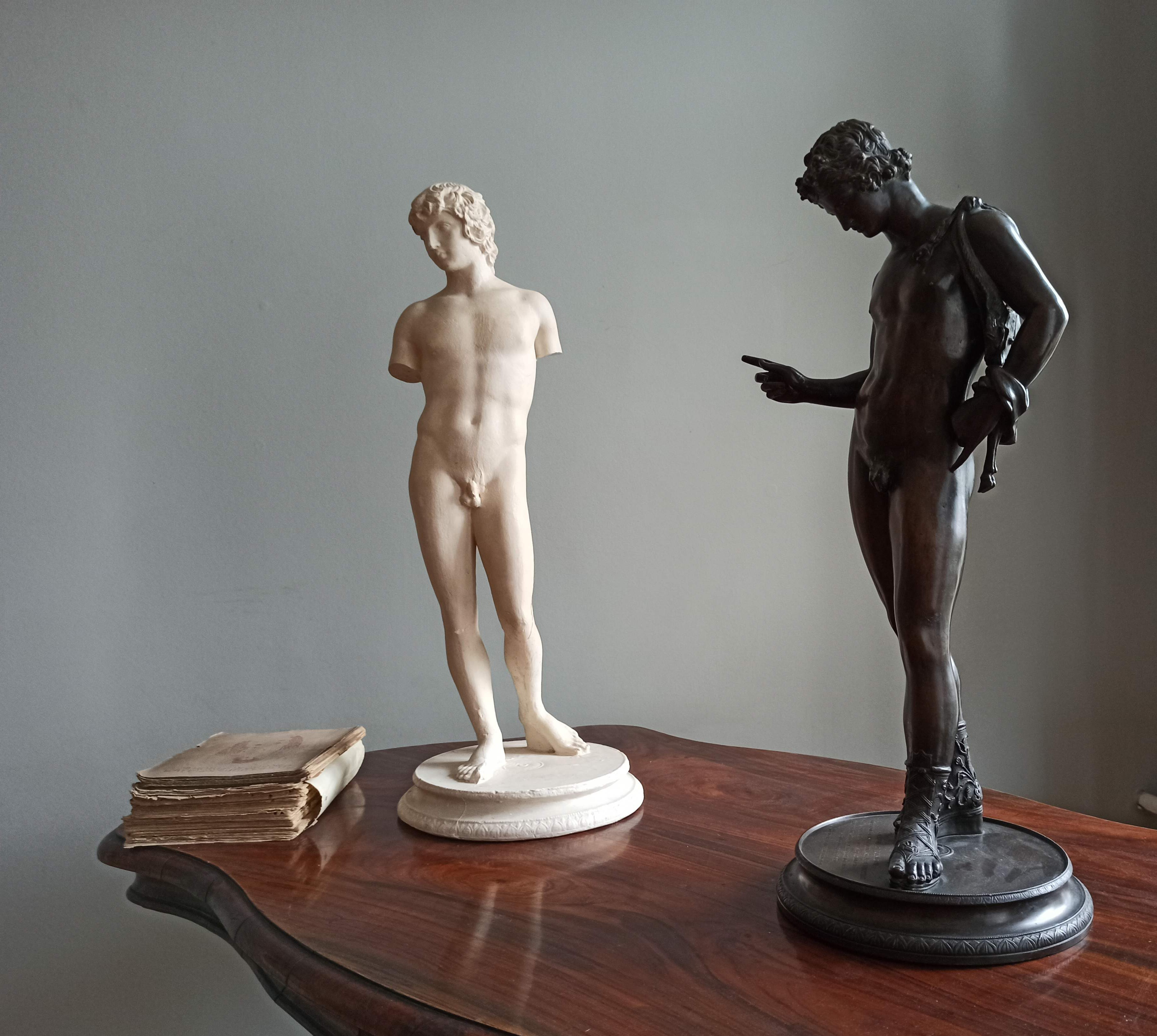
Antinous Farnese and Dionysus, called Narcissus. 19th century

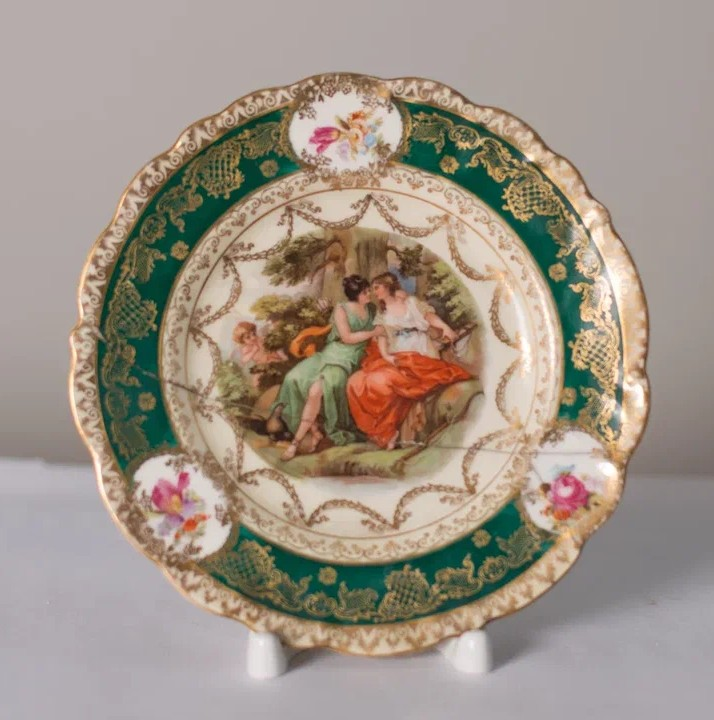
Diana and Callisto. 19th century porcelain

In the fall of 2022, Petr Voskresensky founded Russia's first Historical Queer Museum. The activist was inspired by a visit to the Tchaikovsky State House-Museum in Klin, where a queer interior was preserved in the study of the composer's brother Modest Tchaikovsky, who was also gay. The first exhibit of the collection was a statuette of Narcissus of Pompeii, seen by Petr Voskrksensky at the Tchaikovsky brothers' estate. In addition to it, the museum collection contains old books, statuettes, porcelain, photographs, cameos and other things.

The opening of the museum was scheduled for the summer of 2022. However, due to Russia's invasion of Ukraine, it became unsafe to hold such an event, and the activist canceled the planned event. But when in the fall of 2022 the Russian parliament began to adopt a new anti-LGBT law, Voskresensky could not hold back, because when this law would come into force, the very existence of the museum became illegal. On October 27, he opened his Queer Museum to the public. Hundreds of people visited the museum. But after the law was signed by the President of the Russian Federation on December 8, the museum was closed permanently. The collection was later evacuated to Finland.

In December 2022, Petr Voskresensky became one of the signatories of a petition by human rights activists in defense of the Moscow Helsinki Group, which is being liquidated by the Russian authorities.

In 2023, due to pressure from the Russian security services, Petr Voskresensky was forced to emigrate to Hamburg. Here he joined the Russian-speaking LGBT organization Quarteera and continued working on historical projects about queers. Here he and his co-authors wrote the brochures "Russian-speaking Queers in Berlin".

In 2023, Alla Manilova, the new director of the Russian Museum in St. Petersburg, disrupted the opening of an art retrospective exhibition by Timur Novikov and his New Academy. The official feared that the work of these artists often depicted homosexual motifs. In response, Petr Voskresensky made an outing to Manilova. After which the police came to his family home in search of his Queer Museum.

Petr Voskresensky has been a contributor to Russian Wikipedia since 2008. There he took part in the so-called "homo-wars", a years-long conflict between LGBT friendly and homophobic editors. He was indefinitely blocked twice in connection with this. Voskresensky eventually managed to establish a forced mediation procedure that lowered the heat. A number of his Wikipedia articles have been honored with awards: (Vera Gedroits, Edward II of England, Solovetsky Stone (Saint Petersburg), Last Address, Sandarmokh etc).

== Publications ==
- Воскресенский-Стеканов Петр (2022). Квир-каталог Эрмитажа (Queer catalog of Hermitage Museum) (in Russian). St. Petersburg: Coming out.
- Воскресенский-Стеканов Петр; Гутмахер, Тата; Ваня Кильбер (2023). Русскоязычные квиры в Берлине в XVIII - XXI веках (in Russian). Berlin: Quarteera.
