= Lieblingminne und Freundesliebe in der Weltliteratur =

German anthology of poetry about homosexuality

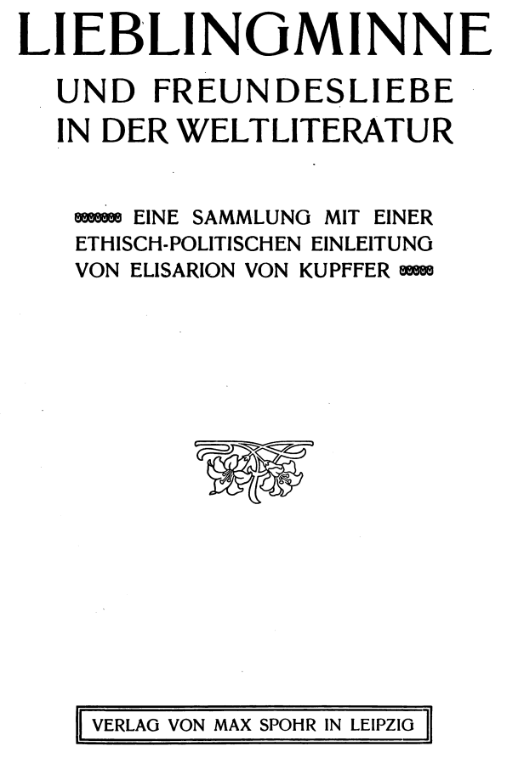
- Title page of Lieblingminne und Freundesliebe in der Weltliteratur (1900)
- Author: Elisar von Kupffer
- Language: German
- Subject: Homosexuality
- Publication date: 1900
- Publication place: Germany
- Media type: Print

Lieblingminne und Freundesliebe in der Weltliteratur is an anthology of poetry about homosexuality, compiled by the German artist Elisar von Kupffer (Elisarion) and first published in 1900.

== Poems ==
Poems in the book come from a variety of sources and places, like Ancient Greece, the Roman Empire, the Bible, the Arab world, Japan, Renaissance Italy, Elizabethan England, and 19th-century Germany, even including a few poems by the editor himself.

== Title ==
The title of the book uses an existing German word—Freundesliebe, "love between friends"—and a concoction by von Kupffer, Lieblingminne ("love of a favorite").

The word Minne, coming from medieval German times, usually denotes a form of heterosexual platonic love in which the lover sings praise of the beloved but does not make any concrete sexual advances.

== Von Kupffer's argumentation in the preface ==
The book includes a politically charged preface by von Kupffer, written in 1899 in Pompeii. In it, he argues in favor of a homosexuality that is not just "tolerated" by society but is an integral part of the social fabric, and with its (largely platonic) homosocial bonds between boys and men, as well as men and men, strengthens society in a way that heterosexual relationships on their own could never hope to do.

Von Kupffer also attacks the notion of a third sex, a concept he claims was invented by homosexual rights activists like Magnus Hirschfeld as a way to gain legal recognition for homosexuals and to repeal existing anti-sodomy laws. He is also strongly opposed to any revisionist history where historical figures like Alexander the Great or Julius Caesar are depicted as gays, when he feels the modern notion of "gay" hinges on a feminized, third-sex model of male behavior that he contends did not apply at the time.

Von Kupffer goes on to criticize the "cult of the woman", which he claims comes from imperial France and the court of Louis XIV. He states that a social climate in which males and females are primarily encouraged to form bonds and male–male bonding is watched with suspicion is detrimental to society. The promotion of heterosexuality above everything else can, by his account, only lead to a comparatively lonely society, where social interactions and culture on a larger scale (as in the Greek poleis) is mostly missing.

However, despite his argument that present-day men should, like the ideal Greek citizen of the past, be both decidedly masculine in their behavior but at the same time refined enough to entertain homoerotic or homosexual relationships, von Kupffer stresses that he is not a misogynist and that in fact, a lot of misogyny emanates from heterosexual men who subconsciously feel caged by their marriages.

== Publication history of the book ==
The book was published in an edition of 1,000 copies by Adolf Brand, an activist for the acceptance of male homosexuality, but already at the end of 1900, the remaining books were bought by the publisher S. Dyck in Eberswalde, which is shown by the ticket on Brand's name on the title page. In 1903, the book was taken over by the gay-friendly publisher Max Spohr, who exchanged Brand's title page for one bearing his own name. For a short time, the book was even banned by the courts, but it was later reinstated due to a favorable deposition by Ulrich von Wilamowitz-Moellendorff.

Only very few originals have survived the two world wars, and it is therefore difficult to find them in libraries. In 1995, the Berlin publishing house Verlag Rosa Winkel published a facsimile edition (somewhat reduced in page size in comparison to the original) of the book owned by the Staatliche Bibliothek Passau, with an introduction by Marita Keilson-Lauritz.

== See also ==
- Straton of Sardis
