= Eduard von Mayer =

German novelist and philosopher (1873–1960)

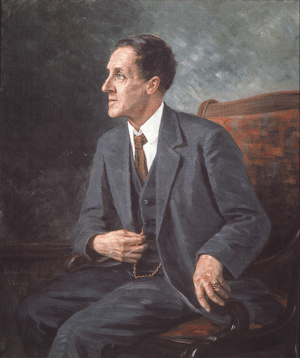
Eduard von Mayer, painting by Clara Wagner-Grosch

Eduard von Mayer (5 June 1873 – 26 December 1960) was a German-born Swiss writer, philosopher, critic, historian and art historian. He was the lifelong partner of the artist and writer Elisar von Kupffer and, together with him, developed Clarism, an artistic, philosophical and religious movement. Mayer was also an independent author on aesthetics, art history, philosophy and the natural sciences, and played a central role in promoting Clarism and administering the Sanctuarium Artis Elisarion in Minusio, Switzerland.

== Biography ==
=== Early Life ===
Eduard von Mayer was born in 1873 in Analowo, near Saint Petersburg, the son and seventh child of Charlotte von Mayer and Dr. Karl von Mayer, a physician and founder of the protestant hospital of Saint Petersburg. One of his older sisters was the author Sonia E. Howe. He also had an older sister, Jenny de Mayer, who was a Sister of the Russian Red Cross and Protestant missionary, as well as a sister, Dr. Charlotte Olivier (1864-1945), who specialized in the treatment of tuberculosis.

He was educated by theologians. As a child he could speak German, Russian and other foreign languages.

At 13 von Mayer fell in love with Elisabeth von Stackelberg, but the love was unrequited. By the age of 17 he was suicidal and developed a dislike of Christianity. In the summer of 1891 he met Elisàr von Kupffer. The meeting pushed von Mayer to pursue his interests in theatre and fine arts against his family wishes.

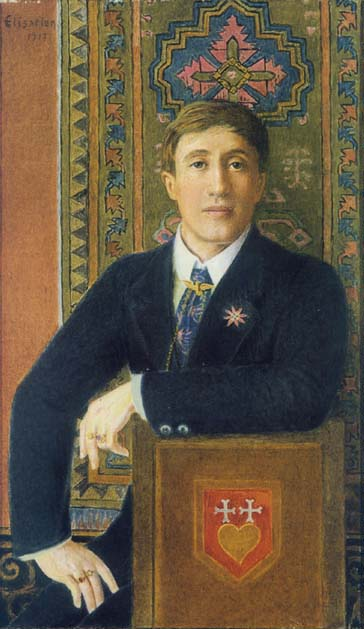
Elisàr von Kupffer

In 1894 von Mayer moved with his family to Lake Geneva and he continued his studies in Switzerland. This was also the time when his relationship with Elisabeth von Stackelberg ended and he tried to commit suicide.

=== Partnership with Elisàr von Kupffer and Clarism ===
In 1897 he graduated at Halle an der Saale with a dissertation on Schopenhauer's aesthetics. From 1897 onwards, his life coincided almost completely with that of von Kupffer. The authorship of the essay on Clarism such as "Was soll uns der Klarismus — eine menschliche und soziale Neugeburt" (What Can Clarism Give Us — A Human and Social Rebirth) and "Ein neuer Flug und eine heilige Burg" (A New Flight and a Holy Castle) is probably to assign to both von Kupffer and von Mayer.

In 1902 von Mayer published "Falsche Feuer" (False Fires), a critical approach towards German-Protestant Saint Petersburg, which had almost caused a break-up with his family.

Von Mayer published art historical works, like "Pompeji in seiner Kunst" (Pompeii as an Art City) and "Fürsten und Künstler — Zur Soziologie der Kunst in Berlin" (Rulers and Artists — The Sociology of Art in Berlin), both published in 1904.

Eduard von Mayer was the one behind the publicity effort for promoting the Clarism in renowned newspapers and magazines; he also gave lectures and showed slides.

=== Later Years ===
After von Kupffer's death in 1942, von Mayer devoted his time in documenting and securing their communal achievements. He catalogue more or less 2400 items: letters, sketches, drawings, plans, and paintings. He did also a "purging" of the homosexual aspect of his relationship with the other man: intimate correspondences between the two men, documented evidences of his contact with Magnus Hirschfeld, traces of the men's collaboration with "Der Eigene" (The Queer One or The Individualist), the first magazine for homosexuals; contributions in Hirschfeld's "Jahrbuch der sexuellen Zwischenstufen" (Yearbook of Sexual Inter-stages); even proofs for the authorship of "Das Mysterium der Geschlechter" (The Mystery of The Sexes), a Claristic theory of the sexes.

== Intellectual and literary career ==
Mayer's intellectual work ranged across philosophy, aesthetics, art history, cultural criticism, literature and the natural sciences. His academic career began with his doctoral dissertation, Schopenhauers Ästhetik und ihr Verhältnis zu den ästhetischen Lehren Kants und Schellings (Schopenhauer's Aesthetics and its Relationship to the Aesthetic Theories of Kant and Schelling), completed at the University of Halle in 1897.

His early literary work included Die Bücher Kains vom ewigen Leben, published in 1899, followed in 1902 by the two-volume novel Falsche Feuer. Ein Roman aus dem deutschen St. Petersburg (False Fires: A Novel from German St Petersburg). The latter drew critically on the German Protestant milieu of Saint Petersburg in which Mayer had grown up and reportedly caused considerable tension within his family.

During the first decade of the twentieth century, Mayer increasingly concentrated on aesthetics, cultural history and art criticism. His Pompeji in seiner Kunst (1904) examined the artistic culture of ancient Pompeii, while Die Lebensgesetze der Kultur (1904) presented a broader theory of cultural development. These were followed by Technik und Kultur (1906), Die Seele Tizians (1906), Modernes Mittelalter (1906), and Fürsten und Künstler. Zur Soziologie der Kunst (1907), in which he explored relationships between artistic production, patronage and social structures.

Mayer also collaborated closely with Elisàr von Kupffer in publishing and cultural criticism. In 1907 the two edited Lebenswerte, a series of illustrated ethical essays. Their intellectual collaboration subsequently became increasingly associated with the development of Clarism. The precise authorship of some of the movement's programmatic writings remains uncertain, since Mayer deliberately subordinated his own contribution to Kupffer's and later described his philosophical development as deriving from Elisarion's ideas.

During this period Mayer developed a philosophical system influenced by contemporary discussions in physics, biology and metaphysics. He proposed the concept of Aktiden, conceived as individual centres of living force, and opposed Nietzsche's "will to power" with what he termed the "will to action" (Wille zur Tat). His writings increasingly questioned the sufficiency of conventional scientific methods for understanding reality and sought to combine philosophical speculation, natural science and Clarist metaphysics.

These ideas culminated in his major philosophical work, Die Zukunft der Natur (The Future of Nature). Its first two parts, Die Irrgänge des Geistes and Die Verjüngung des Lebens, appeared in 1914, while the third part, Die befreite Menschheit, was published in 1920. In the work Mayer developed a metaphysical account of nature and human development that became an important theoretical component of Clarism. A fourth part, Volk und Persönlichkeit, written as a social and political extension of the earlier volumes, was published posthumously in 1944.

Mayer continued to publish on philosophy, cultural criticism and sexuality. Kant und die gefesselte Wissenschaft (1909) attacked what he regarded as the restrictive consequences of Kantian philosophy, while Die Goethelüge (1912) criticised contemporary appropriations of Goethe, particularly by monist thinkers. In Das Mysterium der Geschlechter (1923), Mayer addressed theories of sex and gender in response to contemporary sexology, including the intermediate-sex theories associated with Magnus Hirschfeld. The work attempted to reconcile questions of sexuality and androgyny with the metaphysical principles of Clarism.

His later publications included the poetry collection Aus einem Leben (1927) and scientific and philosophical articles, including work on the geometry and mechanics of spiral motion published by the Ticino Society of Natural Sciences in 1932. Even after his literary activity became increasingly devoted to Clarism and the Elisarion, Mayer continued to regard himself as an independent philosophical thinker, although he repeatedly presented his mature system as inseparable from the intellectual partnership he had formed with Kupffer.

=== Views on race and Judaism ===
Mayer's philosophical writings also incorporated contemporary racist theories and antisemitic stereotypes. In Die Zukunft der Natur, he discussed humanity in terms of races of unequal value and developed a Clarist theory of "racial rejuvenation" (Rasseverjüngung), while also advocating forms of eugenic regulation.

His discussion of Judaism combined criticism of racial nationalism with anti-Jewish economic and racial stereotypes. In the chapter "Der Sinaiglaube", Mayer characterised Jews as an extraterritorial "racial state" bound together by blood and economic interests, and associated Jewish influence with money and the wider capitalist order. In "Die Rassegefahr", he attributed what he called the "deepest victory of Judaism" to its influence over other social groups and associated Judaism with the "spirit of Mammon". At the same time, Mayer explicitly denied that Clarism was "anti-Jewish" or "antisemitic".

Mayer also presented Zionism through this framework. Rather than regarding the creation of a territorial Jewish state as ending what he perceived as Jewish transnational power, he suggested that a Zionist state would constitute only a religious centre within a wider, world-spanning Jewish power structure. These claims closely resembled contemporary forms of economic and conspiratorial antisemitism that associated Jews collectively with finance, transnational influence and control over economic life.

There was nevertheless a significant contradiction within Mayer's racial thought. He criticised contemporary racial nationalism and explicitly declared that Clarism was "not anti-Jewish" and "not antisemitic". At the same time, in the same discussion he referred to the "deepest victory of Judaism", associated Judaism with the "spirit of Mammon", and continued to describe Jews as a biologically and economically cohesive racial group. Modern accounts of Clarism consequently identify antisemitic tendencies within the movement despite its founders' rejection of the label.

== Personal life ==
=== Elisabeth von Stackelberg ===
At the age of thirteen, Mayer became emotionally attached to Elisabeth von Stackelberg, whom he met during a summer stay near Reval. The relationship remained largely idealised and unfulfilled; according to later biographical accounts, he continued to regard Stackelberg as the object of an intense romantic attachment despite prolonged periods of separation. He later regarded the experience as important to the development of his ideas about personality and individual existence.

The eventual end of his attachment to Stackelberg coincided with a period of severe emotional and religious crisis. While studying in Switzerland in the mid-1890s, Mayer learned that she had become engaged to another man. Together with his increasingly pessimistic engagement with Schopenhauer's philosophy and his longstanding conflict with the pietistic Christianity of his upbringing, the loss contributed to a crisis that culminated in a suicide attempt.

=== Partnership with Elisàr von Kupffer ===
Mayer first met Elisàr von Kupffer on 15 August 1891 at his family's summer residence near Levashovo, outside Saint Petersburg. Both men were at the time emotionally attached to women: Mayer to Elisabeth von Stackelberg and Kupffer to Agnes von Hoyningen-Huene. Kupffer later emphasised that their relationship therefore did not begin as an immediate romantic attachment. He described their shared intellectual, literary and artistic interests as the basis of an emotional bond that gradually became central to both men's lives.

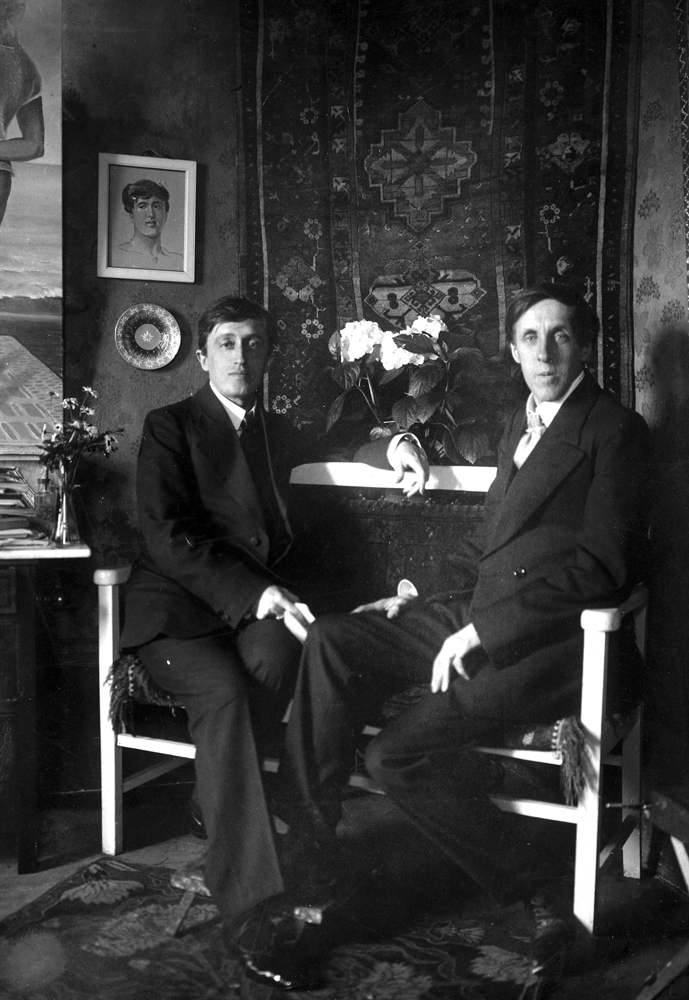
Elisar von Kupffer and Eduard von Mayer in 1930s

Their periods of separation during the early 1890s were accompanied by an increasingly intimate correspondence. Mayer's emotional crisis and suicide attempt in the mid-1890s deeply affected Kupffer. In 1895, the two moved together to Berlin, where they shared accommodation and continued their studies. After Mayer completed his doctorate at Halle in June 1897, they began permanently sharing their lives and subsequently travelled together through Italy and other parts of Europe.

Mayer and Kupffer remained partners for more than four decades. Their relationship combined domestic life with a close intellectual and artistic collaboration: they travelled together, shared residences, jointly developed Clarism, founded publishing and religious organisations, and eventually created the Sanctuarium Artis Elisarion at Minusio. The Getty Research Institute identifies Mayer and Kupffer as significant others.

Kupffer's autobiography presents their relationship in deliberately idealised terms. Looking back in 1941, fifty years after their first meeting, he described the intellectual and emotional bond formed between them as something that had connected them throughout their lives. Although Kupffer rejected contemporary medical classifications of homosexuality and developed his own theories of sexuality and male friendship, his partnership with Mayer has subsequently been discussed within histories of homosexuality and queer culture.

Their household occasionally included other people who became emotionally or artistically important to Kupffer. In Berlin, the adolescent Adolf Schmitz became closely associated with the couple, while in Italy the young Luigi "Gino" Taricco lived with them for several years and became one of Kupffer's principal artistic models. These relationships did not displace Mayer's position as Kupffer's permanent partner and principal intellectual collaborator.

After leaving Italy during the First World War, Mayer and Kupffer settled in Ticino and became Swiss citizens in 1922. From 1923, Rita Fenacci became a close friend and housekeeper to the two men and remained part of their household for decades. Kupffer died at Minusio in 1942. Mayer survived him by eighteen years and devoted much of his remaining life to preserving, cataloguing and administering their shared artistic and intellectual legacy.
