= Harry Oosterhuis =

Harry Oosterhuis (born 1958) is a historian and lecturer at Maastricht University.

== Works ==
- Oosterhuis, Harry (2000). Stepchildren of Nature: Krafft-Ebing, Psychiatry, and the Making of Sexual Identity. University of Chicago Press. ISBN 978-0-226-63059-5.
- Oosterhuis, H.; Gijswijt-Hofstra, M. (2008). Verward van geest en ander ongerief: Psychiatrie en geestelijke gezondheidszorg in Nederland (1870-2005) (in Dutch). Bohn Stafleu van Loghum. ISBN 978-90-313-5238-8.
- Oosterhuis, Harry (2012). "Sexual Modernity in the Works of Richard von Krafft-Ebing and Albert Moll". Medical History. 56 (2): 133–155. doi:10.1017/mdh.2011.30. PMC 3381524. PMID 23002290.
