= Levashovo =

Levashovo may refer to:

- Levashovo, Saint Petersburg, a municipal settlement in Vyborgsky District of Saint Petersburg, Russia
  - Levashovo (air base)
  - Levashovo Memorial Cemetery
- Levashovo, Vladimir Oblast, a rural locality (village) in Vladimir Oblast, Russia
- Levashovo, name of several other rural localities in Russia
