= Tieke (disambiguation) =

Tieke, or saddlebacks, are two species of New Zealand bird of the family Callaeidae.

Tieke may also refer to:

- Tieke Kāinga, a small Māori community in New Zealand
- Anna Tieke (1898–1938), a German communist
