= Levashovo Memorial Cemetery =

Cemetery in Saint Petersburg, Russia

Levashovo Memorial Cemetery Левашовское мемориальное кладбище
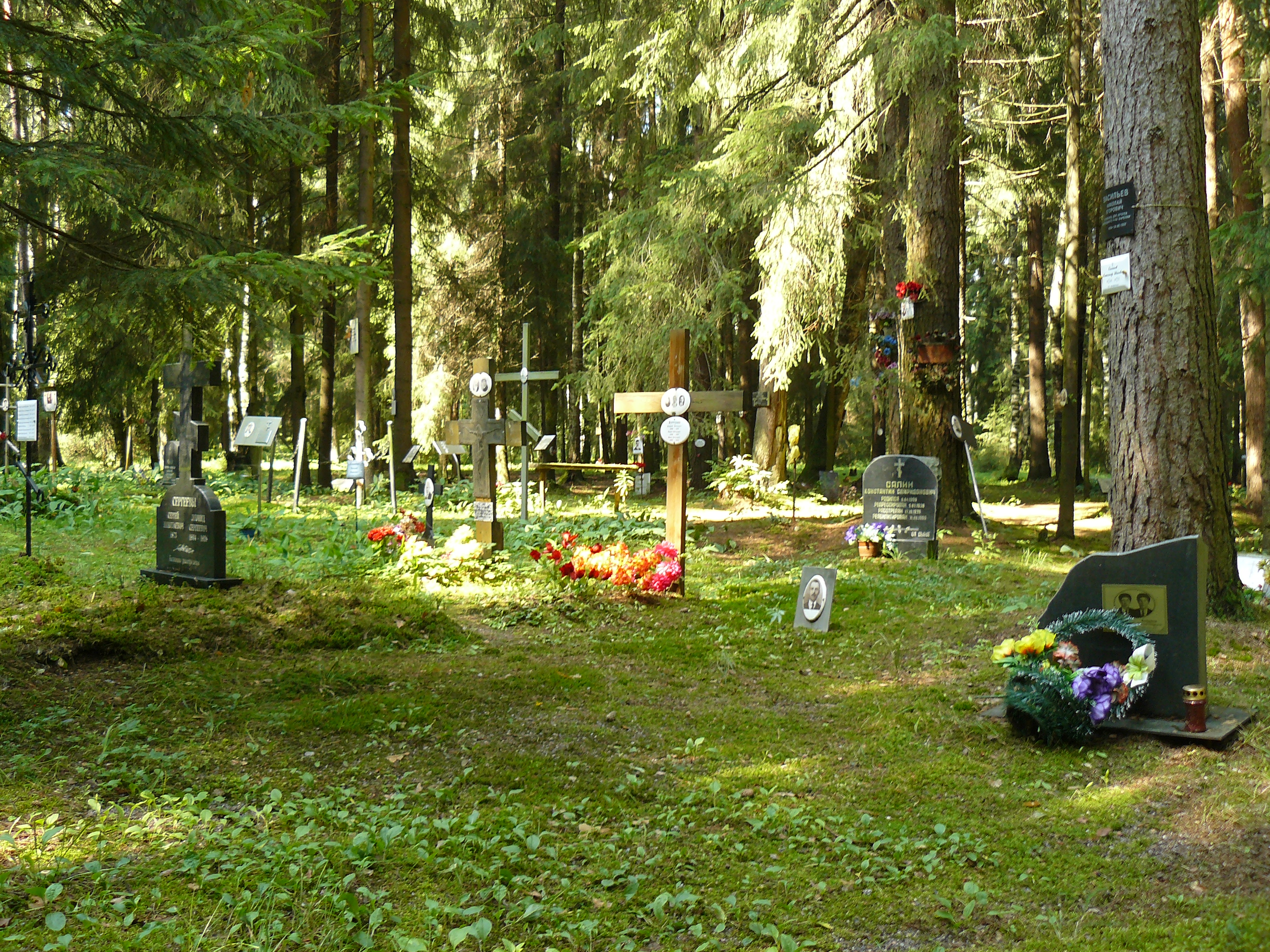
- View of the cemetery
- Interactive map of Levashovo Memorial Cemetery; Левашовское мемориальное кладбище

Details
- Location: Levashovo, Saint Petersburg
- Country: Russia
- Coordinates: 60°05′38″N 30°11′26″E
- Website: Official website
- Find a Grave: Levashovo Memorial Cemetery; Левашовское мемориальное кладбище

Levashovo Memorial Cemetery (Russian: Левашовское мемориальное кладбище) commemorates the victims of political repression between 1937 and 1954: some were shot, others died in the city's prisons, all were buried here in unmarked graves. Archival evidence suggests that 19,540 bodies lie here, 8,000 of whom were shot or died during the Great Terror. The cemetery is located near the railway station at Levashovo, Saint Petersburg, in an empty area referred to in Russian as the Levashovskaya Pustosh (Russian: Левашовская пустошь), the Levashovo Wasteland.

Bodies dating back to the Terror were first found there in spring 1989 by a Memorial (society) exploration group led by V.T. Muravsky. The FSB, successor to the NKVD and KGB, finally handed the area over to the city council in 1990.

== Monuments, memorials and plaques ==
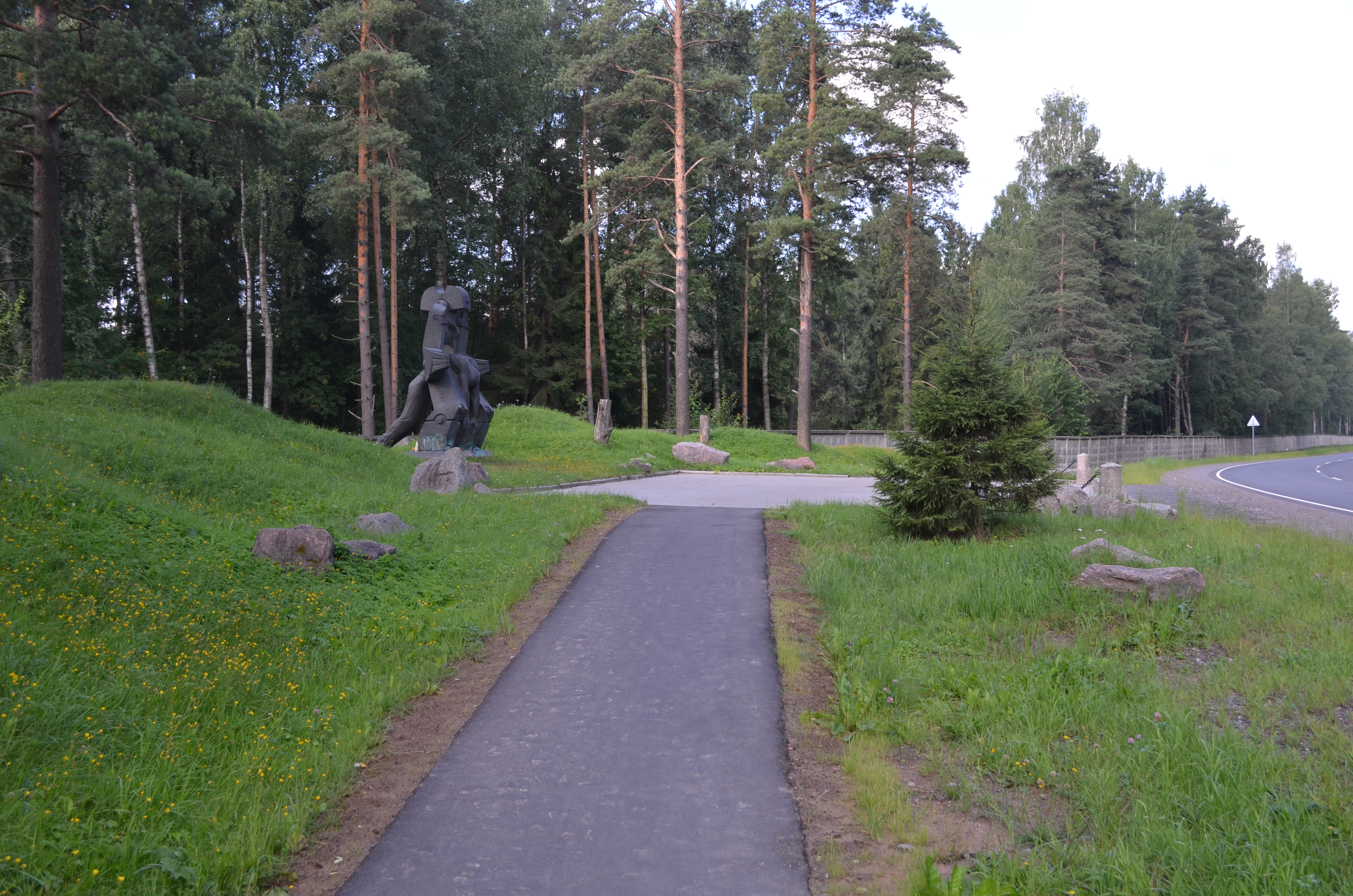
"Moloch of Totalitarianism"

Many collective memorials to particular ethno-confessional groups have been added in the grounds of the cemetery since 1990 and the large monument of the "Moloch of Totalitarianism" (sculptors Nina Galitskaia and Vitaly Gambarov) was erected by the entrance in 1996. A memorial to Italians who died in the Soviet Gulag was added to the site (Gallery No. 8) in 2007. Other memorials were enacted for a range of groups, including Jews, Norwegians, Assyrians, Seventh-day Adventists, and the deaf.

By established tradition, relatives or descendants of the victims also began adding their own personal memorials or plaques. By 2017 more than 1,300 of them (Gallery No. 12) were distributed around the 6.5 hectares (16 acres) of the site. They were symbolic acts of remembrance: the actual location of any particular body was not known and impossible to determine.

== Annual events ==
Various annual events are held at the cemetery. On 25 January or the nearest Sunday in January or February, the "Feast of Russia's New Martyrs and Confessors" is celebrated by the St Petersburg Metropolitan of the Russian Orthodox Church.

In June solemn ceremonies are held in Remembrance of the Victims of Political Repression.

On 30 October each year, the Day of Remembrance of the Victims of Political Repressions, commemorative events are organized at the cemetery by the Memorial society and other NGOs. In 2016 the event was attended by NGOs, city officials, diplomats, foreign delegations, representatives of various ethno-confessional groups and relatives and descendants of the victims.

== Buried at Levashovo ==
Some of those known to have died or been executed in the city's prisons before and after the Second World War are listed below. Nikolai Alekseevich Voznesensky, for instance, was sentenced to death in 1950 as the leader of the so-called Leningrad plot. Others like the writers Livshits and Kornilov, or the German communists Rudolf and Anna Tieke, were victims of the Great Terror (1937–1938).

- Igor Akulov
- Evgeny Henkin
- Boris Kornilov
- Alexey Kuznetsov
- Benedikt Livshits
- Nikolai Aleksandrovich Nevsky
- Nikolay Oleynikov
- Mikhail Rodionov
- Julian Shchutsky
- Kirill Stutzka
- Anna and Rudolf Tieke
- Nikolai Alekseevich Voznesensky

== Gallery ==
Memorials at Levashovo

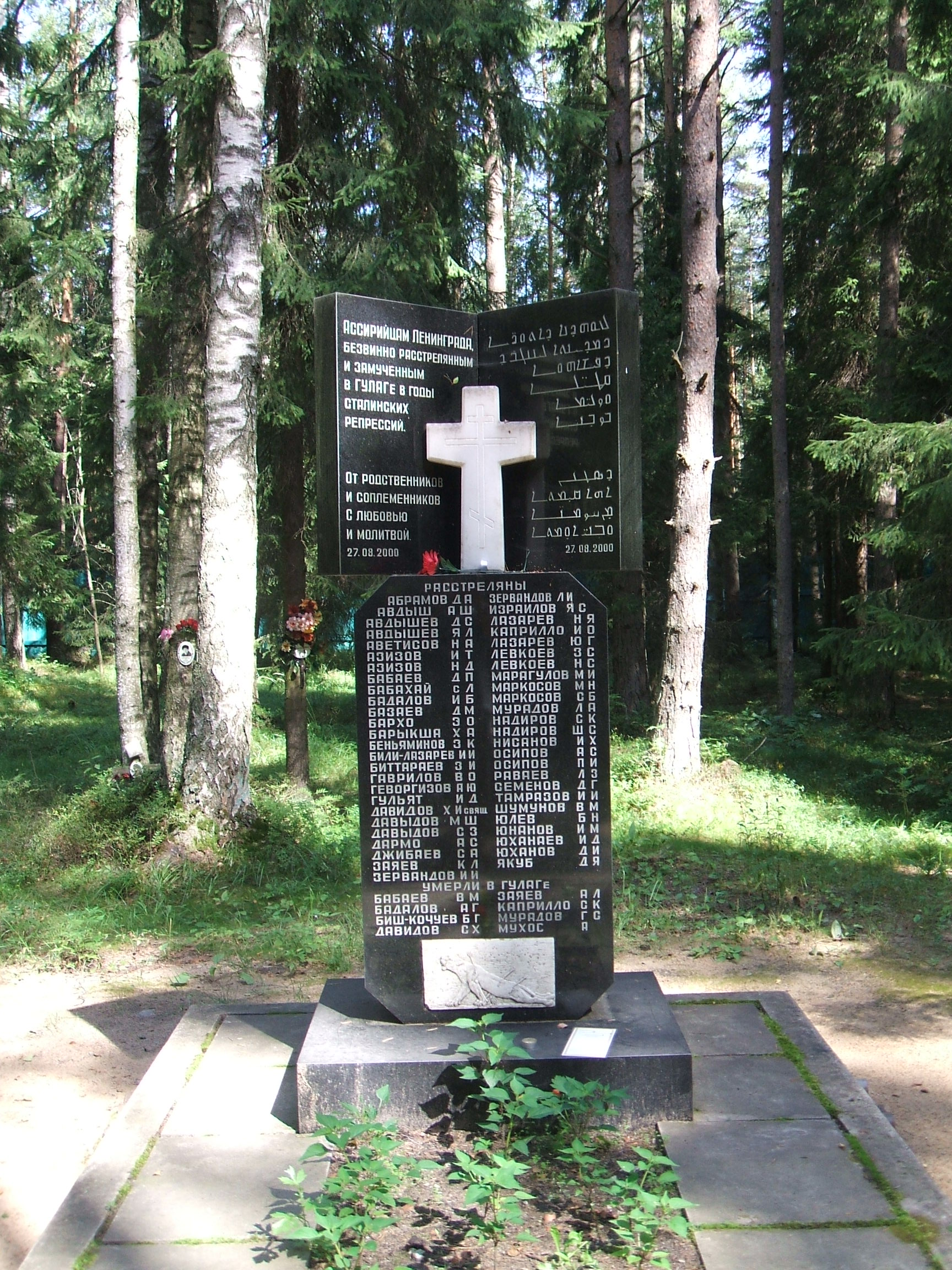
1. To Assyrians

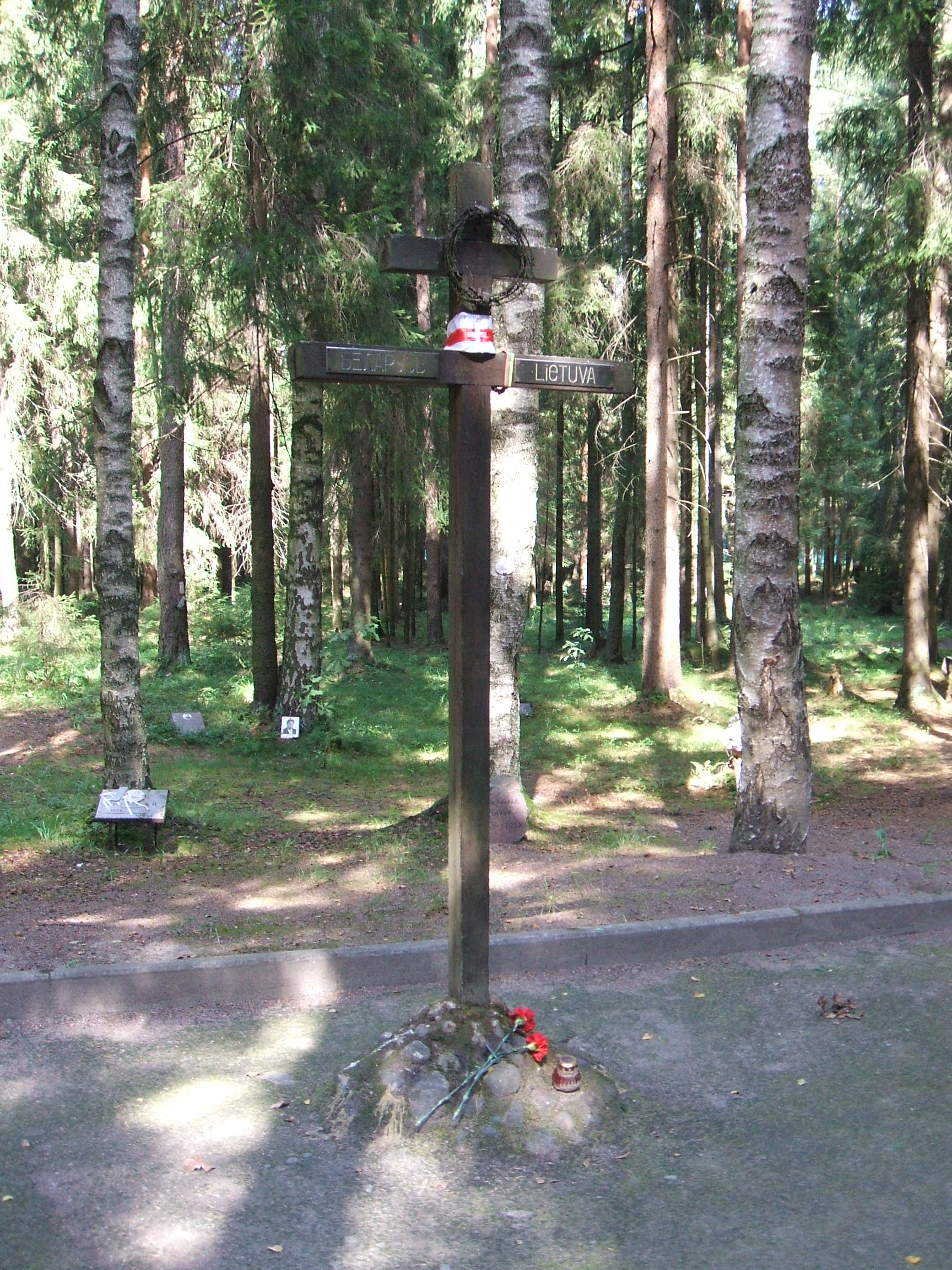
2. To Belarusians

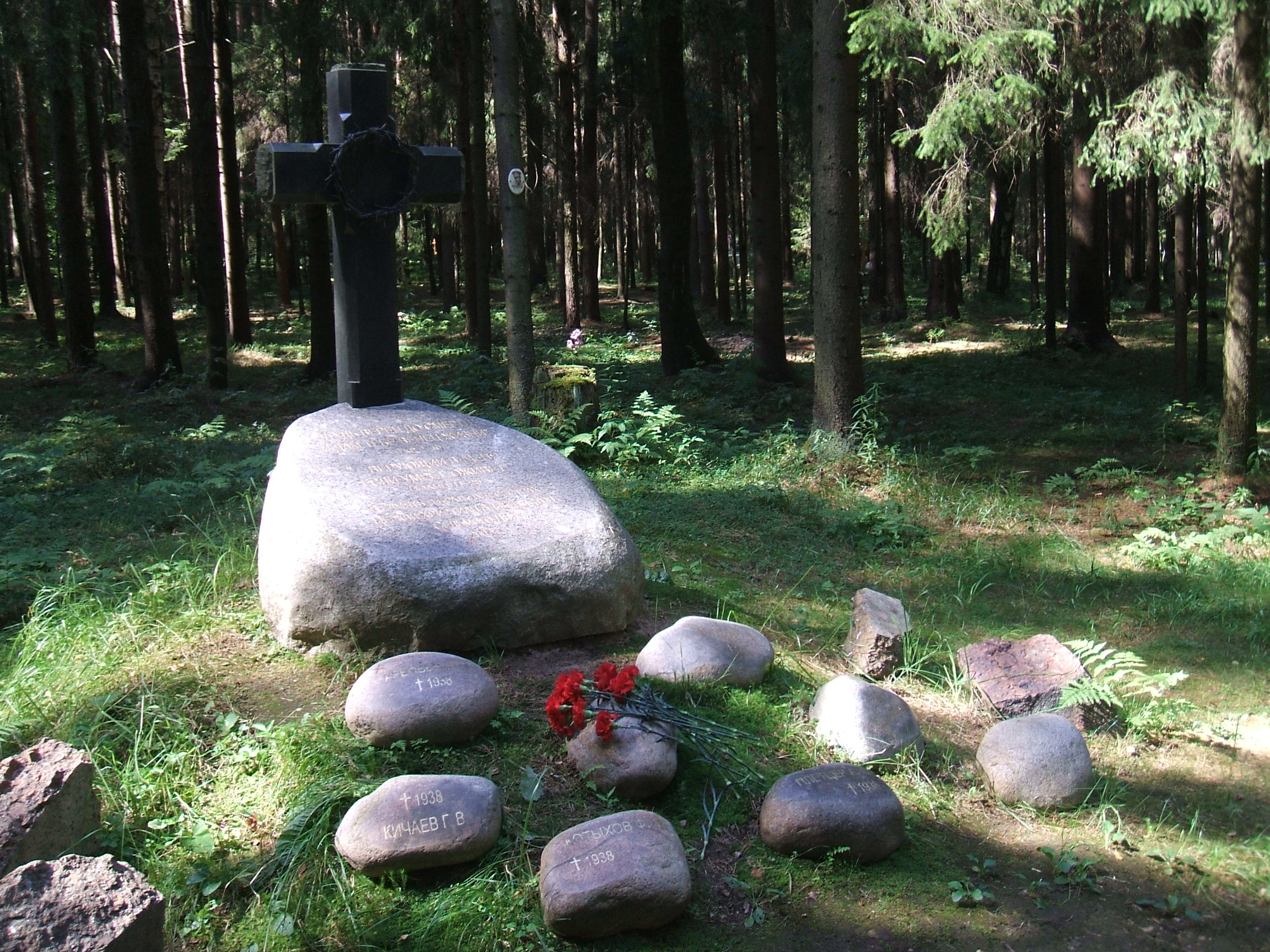
3. To Orthodox believers

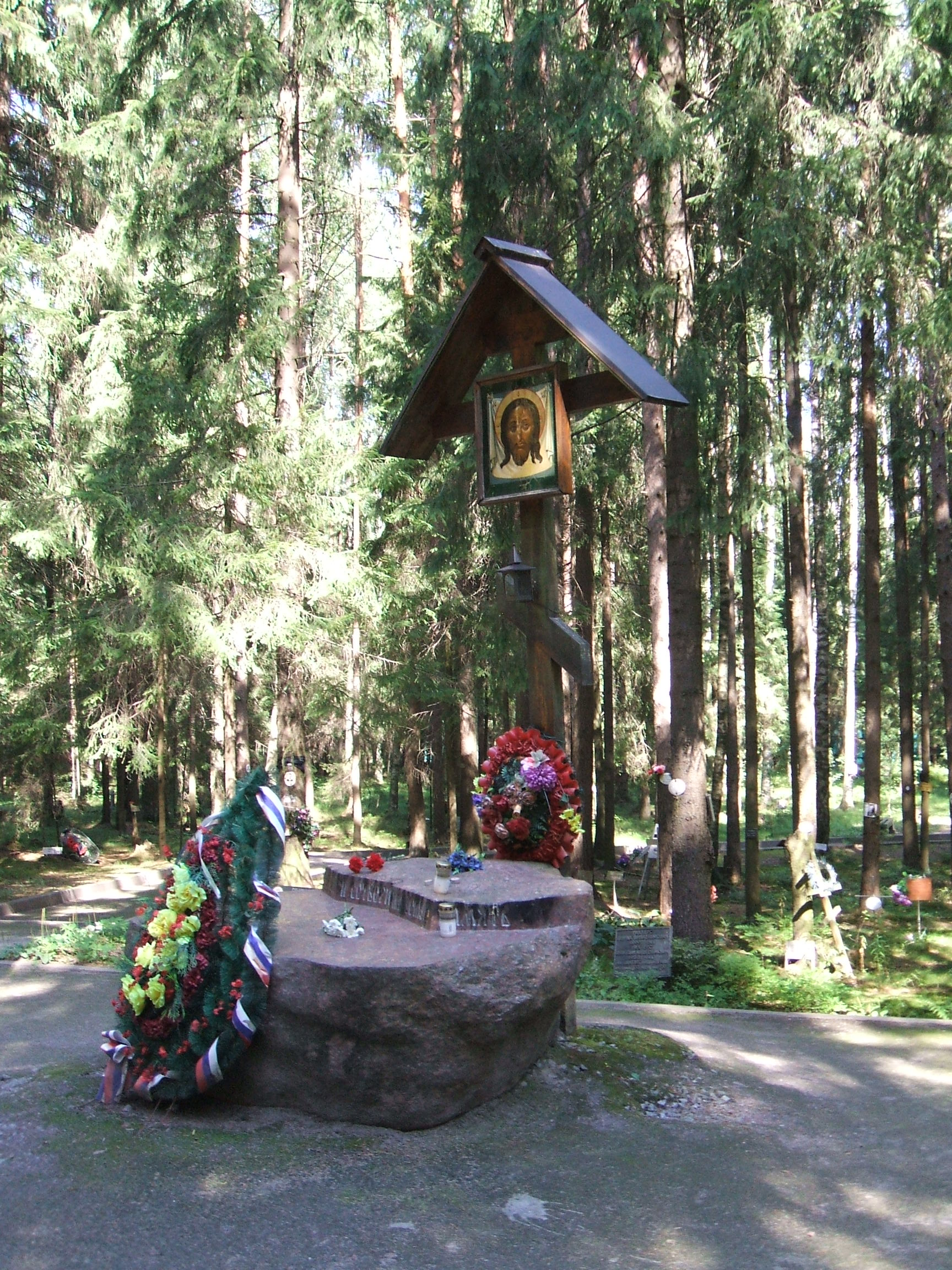
4. Never forget

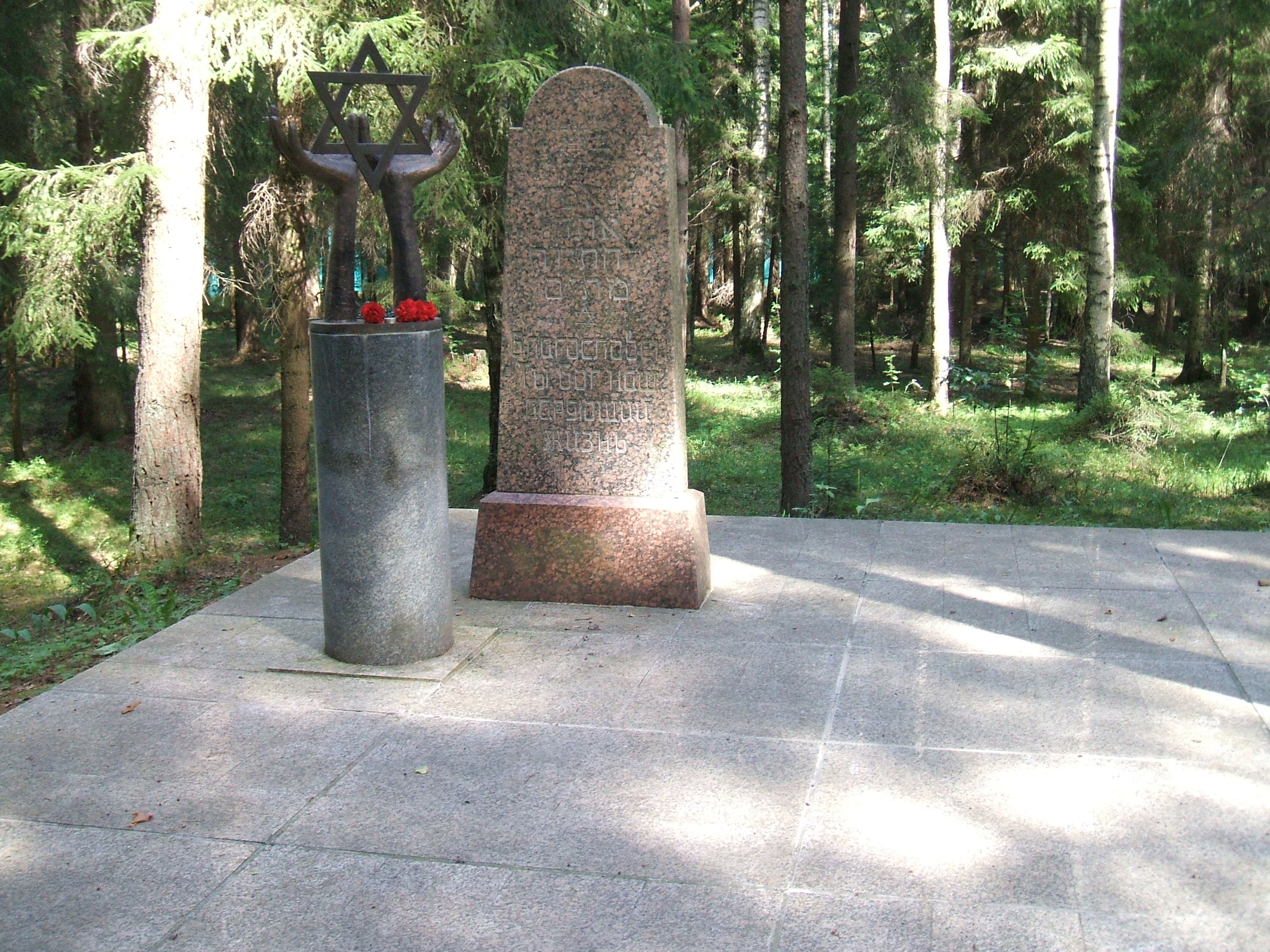
5. To Jews

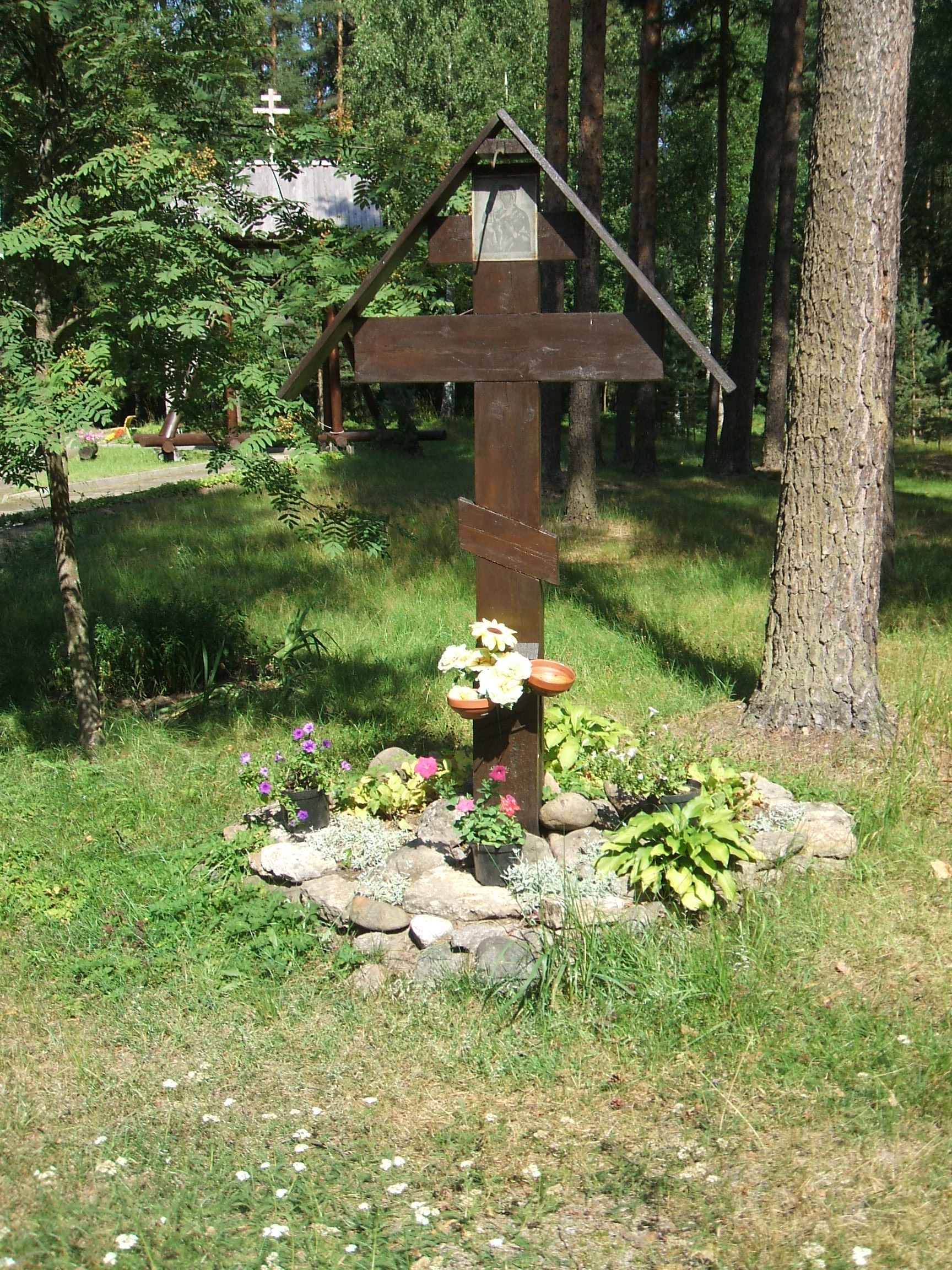
7. Confession

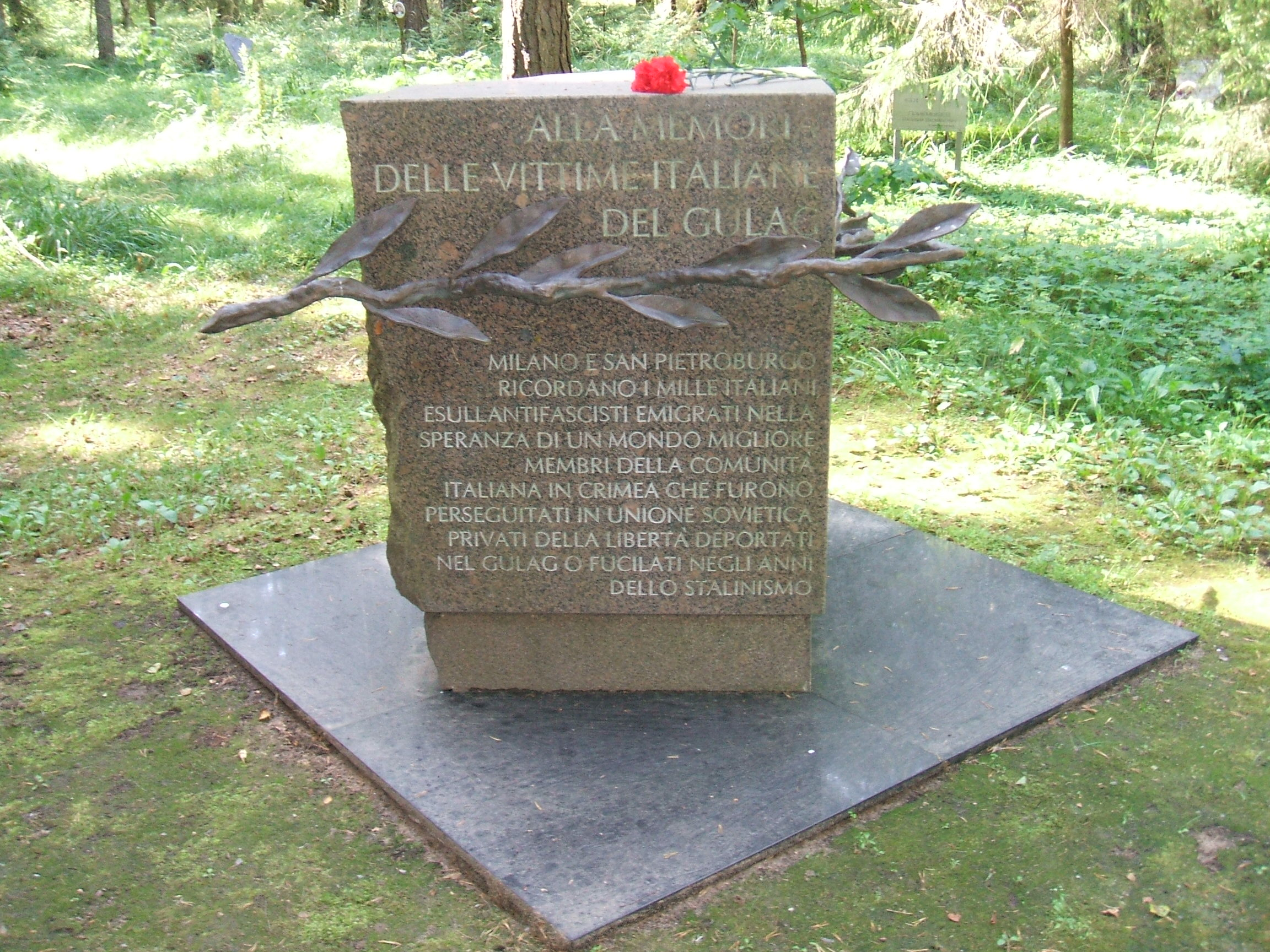
8. To Italians

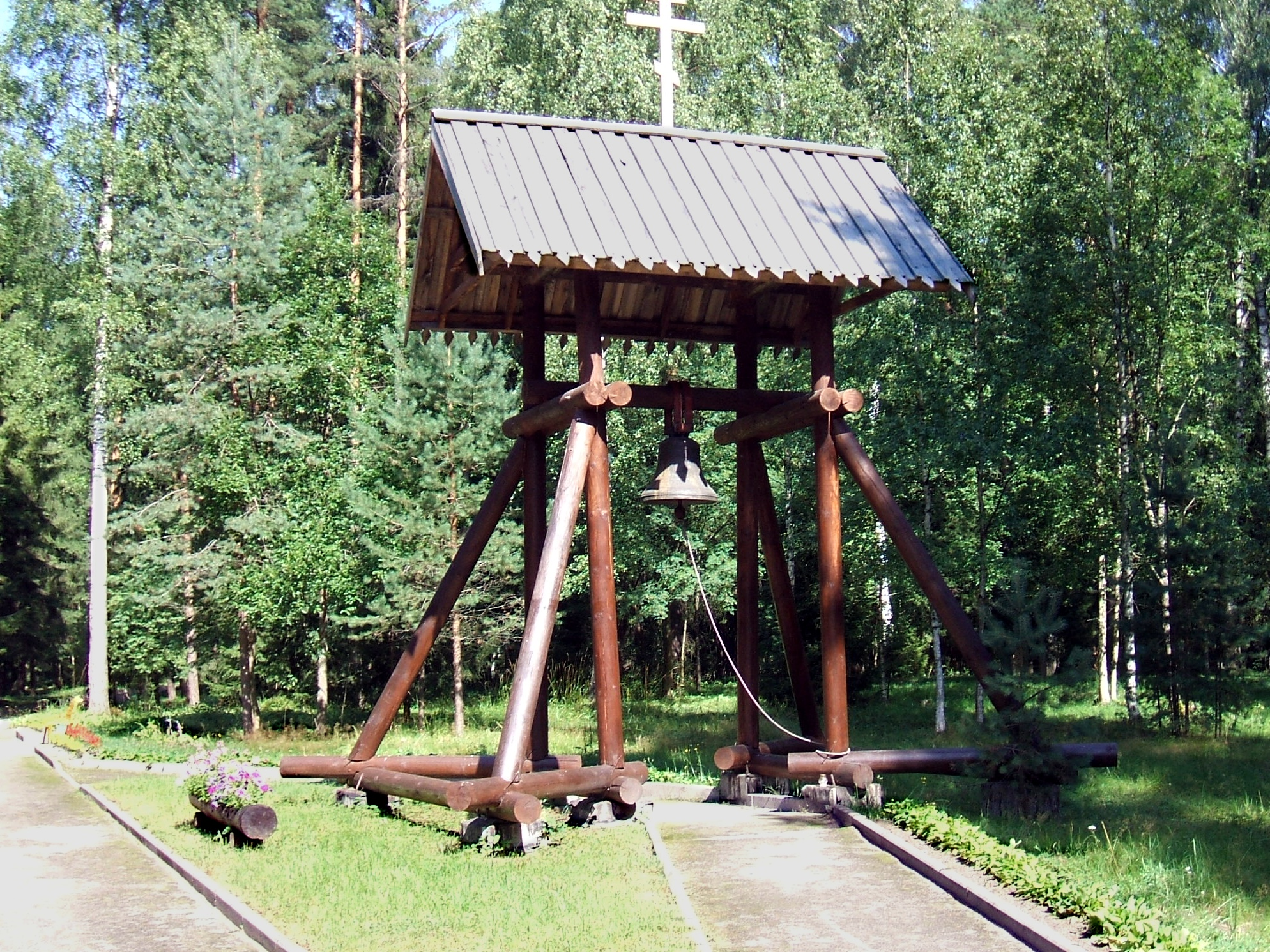
9. The Bell of Memory

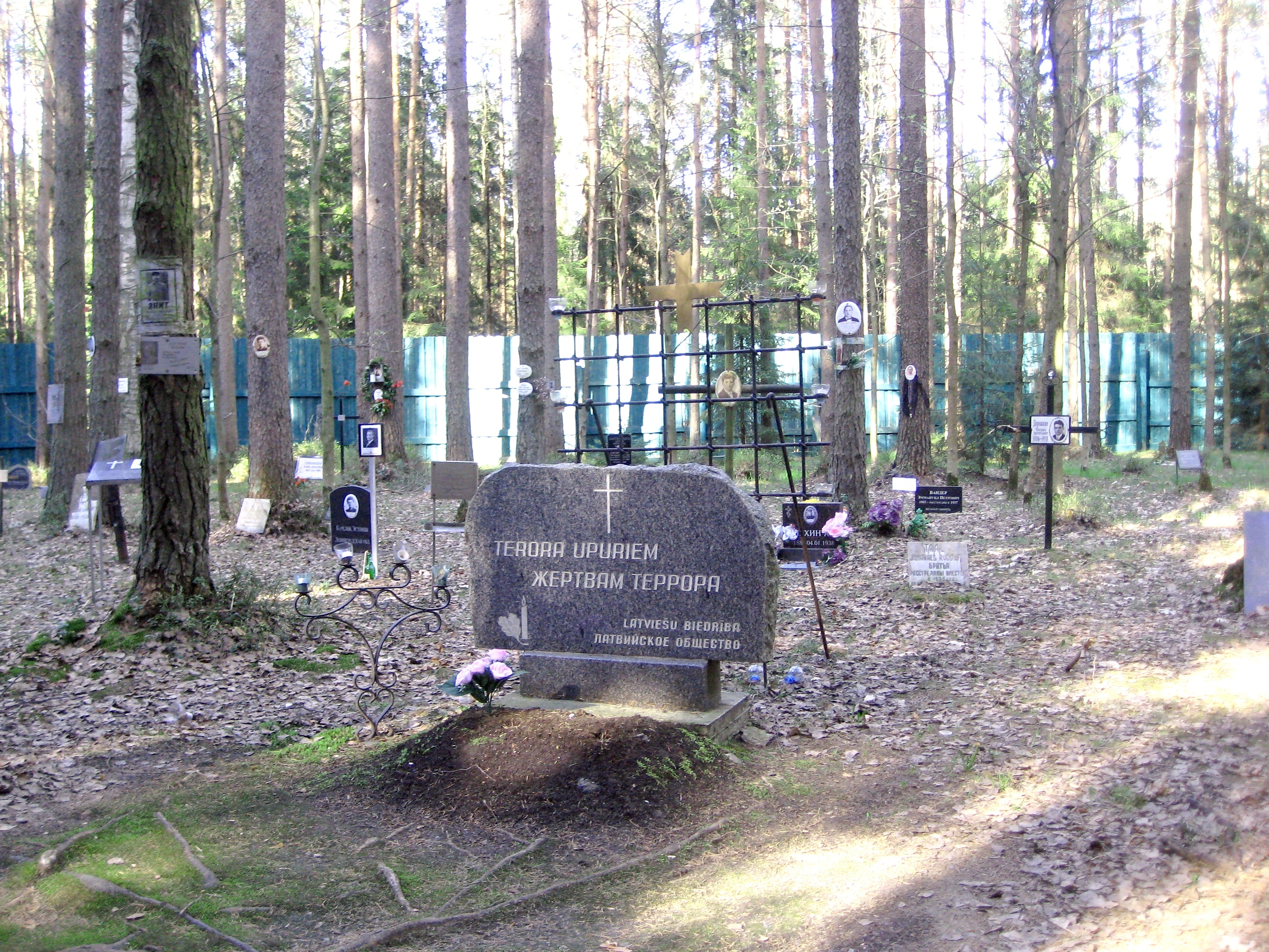
10. To Latvians

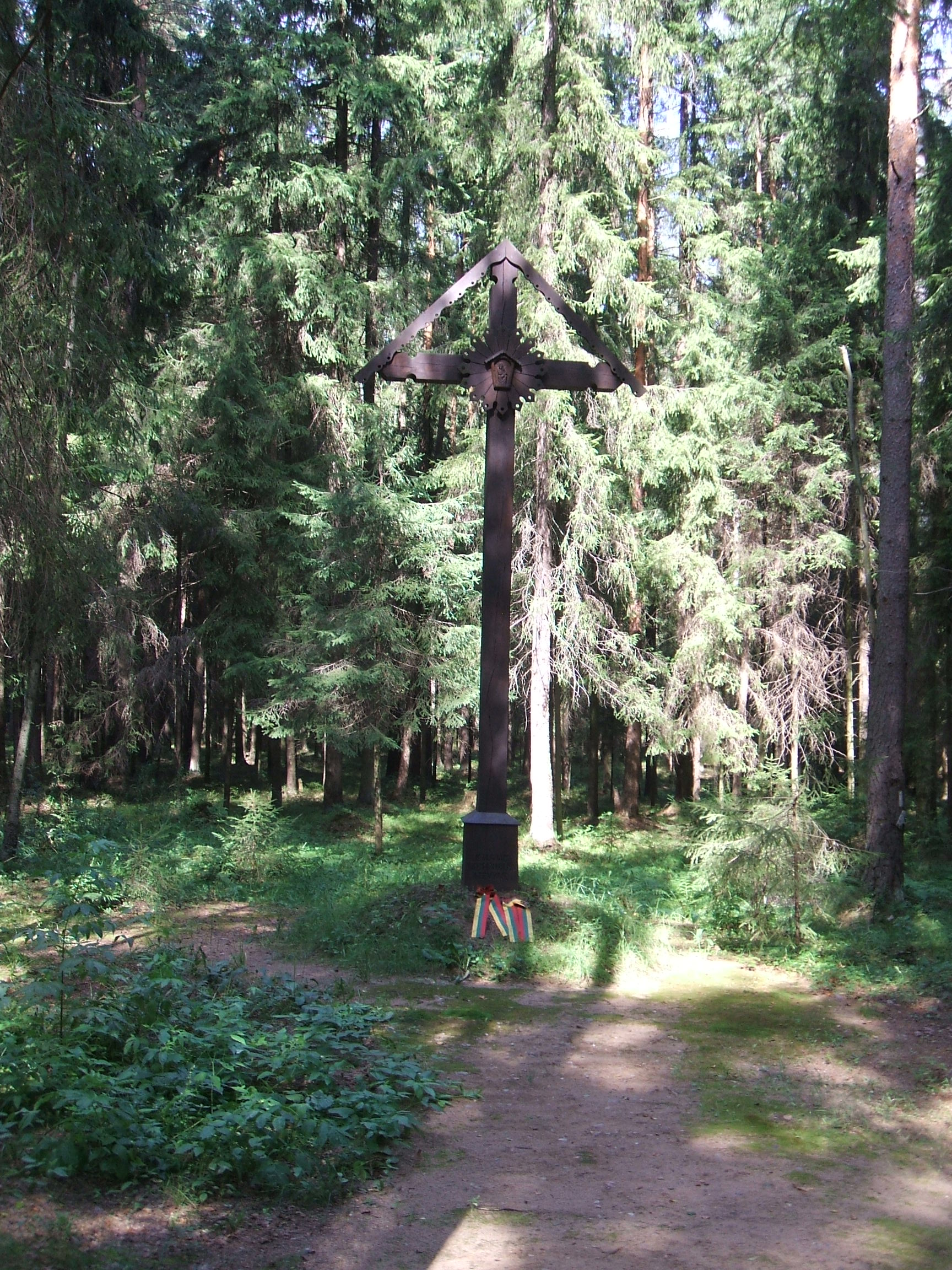
11. To Lithuanians

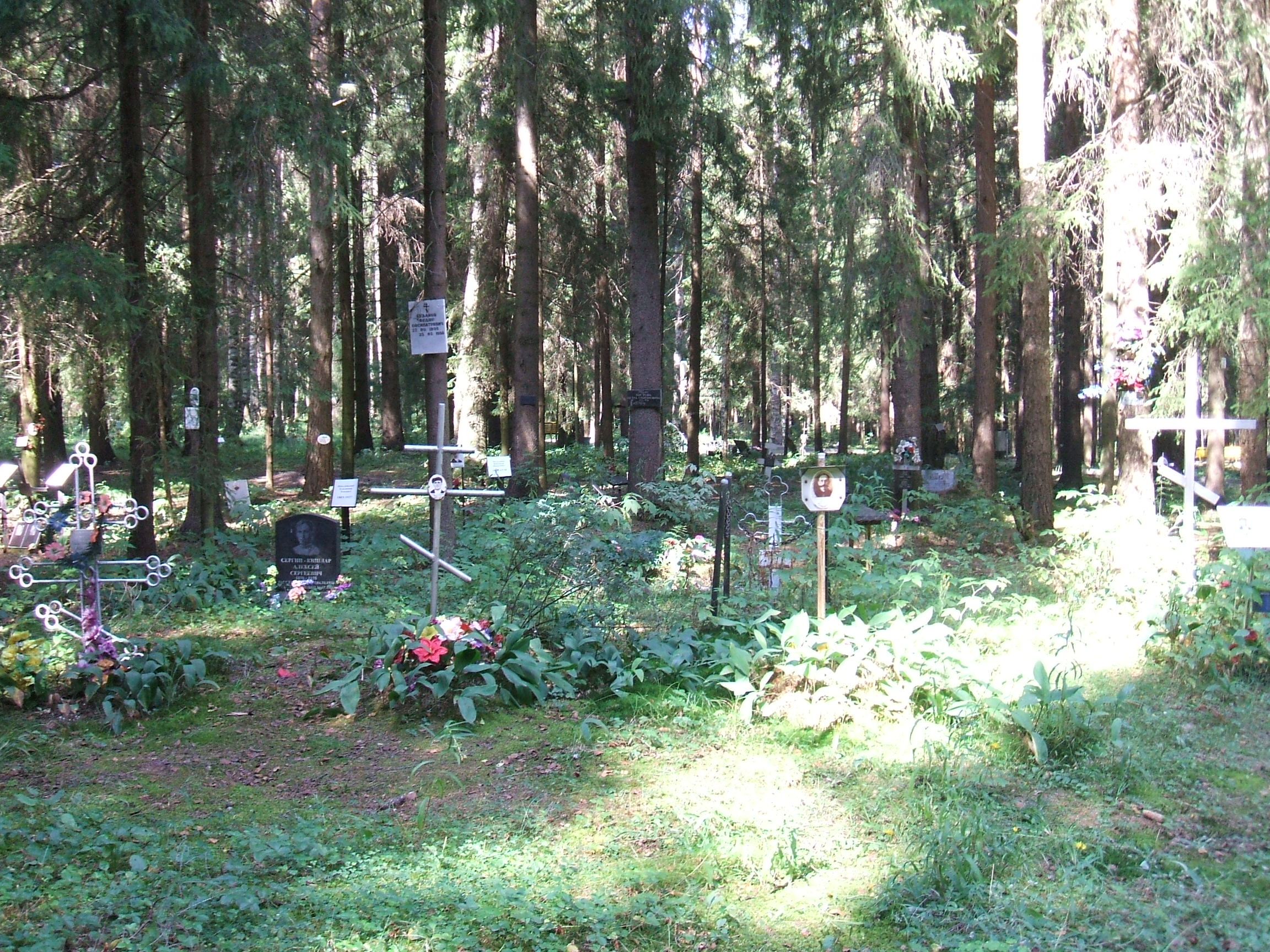
12. Private plaques & memorials

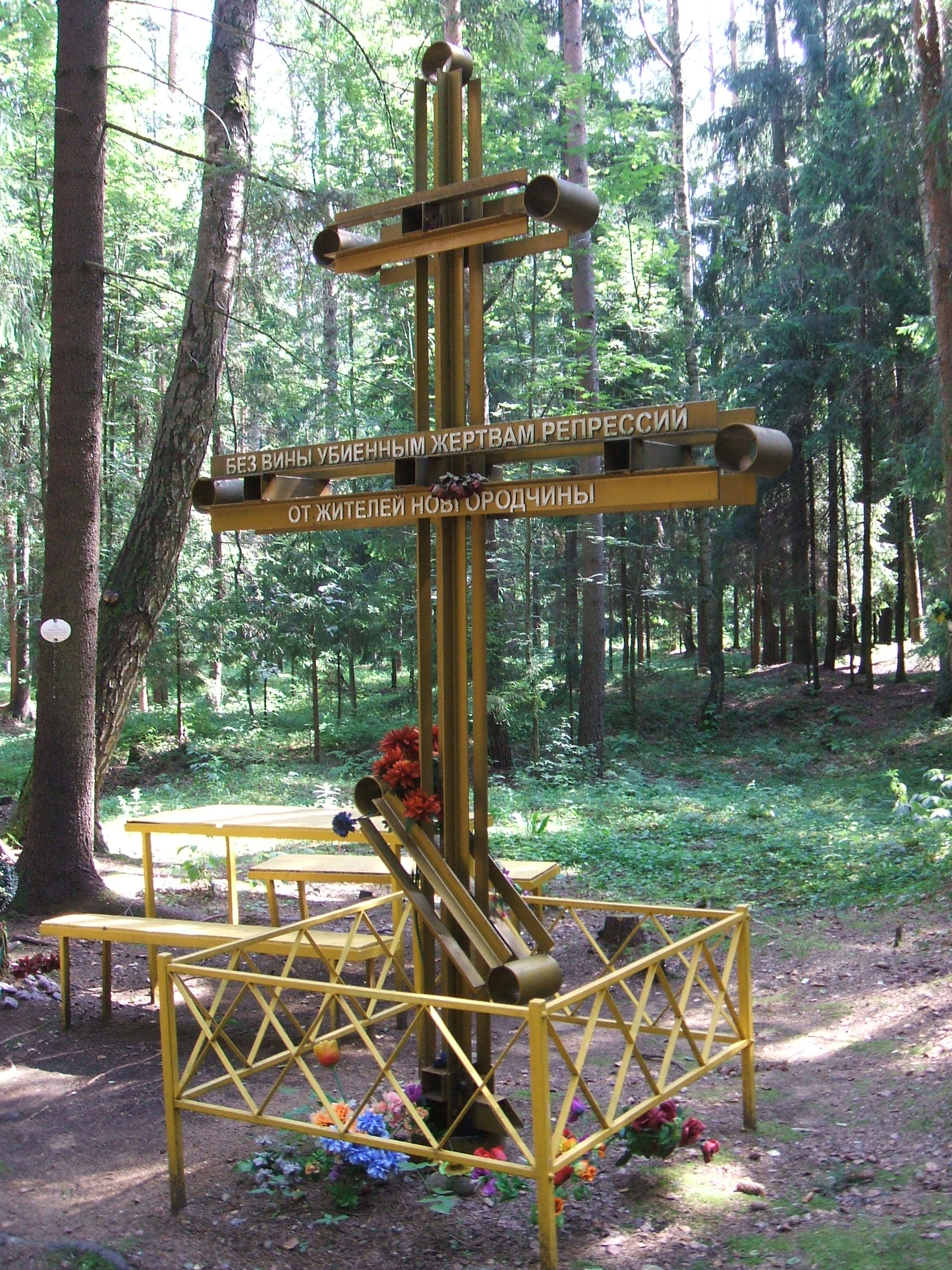
13. To Novgorodians

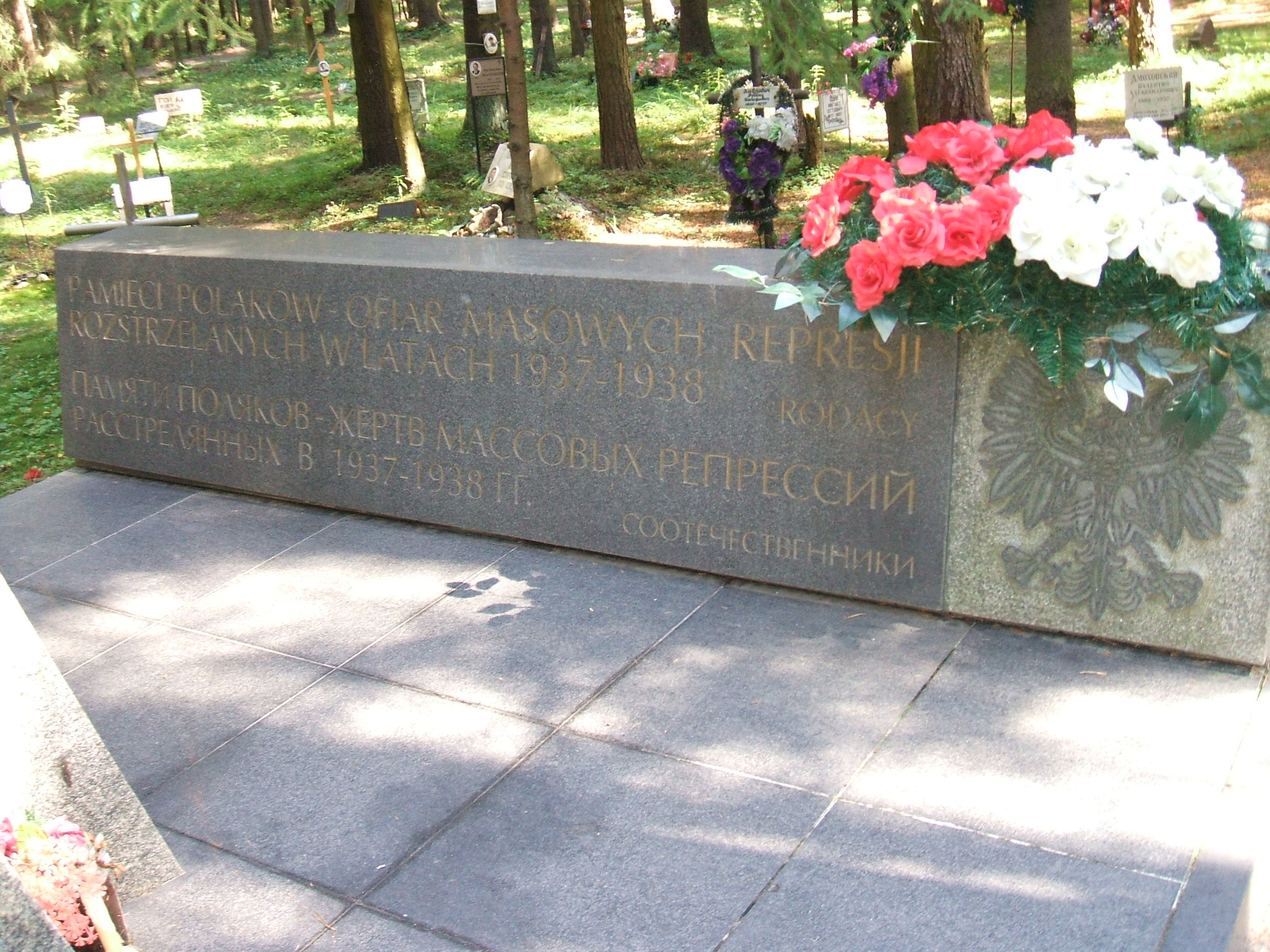
14. To Poles

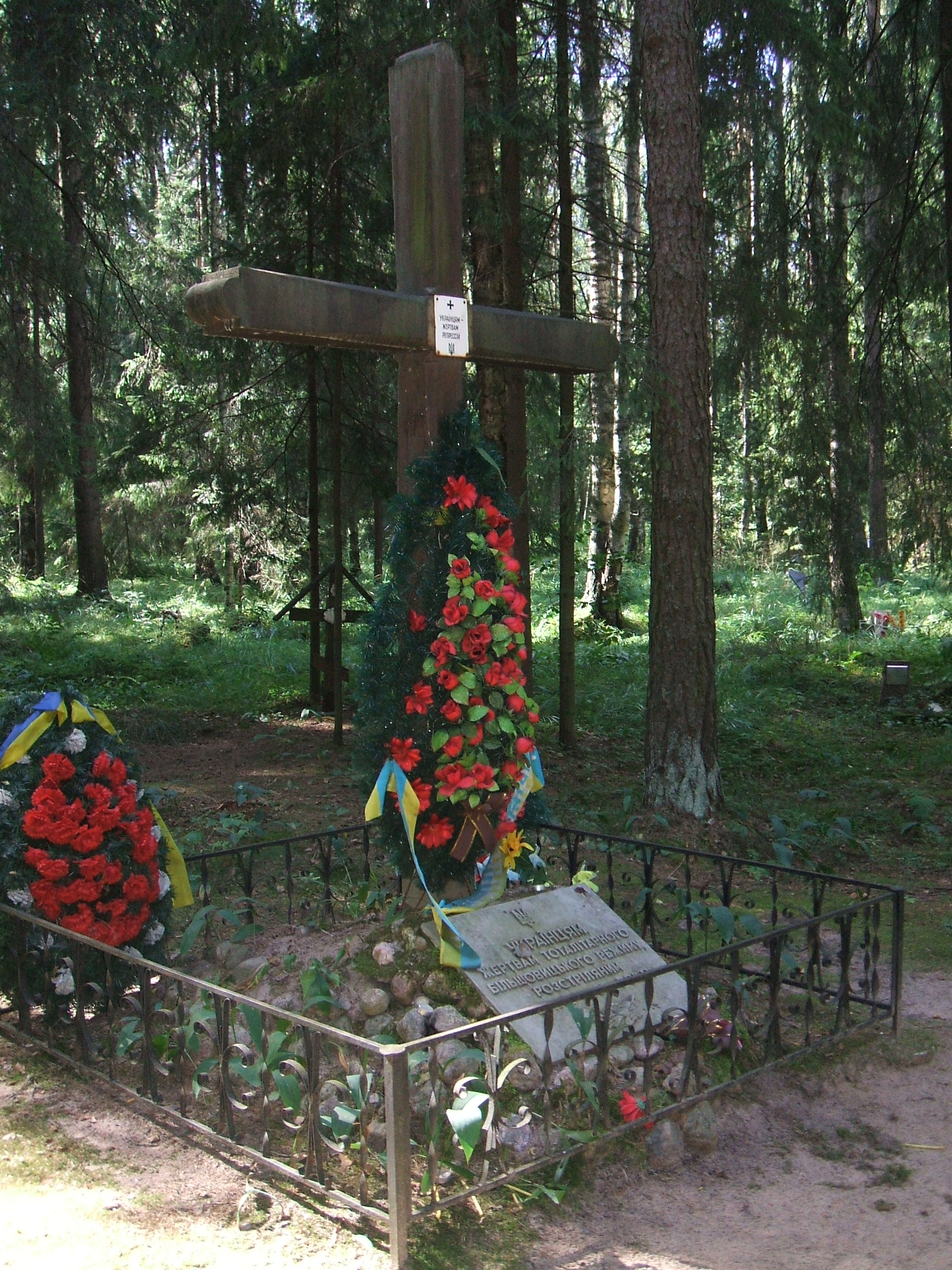
15. To Ukrainians

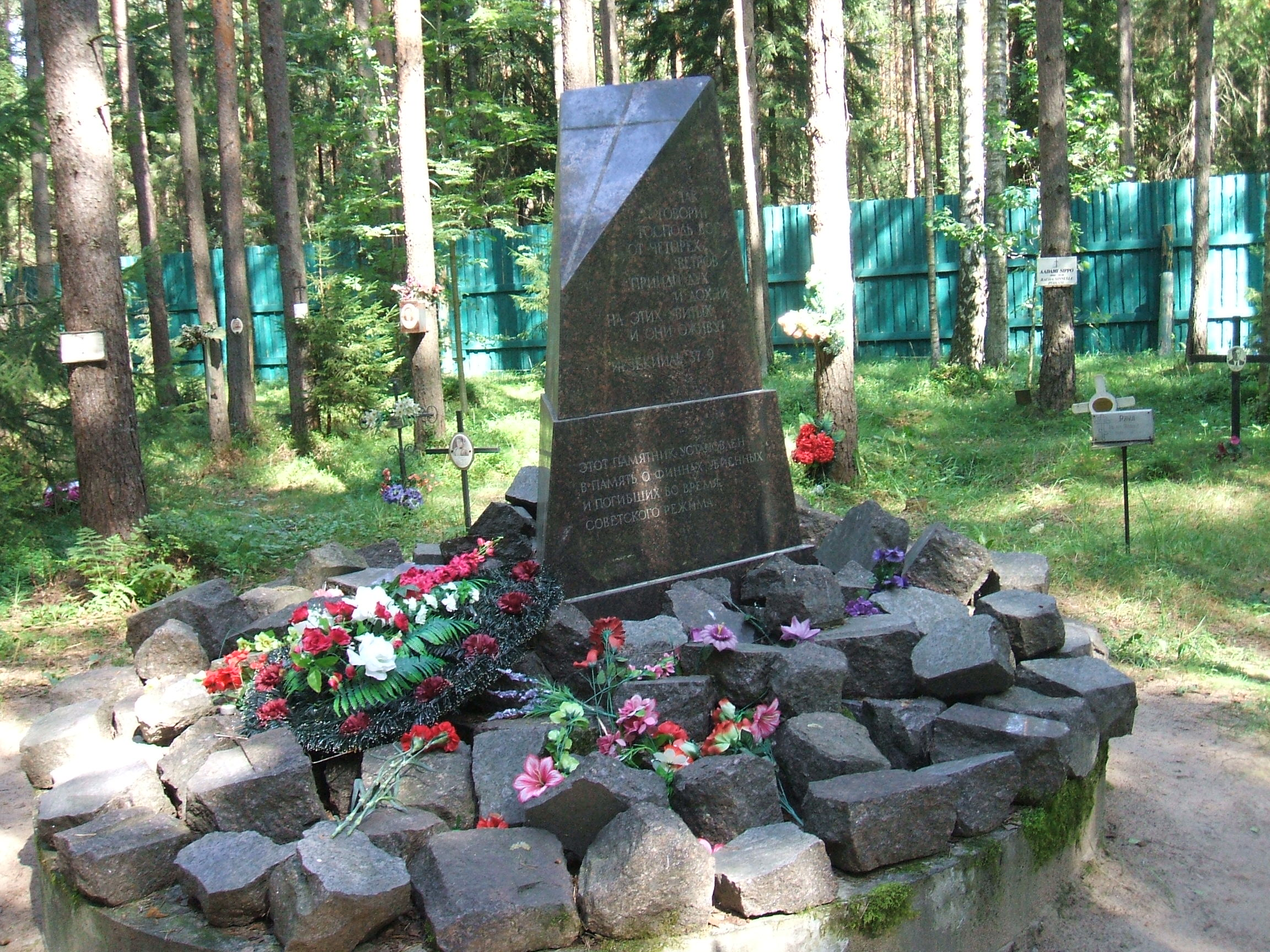
16. To Finns

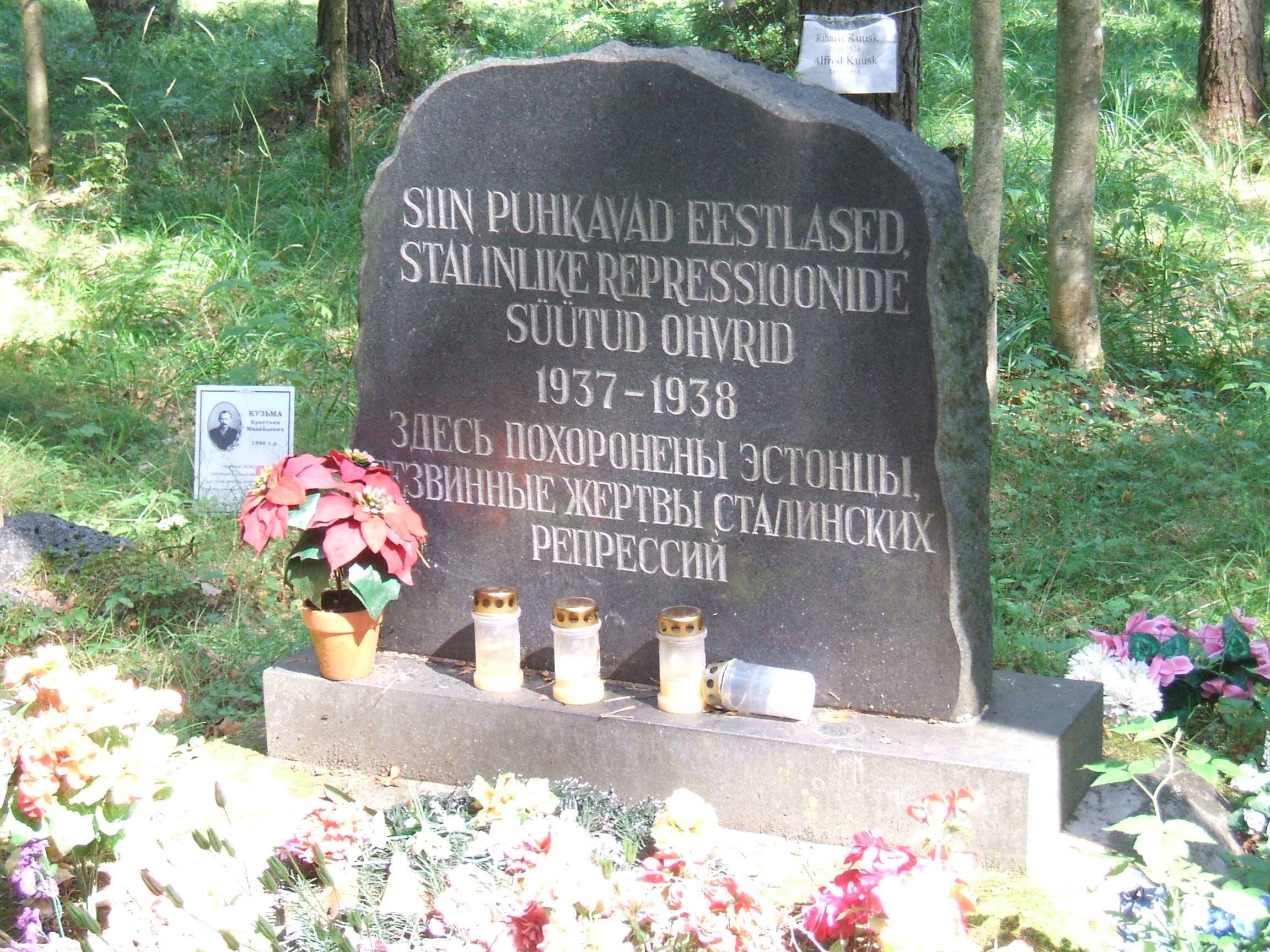
17. To Estonians

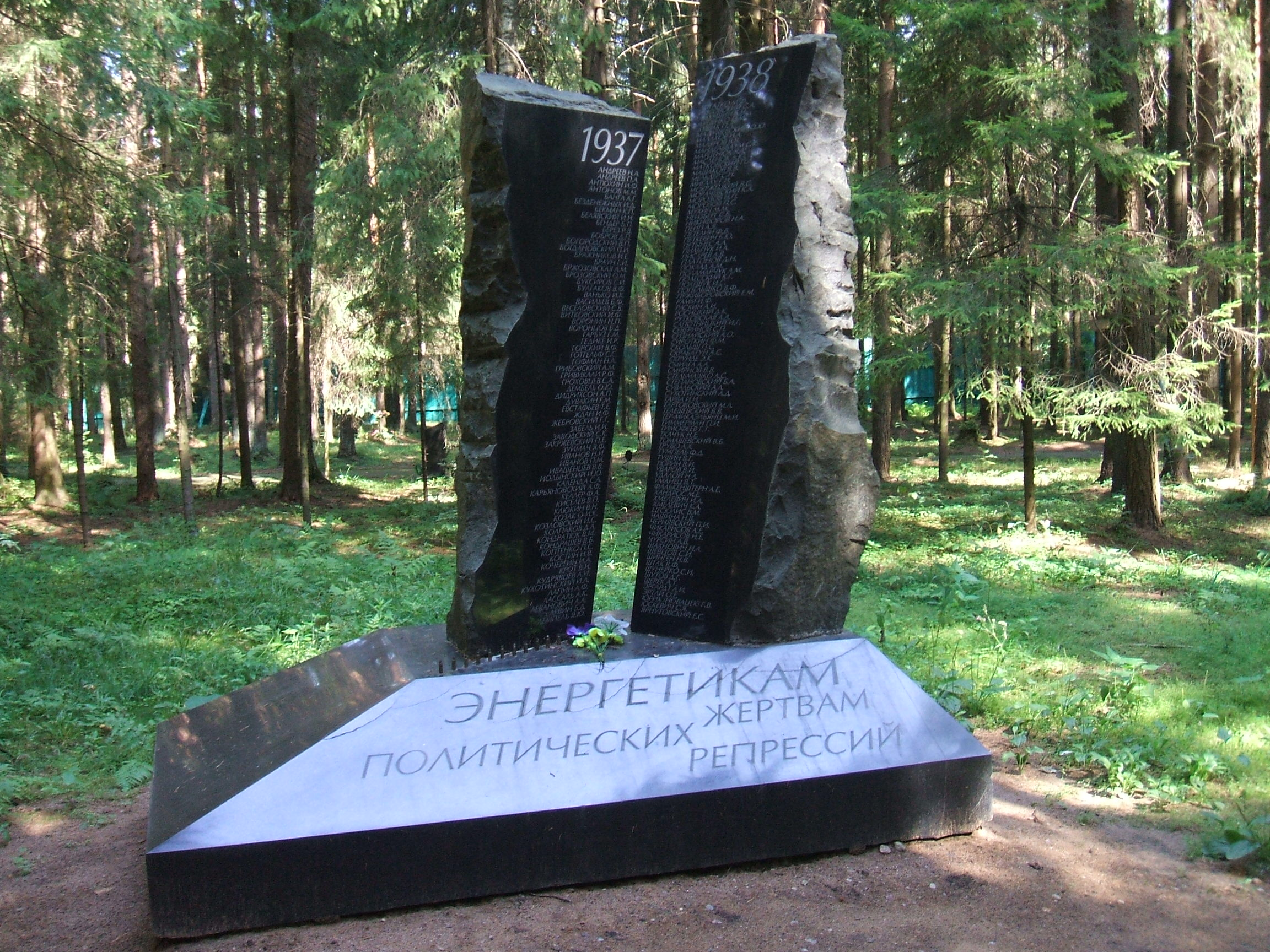
18. Energy workers shot by the NKVD

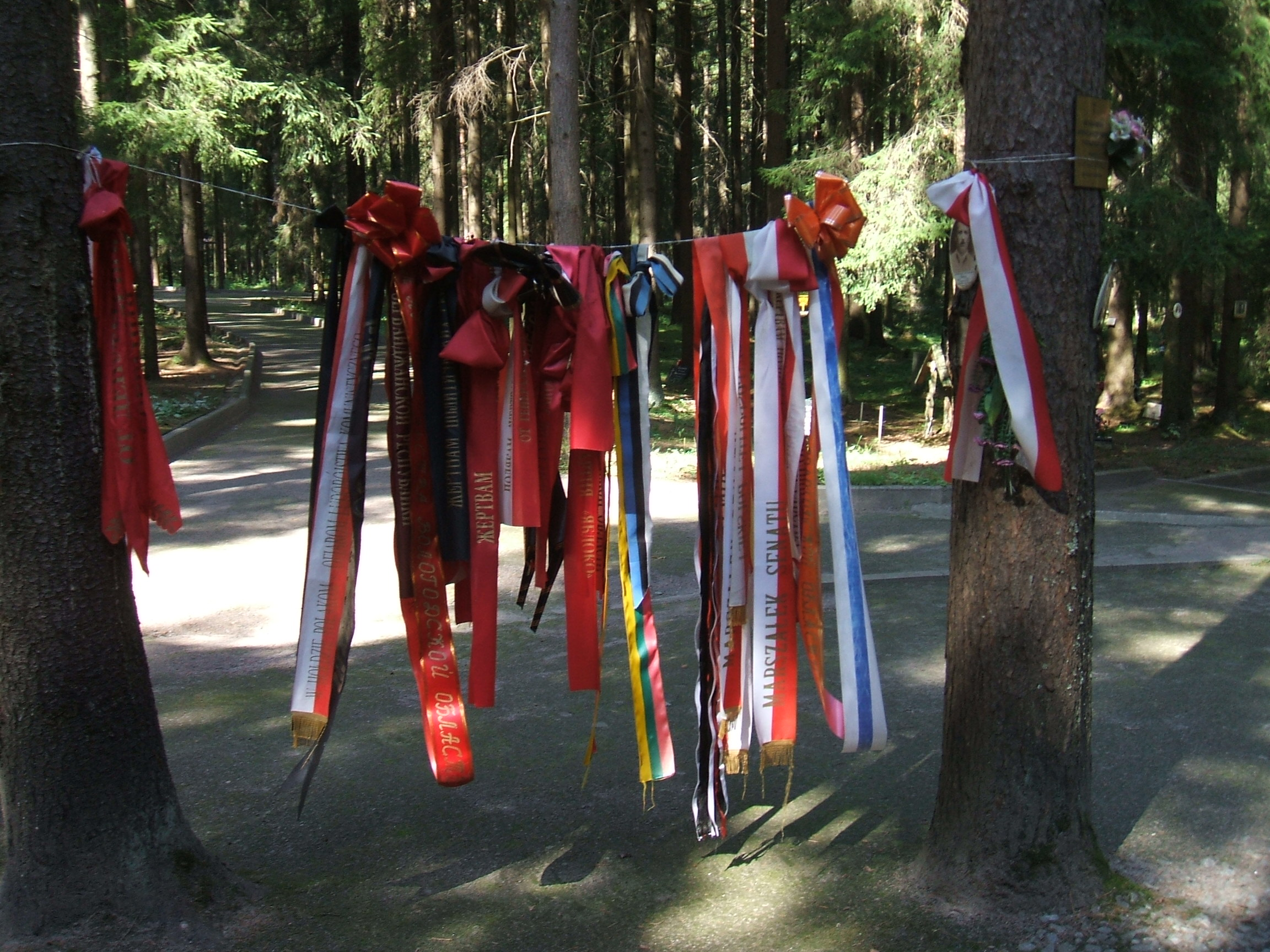
19. Funeral ribbons

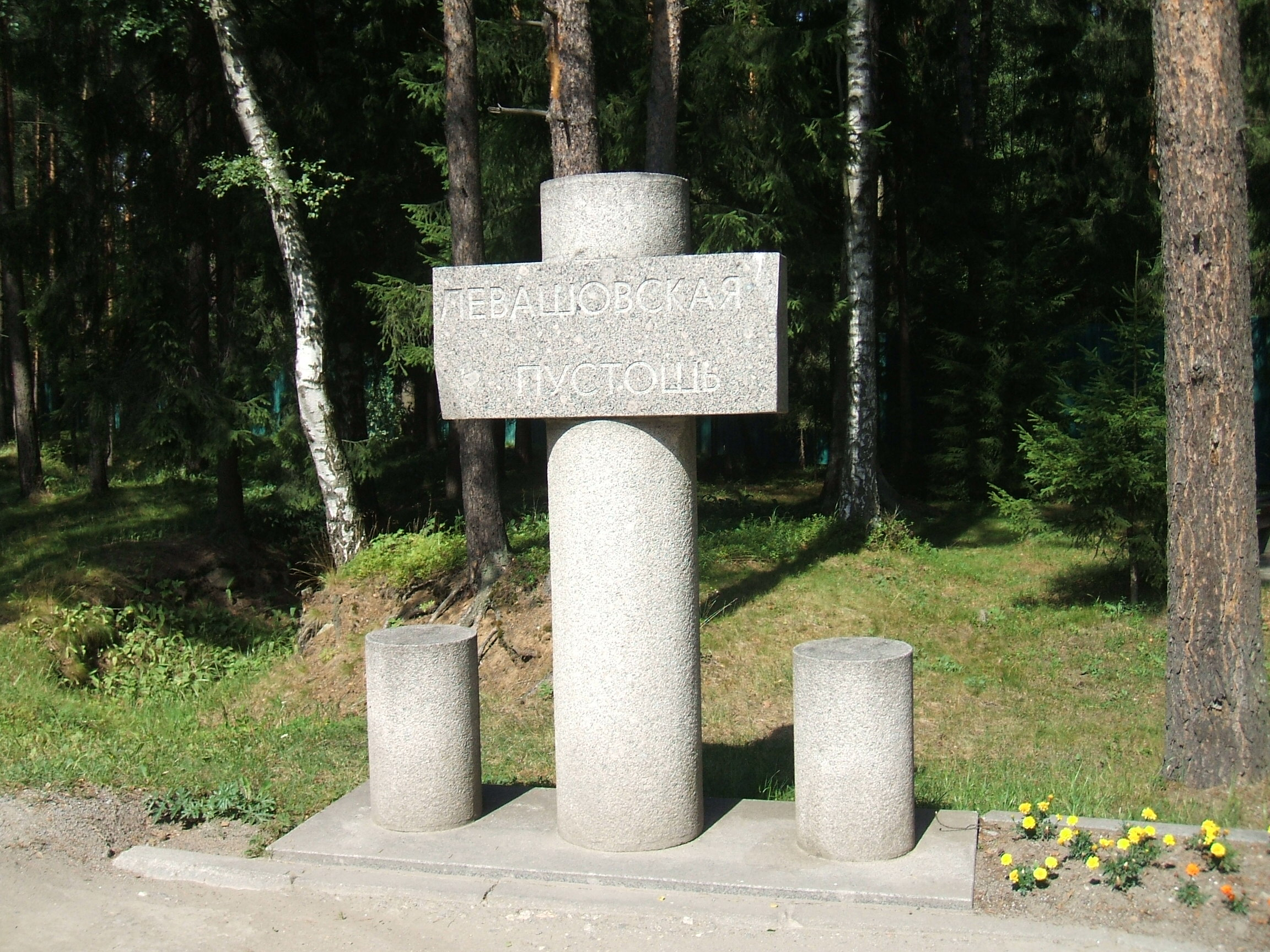
20. By the entrance to Levashovo

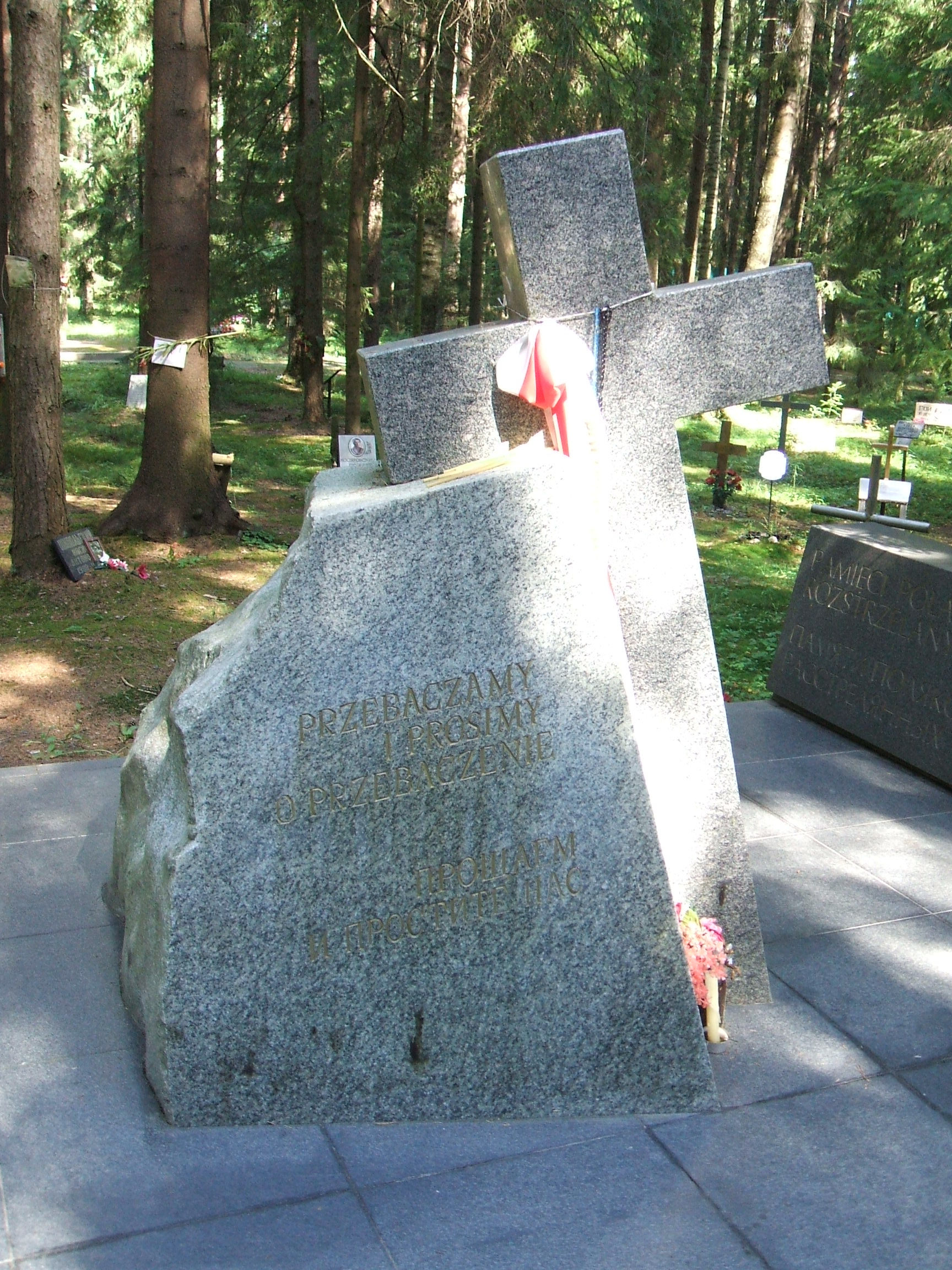
21. To Poles

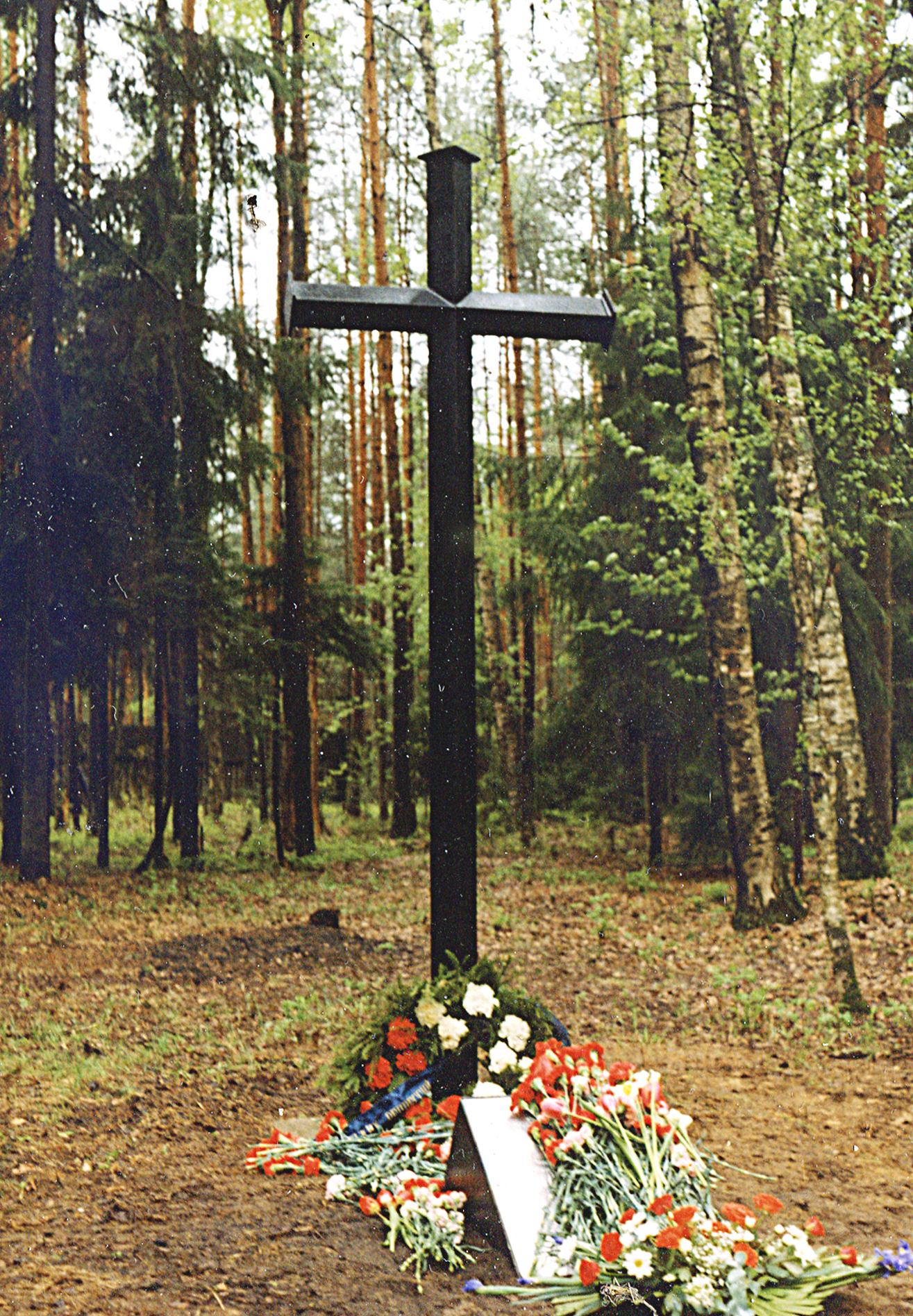
22. To Soviet / Russian Germans

== See also ==
- Butovo firing range, Moscow Region.
- Day in Remembrance of the Victims of Political Repression. Event in Russia commemorating the Soviet era.
- Kommunarka shooting ground, Moscow.
- Levashovo (air base)
- Mass graves in the Soviet Union
- Sandarmokh, Karelia.
- Solovetsky Stone (Saint Petersburg)
