= Anna Tieke =

German communist (1898–1938)

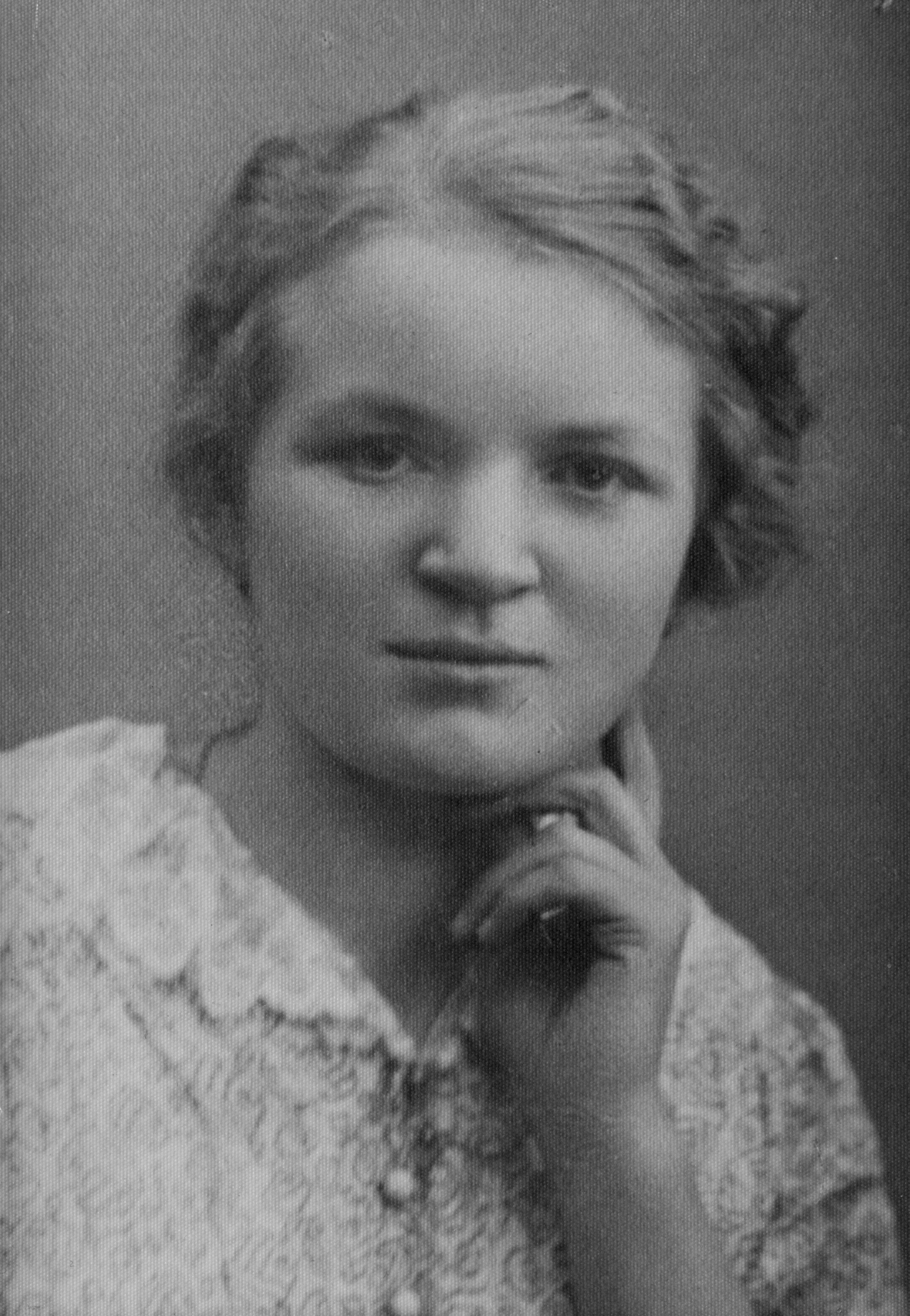
Anna Tieke, Berlin, 1919

Anna Tieke (born Anna Wittenburg: 11 November 1898 - 15 January 1938) was a German communist. With her family she relocated to the Soviet Union in 1931. On 15 January 1938 Anna Tieke and her son Rudolf, identified as "suspected German spies", were shot and killed in Leningrad. Formal "rehabilitation" came posthumously, in 1956.

== Provenance and early years ==
Anna Wittenburg was born in Berlin, the daughter of a carpenter. After leaving school she became a clerk. She was also politically engaged, joining the Young Socialists ("Arbeiter-Jugend") in 1911. To judge from the birth dates of their children, it was around 1915 that she married Rudolf Tieke (1895 – 1989), a gardener who later took work in the chemicals industry. During the 1920s his political activities and affiliations were broadly similar to hers. Between 1917 and 1922 she was a member of the Independent Social Democratic Party ("Unabhängige Sozialdemokratische Partei Deutschlands" / USPD) which had broken away from the mainstream Social Democratic Party in 1917, primarily because of rejection of the decision of the party leadership to operate what amounted to a parliamentary truce over funding for the war.

== Political activism in Berlin ==
Anna Tieke's three children were born in 1916, 1918 and 1921. From 1925 she was a member of the Communist Party, listed as a party official in the Women's Department of the Berlin-South sub-region ("Frauenabteilung des Berliner Unter Bezirk Süd"). She was also a member of the Red Front Women's and Girls' League ("Rote Frauen und Mädchenbund" / RFMB) and of the Anti-Militarist Military Policy Department ("Antimilitaristische Apparat Abteilung Militärpolitik") which is thought to have been a cover designation for the Communist Party's intelligence service.

== Emigration to the Soviet Union ==
In October 1931 Rudolf and Anna Tieke and their three children relocated from Berlin to the Soviet Union. They were motivated, it seems, by political idealism. "It is fantastic here" ("Es ist herrlich hier"), wrote Anna Tieke to her parents, left behind in Berlin, in a letter dated 6 November 1931. By this time the Tieke family were settled with other German emigrants, creating the "Spartak" production commune in Khosta (Хосте), along the Black Sea coast to the south of Krasnodar. A year later disaster struck in the form a massive famine across (and beyond) the entire Caucasus region. Historians still argue over how far the famine resulted from natural causes - primarily drought - and how far it reflected political and logistical failures caused by government implementation of enforced collectivisation. The widespread death from starvation was in any case real enough. The Tiekes narrowly avoided death by starvation thanks to the Comintern which managed to arrange their return to Moscow.

Their idealism seems to have been undiminished by their horrendous experiences: they remained convinced that one day the new socialist society would become reality, and they were determined to play their part in making it happen. While their teenage sons, Rudolf and Günter, were sent to a "practical school" ("Berufsschule") in Moscow, by 1935 Rudolf and Anna Tieke had moved with their daughter Ursula to Leningrad where they made their home. They lived in a large shared apartment building at Detskaya ulitsa 3. The building in which they lived was a so-called "Community House" which the city authorities had made available to accommodate foreign families, professional workers and political exiles from across Europe. Almost 100 families and unattached individuals lived in it.

Rudolf Tieke worked as a machinist at a factory in the city while Anna Tieke worked as a seamstress at a children's home. Their daughter Ursula attended the "German school" locally. The boys concluded their training in Moscow and joined their parents in Leningrad, taking work locally, so that by 1937 the family were reunited.

== Arrest of Rudolf Tieke ==
Meanwhile, the leader's belief - not entirely unjustified - that he was surrounded in the Kremlin by comrades who might not think him the best man for the job developed into acute personal paranoia. The foreign-born inhabitants of a "Community House" in Leningrad became vulnerable to official suspicion which became a widespread purge of the politically involved. Towards the end of summer 1937 the security services began to arrest the occupants of the house, generally starting with the men and then returning a few weeks later to arrest wives and adolescent children. Younger children were generally sent to children's homes, so that overnight complete families disappeared from the home, till a few months later when none were left. During the night of 3/4 September 1937 Rudolf Tieke was among the first to be detained. He cheerfully bade his family farewell, confident that he would soon be back because he knew he was not guilty of any crime and confident also that this would quickly be confirmed in any official investigation. An investigation was quickly launched. He was photographed and repeatedly interrogated. He was not permitted to read the records of the interrogation but, threatened with torture, he was nevertheless forced to sign an absurd confession to "membership of an anti-Soviet espionage organisation", to "terrorist spying on behalf of Germany" and to planning assassinations of leading party and national leaders of the Soviet Union. The security services reported they had found weapons for use by the organisation, though it appears that the alleged weapons were never actually found. Based on Rudolf Tieke's so-called confession the investigation ended, without witnesses, without charges, without a judge, and without involvement of any defence or other lawyers.

He was detained in Leningrad's Kresty Prison. While there news came through that back in Germany the German government had on 13 October 1937 revoked his German citizenship. The decision also extended expressly to his wife Anna and their three children. The Tieke family were now stateless.

Later Rudolf Tieke recanted his original confession, but without effect. He was sentenced to spend eight years at a labour camp which he survived. He was released in 1947 but not permitted to leave the country. In 1949 he was re-arrested and forcibly resettled in Krasnoyarsk. He would be permitted to leave the Soviet Union only in 1956.

== Arrest of Anna Tieke and of her elder son ==
Anna Tieke and her son Rudolf Tieke were arrested on 5 November 1937. Anna was identified as a Gestapo agent and accused of membership of a "fascist terrorist Trotskyite counter-revolutionary organisation" and of spreading "counter-revolutionary and fascist propaganda among German and Austrian emigrants". The younger children, Günter and Ursula, were at this stage left behind. Later, in 1955, the Soviet security services informed Rudolf Tieke that his wife had been sentenced in 1938 to spend ten years in a labour camp where she had died on 10 July 1942. Her son Rudolf had also died. Rudolf Tieke lived out his final decades in Berlin where he died in March 1989. It was only in 1991 or 1995, with a new openness sweeping the Soviet Union that his youngest daughter, Ursula, established that both her mother, Anna Tieke, and her elder brother, Rudolf Tieke, had been shot dead on 15 January 1938, and the bodies disposed of in a mass grave in the Leningrad (now Saint Petersburg) suburb Levashovo.

The younger children, Günter and Ursula, were not well treated following the removal of their parents. In 1941, with the German army at the gates of Leningrad, Ursula was identified as an enemy alien and sent to a prison in Vologda. In 1942 she was sent away to far-off Karaganda. Meanwhile, her brother Günter was recruited into the Labour army ("трудовая армия"). On his release in 1948 he was forbidden to leave Bashkortostan.

== Families reunited: rehabilitation ==
Joseph Stalin died in 1953 and his successors began, little by little, to identify and, between themselves, discuss some of the atrocities over which the dictator had presided. A cautious but perceptible political thaw ensued. Supported by the International Red Cross, Rudolf Tieke tried to find out what had happened to his wife and children. At the end of 1955 he got hold of an address for his daughter. He sought and obtained permission to leave the location of his internal exile and go to his daughter in Kazakhstan where, after eighteen years, father and daughter were reunited. By this time Ursula had acquired a husband of her own in the person of Meier Schwartz, a former Gulag inmate originally from Romania: the couple had two children. Rudolf Tieke also managed to re-establish contact with his younger son, Günter, and received the (false) information from the security services on the circumstances surrounding the deaths of his wife and elder son.

Also in 1955, Rudolf Tieke obtained a (secret) rehabilitation from the same military court that in 1950 had rejected his first application. The grounds stated in 1955 were that the witnesses in what they now described as Rudolf Teike's original trial had themselves now been declared not guilty, so that he himself had been incorrectly charged and sentenced. He was free to go.

In March 1956 Rudolf Tieke, his daughter Ursula, and his daughter's family returned to Berlin; Günter had decided to remain in the Soviet Union. East Berlin, to which they returned, was now part of the Soviet-sponsored German Democratic Republic (East Germany). East Germany had become a Soviet style one-party state, closely aligned at government level with the Soviet government in Moscow. It was from the East German ruling party, the Socialist Unity Party ("Sozialistische Einheitspartei Deutschlands" / SED), that in June 1956 Rudolf Tieke received a formal rehabilitation on his own account. In 1958, albeit without publicity, the SED acknowledged that his wife Anna and son Rudolf had been unlawfully arrested and shot. It seems that when Rudolf Tieke himself died in March 1959 he was still not aware of this.

== Celebration ==
It has subsequently been determined that the woods surrounding Levashovo, some 30 km / 18 miles to the north of central St. Petersburg (formerly Leningrad) contain mass graves in which the remains of around 47,000 people, murdered between 1937 and 1954 were placed. The woods have been redesignated as a "memorial cemetery". Memorials have been set up by relatives, descendants and others to some of the victims whose remains are believed to have ended up in the mass graves. Among these, in 2011 a memorial stone was placed to the memory of Anna Tieke and her son Rudi. They are among 28 men and women identified in the mass graves who were originally arrested while living at the "Community House" at Detskaya ulitsa 3, falsely charged and then killed, but posthumously rehabilitated.
