= Kirill Stutzka =

Russian military officer in Latvia

Kirils Stucka
- Born: May 14, 1890; Stāmeriena Parish, Governorate of Livonia, Russian Empire
- Died: January 17, 1938 (aged 47) Levashovo Memorial Cemetery near Leningrad, Soviet Union
- Allegiance: Russian Empire; Soviet Union
- Branch: Imperial Russian Army; Soviet Red Army
- Service years: 1914–1917 (Russian Empire); 1918–1937 (Soviet Union)
- Rank: Komkor
- Conflicts: World War I Russian Civil War

Kirils Stucka (Russian: Кирилл Андреевич Стуцка, Kirill Andreevich Stutzka; 14 May 1890 – 17 January 1938) was an officer of the Latvian Riflemen, later Soviet komkor.

He was born in Stāmeriena Parish, Governorate of Livonia. Stucka fought in the 3rd Courland Latvian Riflemen Regiment of the Imperial Russian Army in World War I before going over to the Bolsheviks in the subsequent civil war. He was a recipient of the Order of the Red Banner.

During the Great Purge, as a part of the so-called "Latvian Operation", Stucka was arrested on November 29, 1937, and later executed and buried at the Levashovo Memorial Cemetery. After the death of Joseph Stalin, he was rehabilitated in 1956.

== Bibliography ==
- Черушев Н. С.; Черушев Ю. Н. (2012), Расстрелянная элита РККА (командармы 1-го и 2-го рангов, комкоры, комдивы и им равные): 1937—1941. Биографический словарь [Shot elite of the Red Army (commanders of the 1st and 2nd ranks, comkors, divisional commanders and their equal): 1937-1941. Biographical Dictionary], Moscow: Kuchkovo field; Metropolis [Кучково поле; Мегаполис], pp. 111–112, ISBN 978-5-9950-0217-8

== Sources ==
- КОМКОР 55. Стуцка Кирилл Андреевич
- СПИСОК ГРАЖДАН, РАССТРЕЛЯННЫХ В ЛЕНИНГРАДЕ, ВНЕ ЛЕНИНГРАДА И ВПОСЛЕДСТВИИ РЕАБИЛИТИРОВАННЫХ (ТОМ 8 «ЛМ»)
