= Levashovo, Vladimir Oblast =

Levashovo Левашово
- Village
- Location within Vladimir Oblast Location within Russia
- Coordinates: 56°18′N 39°15′E
- Country: Russia
- Region: Vladimir Oblast
- District: Kolchuginsky District
- Time zone: UTC+3:00

Levashovo (Russian: Левашово) is a rural locality (a village) in Florishchinskoye Rural Settlement, Kolchuginsky District, Vladimir Oblast, Russia. The population was 15 as of 2010.

== Geography ==
Levashovo is located 19 km west of Kolchugino (the district's administrative centre) by road. Florishchi is the nearest rural locality.
