= Levashovo (air base) =

Airbase in Saint Petersburg, Russia

Levashovo
- Levashovo, Saint Petersburg in Russia
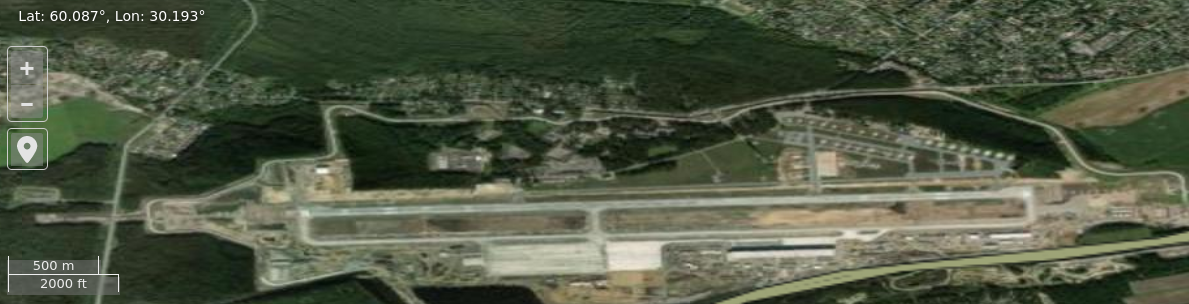
- Satellite imagery of Levashovo air base

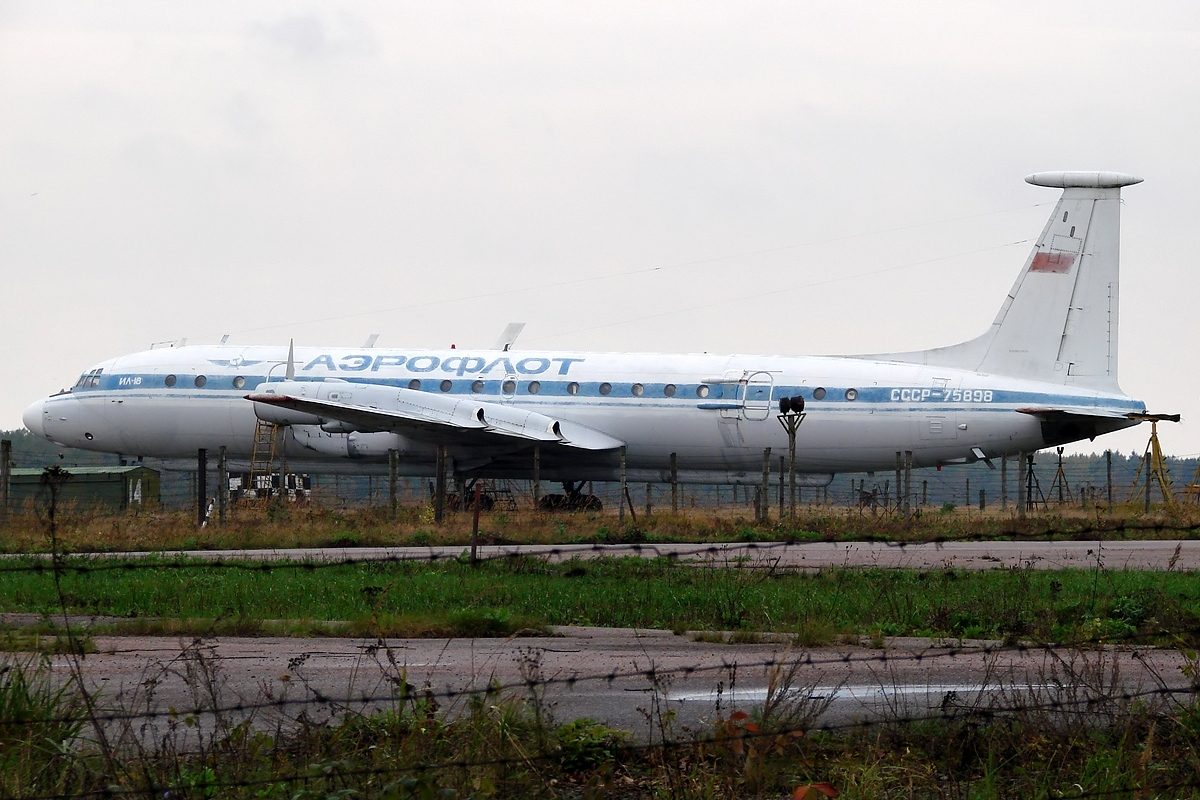
- Ilyushin aircraft at Levashovo, 22 September 2007

Site information
- Type: Air Base
- Owner: Ministry of Defence
- Operator: Russian Aerospace Forces
- Controlled by: 6th Air and Air Defence Forces Army

Location
- Shown within Saint Petersburg Levashovo (Russia)
- Coordinates: 60°5′12″N 30°11′36″E

Site history
- Built: 1960
- In use: 1960 - present

Airfield information
- Identifiers: ICAO: ULLV
- Elevation: 18 metres (59 ft) AMSL
Runways
Direction	Length and surface
08/26	2,700 metres (8,858 ft) Concrete

Levashovo (also Levashevo) is an air base located to the southwest of Levashovo, within the northern limits of the federal subject of Saint Petersburg, Russia.

The base is home to the 33rd Independent Composite Aviation Regiment.

It houses mostly small transport planes mostly belonging to 549 AB (549th Air Base), most notably the Antonov An-12, Antonov An-26, and Tupolev Tu-134, along with Mi-6 and Mi-8 helicopters.

The 549th Air Base has seen many redesignations since being activated in 1942 as the 6th independent Transport Aviation Unit.

- 20.8.46 renamed 138th independent Mixed Aviation Regiment.
- 11.3.48 renamed 247th independent Mixed Aviation Squadron.
- 20.10.81 renamed 138th independent Mixed Aviation Regiment.
- 5.6.96 renamed 202nd independent Mixed Aviation Squadron.
- 27.4.98 renamed 138th independent Mixed Aviation Regiment.
- 2004 renamed 87th Aviation Base, and later 549th Aviation Base.

The unit has been based at Levashevo since 1960. Aircraft in service have included the Mi-1, Mi-2, Mi-4, Mi-6 (Mi-6VPK and Mi-22 in the 1980s), Mi-8, Li-2, Il-14, An-2, An-14, An-12, An-24/26, Tupolev Tu-124 and Tu-134, 1981-, and the Ilyushin Il-22 from 1981. In 2000, according to the Conventional Forces in Europe treaty data exchange, the unit had 37 Mi-8 and some An-12. In 2009, the unit had two Tu-134s, 6 An-26, 5 An-12 and 5 Mi-8.

The unit has been part of:

- 13th Air Army, 1942–1949
- 76th Air Army, 1949–1980
- VVS Leningrad Military District, 1980–1988
- 76th Air Army, 1988–1998
- 6th Air and Air Defence Forces Army VVS and PVO, 1998–present

== See also ==
- List of military airbases in Russia
