= Levashovo, Saint Petersburg =

Municipal settlement in St. Petersburg, Russia

Coordinates: 60.1031°N 30.2075°E

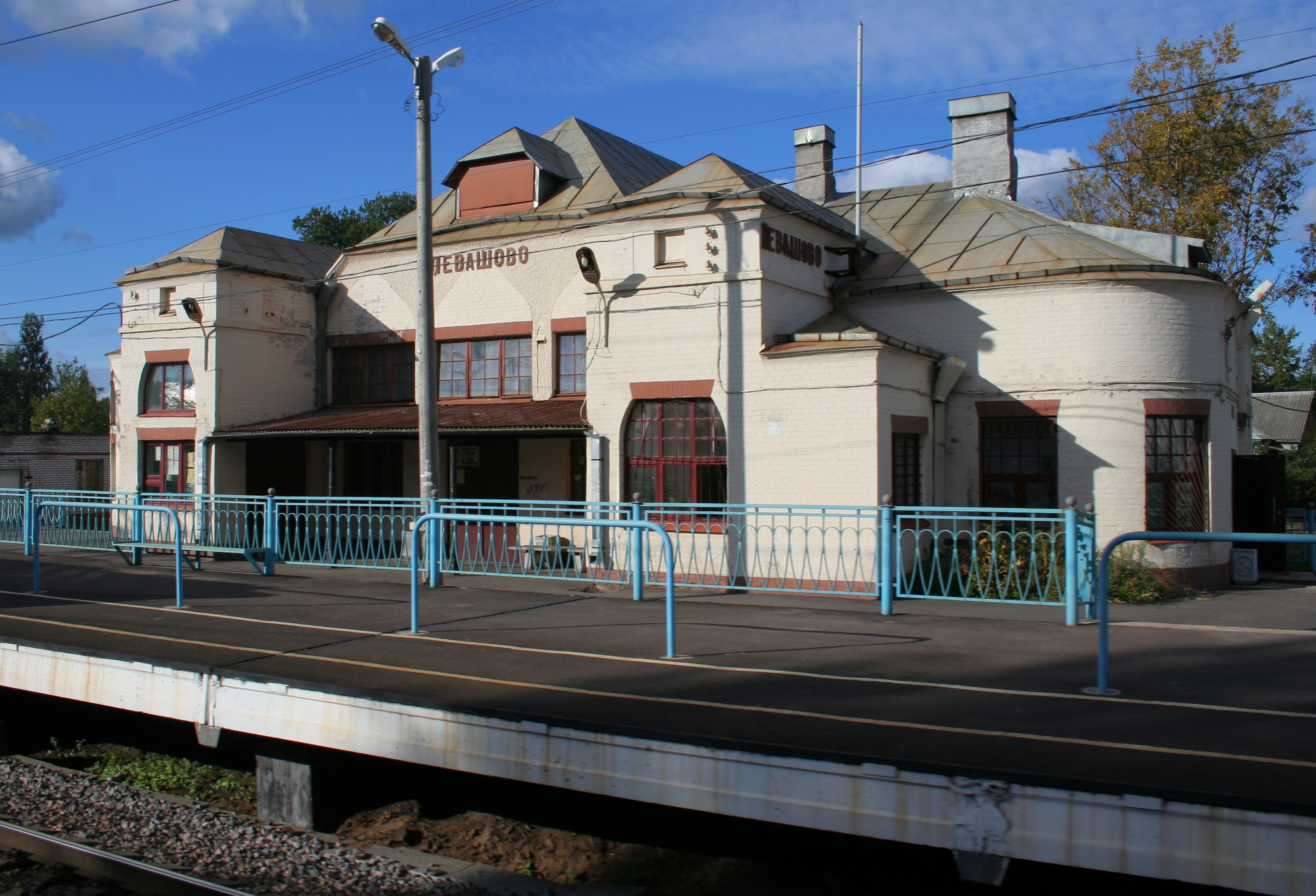
Levashovo railway station building. September 2010

Levashovo (Russian: Левашово) is a municipal settlement under the administrative jurisdiction of Vyborgsky District of the federal city of St. Petersburg, Russia, and a station of the Riihimäki – Saint Petersburg Railway. Population: 3,665 (2010 census); 4,095 (2002 census).

The building of the station was designed by Bruno Granholm.
