= Bayev and Others v. Russia =

Case before the European Court of Human Rights

Decided 20 June 2017
- Full case name: Bayev and Others v. Russia
- Case: 67667/09, 44092/12, and 56717/12
- Chamber: Third
- Language of proceedings: English
- Nationality of parties: Russian

Ruling
- Violation of Article 10 alone and in conjunction with Article 14

Court composition
- President; Helena Jäderblom
- Judges: Luis López Guerra; Helen Keller (judge); Dmitry Dedov; Alena Poláčková; Georgios Sergides; Jolien Schukking

Instruments cited
- European Convention on Human Rights

Legislation affecting
- Russian gay propaganda law

Case opinions
- Majority: Jäderblom, joined by Keller, Guerra, Poláčková, Sergides, Schukking
- Dissent: Dedov

Bayev and Others v. Russia (67667/09, 44092/12 and 56717/12) was a case brought to the European Court of Human Rights by three Russian activists—Nikolay Bayev, Aleksei Aleksandrovich Kiselev, and Nikolay Alekseyev—alleging that the Russian gay propaganda law infringed on their freedom of expression guaranteed by Article 10 of the European Convention on Human Rights. On 20 June 2017, the court ruled that the applicants' freedom of expression had been compromised. The only dissent was from Dmitry Dedov, the judge elected with respect to Russia.

== Background ==
In 2009, Ryazan Oblast passed the "Law on Protection of the Morality of Children in the Ryazan Oblast" and "Law on Administrative Offenses" making the "promotion of homosexuality" an administrative offense. Nikolay Bayev, Aleksei Aleksandrovich Kiselev, and Nikolay Alekseyev were Russian LGBT rights activists. Bayev had demonstrated with signs stating "Homosexuality is normal" and "I am proud of my homosexuality". Kiselev and Alekseyev protested next to a library holding signs stating "Russia has the world's highest rate of teenage suicide. This number includes a large proportion of homosexuals. They take this step because of the lack of information about their nature. Deputies are child-killers. Homosexuality is good!" and "Children have the right to know. Great people are also sometimes gay; gay people also become great. Homosexuality is natural and normal". The applicants were convicted and fined based on these laws and their appeals were denied by Russian courts. In a 2009 case brought to the Constitutional Court of Russia by Bayev, Alekseyev, and Irina Fedotova, the court ruled that the anti-LGBT propaganda laws were compatible with the Constitution of Russia.

Prior to the Bayev judgement, sociologist Paul Johnson stated that "[t]here is an emerging consensus of opinion" that the Russian gay propaganda law in both its existence and enforcement violated the ECHR. Justine De Kerf predicted that the anti-gay propaganda law could not be upheld in Strasbourg because "this type of legislation even threatens the very concepts the Court is bound to protect: universal human rights and the principles of democracy". The Council of Europe's advisory body on constitutional law, the Venice Commission, passed a resolution stating that bans on "propaganda of homosexuality" "are incompatible with ECHR and international human rights standards".

== Case ==
The case was heard by the third section of the ECtHR, composed of the judges Helena Jäderblom (Sweden), Luis López Guerra (Spain), Helen Keller (Switzerland), Dmitry Dedov (Russia), Alena Poláčková (Slovakia), Georgios Sergides (Cyprus), and Jolien Schukking (Netherlands). The majority opinion supported by six of the seven judges focused on Article 10 of the European Convention on Human Rights (freedom of expression), with a shorter section considering Article 14 (prohibition of discrimination in the exercise of Convention rights). Bayev is the only case, as of October 2021, that the court has found a violation of Article 14 in conjunction with Article 10. The court considered that Russia did not provide "convincing and weighty reasons justifying the difference in treatment" between speech related to same-sex versus opposite-sex relationships. Russia argued that homosexual propaganda could cause "a minor [to] be enticed into '[a] homosexual lifestyle'", but the court found that this claim was "lacking any evidentiary basis".

The only dissent from the ruling was Dedov, who supported the Russian government's arguments that the law was necessary to protect children from sexual abuse and did not find a violation. Human rights lawyer Gabriel Armas-Cardona states, "Dedov didn't dissent out of a bias in favor of his country, but from a fundamentally different world view than that of the Western judges."

== Reactions ==
Despite the Bayev judgement, the anti-gay propaganda law remained part of Russian law. Bayev is similar to other LGBT-related cases against Russia taken to the ECtHR in that the court ruled in favor of the applicants but the ruling had little effect in Russia. The verdict establishes a precedent that is likely to be applicable to other bans on LGBT-related speech, including those passed in Latvia and Lithuania.

Ghent University researchers Pieter Cannoot and Claire Poppelwell-Scevak note that the judgement is very strongly worded, such that "the Court could even be seen to go have gone so far as ridiculing the Russian Government's arguments". However, they state that the Bayev judgement will not automatically translate to the court recognizing other LGBT rights, such as same-sex marriage. While they supported the verdict, Kushtrim Istrefi and Emma Irving criticized the court's reasoning for being overly didactic and dismissive of Russia's arguments. They thought it would better serve the cause of human rights to adopt a more restrained tone and with a greater focus on the legal reasons why the Russian law was incompatible with the ECHR. Armas-Cardona considered that the majority gave Russia's arguments exactly the same scrutiny that they merited. University of Birmingham academic Damian A. Gonzalez-Salzberg considers the case "probably the Court's most emphatic support to the public character of homosexuality" and the right of LGBT people to advocate for increased rights and freedoms.
