= Nikolaj Bajev =

Russian LGBT rights activist

Nikolaj Viktorovitsj Bajev
- Born: 1974 (age 51–52); Moscow
- Occupation: LGBT Activist Journalist Writer

Nikolaj Viktorovitsj Bajev or Nikolay Bayev (Russian: Николай Викторович Баев; born 1974 in Moscow) is a Russian LGBT activist and journalist.

Bajev was the co-founder of the first gay pride in Russia in 2006.

Bajev, together with two other activists, Aleksej Kiseljov and Nikolay Alexeyev, filed a lawsuit with the European Court of Human Rights (ECHR) against the Russian gay propaganda law (2013) and various regional anti-gay propaganda laws (2006- 2013). This lawsuit is known as Bajev et al. v. Russia. On 20 June 2017, the ECHR ruled in favor of the prosecutors stating that Russia acted in violation of Articles 10 and 14 of the European Convention on Human Rights and awarded the activists the equivalent of 50,000 euros in damages.
