= Russification =

Measures to increase the influence of Russian culture and language

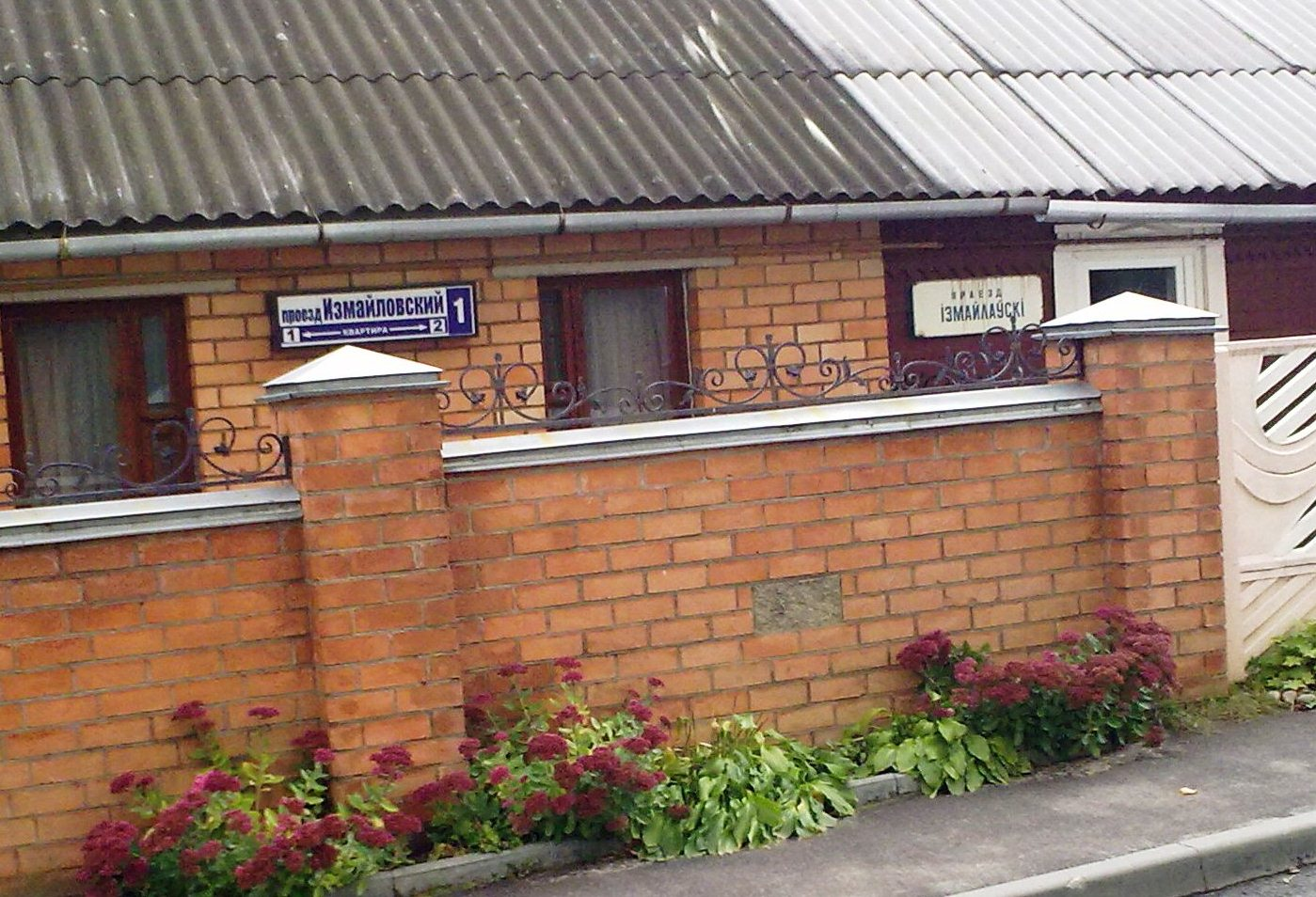
Minsk, Belarus, 2011: old street sign in Belarusian (right) replaced with new one in Russian (left).

Russification (Russian: русификация, romanized: rusifikatsiya), Russianisation or Russianization, is a form of cultural assimilation in which non-Russians adopt Russian culture and Russian language either voluntarily or as a result of a deliberate state policy.

Russification was pursued by the governments of the Russian Empire and the Soviet Union, either as a goal in itself or as a consequence of policies aimed at centralization and modernization during the final years of both countries existence

In politics, Russification can take the form of assigning Russian nationals to lead administrative positions in national institutions. In culture, Russification primarily consists of the hegemonization of the Russian language in official business and the strong influence of the Russian language on national idioms. The shifts in demographics in favor of the ethnic Russian population are sometimes considered a form of Russification as well.

Some researchers distinguish Russification, as a process of changing one's ethnic self-label or identity from a non-Russian ethnonym to Russian, from Russianization, the spread of the Russian language, culture, and people into non-Russian cultures and regions, distinct also from Sovietization or the imposition of institutional forms established by the Communist Party of the Soviet Union throughout the territory ruled by that party. In this context Russification cannot be confused with either Russianization or Sovietization. In fact, Russianization and Sovietization did not necessarily imply Russification as a process of changing the language and identity of non-Russian ethnic groups into Russian. Thus, despite long exposure to the Russian language and culture, as well as to Sovietization, at the end of the Soviet era, non-Russians were on the verge of becoming a majority of the population in the Soviet Union.

== History ==
The Russification of Uralic-speaking people, such as Vepsians, Mordvins, Maris, and Permians, indigenous to large parts of western and central Russia had already begun with the original eastward expansion of East Slavs. Written records of the oldest period are scarce, but toponymic evidence indicates that this expansion was accomplished at the expense of various Volga-Finnic peoples, who were gradually assimilated by Russians; beginning with the Merya and the Muroma early in the 2nd millennium AD.

In the 13th to 14th century, the Russification of the Komi began but it did not penetrate the Komi heartlands until the 18th century. However, by the 19th century, Komi-Russian bilingualism had become the norm and there was an increasing Russian influence on the Komi language.

After the Russian defeat in the Crimean War in 1856 and the January Uprising of 1863, Tsar Alexander II increased Russification to reduce the threat of future rebellions. Russia was populated by many minority groups, and forcing them to accept the Russian culture was an attempt to prevent self-determination tendencies and separatism. In the 19th century, Russian settlers on traditional Kazakh land (misidentified as Kyrgyz at the time) drove many of the Kazakhs over the border to China.

Russification was extended to non-Muscovite ethnographic groups that composed former Kievan Rus, namely Ukrainians and Belarusians, whose vernacular language and culture developed differently from that of Muscovy due to separation after the partitioning of Kievan Rus. The mentality behind Russification when applied to these groups differed from that applied to others, in that they were claimed to be part of the All-Russian or Triune Russian nation by the Russian Imperial government and by subscribers to Russophilia. Russification competed with contemporary nationalist movements in Ukraine and Belarus that were developing during the 19th century. Russian Imperial authorities as well as modern Russian nationalists asserted that Russification was an organic national consolidation process that would accomplish the goals of homogenizing the Russian nation as they saw it, and reversing the effects of Polonisation.

=== In the Soviet Union ===
After the 1917 revolution, authorities in the USSR decided to abolish the use of the Arabic alphabet in native languages in Soviet-controlled Central Asia, in the Caucasus, and in the Volga region (including Tatarstan). This detached the local Muslim populations from exposure to the language and writing system of the Quran. Until the late 1930s, the new alphabet for these languages was based on the Latin alphabet and inspired by the Turkish alphabet. In 1939–1940, the Soviets decided that a number of these languages (including Tatar, Kazakh, Uzbek, Turkmen, Tajik, Kyrgyz, Azerbaijani, and Bashkir) would henceforth use variations of the Cyrillic script (see Cyrillization in the Soviet union). Not only that, the spelling and writing of these new Cyrillic words must also be in accordance with the Russian language.

Some historians evaluating the Soviet Union as a colonial empire, applied the "prison of nations" idea to the USSR. Thomas Winderl wrote "The USSR became in a certain sense more a prison-house of nations than the old Empire had ever been."

==== Korenizatsiya ====
Stalin's Marxism and the National Question (1913) provided the basic framework for nationality policy in the Soviet Union. The early years of said policy, from the early 1920s to the mid-1930s, were guided by the policy of korenizatsiya ("indigenization"), during which the new Soviet regime sought to reverse the long-term effects of Russification on the non-Russian populations. As the regime was trying to establish its power and legitimacy throughout the former Russian empire, it went about constructing regional administrative units, recruiting non-Russians into leadership positions, and promoting non-Russian languages in government administration, the courts, the schools, and the mass media. The slogan then established was that local cultures should be "socialist in content but national in form." That is, these cultures should be transformed to conform with the Communist Party's socialist project for the Soviet society as a whole but have active participation and leadership by the indigenous nationalities and operate primarily in the local languages.

During this timeframe, the Ukrainian SSR experienced a language and cultural revival as prior policies prohibiting the use of Ukrainian language were lifted and efforts were made to promote Ukrainian culture.

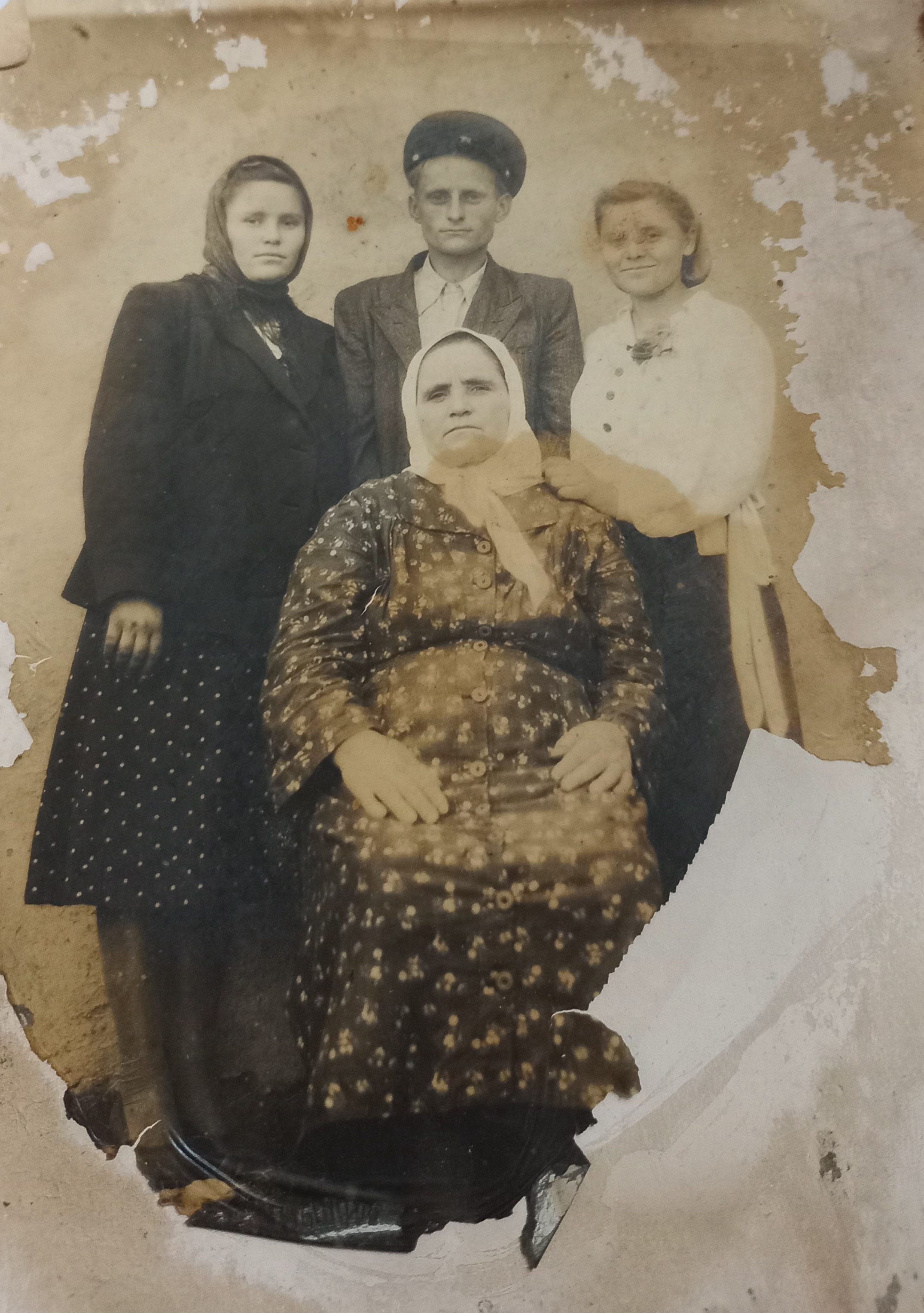
Residents of the village of Novooleksandrivka, Kirovohrad Oblast, Ukrainian SSR; early 1950s. As a result of the dekulakization campaign, which continued even after World War II, almost all traditional folk costumes in the region were destroyed and replaced by clothing conforming to standard all-Soviet styles

Early nationality policies shared with later policy the object of assuring control by the Communist Party over all aspects of Soviet political, economic, and social life. The early Soviet policy of promoting what one scholar has described as "ethnic particularism" and another as "institutionalized multinationality", had a double goal. On the one hand, it had been an effort to counter Russian chauvinism by assuring a place for non-Russian languages and cultures in the newly formed Soviet Union. On the other hand, it was a means to prevent the formation of alternative ethnically based political movements, including pan-Islamism and pan-Turkism. One way of accomplishing this was to promote what some regard as artificial distinctions between ethnic groups and languages rather than promoting the amalgamation of these groups and a common set of languages based on Turkish or another regional language.

The Soviet nationalities policy from its early years sought to counter these two tendencies by assuring a modicum of cultural autonomy to non-Russian nationalities within a federal system or structure of government, though maintaining that the ruling Communist Party was monolithic, not federal. A process of "national-territorial delimitation" (ru:национально-территориальное размежевание) was undertaken to define the official territories of the non-Russian populations within the Soviet Union. The federal system conferred the highest status to the titular nationalities of union republics, and lower status to the titular nationalities of autonomous republics, autonomous provinces, and autonomous okrugs. In all, some 50 nationalities had a republic, province, or okrug of which they held nominal control in the federal system. Federalism and the provision of native-language education ultimately left as a legacy a large non-Russian public that was educated in the languages of their ethnic groups and that identified a particular homeland on the territory of the Soviet Union.

After Stalin begun reversing this policy, Russification of the constituent republics of the USSR intensified, with prominent cultural figures executed. In Ukraine, the Executed Renaissance refers to the many prominent figures during the cultural renaissance under Lenin who were subsequently repressed and executed under the Stalinist government's Russification policy.

==== World War II ====
By the late 1930s, policies had shifted. Purges in some of the national regions, such as Ukraine, had occurred already in the early 1930s. Before the turnabout in Ukraine in 1933, a purge of Veli İbraimov and his leadership in the Crimean ASSR in 1929 for "national deviation" led to the Russianization of government, education, and the media and to the creation of a special alphabet for Crimean Tatar to replace the Latin alphabet. Of the two dangers that Joseph Stalin had identified in 1923, now bourgeois nationalism (local nationalism) was said to be a greater threat than Great Russian chauvinism (great power chauvinism). In 1937, Faizullah Khojaev and Akmal Ikramov were removed as leaders of the Uzbek SSR, and in 1938, during the third great Moscow show trial, convicted and subsequently put to death for alleged anti-Soviet nationalist activities.

After Stalin, an ethnic Georgian, became the undisputed leader of the Soviet Union, the Russian language gained greater emphasis. In 1938, Russian became a required subject of study in every Soviet school, including those in which a non-Russian language was the principal medium of instruction for other subjects (e.g., mathematics, science, and social studies). In 1939, non-Russian languages that had been given Latin-based scripts in the late 1920s were given new scripts based on the Cyrillic script.

Before and during World War II, Joseph Stalin deported to Central Asia and Siberia many entire nationalities for their alleged and largely disproven collaboration with the German invaders: Volga Germans, Crimean Tatars, Chechens, Ingush, Balkars, Kalmyks, and others. Shortly after the war, he deported many Ukrainians, Balts, and Estonians to Siberia as well.

After the war, the leading role of the Russian people in the Soviet family of nations and nationalities was promoted by Stalin and his successors. This shift was most clearly underscored by Communist Party General Secretary Stalin's Victory Day toast to the Russian people in May 1945:

I would like to raise a toast to the health of our Soviet people and, before all, the Russian people. I drink, before all, to the health of the Russian people, because in this war they earned general recognition as the leading force of the Soviet Union among all the nationalities of our country.

The view was reflected in the new State Anthem of the Soviet Union which started with: "An unbreakable union of free republics, Great Russia has sealed forever." Anthems of nearly all Soviet republics mentioned "Russia" or "Russian nation" singled out as "brother", "friend", "elder brother" (Uzbek SSR) or "stronghold of friendship" (Turkmen SSR).

Although the official literature on nationalities and languages in subsequent years continued to speak of there being 130 equal languages in the USSR, in practice a hierarchy was endorsed in which some nationalities and languages were given special roles or viewed as having different long-term futures.

==== Educational reforms ====
An analysis of textbook publishing found that education was offered for at least one year and it was also offered to children who were in at least the first class (grade) in 67 languages between 1934 and 1980. Educational reforms were undertaken after Nikita Khrushchev became First Secretary of the Communist Party in the late 1950s and launched a process of replacing non-Russian schools with Russian ones for the nationalities that had lower status in the federal system, the nationalities whose populations were smaller and the nationalities which were already bilingual on a large scale. Nominally, this process was guided by the principle of "voluntary parental choice." But other factors also came into play, including the size and formal political status of the group in the Soviet federal hierarchy and the prevailing level of bilingualism among parents. By the early 1970s schools in which non-Russian languages served as the principal medium of instruction operated in 45 languages, while seven more indigenous languages were taught as subjects of study for at least one class year. By 1980, instruction was offered in 35 non-Russian languages of the peoples of the USSR, just over half the number in the early 1930s.

In most of these languages, schooling was not offered for the complete ten-year curriculum. For example, within the Russian SFSR in 1958–59, full 10-year schooling in the native language was offered in only three languages: Russian, Tatar, and Bashkir. And some nationalities had minimal or no native-language schooling. By 1962–1963, among non-Russian nationalities that were indigenous to the RSFSR, whereas 27% of children in classes I-IV (primary school) studied in Russian-language schools, 53% of those in classes V-VIII (incomplete secondary school) studied in Russian-language schools, and 66% of those in classes IX-X studied in Russian-language schools. Although many non-Russian languages were still offered as a subject of study at a higher class level (in some cases through complete general secondary school – the 10th class), the pattern of using the Russian language as the main medium of instruction accelerated after Khrushchev's parental choice program got underway.

Pressure to convert the main medium of instruction to Russian was evidently higher in urban areas. For example, in 1961–62, reportedly only 6% of Tatar children living in urban areas attended schools in which Tatar was the main medium of instruction. Similarly in Dagestan in 1965, schools in which the indigenous language was the medium of instruction existed only in rural areas. The pattern was probably similar, if less extreme, in most of the non-Russian union republics, although in Belarus and Ukraine, schooling in urban areas was highly Russianized.

==== Rapprochement ====
The promotion of federalism and of non-Russian languages had always been a strategic decision aimed at expanding and maintaining Communist Party rule. On the theoretical plane, the Communist Party's official doctrine was of eventual national differences and nationalities as such would disappear. In official party doctrine as it was reformulated in the Third Program of the Communist Party of the Soviet Union introduced by Nikita Khrushchev at the 22nd Party Congress in 1961, although the program stated that ethnic distinctions would eventually disappear and a single common language would be adopted by all nationalities in the Soviet Union, "the obliteration of national distinctions, and especially language distinctions, is a considerably more drawn-out process than the obliteration of class distinctions." At the time, Soviet nations and nationalities were further flowering their cultures and drawing together (сближение – sblizhenie) into a stronger union. In his Report on the Program to the Congress, Khrushchev used even stronger language: that the process of further rapprochement (sblizhenie) and greater unity of nations would eventually lead to a merging or fusion (слияние – sliyanie) of nationalities.

Khrushchev's formula of rapprochement-fusing was moderated slightly when Leonid Brezhnev replaced Khrushchev as General Secretary of the Communist Party in 1964 (a post he held until his death in 1982). Brezhnev asserted that rapprochement would lead ultimately to the complete unity of nationalities. "Unity" is an ambiguous term because it can imply either the maintenance of separate national identities but a higher stage of mutual attraction, similarity between nationalities or total disappearance of ethnic differences. In the political context of the time, rapprochement-unity was regarded as a softening of the pressure toward Russification that Khrushchev had promoted with his endorsement of sliyanie.

The 24th Party Congress in 1971 launched the idea that a new "Soviet people" was forming on the territory of the USSR, a community for which the common language – the language of the "Soviet people" – was the Russian language, consistent with the role that Russian was playing for the fraternal nations and nationalities in the territory already. This new community was labeled a people (народ – narod), not a nation (нация – natsiya), but in that context the Russian word narod ("people") implied an ethnic community, not just a civic or political community.

October 13, 1978, the Soviet Council of Ministers enacted (but did not officially publish) 1978 Decree No. 835, titled "On measures to further improve the teaching and learning of the Russian language in the Union Republics", directing mandating the teaching of Russian, starting in first grade, in the other 14 Republics. The new rule was accompanied by a statement that Russian was a "second native language" for all Soviet citizens and "the only means of participation in social life across the nation." The Councils of Ministers of the Republics across the USSR enacted resolutions based on Decree No. 835. Other aspects of Russification contemplated that native languages would gradually be removed from newspapers, radio and television in favor of Russian.

Thus, until the end of the Soviet era, doctrinal rationalization had been provided for some of the practical policy steps that were taken in the areas of education and the media. First of all, the transfer of many "national schools" (schools based on local languages) to Russian as a medium of instruction accelerated under Khrushchev in the late 1950s and continued into the 1980s.

Second, the new doctrine was used to justify the special place of the Russian language as the "language of inter-nationality communication" (язык межнационального общения) in the USSR. Use of the term "inter-nationality" (межнациональное) rather than the more conventional "international" (международное) focused on the special internal role of Russian language rather than on its role as a language of international discourse. That Russian was the most widely spoken language, and that Russians were the majority of the population of the country, were also cited in justification of the special place of the Russian language in government, education, and the media.

At the 27th CPSU Party Congress in 1986, presided over by Mikhail Gorbachev, the 4th Party Program reiterated the formulas of the previous program:

Characteristic of the national relations in our country are both the continued flourishing of the nations and nationalities and the fact that they are steadily and voluntarily drawing closer together on the basis of equality and fraternal cooperation. Neither artificial prodding nor holding back of the objective trends of development is admissible here. In the long term historical perspective, this development will lead to complete unity of the nations.... The equal right of all citizens of the USSR to use their native languages and the free development of these languages will be ensured in the future as well. At the same time learning the Russian language, which has been voluntarily accepted by the Soviet people as a medium of communication between different nationalities, besides the language of one's nationality, broadens one's access to the achievements of science and technology and of Soviet and world culture.

During the Soviet era, a significant number of ethnic Russians and Ukrainians migrated to other Soviet republics, and many of them settled there. According to the last census in 1989, the Russian 'diaspora' in the non-Russian Soviet republics had reached 25 million.

==== Linguistics ====
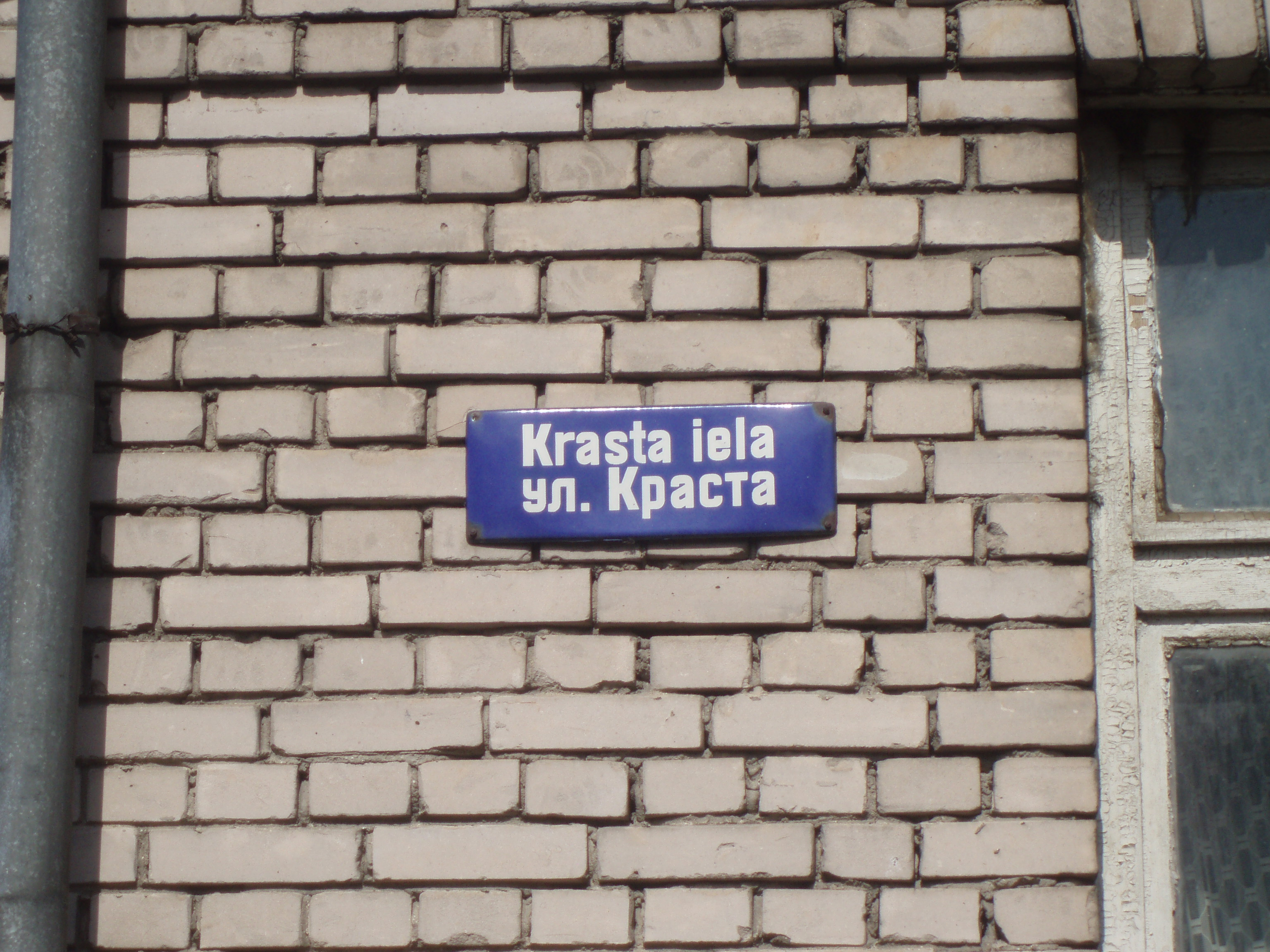
A remnant of linguistic Russification in Latvia – a Soviet bilingual (Latvian-Russian) street sign in Rēzekne in 2011

Progress in the spread of the Russian language as a second language and the gradual displacement of other languages was monitored in Soviet censuses. The Soviet censuses of 1926, 1937, 1939, and 1959, had included questions on "native language" (родной язык) as well as "nationality." The 1970, 1979, and 1989 censuses added to these questions one on "other language of the peoples of the USSR" that an individual could "use fluently" (свободно владеть). It is speculated that the explicit goal of the new question on the "second language" was to monitor the spread of Russian as the language of internationality communication.

Each of the official homelands within the Soviet Union was regarded as the only homeland of the titular nationality and its language, while the Russian language was regarded as the language for interethnic communication for the whole Soviet Union. Therefore, for most of the Soviet era, especially after the korenizatsiya (indigenization) policy ended in the 1930s, schools in which non-Russian Soviet languages would be taught were not generally available outside the respective ethnically based administrative units of these ethnicities. Some exceptions appeared to involve cases of historic rivalries or patterns of assimilation between neighboring non-Russian groups, such as between Tatars and Bashkirs in Russia or among major Central Asian nationalities. For example, even in the 1970s schooling was offered in at least seven languages in Uzbekistan: Russian, Uzbek, Tajik, Kazakh, Turkmen, Kyrgyz, and Karakalpak.

While formally all languages were equal, in almost all Soviet republics the Russian/local bilingualism was "asymmetric": the titular nation learned Russian, whereas immigrant Russians generally did not learn the local language.

In addition, many non-Russians who lived outside their respective administrative units tended to become Russified linguistically; that is, they not only learned Russian as a second language but they also adopted it as their home language or mother tongue – although some still retained their sense of ethnic identity or origins even after shifting their native language to Russian. This includes both the traditional communities (e.g., Lithuanians in the northwestern Belarus (see Eastern Vilnius region) or the Kaliningrad Oblast (see Lithuania Minor)) and the communities that appeared during Soviet times such as Ukrainian or Belarusian workers in Kazakhstan or Latvia, whose children attended primarily the Russian-language schools and thus the further generations are primarily speaking Russian as their native language; for example, 57% of Estonia's Ukrainians, 70% of Estonia's Belarusians and 37% of Estonia's Latvians claimed Russian as the native language in the last Soviet census of 1989. Russian replaced Yiddish and other languages as the main language of many Jewish communities inside the Soviet Union as well.

Another consequence of the mixing of nationalities and the spread of bilingualism and linguistic Russification was the growth of ethnic intermarriage and a process of ethnic Russification—coming to call oneself Russian by nationality or ethnicity, not just speaking Russian as a second language or using it as a primary language. In the last decades of the Soviet Union, ethnic Russification (or ethnic assimilation) was moving very rapidly for a few nationalities such as the Karelians and Mordvinians. Whether children born in mixed families to one Russian parent were likely to be raised as Russians depended on the context. For example, the majority of children in North Kazakhstan with one of each parent chose Russian as their nationality on their internal passport at age 16. Children of mixed Russian and Estonian parents living in Tallinn (the capital city of Estonia), or mixed Russian and Latvian parents living in Riga (the capital of Latvia), or mixed Russian and Lithuanian parents living in Vilnius (the capital of Lithuania) most often chose as their own nationality that of the titular nationality of their republic – not Russian.

More generally, patterns of linguistic and ethnic assimilation (Russification) were complex and cannot be accounted for by any single factor such as educational policy. Also relevant were the traditional cultures and religions of the groups, their residence in urban or rural areas, their contact with and exposure to the Russian language and to ethnic Russians, and other factors.

=== In the Russian Federation (1991–present) ===
The enforced Russification of Russia's remaining indigenous minorities continued in Russia after the collapse of the Soviet Union, especially in connection with urbanization and the declining population replacement rates, which are particularly low among the groups in the western Russia. As a result, several of Russia's indigenous languages and cultures are currently considered endangered. Between the 1989 and 2002 censuses, over 100,000 Mordvins assimilated; as the Mordvin population totaled less than one million, this was considered a major loss.

On 19 June 2018, the Russian State Duma adopted a bill that made education in all languages but Russian optional, overruling previous laws by ethnic autonomies, and reducing instruction in minority languages to only two hours a week. This bill has been likened by some commentators, such as in Foreign Affairs, to the policy of Russification.

When the bill was still being considered, advocates for minorities warned that the bill could endanger their languages and traditional cultures. The law came after a lawsuit in the summer of 2017, when a Russian mother allegedly claimed that her son had been "materially harmed" by learning the Tatar language; commenting on this in a speech, Putin argued that it was wrong to force someone to learn a language that is not their own. The later "language crackdown", in which autonomous units were forced to stop mandatory hours of native languages, was also seen as a move by Putin to "build identity in Russian society".

Protests and petitions against the bill by civic society, groups of public intellectuals, and regional governments came from Tatarstan (with attempts for demonstrations suppressed), Chuvashia, Mari El, North Ossetia, Kabardino-Balkaria, the Karachays, the Kumyks, the Avars, Chechnya, and Ingushetia. Although the Duma representatives from the Caucasus did not oppose the bill, it prompted a large outcry in the North Caucasus, with representatives from the region being accused of cowardice. The law was also seen as possibly destabilizing, threatening ethnic relations and revitalizing the various North Caucasian nationalist movements. The International Circassian Organization called for the law to be rescinded before it came into effect. Twelve of Russia's ethnic autonomies, including five in the Caucasus called for the legislation to be blocked.

On 10 September 2019, Udmurt activist Albert Razin self-immolated in front of the regional government building in Izhevsk as it was considering passing the controversial bill to reduce the status of the Udmurt language. Between 2002 and 2010 the number of Udmurt speakers dwindled from 463,000 to 324,000. Other languages in the Volga region recorded similar declines in the number of speakers; between the 2002 and 2010 censuses the number of Mari speakers declined from 254,000 to 204,000 while Chuvash recorded only 1,042,989 speakers in 2010, a 21.6% drop from 2002. This is attributed to a gradual phasing out of indigenous language teaching both in the cities and rural areas while regional media and governments shift exclusively to Russian.

In the North Caucasus, the law came after a decade in which educational opportunities in the indigenous languages was reduced by more than 50%, due to budget reductions and federal efforts to decrease the role of languages other than Russian. During this period, numerous indigenous languages in the North Caucasus showed significant decreases in their numbers of speakers even though the numbers of the corresponding nationalities increased, leading to fears of language replacement. The numbers of Ossetian, Kumyk and Avar speakers dropped by 43,000, 63,000 and 80,000 respectively. As of 2018, it has been reported that the North Caucasus is nearly devoid of schools that teach primarily their native languages, with the exception of one school in North Ossetia, and a few in rural regions of Dagestan; this phenomenon has occurred even in largely monoethnic Chechnya and Ingushetia. Chechen and Ingush are still used as languages of everyday communication to a greater degree than their North Caucasian neighbours, but sociolinguists argue that the current situation will lead to their degradation relative to Russian.

In 2020, a set of amendments to the Russian constitution was approved by the State Duma and later the Federation Council. One of the amendments enshrined the Russian nation as the "state-forming nationality" (Russian: государствообразующий народ) and Russian the “language of the state-forming nationality”. The amendment has been met with criticism from Russia's minorities who argue that it goes against the principle that Russia is a multinational state and will only marginalize them further. The amendments were welcomed by Russian nationalists, such as Konstantin Malofeev and Nikolai Starikov. The changes in Constitution were preceded by "Strategy of government's national policy of Russian Federation", issued in December 2018, which stated that "all-Russian civic identity is founded on Russia cultural dominant, inherent to all nations of Russian Federation".

With the release of the latest census in 2022, results showed a catastrophic decline in the number of many ethnic groups, particularly peoples of the Volga region. Between 2010 and 2022, the number of people identifying as ethnic Mari dropped by 22.6%, from 548,000 to 424,000 people. Ethnic Chuvash and Udmurts dropped by 25% and 30% respectively. More vulnerable groups like the Mordvins and Komi-Permyaks saw even larger declines, dropping by 35% and 40% respectively, the former of which resulted in Mordvins no longer being among the top ten largest ethnic groups in Russia.

On 18 June 2025, the Russian Ministry of Education issued Order No. 467 on elementary education (grades 1-9). which turned the teaching of Russia's minority languages (school subject 'Mother Tongue') into electives. This order also makes the school subject 'Literature in the Mother Tongue' elective as well. The order was enforced on 1 September 2025, with the changes applied starting from the 2026/27 school year. In the context of these changes, the ministry aspires to remove specifically Ukrainian language and literature as school subjects. This measure de facto pertains to the Ukrainian territories under Russian occupation. The order also reduced the number of hours minority languages are taught at school, which became a controversial issue in Tatarstan.

== By country/region ==
=== Azerbaijan ===
Russia was introduced to the South Caucasus following its colonisation in the first half of the nineteenth century after Qajar Iran was forced to cede its Caucasian territories per the Treaty of Gulistan and Treaty of Turkmenchay in 1813 and 1828 respectively to Russia. By 1830 there were schools with Russian as the language of instruction in the cities of Shusha, Baku, Yelisavetpol (Ganja), and Shemakha (Shamakhi); later such schools were established in Kuba (Quba), Ordubad, and Zakataly (Zaqatala). Education in Russian was unpopular amongst ethnic Azerbaijanis until 1887 when Habib bey Mahmudbeyov and Sultan Majid Ganizadeh founded the first Russian–Azerbaijani school in Baku. A secular school with instruction in both Russian and Azeri, its programs were designed to be consistent with the cultural values and traditions of the Muslim population. Eventually, 240 such schools for both boys and girls, including a women's college founded in 1901, were established prior to the "Sovietization" of the South Caucasus. The first Russian-Azeri reference library opened in 1894. In 1918, during the short period of Azerbaijan's independence, the government declared Azeri the official language, but the use of Russian in government documents was permitted until all civil servants mastered the official language.

In the Soviet era, the large Russian population of Baku, the quality and prospects of education in Russia, increased access to Russian literature, and other factors contributed to the intensive Russification of Baku's population. Its direct result by the mid-twentieth century was the formation of a supra-ethnic urban Baku subculture, uniting people of Russian, Azerbaijani, Armenian, Jewish, and other origins and whose special features were being cosmopolitan and Russian-speaking. The widespread use of Russian resulted in a phenomenon of 'Russian-speaking Azeris', i.e. an emergence of an urban community of Azerbaijani-born ethnic Azeris who considered Russian their native language. In 1970, 57,500 Azeris (1.3%) identified Russian as their native language.

=== Belarus ===
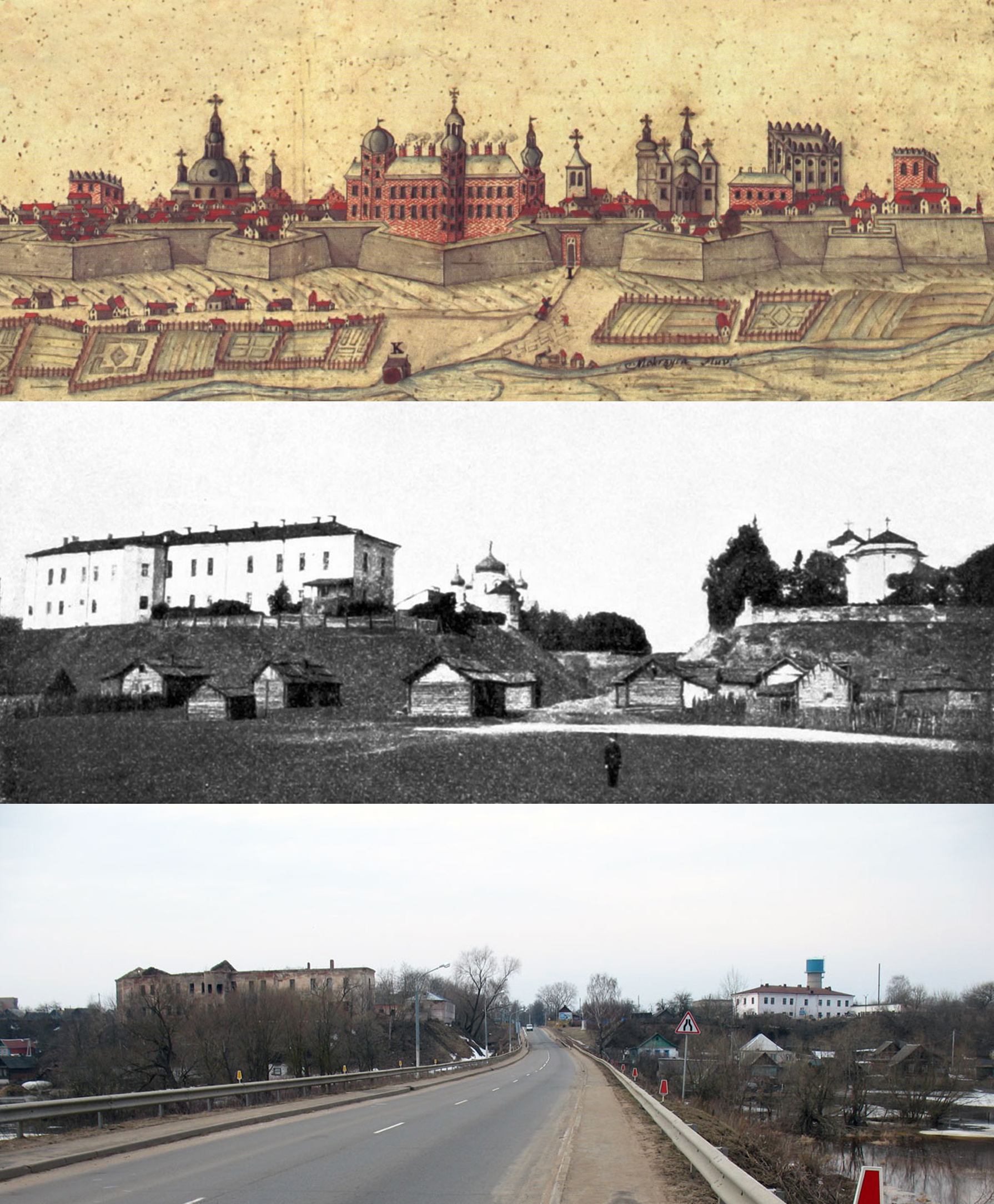
Russification of the Bykhaw city. The entire architectural heritage of the Grand Duchy of Lithuania was destroyed under the rule of Russian Empire and Soviet Union. Below is a modern view of the city center.

Russian and Soviet authorities conducted policies of Russification of Belarus from 1772 to 1991, interrupted by the Belarusization policy in the 1920s.

When the pro-Russian president Alexander Lukashenko gained power in 1994, the Russification policy was renewed.

=== Finland ===
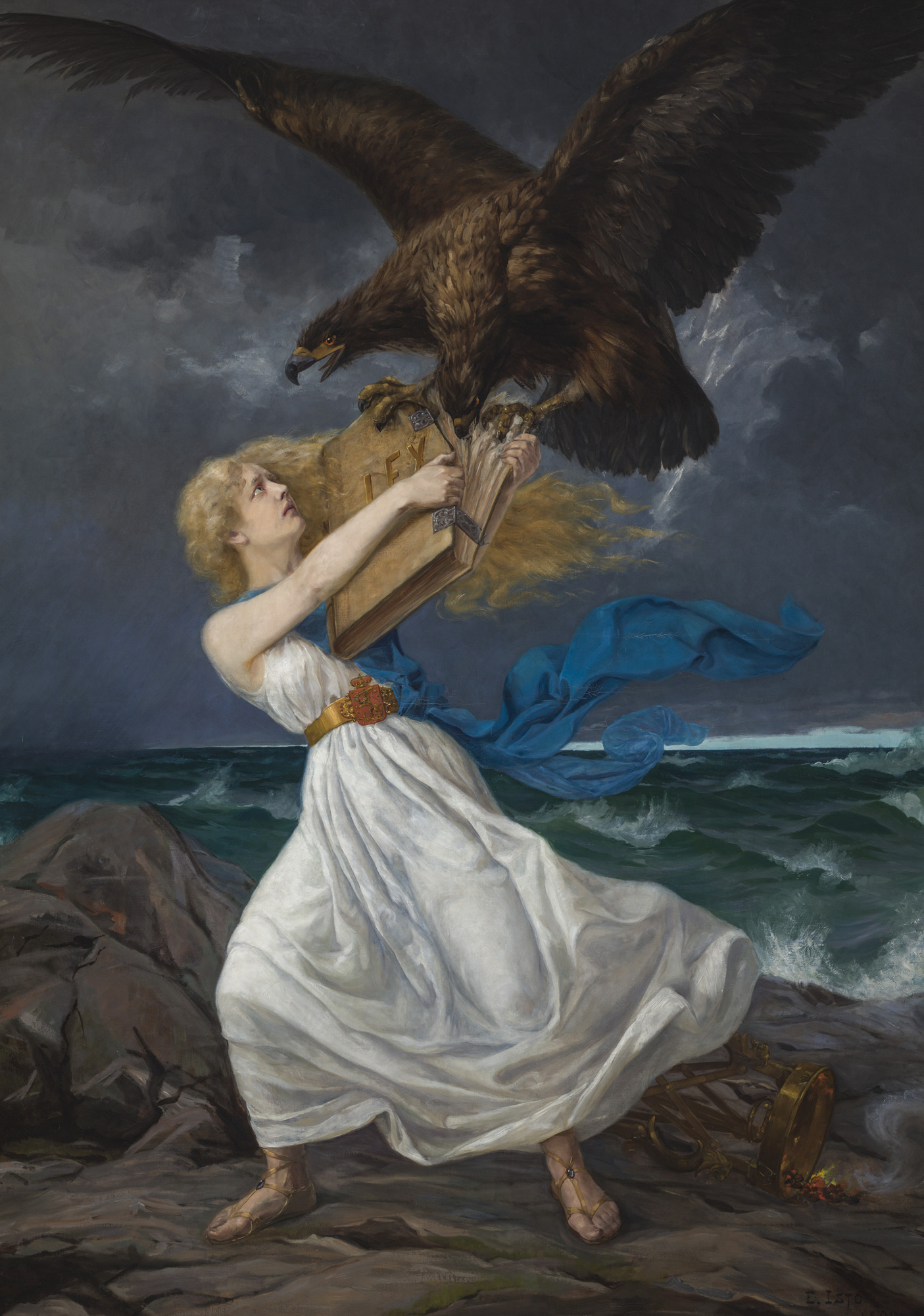
The Attack (Hyökkäys), Edvard Isto (1899), symbolically depicting the Russification of Finland

The Russification of Finland (1899–1905, 1908–1917), "times of oppression" (sortokaudet in Finnish, förtrycksperioden in Swedish) was a governmental policy of the Russian Empire aimed at the termination of Finland's autonomy. Finnish opposition to Russification was one of the main factors that ultimately led to Finland's declaration of independence in 1917.

=== Estonia ===
For many centuries, Estonians and Russians lived side by side, but due to deep linguistic and cultural differences, they had little contact. The first significant contact occurred in the 18th century when Russia arrived on Estonian lands as a conqueror.

- 1721. After the Great Northern War, Estonia became part of the Russian Empire. Russian was introduced as the administrative language, but its impact on the population remained limited.
- 1819. The demand for the abolition of serfdom was met— the first such instance in the Russian Empire (it was abolished empire-wide in 1861). This spurred urbanization and the national awakening of Estonians.
- 1881. Following the ascension of Alexander III, harsh Russification began. Estonian laws were replaced with Russian ones, schools mandated Russian-language instruction, and teaching in Estonian was banned.
- 1893. Russification of Tartu University, the country’s main educational institution—education fully shifted from German to Russian. Estonian books were destroyed.
- 1895–1905. Russian was introduced in courts, police, and municipalities.

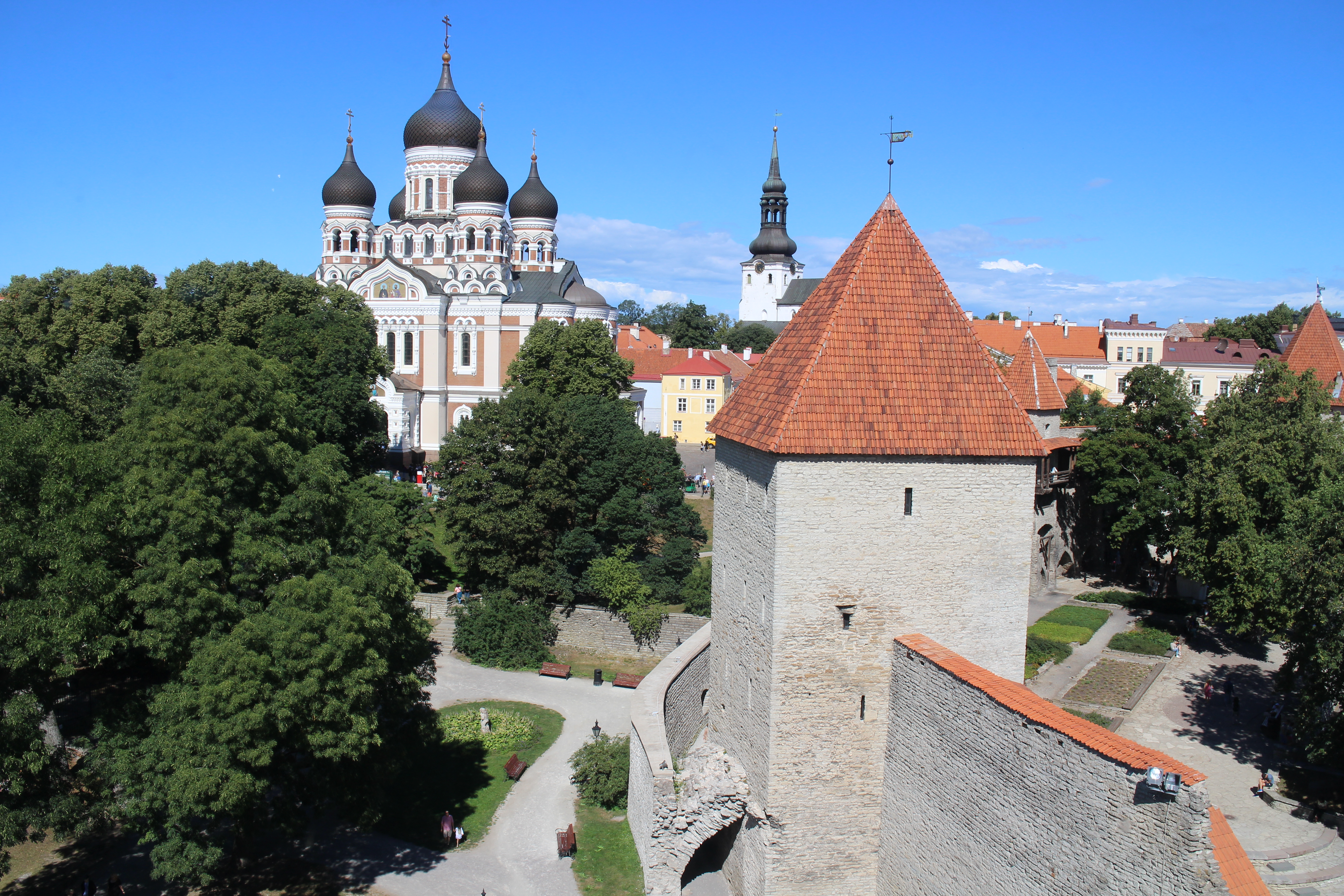
Russian church in Tallinn

- 1905–1907. During the Russian Revolution of 1905, Estonians demanded independence. The Russian authorities responded with political repression, public executions of demonstrators, and a series of deportations of Estonians to Russia’s interior regions.
- 1918–1920. Estonia won its War of Independence and gained independence. Russification ceased, and Estonian became the sole state language. At that time, Russians made up only 8% of Estonia’s population.
- 1940. Soviet invasion (June 16). A puppet government was established, and Estonia was annexed to the USSR on August 6 after sham “elections.” Mass repressions began immediately: within the first month, Soviet special forces arrested 60,000 people.
- 1944. After World War II, the USSR continued Russification. On Stalin’s personal orders, Soviet special forces executed the entire Estonian parliament. Over the following decades, all peaceful protests for independence were suppressed. Under Stalin, protesters were either killed or sent to Gulag camps. In the later Soviet period (1960–1980), they were imprisoned or confined to psychiatric hospitals.
- 1988. The Singing Revolution — mass demonstrations for independence. This tradition is still celebrated as National Remembrance Day (Öölaulupidu). Estonians sang national and patriotic songs, accelerating the collapse of the USSR and the restoration of independence in 1991.

=== East Prussia ===
The Northern part of the German province of East Prussia was annexed by the Soviet Union to RSFSR after World War II becoming the Kaliningrad Oblast. While the former German population was expelled or deported to the Soviet Union for forced labor, a systematic settlement of the Kaliningrad Oblast with Russians, Belarusians, and Ukrainians took place. Almost all cultural assets reminiscent of the Germans (e.g., churches, castles, palaces, monuments, drainage systems, etc.) were demolished or left to decay. All settlements were given names in the Russian language, the same for bodies of water, forests and other geographical features. Northern East Prussia was completely Russified.

=== Latvia ===
On September 14, 1885, an ukaz was signed by Alexander III setting the mandatory use of Russian for Baltic governorate officials. In 1889, it was extended to apply to official proceedings of the Baltic municipal governments as well. By the beginning of the 1890s, Russian was enforced as the language of instruction in Baltic governorate schools.

After Soviet re-occupation of Latvia in 1944, Russian became the language of State business, and Russian served as the language of inter-ethnic communication among the increasingly urbanized non-Russian ethnic groups, making cities major centres for the use of the Russian language and making functional bilingualism in Russian a minimum necessary for the local population.

In an attempt to partially reverse the Soviet Russification policies and give the Latvian language more equal positions to Russian, the so-called Latvian national communist faction within the Communist Party of Latvia passed a bill in 1957 that made the knowledge of both Latvian and Russian obligatory for all Communist Party employees, government functionaries, and service sector staff. The law included a 2-year deadline for gaining proficiency in both languages.

In 1958, as the two-year deadline for the bill was approaching, the Communist Party of the Soviet Union set out to enact an education reform, a component of which, the so-called Thesis 19, would give parents in all of the Soviet Republics, with the exception of Russian SFSR, a choice for their children in public schools to study either the language of the republic's titular nation (in this case Latvian) or Russian, as well as one foreign language, in contrast, to the previous education system, where it was mandatory for school children to learn all three languages.

Due to strong opposition from the Latvian national communists and the Latvian public, Latvian SSR was only one of two of the 12 Soviet Republics that did not yield to the increasing pressure to adopt Thesis 19 and excluded its contents from their ratified statutes. This led to the eventual purge of the Latvian national communists from the Communist Party ranks between 1959 and 1962. A month after the removal of the Latvian National Communist leader Eduards Berklavs All-Union legislation was implemented in Latvia by Arvīds Pelše.

In an attempt to further widen the use of Russian and reverse the work of the national communists, a bilingual school system was established in Latvia, with parallel classes being taught in both Russian and Latvian. The number of such schools increased dramatically, including regions where the Russian population was minimal, and by July 1963 there were already 240 bilingual schools.

The effect of the reform was the gradual decline in the number of assigned hours for learning Latvian in Russian schools and the increase in hours allocated for learning Russian in Latvian schools. In 1964–1965 the total weekly average of Latvian language classes and Russian language and literature classes in Latvian schools across all grades was reported to be 38.5 and 72.5 hours respectively, in comparison with 79 hours being devoted to the Russian language and 26 hours being devoted to Latvian language and literature in Russian schools. The reform has been attributed to the persistence of poor Latvian language knowledge among Russians living in Latvia and the increasing language gap between Latvians and Russians.

In 1972, the Letter of 17 Latvian communists, was smuggled outside the Latvian SSR and circulated in the Western world, accusing the Communist Party of the Soviet Union of "Great Russian chauvinism" and "progressive Russification of all life in Latvia":

The first main task is to transfer from Russia, Belorussia, and the Ukraine as many Russians, Belorussians and Ukrainians as possible, and to resettle them permanently in Latvia (...) Now the republic already has a number of large enterprises where there are almost no Latvians among the workers, engineering-technical personnel, and directors (...); there are also those where most of the workers are Latvians, but none of the executives understands Latvian (...) About 65% of the doctors working in municipal health institutions do not speak Latvian (...) Demands of the newcomers to increase Russian-language radio and television broadcasts in the republic are being satisfied. At the present time one radio program and one television program is broadcast entirely in Russian, and the other program is mixed. Thus about two-thirds of the radio and television broadcasts in the republic are in Russian. (...) about half of the periodicals published in Latvia are in Russian anyway. Works of Latvian writers and school textbooks in Latvian cannot be published, because there is a lack of paper, but books written by Russian authors and school textbooks in Russian are published. (..) There are many collectives where Latvians have an absolute majority. Nevertheless, if there is a single Russian in the collective, he will demand that the meeting be conducted in Russian, and his demand will be satisfied. If this is not done, then the collective is accused of nationalism.

=== Lithuania and Poland ===
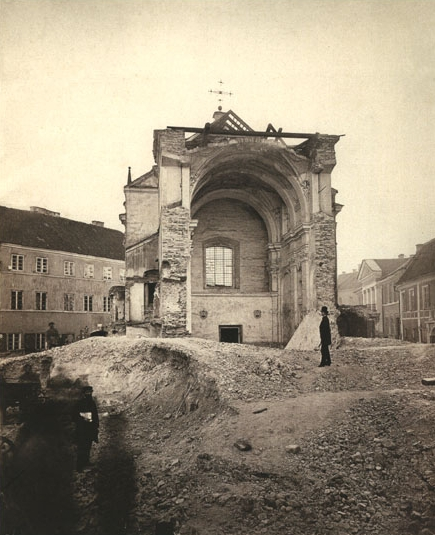
Church of St. Joseph the Betrothed demolished by the order of authorities in Vilnius, 1877

In the 19th century, the Russian Empire strove to replace the Ukrainian, Polish, Lithuanian, and Belarusian languages and dialects with Russian in those areas, which were annexed by the Russian Empire after the Partitions of Poland (1772–1795) and the Congress of Vienna (1815). Imperial Russia faced a crucial critical cultural situation by 1815:

Large sections of Russian society had come under the foreign influence as a result of the Napoleonic wars and appeared open to change. As a consequence of absorbing so much Polish territory, by 1815 no less than 64 percent of the nobility of the Romanov realm was of Polish descent, and since there were more literate Poles than Russians, more people within it could read and write Polish than Russian. The third largest city, Vilnius, was entirely Polish in character and its university was the best in the Empire.

Russification in Congress Poland intensified after the November Uprising of 1831, and in particular after the January Uprising of 1863. In 1864, the Polish and Belarusian languages were banned in public places; in the 1880s, Polish was banned in schools, on school grounds, and in the offices of Congress Poland. Research and teaching of the Polish language, Polish history, or Catholicism were forbidden. Illiteracy rose as Poles refused to learn Russian. Students were beaten for resisting Russification. A Polish underground education network was formed, including the famous Flying University. According to Russian estimates, by the start of the 20th century, around one-third of the inhabitants in the territory of Congress Poland participated in secret teaching with use of Polish literary works.

Starting in the 1840s, Russia considered introducing Cyrillic script for spelling the Polish language, with the first school books printed in the 1860s; the reform was eventually deemed unnecessary because of the introduction of school education in the Russian language.

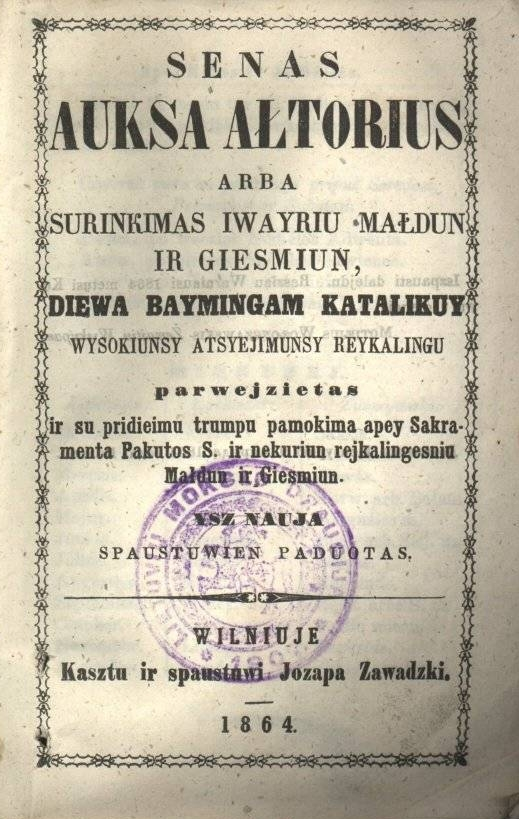
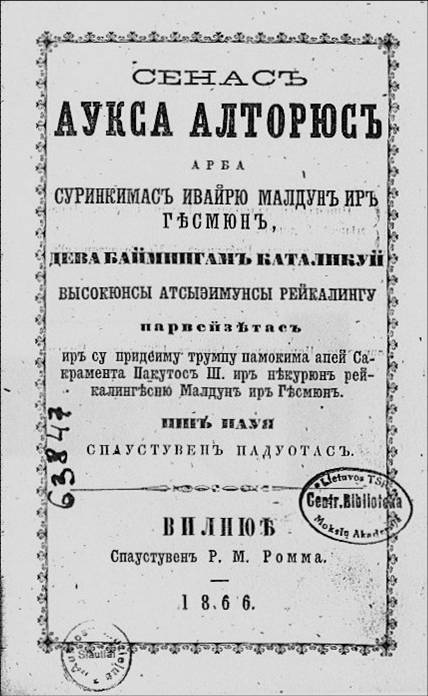
Two issues of the same popular Lithuanian prayer book Auksa altorius (Golden Altar). Under the Lithuanian press ban, the version on the left was illegal from 1865 to 1904 because it was printed in the Latin alphabet. The one on the right in Cyrillic was legal and paid for by the government.

A similar development took place in Lithuania. Its Governor General, Mikhail Muravyov (in office 1863–1865), prohibited the public use of spoken Polish and Lithuanian and closed Polish and Lithuanian schools; teachers from other parts of Russia who did not speak these languages were moved in to teach pupils. This prompted Lithuanians to establish numerous clandestine schools. Muravyov also banned the use of Latin and Gothic scripts in publishing. This ban, lifted only in 1904, was disregarded by the knygnešiai, the Lithuanian book smugglers, who brought Lithuanian publications printed in the Latin alphabet, the historic orthography of the Lithuanian language, from Lithuania Minor (part of East Prussia) and from the United States into the Lithuanian-speaking areas of Imperial Russia. The knygnešiai came to symbolise the resistance of Lithuanians against Russification. Later on, the language policies in Lithuania and Poland shifted towards better education in Russian. Ivan Petrovich Kornilov, an Imperial Russian official, wrote in 1897:

Russian: Русское образованiе сильнѣе русскаго штыка. Въ какiе-нибудь 4 года русскiя школы сдѣлали болѣе для образованiя народа и ослабленiя полонизма, чѣмъ войска въ десятки лѣтъ.

[Russian education is stronger than the Russian bayonet. In about 4 years Russian schools did more for the people's education and weakening of the Polonization than troops in tens of years.]

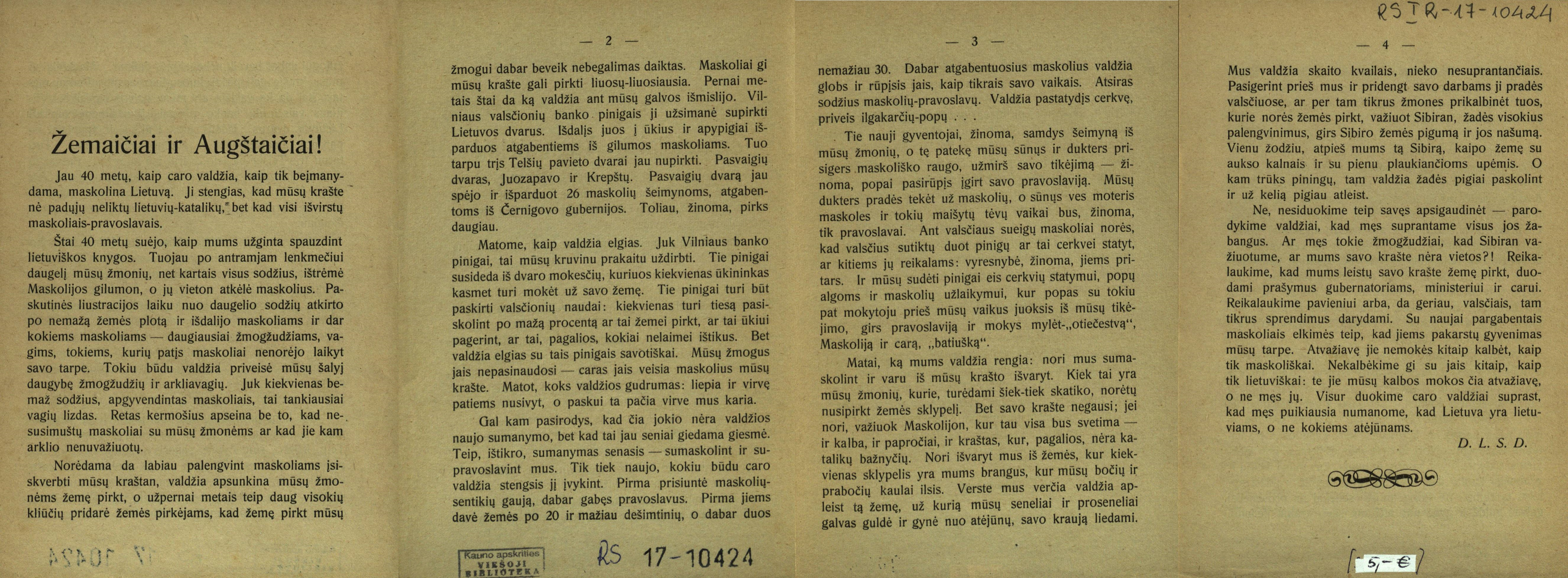
Appeal explaining the policy of Muscovization conducted by the tsarist government, sending Lithuanian peasants to Muscovia, and settling Lithuanian villages with Muscovite families, calling for opposition to it, 1904

The Russification campaign also promoted the Russian Orthodox faith over Catholicism. The measures used included closing down Catholic monasteries, officially banning the building of new churches and giving many of the old ones to the Russian Orthodox church, banning Catholic schools and establishing state schools that taught only the Orthodox religion, requiring Catholic priests to preach only officially approved sermons, requiring that Catholics who married members of the Orthodox church convert, requiring Catholic nobles to pay an additional tax in the amount of 10% of their profits, limiting the amount of land a Catholic peasant could own, and switching from the Gregorian calendar (used by Catholics) to the Julian one (used by members of the Orthodox church).

Most of the Orthodox Church property in the 19th century Congress Poland was acquired at the expense of the Catholic Church of both rites (Roman and Greek Catholic).

After the 1863 January Uprising, many manors and great chunks of land were confiscated from nobles of Polish and Lithuanian descent who were accused of helping the uprising; these properties were later given or sold to Russian nobles. Villages where supporters of the uprising lived were repopulated by ethnic Russians. Vilnius University, where the language of instruction had been Polish rather than Russian, closed in 1832. Lithuanians and Poles were banned from holding any public jobs (including professional positions, such as teachers and doctors) in Lithuania; this forced educated Lithuanians to move to other parts of the Russian Empire. The old legal code was dismantled and a new one based on the Russian code and written in the Russian language was enacted; Russian became the only administrative and juridical language in the area. Most of these actions ended at the beginning of the Russo-Japanese War of 1904–1905, but others took longer to be reversed; Vilnius University re-opened only after Russia had lost control of the city in 1919.

=== Bessarabia/Moldova ===
Bessarabia was annexed by the Russian Empire in 1812. In 1816 Bessarabia became an autonomous state, but only until 1828. In 1829, the use of the Romanian language was forbidden in the administration. In 1833, the use of the Romanian language was forbidden in churches. In 1842, teaching in Romanian was forbidden in secondary schools; it was forbidden in elementary schools in 1860.

The Russian authorities encouraged the migration of Moldovans to other provinces of the Russian Empire (especially in Kuban, Kazakhstan, and Siberia), while foreign ethnic groups (especially Russians and Ukrainians, called in the 19th century "Little Russians") were encouraged to settle there. Though the 1817 census did not record ethnicity, Romanian authors have claimed that Bessarabia was populated at the time by 86% Moldovans, 6.5% Ukrainians, 1.5% Russians (Lipovans), and 6% other ethnic groups. 80 years later, in 1897, the ethnic structure was very different: only 56% Moldovans, but 11.7% Ukrainians, 18.9% Russians, and 13.4% other ethnic groups. During 80 years, between 1817 and 1897, the share of the Moldovan population dropped by 30%.

After the Soviet occupation of Bessarabia in 1940, the Romanian population of Bessarabia was persecuted by Soviet authorities, especially in the years following the annexation, based mostly on social, educational, and political grounds; because of this, Russification laws were imposed again on the Romanian population. The Moldovan language promoted during the Interwar period by the Soviet authorities first in the Moldavian Autonomous Soviet Socialist Republic, and after 1940 taught in the Moldavian Soviet Socialist Republic, was actually the Romanian language but written with a version of the Cyrillic script derived from the Russian alphabet. Proponents of Cyrillic orthography argue that the Romanian language was historically written with the Cyrillic script, albeit a different version of it (see Moldovan alphabet and Romanian Cyrillic alphabet for a discussion of this controversy).

=== Ukraine ===
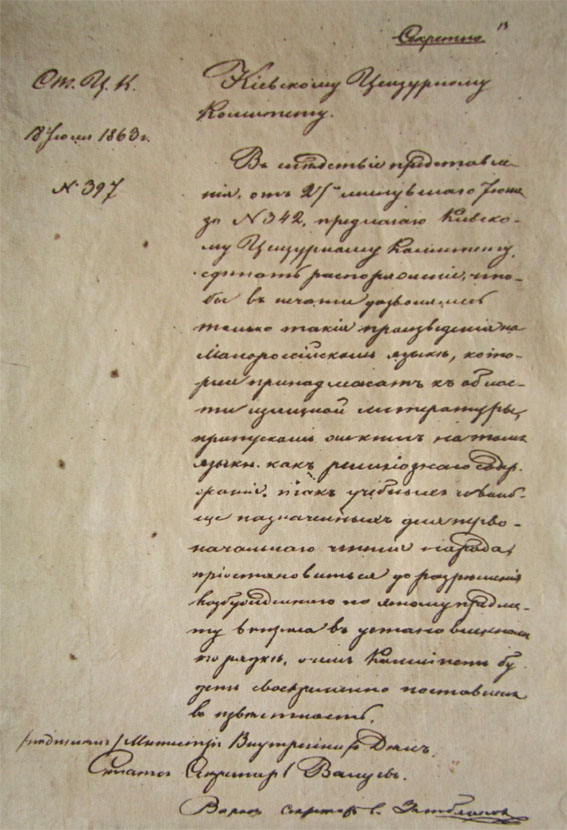
The Valuev Circular of 1863, was designed to eradicate the usage of the Ukrainian language.

Russian and Soviet authorities conducted policies of Russification of Ukraine from 1709 to 1991, interrupted by the Korenizatsiya policy in the 1920s. Since Ukraine's independence, its government has implemented Ukrainization policies to decrease the use of Russian and favour Ukrainian. The Russification policy included various instruments, most notably an explicit ban on using Ukrainian language in print or importing literature, staging plays or lectures in Ukrainian from 1876 (Ems Ukaz).

A number of Ukrainian activists died by suicide in protest against Russification, including Vasyl Makukh in 1968 and Oleksa Hirnyk in 1978.

Following the 2014 Russian annexation of Crimea and the emergence of unrecognized Russian-backed entities in Eastern Ukraine, a form of Russification was initiated, despite these areas being predominantly Russian-speaking.

== See also ==
- Geographical distribution of Russian speakers
- Territorial evolution of Russia
- Orthodoxy, Autocracy, and Nationality – Ideological doctrine of Nicholas I of Russia
- Education in the Soviet Union – Overview of education in Soviet Union
- Slavophilia – Intellectual movement in Russia opposed to Western European influences
- Population transfer in the Soviet Union – Transfer and deportation of people in the Soviet Union
- Russian diaspora – Community of Russian emigrants
- Russian imperialism
- Russian nationalism – Russian political ideology
- Sovietization – Adoption of Soviet political system and mentality
- Z (military symbol) – Russian military and propaganda symbol
- On Approving the Fundamentals of State Policy for the Preservation and Strengthening of Traditional Russian Spiritual and Moral Values – Russian decree promoting traditional values
