= Alena Poláčková =

Slovak judge

Judge at the European Court of Human Rights
- In office 2015–2025
- Preceded by: Ján Šikuta

Personal details
- Born: Alena Poláčková; 6 November 1964 (age 61) Bojnice, Czechoslovakia
- Education: Comenius University

Alena Poláčková (born 6 November 1964 Bojnice, Slovakia) is a Slovak jurist and was a judge at the European Court of Human Rights.

== Education ==
In 1982 she enrolled in Faculty of Law of the Comenius University in Bratislava, from where she graduated with a MSc in 1988. Between 1991 and 1994, she assisted a judge at the regional Court of Bratislava. In 1996 she returned to the Comenius University from where she received her PhD in 2001.

== Professional career ==
Following her graduation in 1988, she taught law at the Secondary Economic school until 1991. In 1991 she entered the public administration and was assigned as a judge in the Slovak Ministry of Justice. Between 1994 and 2004 she was appointed judge at the district court of Bratislava where she would decide on civil, commercial and administrative matters. In 2004, she assumed a role as judge in administrative law in the Supreme Court of Slovakia. After she represented the Slovak Republic before the European Court of Human Rights in the years 2005 and 2006, she returned to the Supreme Court of Slovakia in 2007, becoming the president of a panel for administrative law between 2011 and 2015. In September 2015, it was reported that she was elected as the replacement of Jan Šikuta at the European Court of Human Rights. Her appointment came after three other candidates for the position were rejected, one by the Slovak parliament and the others by the Parliamentary Assembly of the Council of Europe.
