= Children-404 =

Children-404. LGBT teens. We exist!
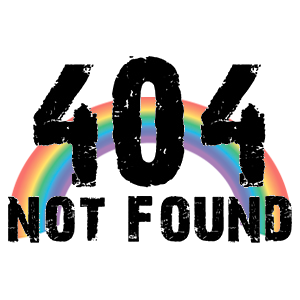
- Founded: March 4, 2013
- Founders: Lena Klimova
- Type: non-profit
- Location: Russia
- Region served: Worldwide
- Website: Deti-404

Children-404 is a Russian LGBTI online community on Facebook and on the social networking site VK. The establisher of the community is Lena Klimova, a journalist based in the city of Nizhny Tagil. She is the author of a series of articles on lesbian, gay, bisexual, transgender and intersex (LGBTI) teenagers and she published in 2014 a book on the topic. In 2013, she set up an online community on Facebook and on the social networking site VK named Children-404, which provides a space for teenagers to discuss LGBTI issues and support each other.

== Objectives ==
The Project’s Facebook and VK pages (entitled "Children-404") publish letters from Russian LGBT teenagers in which they talk about the problems they face in their lives due to homophobic people around them - friends, relatives, classmates, teachers, and others. The Project’s pages also publishes letters from adults with words of support for the Russian LGBT adolescents.

The number "404" in the project title refers to the internet error message "Error 404 - Page not found". The project authors draw attention to the fact that in Russian society not many people consider the existence of gay and transgender children and the challenges that they face in an LGBT-intolerant environment. The Project description states:

Our society believes that gay teenagers do not exist in nature, as if gay, lesbian, bisexual and transgender people arrive from Mars as adults. Meanwhile, one family in twenty has an LGBT-child in it, and those children are society’s invisible "Children-404".

== Inception ==
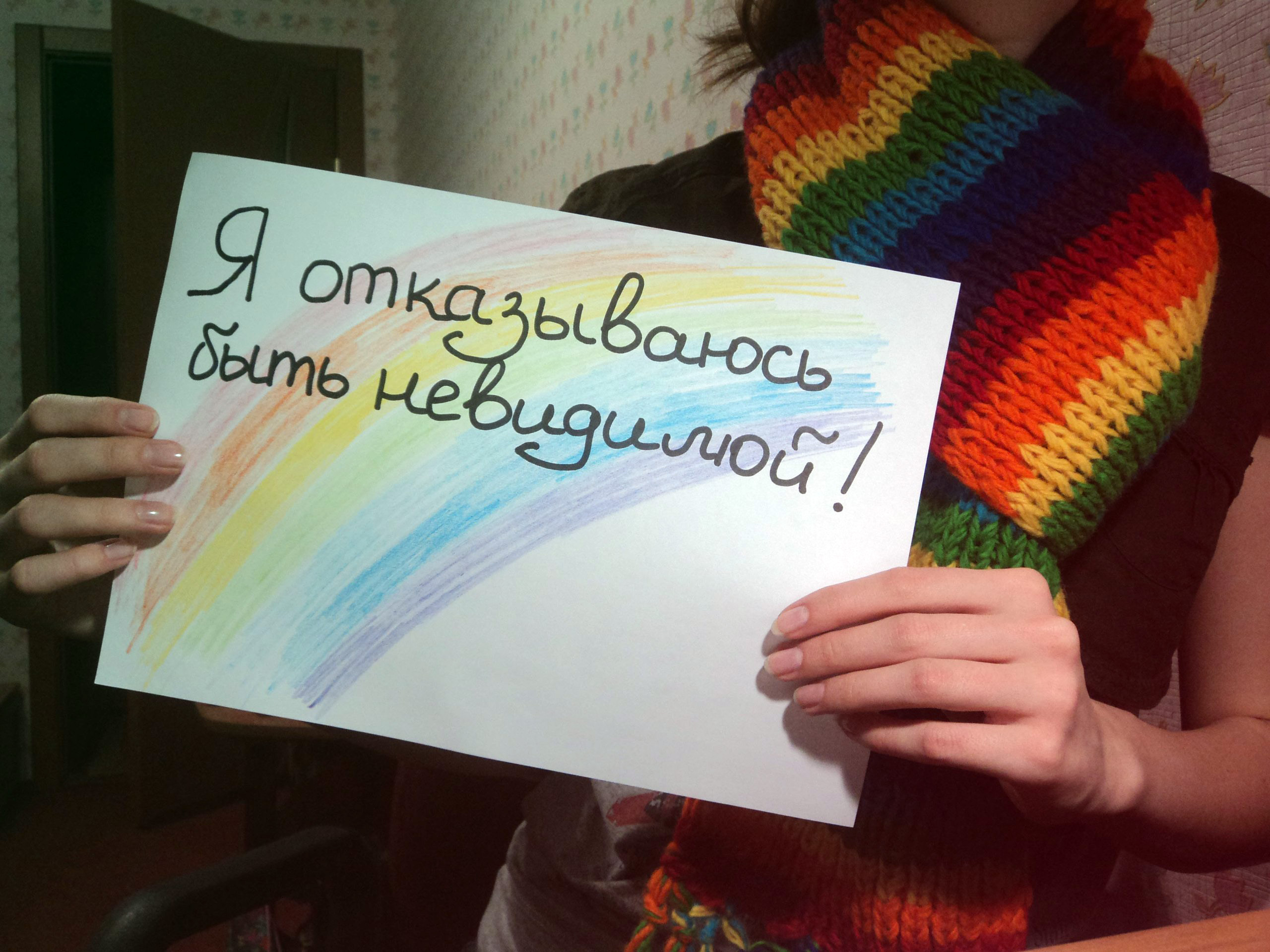
"I refuse to be invisible". Photo of one of the participants of the project "Children 404".

Lena Klimova, a young journalist from Ekaterinburg, published a series of articles critical of the parliamentary bills against "propaganda of homosexuality". Afterwards she received an e-mail from a 15-year-old girl who said that she was being bullied by her classmates and her parents because of her homosexuality. The girl wrote that had been on the verge of suicide, but Klimova’s article had made her change her mind.

After that Klimova started to research the lives of LGBT adolescents in Russia, and created an online survey. Within under two weeks Klimova had received over a hundred e-mail responses, and that is what made her resolve to create an online support project for LGBT teens.

The project consists of two parts: a private "closed" group on the Russian social network VK, whose purpose is to offer psychological assistance to LGBT teens, and in which they can share their problems and get help from adult participants; and open projects on Facebook and VK which publish letters from teens.

The popular Spanish newspaper El Mundo wrote the following about the "Children-404" Project in an article entitled "How dangerous to be homosexual in Russia", writes: "The photos show young faces whose eyes are concealed by placards with the inscription 'Children-404'. In numerous letters teens shout 'We exist!' in protest against widespread intolerance".

== History ==
The "Children-404" Project has attracted attention outside Russia. In summer and early autumn of 2013 in a number of cities in the world - New York City, Oslo, London - public rallies were held in support of the Russian LGBT adolescents and the "Children-404" Project. Some of the largest publications in the world, including The Washington Post, The New York Times, The Guardian, and El Mundo have published articles about the "Children-404" Project.

On 5 July 2013 the "Children-404" Project supported the family of Marcel Neergaard, an eleven-year-old gay boy from Tennessee, who had become well known in his home country for his success in combating homophobia. Marcel and his parents sent to "Children-404" a statement in support of LGBT teens Russia.

On 16 July 2013 six members of the Sejm of the Republic of Poland, (Anna Grodzka, Andrzej Rozenek, Robert Biedroń, Tomasz Makovski, Maciej Banaszak, and Michał Kabaciński), members of the Palikot's Movement, held a rally in support of Russian LGBT teens. They were photographed with posters saying "Children-404, you exist! We are with you!"

Polish Sejm deputies supporting the Children-404 Project

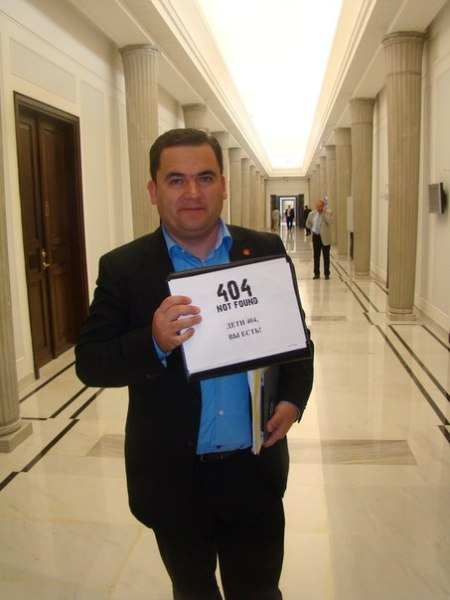

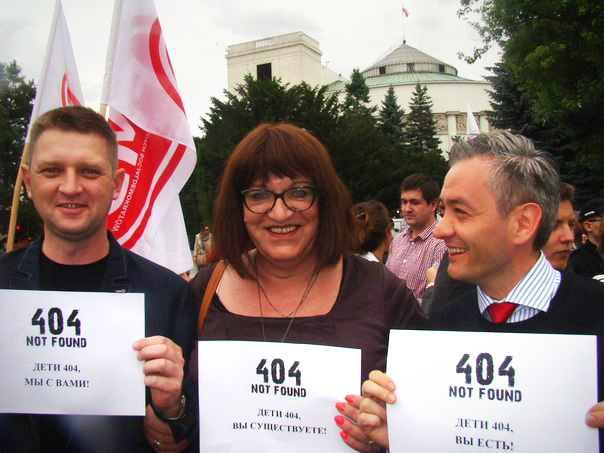

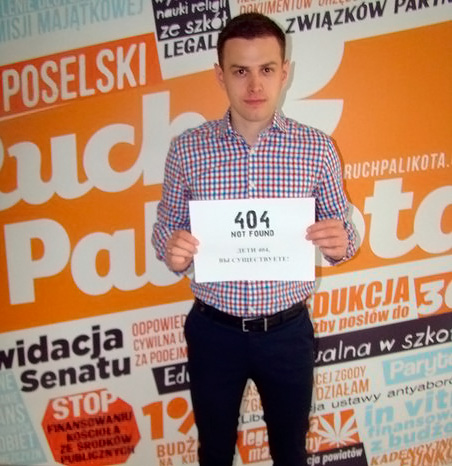

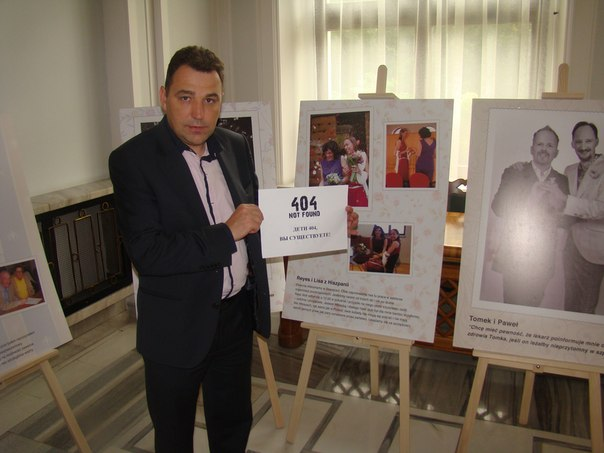

On 5 December 2013, in partnership with Children-404, the U.S. It Gets Better Project launched a campaign entitled "You are beautiful!" on its website to support Russian LGBT teens.

In January 2014, Elena Klimova was charged under a Russian federal law criminalizing the distribution of "propaganda" of "non-traditional sexual relationships" among minors. On 21 February 2014, the charges were dropped after the court ruled in consultation with a mental health professional that the page "helps teenagers exploring their sexuality to deal with difficult emotional issues and other problems that they may encounter", and did not constitute "propaganda" under the law. Vitaly Milonov, a member of the Legislative Assembly of Saint Petersburg who was in favor of the law, intended to appeal the decision.

In January 2015, Klimova was, again, charged with violating the propaganda law for operating Children-404, facing a fine of 50,000 rubles. The charges were dropped by a Nizhny Tagil court after an appeal. However, in July 2015, Klimova was charged once more and convicted by the same court for violating the law, facing the same fine. Klimova intended to appeal.

== Opinions ==
- In June 2013 Yelena Mizulina, Deputy in the Russian State Duma and author of the federal law banning "propaganda of non-traditional relationships", in an interview with Gazeta.Ru, said that the "Children-404" Project does not constitute "propaganda":

Do you know about the “Children 404” Project?

Mizulina: No, I don’t.

This is a site where children with a non-traditional orientation send their stories, talk about how they live. I beg you to look at this site before the bill is passed at second reading.

Mizulina: Such a project is not concerned with the propaganda of non-traditional relationships.

What is it like for these children when they discover that they are not like everyone else? How do they get information that it is not a disease, that it's okay?

Mizulina: Information that is explanatory, or descriptive, or which does not call for anything, which is not provocative, which doesn’t depict non-traditional sexual relations, is not propaganda, it can be legally accessed by teens.

== See also ==
- It Gets Better Project
- The Trevor Project
