= On Approving the Fundamentals of State Policy for the Preservation and Strengthening of Traditional Russian Spiritual and Moral Values =

Russian decree promoting traditional values

On Approving the Fundamentals of State Policy for the Preservation and Strengthening of Traditional Russian Spiritual and Moral Values (Russian: Об утверждении Основ государственной политики по сохранению и укреплению традиционных российских духовно-нравственных ценностей) is a Russian presidential decree signed by the Russian president, Vladimir Putin, on 9 November 2022. Its stated aim is to curb foreign influence on Russian society and promote traditional Russian values.

== Background and summary ==
Shortly before the Russian invasion of Ukraine, the Security Council of Russia commissioned D.S. Likhachev Heritage Institute to develop a "strategy for the protection of spiritual and moral values".

The decree defines traditional values as "moral guidelines that are passed down from generation to generation and form the basis of the all-Russian civic identity". It defines some of these values "life, dignity, human rights and freedoms, patriotism, citizenship, service to the Fatherland and responsibility for its fate, high moral ideals, a strong family, creative labour, the priority of the spiritual over the material, humanism, compassion, justice, collectivism, mutual assistance and respect, historical memory and continuity of generations, and the unity of the peoples of Russia". It also states that ideological influence from Western nations, particularly the United States, ia a threat to Russian cultural values and demographic stability. It aims to promote a positive image of Russia internationally. Domestically, media and government are expected to work together to uphold these ideals, with official policy on traditional values reviewed every six years. The narrative also links the perceived erosion of the traditional family structure – particularly alleged LGBTQ "propaganda" – to broader societal decline.

Once the decree was passed, theatres were required to fill in a document listing past or current films that were aligned with its list of values.

In June 2025, discussions at the St. Petersburg International Economic Forum by members of the Russian Orthodox Church proposed listing Russian traditional values in textbooks. The deputy head of the Federal Medical-Biological Agency, Nikolai Lishin, called for criminal charges against those who "[steal] ... spiritual and moral value". That month, a bill that passed its first reading in the State Duma proposed that films that discredited or denied these values would not be given permission to distribute and that the Ministry of Culture would have permission to amend or remove existing certificates in light of newer legislation.
