= Russian anti-LGBTQ law =

Law enacted in 2013

Anti-LGBTQ law in Russia
- Coat of arms of Russia

Federal Assembly
- Long title: Law for the Purpose of Protecting Children from Information Advocating a Denial of Traditional Family Values
- Signed by: President Vladimir Putin
- Signed: 30 June 2013

Legislative history
- Introduced by: Yelena Mizulina (SR)
- First reading: 11 June 2013 (State Duma)
- Voting summary: 435 voted for; 1 abstained
- Second reading: 27 June 2013 (Federation Council)
- Voting summary: 137 voted for; 1 abstained

Related legislation
- On Protecting Children from Information Harmful to Their Health and Development

Summary
- Censors information about the existence of the LGBTQ community

Keywords
- Censorship; LGBTQ rights in Russia
- Status: In force (amended)

The anti-LGBTQ law in Russia, also known as the anti-gay law in Russia, formally Law for the Purpose of Protecting Children from Information Advocating a Denial of Traditional Family Values, is a law of Russia. It was unanimously passed by the State Duma on 11 June 2013 (with only one member abstaining—Ilya Ponomarev), unanimously passed by the Federation Council on 27 June 2013, and signed into law by President Vladimir Putin on 30 June 2013.

The stated purpose of the Russian government for the law is to prevent the presentation of the LGBTQ community as a normal part of Russian society under the argument that LGBTQ rights in Russia contradict traditional Russian values. The statute amended the Russian law On Protecting Children from Information Harmful to Their Health and Development and the Code of the Russian Federation on Administrative Offenses, to prohibit the distribution of "propaganda of non-traditional sexual relationships" among minors. This definition includes materials that "raise interest in" such relationships, cause minors to "form non-traditional sexual predispositions", or "[present] distorted ideas about the equal social value of traditional and non-traditional sexual relationships." Businesses and organizations can also be forced to temporarily cease operations if convicted under the law, and foreign nationals may be arrested and detained for up to 15 days then deported, or fined up to 5,000 rubles and deported.

The support of the Russian government for the law appealed to social conservatives, religious conservatives, and Russian nationalists. The law was condemned by the Venice Commission of the Council of Europe (of which Russia was a member of at the time of the enactment of the law), by the United Nations Committee on the Rights of the Child and by human rights organizations, such as Amnesty International and Human Rights Watch. The statute was criticized for its broad and ambiguous wording (including the aforementioned "raises interest in" and "among minors"), which many critics characterized as being an effective ban on publicly promoting LGBTQ culture and LGBTQ rights. The law was also criticized for leading to an increase and justification of homophobic violence, while the implications of the laws in relation to the then-upcoming Winter Olympics being hosted by Sochi were also cause for concern, as the Olympic Charter contains language explicitly barring various forms of discrimination.

On 5 December 2022, an amendment to the law was signed into law by Putin, prohibiting the distribution of "propaganda of non-traditional relationships" among any age group. It also prohibits the distribution of materials that promote transgender identity among minors. As part of a further crackdown on LGBT rights, the Supreme Court on 30 November 2023 designated the "international LGBT Public Movement" as extremist.

== Background ==
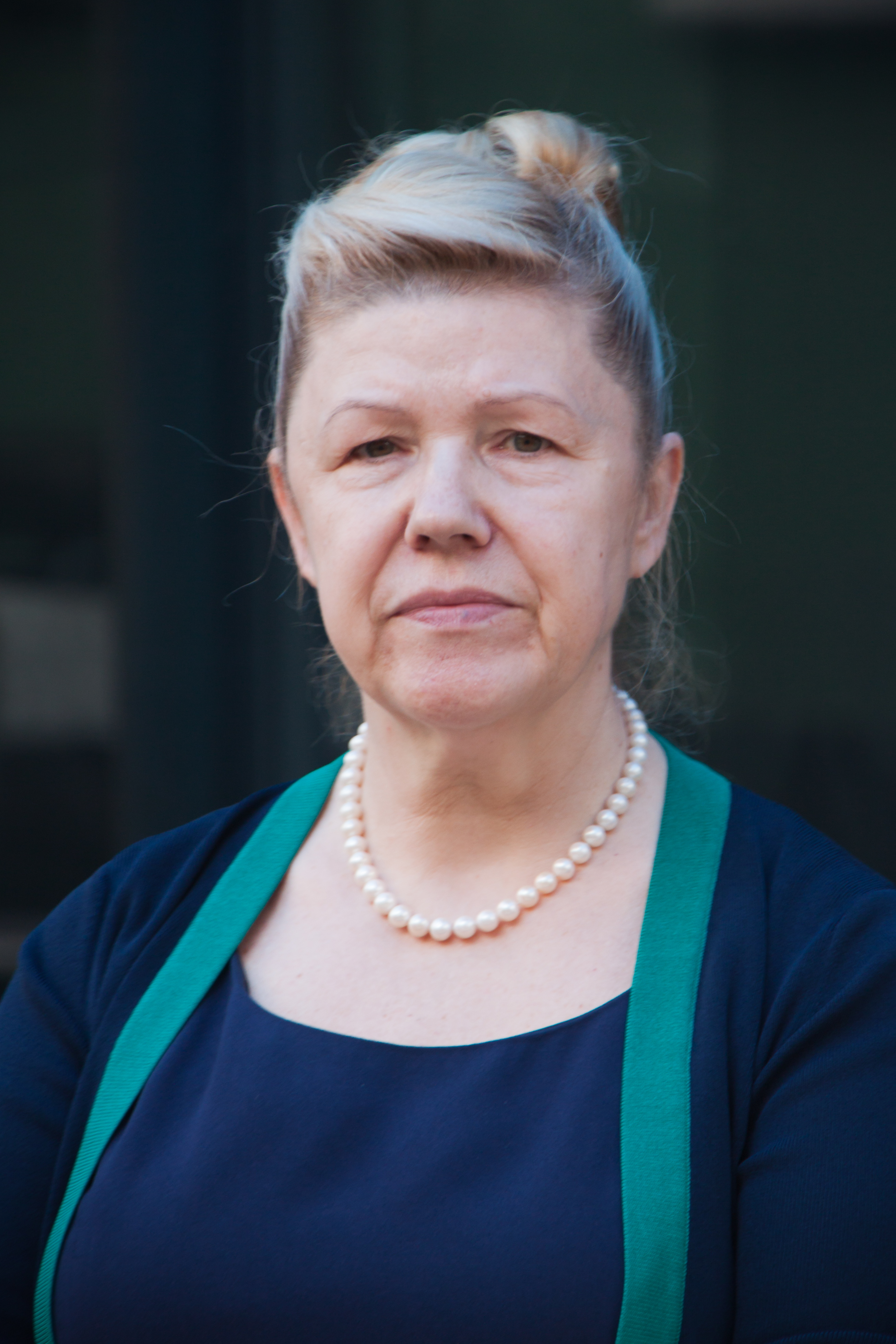
Yelena Mizulina, author of the law

Despite the fact that the cities of Moscow and Saint Petersburg have been well known for their thriving LGBTQ communities, there has been growing opposition towards gay rights among politicians since 2006. The city of Moscow has actively refused to authorize gay pride parades, and former Moscow mayor Yuri Luzhkov supported the city's refusal to authorize the first two Moscow Pride events, describing them as "satanic" and blaming Western groups for spreading "this kind of enlightenment" in the country. Social democratic Fair Russia member of parliament Alexander Chuev was also opposed to gay rights and attempted to introduce a similar "propaganda" law in 2007. In response, prominent LGBTQ rights activist and Moscow Pride founder Nikolay Alexeyev disclosed on the television talk show К барьеру! (K bar'yeru!) that Chuev had been publicly involved in same-sex relationships prior to his time in office.

In 2010, Russia was fined by the European Court of Human Rights under allegations by Alexeyev that cities were discriminating against gays by refusing to approve Pride parades. Although claiming a risk of violence, the court interpreted the decisions as being in support of groups which oppose such demonstrations. In March 2012, a Russian judge blocked the establishment of a Pride House in Sochi for the 2014 Winter Olympics, ruling that it would "undermine the security of Russian society", and that it contradicted with public morality and policies "in the area of family motherhood and childhood protection." In August 2012, Moscow upheld a ruling blocking Nikolay Alexeyev's requests for 100 years' worth of permission to hold Moscow Pride annually, citing the possibility of public disorder.

The bill "On Protecting Children from Information Harmful to Their Health and Development" introduced laws which prohibited the distribution of "harmful" material among minors. This includes content which "may elicit fear, horror, or panic in children" among minors, pornography, along with materials which glorify violence, unlawful activities, substance abuse, or self-harm. An amendment to the law passed in 2012 instituted a mandatory content rating system for material distributed through an "information and telecommunication network" (covering television and the internet), and established a blacklist for censoring websites which contain child pornography or content glorifying drug abuse and suicide.

Yelena Mizulina, who authored the law, believes that the phrase "gays are people too" should be considered potentially extremist by the Federal Service for Supervision of Consumer Rights Protection and Human Welfare.

The 2013 amendment, which added "propaganda of non-traditional sexual relationships" as a class of harmful content under the law was, according to the Government of Russia, intended to protect children from being exposed to content that portrays homosexuality as being a "behavioural norm". Emphasis was placed upon a goal to protect "traditional" family values; bill author Yelena Mizulina (the chair of the Duma's Committee on Family, Women, and Children, who has been described by some as a "moral crusader"), argued that "traditional" relations between a man and a woman required special protection under Russian law. The amendment also expanded upon similar laws enacted by several Russian regions, including Ryazan, Arkhangelsk (who repealed its law shortly after the passing of the federal version), and Saint Petersburg. However, there is no concrete scientific evidence to suggest that media exposure influences sexual orientation.

Mark Gevisser writes that the Kremlin's backing of the law was reflective of a "dramatic tilt toward homophobia" in Russia that began in the years preceding the law's passage. Gevisser writes that the law's passage allowed the Russian government to find "common ground" with the nationalist far right, and also appeal to the many Russians who view "homosexuality as a sign of encroaching decadence in a globalized era." He writes: "Many Russians feel they can steady themselves against this cultural tsunami by laying claim to 'traditional values,' of which rejection of homosexuality is the easiest shorthand. This message plays particularly well for a government wishing to mobilize against demographic decline (childless homosexuals are evil) and cozy up to the Russian Orthodox Church (homosexuals with children are evil)." Human Rights Watch noted that Putin's enactment of the law allowed him to pander to socially conservative voters at home and "position Russia as a champion of so-called 'traditional values'" on the global stage.

== Contents ==
Article 1 of the bill amended On Protecting Children from Information Harmful to Their Health and Development with a provision classifying "propaganda of non-traditional sexual relationships" as a class of materials that must not be distributed among minors. The term is defined as materials that are "[aimed] at causing minors to form non-traditional sexual predispositions, notions of attractiveness of non-traditional sexual relationships, distorted ideas about the equal social value of traditional and non-traditional sexual relationships, or imposing information about non-traditional sexual relationships which raises interest in such relationships insofar as these acts do not amount to a criminal offence."

Article 2 makes similar amendments to "On basic guarantees for the rights of the child in the Russian Federation", commanding the government to protect children from such material.

Article 3 of the bill amended the Code of the Russian Federation on Administrative Offenses with Article 6.21, which prescribes penalties for violations of the propaganda ban: Russian citizens found guilty can receive fines of up to 5,000 rubles, and public officials can receive fines of up to 50,000 rubles. Organizations or businesses can be fined up to 1 million rubles and be forced to cease operations for up to 90 days. Foreigners may be arrested and detained for up to 15 days then deported, or fined up to 5,000 rubles and deported. The fines for individuals are much higher if the offense was committed using mass media or internet.

== Reaction ==
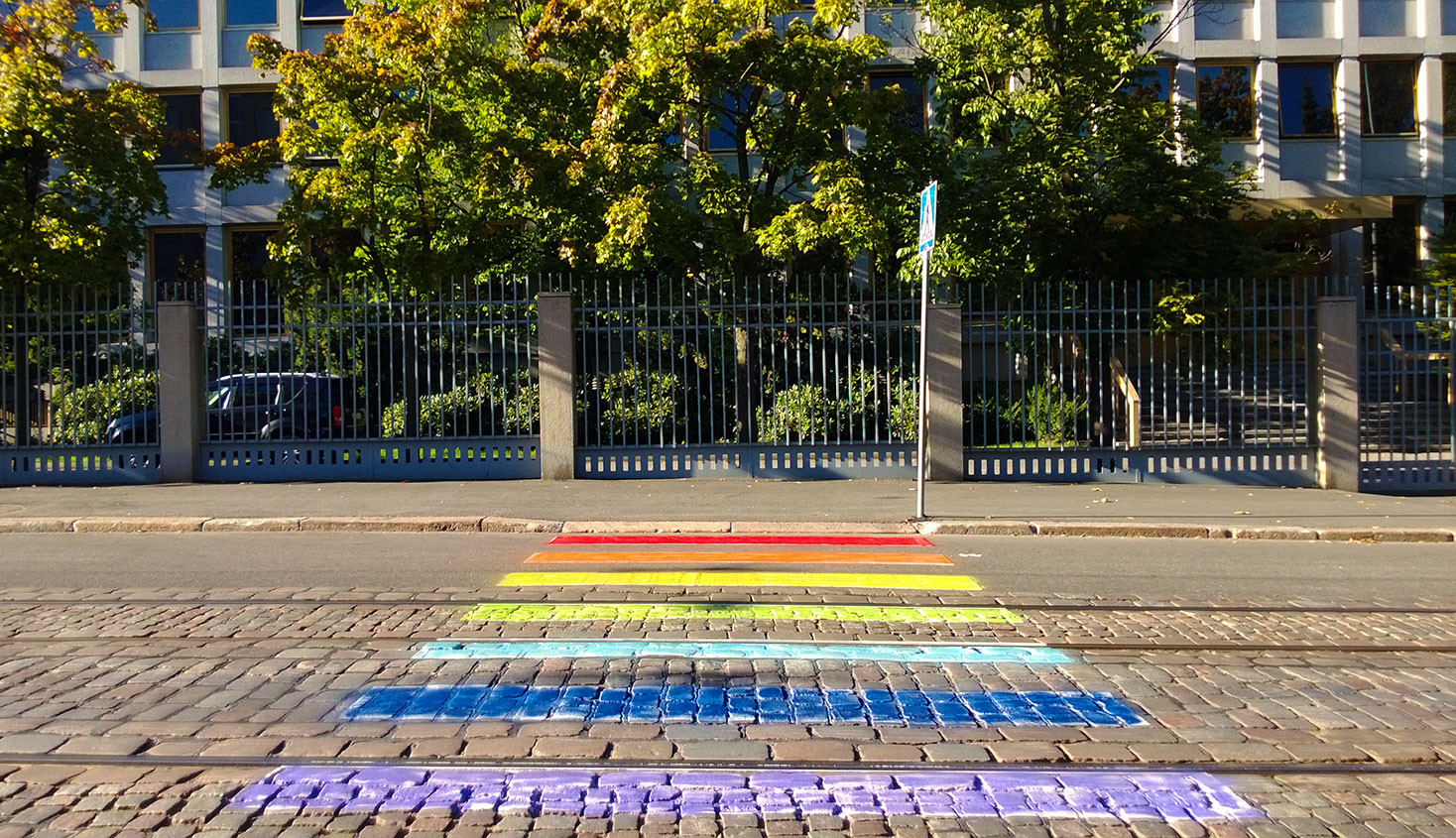
Activists painted the pedestrian pavement in front of the Russian Embassy in Finland with rainbow colors to protest against Russia’s anti-LGBTQ sentiment and legislation.

According to a survey conducted in June 2013 by the state-owned All-Russian Center for the Study of Public Opinion (also known as VTsIOM), at least 90 percent of Russians surveyed were in favour of the law. Over 100 conservative groups worldwide signed a petition in support for the law, with Larry Jacobs, manager of the World Congress of Families, supporting its aim to "prohibit advocacy aimed at involving minors in a lifestyle that would imperil their physical and moral health." President of Russia Vladimir Putin answered to early objections to the then-proposed bill in April 2013 by stating that "I want everyone to understand that in Russia there are no infringements on sexual minorities' rights. They're people, just like everyone else, and they enjoy full rights and freedoms". He went on to say that he fully intended to sign the bill because the Russian people demanded it. As he put it, "Can you imagine an organization promoting pedophilia in Russia? I think people in many Russian regions would have started to take up arms.... The same is true for sexual minorities: I can hardly imagine same-sex marriages being allowed in Chechnya. Can you imagine it? It would have resulted in human casualties." Putin also mentioned that he was concerned about Russia's low birth rate, as same-sex relationships do not produce children. In August 2013, Russian Sports Minister Vitaly Mutko also defended the law, equating it to protecting children from content that glorifies alcohol abuse or drug addiction. He also argued that the controversy over the law and its effects was "invented" by the Western media.

=== Criticism ===
The passing of the law was met with major international backlash, especially from the Western world, as critics considered it an attempt to effectively ban the promotion of LGBTQ rights and culture in the country. Article 19 disputed the claimed intent of the law, and felt that many of the terms used within were too ambiguous, such as the aforementioned "non-traditional sexual relationships", and "raises interest in". The organization argued that it "feasibly could apply to any information regarding sexual orientation or gender identity that does not fit with what the State considers as in-line with 'tradition'." The term "among minors" was also criticized as being ambiguous, since it is unclear whether it refers to being in the presence of minors, or any place where minors could be present. They argued that "predicting the presence of children in any space, on-line or off-line, is quite impossible and is a variable that the proponent of any expression will rarely be in absolute control of."

The law was condemned by human rights groups such as Amnesty International and Human Rights Watch. UN Secretary-General Ban Ki-moon indirectly criticized the law. LGBTQ rights activists, human rights activists, and other critics stated that the broad and vague wording of the law, which was characterized as a ban on gay propaganda by the media, made it a crime to publicly make statements or distribute materials in support of LGBTQ rights, hold pride parades or similar demonstrations, state that gay relationships are equal to heterosexual relationships, or according to Human Rights Campaign (HRC) president Chad Griffin, even display LGBTQ symbols such as the rainbow flag or kiss a same-sex partner in public. The first arrest made under the law involved a person who publicly protested with a sign containing a pro-LGBTQ message.

The legislation reportedly led to an increase in violence against LGBTQ people in Russia. Russian LGBT Network chairman Igor Kochetkov argued that the law "[has] essentially legalised violence against LGBT people, because these groups of hooligans justify their actions with these laws," supported by their belief that gays and lesbians are "not valued as a social group" by the federal government. Reports surfaced of activity by groups such as 'Occupy Paedophilia' and 'Parents of Russia', who lured alleged "paedophiles" into "dates" where they were tortured and humiliated. In August 2013, it was reported that a gay teenager was kidnapped, tortured, and killed by a group of Russian Neo-Nazis. Violence also increased during pro-gay demonstrations; on 29 July 2013, a gay pride demonstration at Saint Petersburg's Field of Mars resulted in a violent clash between activists, protesters, and police.

Laws restricting freedom of expression and association. Same-sex intercourse illegal: Death penalty Death penalty on books but not applied Up to life in prison Imprisonment Prison on books but not enforced

In January 2014, a letter, co-written by chemist Sir Harry Kroto and actor Sir Ian McKellen and co-signed by 27 Nobel laureates from the fields of science and the arts, was sent to Vladimir Putin urging him to repeal the propaganda law as it "inhibits the freedom of local and foreign LGBT communities." In February 2014, the activist group Queer Nation announced a planned protest in New York City outside the Russian consulate on 6 February 2014, timed to coincide with the opening ceremonies of the 2014 Winter Olympics. The same day, gay rights group All Out similarly coordinated worldwide protests in London, New York City, Paris, and Rio de Janeiro. On 8 February 2014, a flash mob was held in Cambridge, England, featuring same-sex couples embracing and hugging, as part of a video project known as "From Russia With Love".

The TV documentary Stephen Fry: Out There explored gay rights and homophobia in numerous countries in the world, including Russia. In it, Stephen Fry interviews a lesbian couple who discuss their fears that simply being out to their 16-year-old daughter and her friends could be taken as breaking this law, due to the law's prohibition "on anyone disseminating information about homosexuality to under 18s". The LGBTQ news magazine The Advocate described the law as criminalising "any positive discussion of LGBT people, identities, or issues in forums that might be accessible to minors. In practice, the law has given police broad license to interpret almost any mention of being LGBT—whether uttered, printed, or signified by waving a rainbow flag—as just cause to arrest LGBT people." The US State Department in its 2013 report on human rights in Russia noted the clarification from Roskomnadzor (the Russian Federal Service for Supervision in the Sphere of Telecom, Information Technologies and Mass Communications) that the "gay propaganda" prohibited under the law includes materials which "directly or indirectly approve of people who are in nontraditional sexual relationships." One couple interviewed by Fry said: "Of course we are afraid because we really don't know what's going to happen next in the country. ... You just don't know if they can incarcerate you tomorrow for something or not." Fry also interviewed politician Vitaly Milonov, the original proponent of the law, whose attempts to defend it have been strongly criticized; Milonov responded branding Fry as "sick" for making a suicide attempt while filming the documentary in an interview in which he also compared homosexuality with bestiality.

=== Incompatibility with the European Convention of Human Rights ===
There is a general consensus that the law violates the European Convention of Human Rights, which Russia ratified. In the 2017 case Bayev and Others v. Russia brought by three Russian LGBTQ activists following their convictions under local anti-propaganda laws, the European Court of Human Rights ruled that the laws in question violated the applicants' freedom of speech and right not to be discriminated against in the exercise of Convention rights. The court found that "the authorities reinforce[d] stigma and prejudice and encourage[d] homophobia, which is incompatible with the notions of equality, pluralism and tolerance in a democratic society".

The Council of Europe's advisory body on constitutional law, the Venice Commission, passed a resolution in 2013 stating that bans on "propaganda of homosexuality" "are incompatible with ECHR and international human rights standards" for several reasons. First, these bans were worded too vaguely to satisfy the requirement in Article 10 ECHR that limits on freedom of expression must be "prescribed by law". Second, "homosexuality as a variation of sexual orientation, is protected under the ECHR and as such, cannot be deemed contrary to morals by public authorities, in the sense of Article 10 § 2 of The ECHR". Third, the laws only target "propaganda of homosexuality" but not "propaganda of heterosexuality", which amounts to discrimination on the basis of sexual orientation under Article 14 ECHR.

=== Effects on the level of hate crime against LGBTQ ===
Hate crimes became more prevalent as a direct consequence of the "gay propaganda law". Across the country, numerous individuals, sometimes with implicit support from authorities, engaged in acts of violence against LGBTQ individuals. Some of those individuals organized hate groups that viewed the elimination of LGBTQ individuals as a means of restoring societal order.

The Russian government does not officially record hate crimes against the LGBTQ community, perpetuating a narrative that such individuals do not exist. Instead, authorities make statements such as "We don't have those kinds of people here. We don't have any gays. You cannot kill those who do not exist".

Overall, the number of crimes perpetrated on an annual basis since the enactment of the "gay propaganda" law has been three times higher than prior to the law. This has been reported by a number of research projects and NGOs (two Russian NGOs—LGBT Initiative Group Stimul and SOVA Center and two international organization—OSCE Office for Democratic Institutions and Human Rights – ODIHR). In addition to this quantitative change, crimes against LGBTQ people have changed qualitatively: since the 2013 law, not only have they have become more violent, more often premeditated and more often committed by a group of perpetrators.

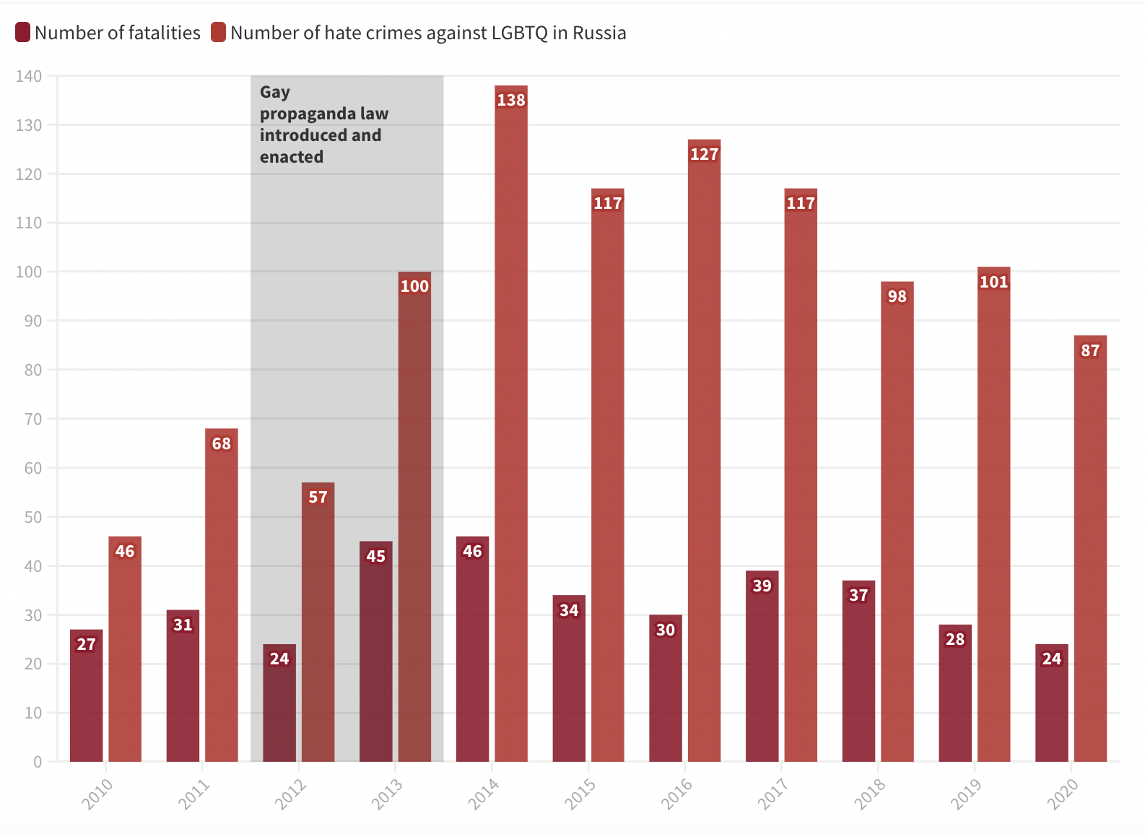
Number of hate crimes against LGBTQ individuals in Russia (2010–2020)

==== Surge in hate crimes ====
Between 2013 and 2018 there was an increase in the number of hate crimes against LGBTQ people. Such crimes existed before 2013, but the level of violence increased significantly after the introduction of the discriminatory legislation. The increase was recorded in the following year, and it remained on a higher level throughout the decade. It was reported that between 2010 and 2020 there were 1056 hate crimes committed against 853 individuals, with 365 fatalities. The number of crimes after the "gay propaganda" law was enacted is three times higher than before (46 in 2010 compared to 138 in 2015).

These incidents include violent attacks, murders, threats, destruction of property, robberies and others.

After 2013 the crimes against gay people became more violent—research shows that 67% of hate crime incidents have indications of "extreme violence".

Additionally, the crimes became more elaborate, there were more premeditated crimes, committed with preparation (oftentimes by a group of perpetrators with a purposeful selection of a homosexual target)—for three years in a row (2017, 2018, 2019) there was an increase in organized hate crimes against LGBTQ people, attributed to the activity of homophobic hate groups. In most of the cases those hate groups used dating apps and websites in order to "hunt" homosexuals. Those attacks would oftentimes include physical abuse and harassment, the videos of attacks are disseminated on the Internet.

One of the most prevalent hate group—Occupy Pedophilia became very active in the aftermath of "the gay propaganda law". Launched by Maxim Martsinkevich, a.k.a. Tesak, at the peak of its activity it was present in 40 regions of Russia. The ideology of this hate group was described in Tesak's book Restruct (2012), where he specifically addresses homosexuality, stating that it "cannot be cured" and therefore needs to be exterminated:

Restrukt [Tesak's follower] is heterosexual. In all his actions, he relies on the laws of nature, therefore he does not allow any tolerance for homosexuals. He hates them, like all other vices. However, this one, unlike some of the others, cannot be cured. There might be former smokers and former alcoholics, but there cannot be former faggots

Between 2010 and 2020 the research identified 205 cases of hate crimes committed by various homophobic hate groups. Moreover, the introduction of the "gay propaganda law" had a noticeable effect on this—the number of cases grew from 2 in 2010 to 38 in 2014. Many of those crimes are committed by Tesak, his followers or copycat movements.

=== Protests ===
A number of protests were held against the law, both locally and internationally. Activists demonstrated outside New York City's Lincoln Center at the opening night of the Metropolitan Opera on 23 September 2013, which was set to feature Tchaikovsky's opera Eugene Onegin. The protests targeted Tchaikovsky's own homosexuality, and the involvement of two Russians in the production; soprano Anna Netrebko and conductor Valery Gergiev, as they were identified as vocal supporters of Putin's government.

On 12 October 2013, the day following National Coming Out Day, a protest organized by at least 15 activists was held in Saint Petersburg. The protest site was occupied by a large number of demonstrators, some of whom were dressed as Russian Orthodox priests and Cossacks. In total, 67 protestors were arrested for creating a public disturbance.

Activists also called for a boycott of Stolichnaya vodka, who had prominently branded itself as a Russian vodka (going as far as to dub itself "[the] Mother of All Vodkas from The Motherland of Vodka" in an ad campaign). However, its Luxembourg-based parent company, Soiuzplodoimport, responded to the boycott effort, noting that the company was not technically Russian, did not support the government's opinion on homosexuality, and described itself as a "fervent supporter and friend" of LGBTQ people.

=== Proposed similar laws in Kyrgyzstan ===
In 2014, a bill modeled after the Russian anti-gay law was proposed in the parliament of Kyrgyzstan; the measure, which "drew a welter of criticism from multiple rights groups, governments, the United Nations Human Rights Council and the European parliament," would provide for even harsher penalties than the Russian law. The bill passed its first two readings by wide margins (79–7 and then 90–2) but faltered after two of the legislation's lead sponsors failed to win re-election. In 2016, the legislation was again raised in parliament, but was held up in subcommittee.

=== Proposed similar laws in The U.S. ===
In 2025, "House Bill 4938" proposed in the U.S. state of Michigan could likewise enshrine potentially harsher penalties than the Russian law. The bill aims to criticize "depiction, description, or simulation, whether real, animated, digitally generated, written, or auditory, of sexual acts." Distribution would entail up to 20 years in a state prison, in addition to a $100,000 fine. One of the specifically listed auditory bans would be of "erotic autonomous sensory meridian response", a.k.a. "A.S.M.R." content.

=== Prosecutions and other effects ===
The first arrest made under the propaganda law occurred just hours after it was passed: 24-year-old activist Dmitry Isakov was arrested in Kazan for publicly holding a sign reading "Freedom to the Gays and Lesbians of Russia. Down With Fascists and Homophobes", and ultimately fined 4,000 rubles (US$115). Isakov had performed a similar protest in the same location the previous day as a "test" run, but was later caught in an altercation with police officers who targeted his pro-gay activism, and arrested him for swearing. He would be released without charge, but pledged to return there the next day to show that he would "not be cowed by such pressure." Isakov also claimed that he had been fired from his job at a bank as a result of the conviction.

In December 2013, Nikolay Alexeyev and Yaroslav Yevtushenko were fined 4,000 rubles for picketing outside a children's library in Arkhangelsk with banners reading, "Gays aren't made, they're born!" Their appeal was denied.

In January 2014, Alexander Suturin, editor-in-chief of the Khabarovsk newspaper Molodoi Dalnevostochnik, was fined 50,000 rubles (US$1,400) for publishing a news story discussing the teacher Alexander Yermoshkin, who had been fired for self-admittedly holding "rainbow flash mobs" in Khabarovsk with his students, and was subsequently attacked by right-wing extremists because of his sexuality. The fine centred around a quote in the article by the teacher, who stated that his very existence was "effective proof that homosexuality is normal."

Elena Klimova has been charged under the law multiple times for operating Children-404—an online support group for LGBTQ youth on the social networking services VKontakte and Facebook. The first of these charges was overturned in February 2014, after a court ruled in consultation with a mental health professional that the group "helps teenagers exploring their sexuality to deal with difficult emotional issues and other problems that they may encounter", and that these activities did not constitute "propaganda of non-traditional sexual relationships" as defined under the law. In January 2015, Klimova was sent to court for the same charges. They were overturned on appeal, only for the same court to convict Kilmova and issue a fine of 50,000 rubles in July 2015, pending an appeal.

In November 2014, one day after current Apple Inc. CEO Tim Cook publicly announced that he was proud of being gay, it was reported that an iPhone-shaped memorial honoring its late co-founder Steve Jobs had been removed from a Saint Petersburg university campus by its installer, the West European Financial Union (ZEFS). It was alleged that the memorial was removed due to the law because it was in an area frequented by minors. In September 2015, Apple became the subject of an investigation by officials in Kirov for implementing emoji on its operating systems which depict same-sex relationships, over whether they may constitute a promotion of non-traditional sexual relationships to minors. Roskomnadzor later ruled that by themselves, emoji depicting same-sex couples did not constitute a violation of the propaganda law, as whether they have a positive or negative connotation depends on their actual context and usage.

In March 2018, Roskomnadzor ordered the prominent website Gay.ru to be blocked in the country due to the law.

=== Effects on sports ===
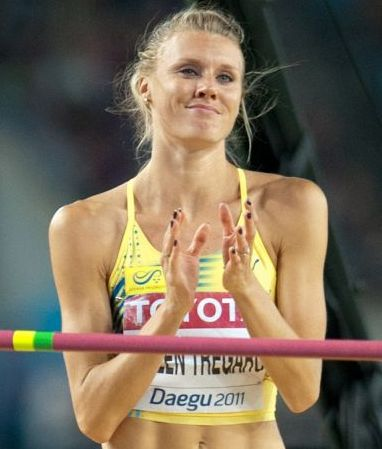
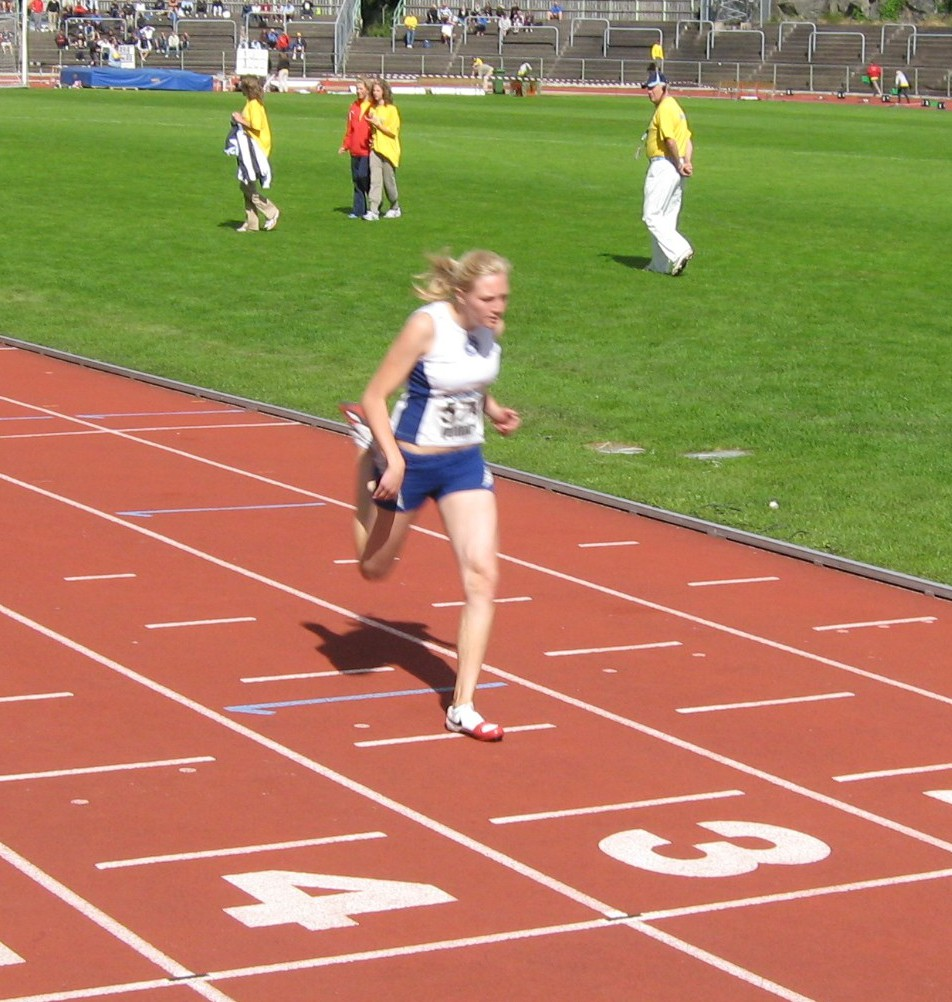
Emma Green Tregaro (pictured in 2011) and Moa Hjelmer (pictured in 2007) were among the first athletes to make prominent statements against the law.

The 2013 World Championships in Athletics, held at Moscow's Luzhniki Stadium in August 2013, were overshadowed by comments and protests over the law by athletes. After winning a silver medal at the event, U.S. runner Nick Symmonds stated that "whether you're gay, straight, black, white, we all deserve the same rights. If there's anything I can do to champion the cause and further it, I will, shy of getting arrested." Swedish athletes Emma Green Tregaro and Moa Hjelmer painted their fingernails in rainbow colors as a symbolic protest. However, Tregaro was forced to re-paint them after they were deemed a political gesture that violated the rules of the IAAF. In response, she re-painted them red as a symbol of love. Russian pole vaulter Yelena Isinbayeva criticized Tregaro's gesture as being disrespectful to the host country, stating in a press conference that "we have our law which everyone has to respect. When we go to different countries, we try to follow their rules. We are not trying to set our rules over there. We are just trying to be respectful." After Isinbayeva's remarks attracted widespread criticism, she argued that her choice of words had been "misunderstood" due to poor English.

The implications of the law on Russia's hosting of two major international sporting events, the 2014 Winter Olympics in Sochi (where seven LGBTQ athletes, all female, were expected to compete) and the 2018 FIFA World Cup, were called into question. In the case of the World Cup, FIFA had recently established an anti-discrimination task force, and was also facing criticism for awarding the 2022 World Cup to the country of Qatar, where homosexuality is illegal; in August 2013, FIFA requested information from the Russian government on the law and its potential effects on the association football tournament. In the case of the Winter Olympics, critics considered the law to be inconsistent with the Olympic Charter, which states that "[discrimination] on grounds of race, religion, politics, gender or otherwise is incompatible with belonging to the Olympic Movement." In August 2013, the International Olympic Committee "received assurances from the highest level of government in Russia that the legislation will not affect those attending or taking part in the Games", and also received word that the government would abide by the Olympic Charter. The IOC also confirmed that it would enforce Rule 50 of the Olympic Charter, which forbids political protest, against athletes who make displays of support for the LGBTQ community at the Games. Vladimir Putin also made similar assurances prior to the Games, but warned LGBTQ attendees that they would still be subject to the law.

Athletes and supporters used the Olympics as leverage for further campaigns against the propaganda law. A number of athletes came out as lesbian, gay, or bisexual to spread awareness of the situation in Russia, including Australian snowboarder Belle Brockhoff, Canadian speed skater Anastasia Bucsis, gold medal figure skater Brian Boitano, and Finnish swimmer Ari-Pekka Liukkonen. There were also calls to boycott the Games, drawing comparisons to the Summer Olympics of 1980 in Moscow, the last time the Olympics were held on what is now Russian soil. A campaign known as Principle 6 was established in collaboration between a group of Olympic athletes, the organizations All Out and Athlete Ally, and clothing maker American Apparel, selling merchandise (such as clothing) with a quotation from the Olympic Charter to support pro-LGBTQ organizations. Toronto advertising copywriter Brahm Finkelstein also began to market a rainbow-coloured matryoshka doll set known as "Pride Dolls", designed by Italian artist Danilo Santino, to benefit the Gay and Lesbian International Sport Association, organizers of the World Outgames.

Action was leveraged directly against Olympic sponsors and partners as well; in late-August 2013, the Human Rights Campaign sent letters to the ten Worldwide Olympic Partner companies, urging them to show opposition towards anti-LGBTQ laws, denounce homophobic violence, ask the IOC to obtain written commitments for the safety of LGBTQ athletes and attendees, and oppose future Olympic bids from countries that outlaw support for LGBTQ equality. In February 2014, prior to the games, a group of 40 human rights organizations (including Athlete Ally, Freedom House, Human Rights Campaign, Human Rights Watch and Russian LGBT Network among others) also sent a joint letter to the Worldwide Olympic Partners, urging them to use their prominence to support the rights of LGBTQ athletes under the Olympic Charter, and pressure the IOC to show greater scrutiny towards the human rights abuses of future host countries. On 3 February 2014, USOC sponsor AT&T issued a statement in support of LGBTQ rights at the Games, becoming the first major Olympic advertiser to condemn the laws. Several major non-sponsors also made pro-LGBTQ statements to coincide with the opening of the Games; Google placed a quotation from the Olympic Charter and an Olympic-themed logo in the colours of the rainbow flag on its home page worldwide, while Channel 4 (who serves as the official British broadcaster of the Paralympics) adopted a rainbow-coloured logo and broadcast a "celebratory", pro-LGBTQ advert entitled "Gay Mountain" on 7 February 2014, alongside an interview with former rugby union player and anti-homophobia activist Ben Cohen. As part of its Dispatches series, Channel 4 had also broadcast a documentary during the week of the Opening Ceremony entitled Hunted, which documented the violence and abuse against LGBTQ people in Russia in the wake of the law.

=== Effects on video games ===
In May 2014, it was revealed that in accordance with the propaganda law, the computer game The Sims 4—a new installment in a life simulation game franchise published by Electronic Arts which has historically allowed characters to participate in same-sex relationships, and allowed players to give their characters a customised gender, had been given an "18+" rating, restricting its sale to adults only. In contrast, the pan-European ratings board PEGI has historically rated The Sims games as being suitable for those aged 12 and over.

In December 2016, the video game FIFA 17 (which is also published by Electronic Arts) was targeted for an event that allowed users to obtain rainbow-coloured shoelaces for their virtual footballers, in support of a pro-LGBTQ advocacy campaign backed by the English Premier League. MP Irina Rodnina stated that relevant authorities needed to "verify the possibility of distributing this game on the territory of the Russian Federation".

In December 2016, Blizzard Entertainment geo-blocked a tie-in web comic for its game Overwatch in Russia for containing a scene of the character Tracer, who was confirmed as being lesbian, kissing her partner, another woman. Blizzard cited the gay propaganda law as reasoning for the block. The game itself is not blocked in the country.

In February 2021, Miitopia received an 18+ rating due to the ability of same-sex Miis being able to form "relationships" with each other despite no actual sexual content whatsoever being present in the game.

== Expansion of the propaganda law ==
In July 2022, Communist politician Nina Ostanina co-sponsored a bill that would ban "the denial of family values" and the promotion of "non-traditional sexual orientations". In an interview, she further stated that "a traditional family is a union of a man and woman, it's children, it's a multi-generational family."

In September 2022, at a political ceremony in which Russia formally annexed regions of Ukraine, Putin said: "Do we really want to have here, in our country, in Russia, 'Parent No. 1, No. 2, No. 3' instead of 'mom' and 'dad?' Do we really want perversions that lead to degradation and extinction to be imposed in our schools from the primary grades?"

On 27 October 2022, the State Duma unanimously passed a proposed bill that expands the gay propaganda law to cover any age group, instead of only minors. The bill also adds materials that give minors a "desire to change their sex", or constitute the promotion of "paedophilia", to the categories of materials covered by the law. The bill was unanimously passed by the Federation Council on 2 December 2022 and signed into law by Putin on 5 December 2022.

Deputy Secretary of the General Council of Putin's United Russia, Alexander Khinshtein, is one of the architects of anti-LGBTQ legislation that widens a prohibition of "LGBT propaganda" and restricts the "demonstration" of LGBTQ behaviour, saying, "LGBT today is an element of hybrid warfare and in this hybrid warfare we must protect our values, our society and our children."

Supporters of the bill consider it as a response to the 2022 Russian invasion of Ukraine, seeking to protect the country from supposed influence and indoctrination by liberal Western values. Konstantin Malofeev argued that "our enemy holds the propaganda of sodomy as the core of its influence". The bill has faced criticism from LGBTQ rights groups and other parties, who consider it to be a blanket ban on any pro-LGBTQ activity, and warned that it could result in the ban or censorship of advertising, films, and literature that include LGBTQ themes. It was also criticised for falsely conflating homosexuality with pedophilia.

== Enforcement trends and case law ==
In the decade following the law’s adoption in 2013, enforcement was relatively limited at first but grew steadily over time. Only a handful of cases were brought annually in the early years (for example, 2 cases in 2013, rising to around 8–11 per year by the mid-2010s), often targeting individual activists engaged in one-person protests or social media posts supporting LGBTQ rights. By the late 2010s and early 2020s, the number of prosecutions increased (reaching 17–22 cases annually), and authorities began applying the law beyond street activism. Cases were brought against a wider range of defendants – including journalists and organizations – for acts like publishing interviews with openly gay people, displaying rainbow-themed imagery, or selling LGBTQ-related merchandise.

Russian courts have interpreted the scope of “propaganda of non-traditional relationships” very broadly. In practice, almost any positive or neutral reference to LGBTQ people or relationships in a public context can be deemed illegal. For example, individuals have been prosecuted for posting images of same-sex couples on social networks, for displaying rainbow symbols, and for merely acknowledging one’s own non-heterosexual orientation in a positive light. In one 2023 case, a 27-year-old woman was fined a total of 900,000 rubles (over US$10,000) for posting online images from a music video and a film depicting same-sex romance; the court ruled that by posting the images “in open access” she was promoting non-traditional relations and creating a “distorted idea of the equal social value” of LGBTQ versus heterosexual relationships.

=== 2022 expansion and intensified enforcement ===
In late 2022, amid a broader political crackdown during that year, Russia drastically expanded the “gay propaganda” restrictions. The amended law (often referred to as the second version of the legislation) prohibited positive depictions of LGBTQ relationships for all ages, not just content accessible to minors. Following these changes, enforcement surged to unprecedented levels. In 2023, authorities initiated well over a hundred cases under the various anti-LGBTQ provisions – a sharp increase compared to previous years. Approximately 180+ cases were prosecuted in 2023 alone, dwarfing the annual totals from 2013–2022 (when fewer than 100 cases cumulatively had been recorded). In November 2023, the Supreme Court also issued a ruling declaring the "international LGBT movement" to be an extremist group, imposing further restrictions on displaying any public support for LGBTQ-related causes.

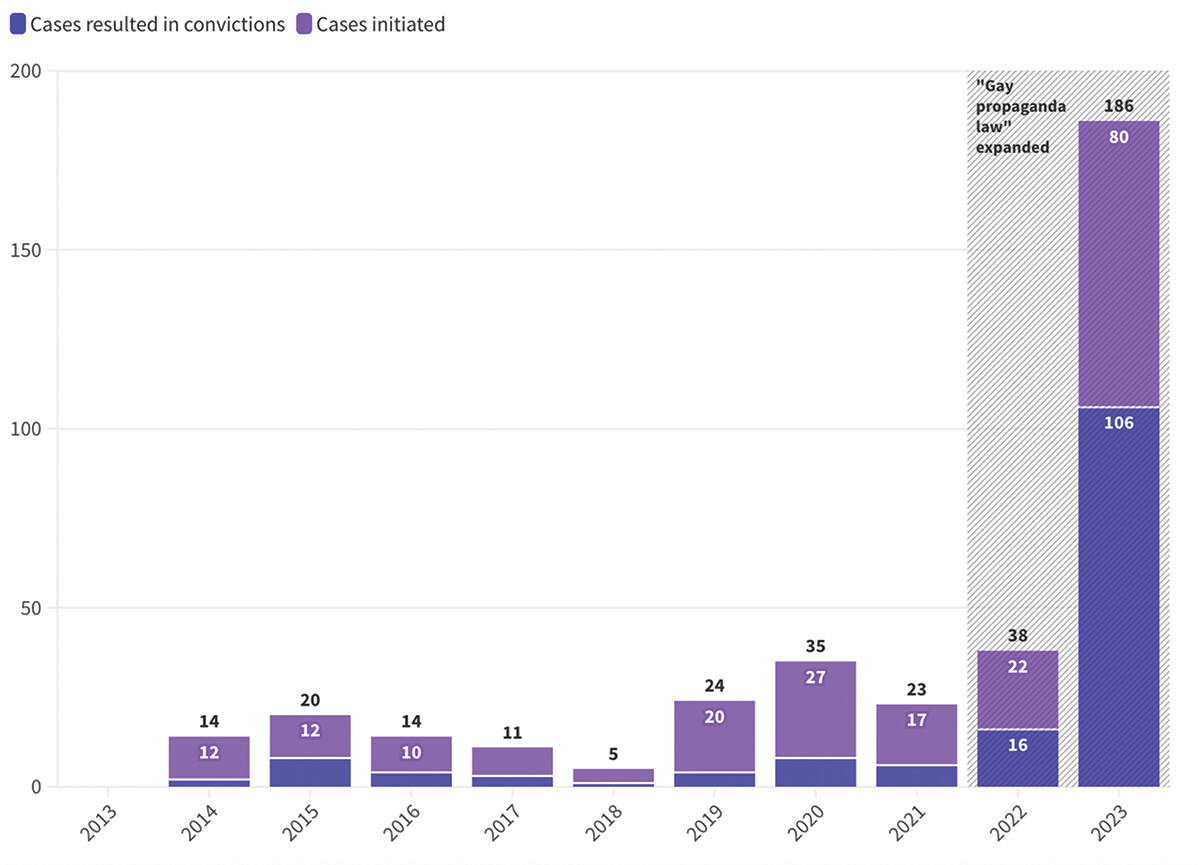
Number of "gay propaganda" cases surged after 2022 over the years.

The total sum of fines imposed in 2023 reached about 26 million rubles, far exceeding the roughly 7 million rubles in fines over the entire previous nine-year period. Many of the new prosecutions targeted content distributors and media platforms. For instance, Russian streaming services, film distributors, and even social media companies were fined for hosting movies, TV episodes or videos that include same-sex romance or transgender themes. Several major entertainment outlets – including streaming websites and television channels – received large fines (in some cases hundreds of thousands of rubles each) for “propaganda” because they had made LGBTQ-themed content available to the public. Individual activists and ordinary citizens also continued to be charged, now under the broadened rules; courts began to issue heavier fines than before, reflecting the higher penalty ranges introduced in 2022.

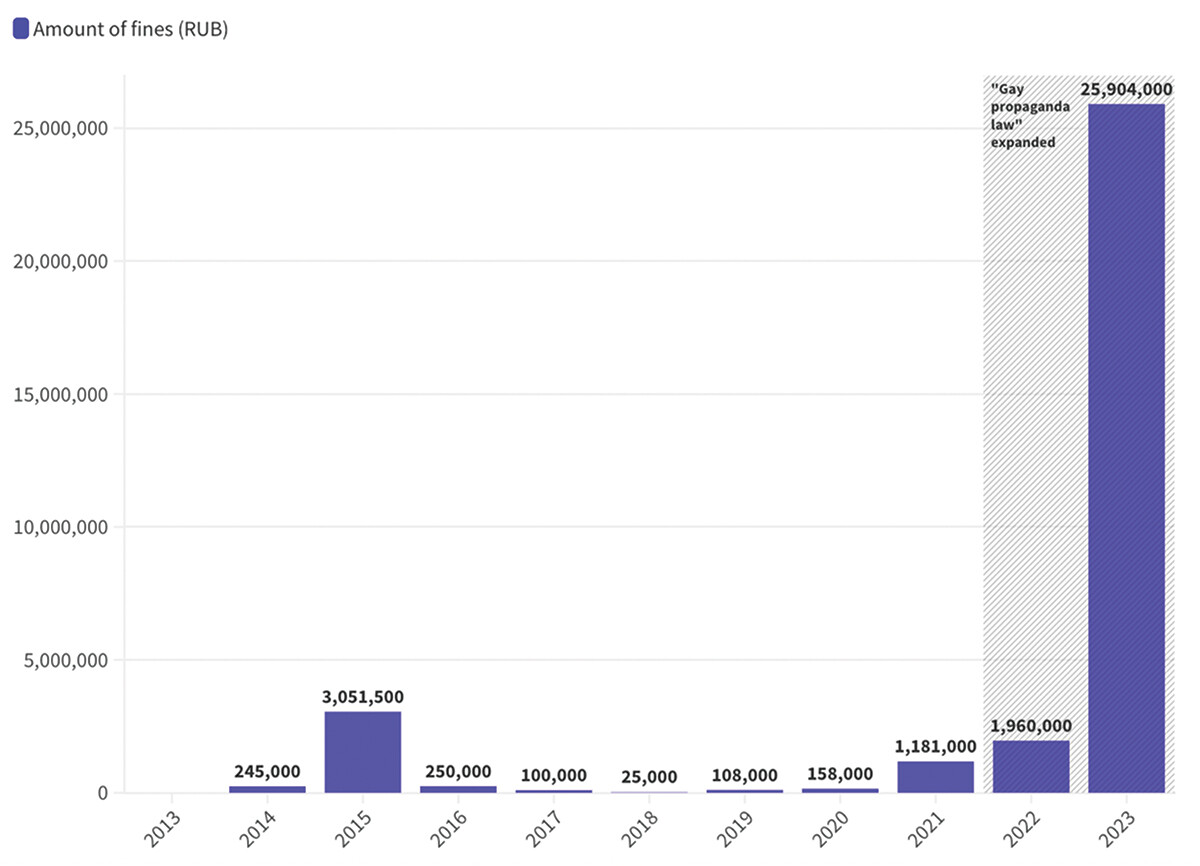
Number of fines over the years

By early 2024, the enforcement pattern of the “gay propaganda” law and related measures demonstrated a clear trend: what began as a relatively narrow ban in 2013 had evolved into a sweeping instrument used to penalize virtually any pro-LGBTQ expression, backed by steadily harsher penalties and an increasingly aggressive rhetoric equating LGBTQ visibility with societal harm. The cumulative impact of these enforcement trends has been to drive most expressions of LGBTQ identity underground and to reinforce official messaging that portrays LGBTQ themes as illegitimate or dangerous in Russia’s public sphere.

On 14 May 2025, Russian authorities arrested 10 employees of Russia's largest book publisher Eksmo for alleged "LGBTQ propaganda" in books.

In April 2026, a St. Petersburg court labelled the country's top LGBT rights organisation as extremist in a hearing held behind closed doors. Under Russia's criminal code, the designation may mean that anybody associated with the group would risk "years behind bars" for a crime that is "akin to terrorism".

== See also ==
- Bayev and Others v. Russia
- Concerns and controversies at the 2014 Winter Olympics
- List of 2018 FIFA World Cup controversies
- 2021 Hungarian anti-LGBTQ law
- 2024 Georgian anti-LGBTQ law
- 2025 Kazakh anti-LGBTQ law
- On Approving the Fundamentals of State Policy for the Preservation and Strengthening of Traditional Russian Spiritual and Moral Values – Russian decree promoting traditional values
