= Ján Šikuta =

Slovakian judge (born 1960)

Judge of the European Court of Human Rights in respect of Slovakia
- In office 1 November 2004 – 31 August 2015

Personal details
- Born: 25 October 1960 (age 65) Bratislava, Czechoslovakia

Jan Sikuta was judge at the European Court of Human Rights between 2004 and 2015. He is born 25 October 1960 in Bratislava (Slovakia).

== Education ==
He studied law at the law faculty of the Comenius University in Bratislava from 1979 to 1983. In 1984 he obtained the title of "Doctor in law".

In 1985, he passed the judicial exam of the Ministry of Justice, and was elected judge by the Slovakian Parliament.

Between 1989 and 1991 he pursued postgraduates studies in law at the law faculty of Charles University in Prague.

== Career ==
In 1986, he was appointed to the District Court in Bratislava as first instance judge until 1990. On this date, he was elected to the Court of Appeal. In 1994, he started to work as legal officer for the United Nations High Commissioner for Refugee office. During this time, his post as appeal judge was preserved.

He was a co-founder of the Slovak Association of Judges and served as its vice president from 1992 to 1994. From 1993 to 1994, he was also a member of the board of the Slovak National Centre for Human Rights.

From 2000 to 2003, he participated to Open Society Foundations's expert committee of the law program.

Between 2002 and 2004, he was a member of the Pan-European Union.

He became judge at the European Court of Human Rights on 1 November 2004. As a judge, he was cited in an NGO report for having seated in a case where the Open Society Justice Initiative was involved and other cases where other organizations linked to the Open Society Foundations were involved too. Due to his previous links with this organization, this would pose the question of a possible conflict of interest.
