= Russian Wikipedia blackout =

2012 protest on Russian Wikipedia

On July 10, 2012, the Russian Wikipedia blacked out in protest against the amendments to the law "On Protecting Children from Information Harmful to Their Health and Development" being considered in the Russian State Duma, as well as to draw public attention to the Russian Internet Restriction Bill. On the day after the blackout, the title page of Russian Wikipedia displayed an information banner calling for opposition to the adoption of this bill.

Russian Internet Restriction Bill was introduced to the State Duma on June 7, 2012, and was already passed in the first reading on July 6, despite the proposal of the Presidential Council for the Development of Civil Society and Human Rights to withdraw it from consideration. By the second reading, deputies made some amendments. On July 11, the bill was adopted by the State Duma in the second and third readings unanimously, and was approved by the Federation Council on July 18. On July 28, the relevant Federal Law of the Russian Federation N139-FZ was finally adopted and signed by President Vladimir Putin, entering into force upon publication in Rossiyskaya Gazeta on July 30, 2012.

The decision to blackout was made on the eve of the anticipated second reading of the bill. To make the decision to blackout, a discussion was held on Russian Wikipedia. The corresponding press release emphasized that "these amendments may become the basis for real censorship on the Internet...". The action was supported by several Internet resources, including the three other language sections of Wikipedia (Italian, Bashkir and Yakutian), the blog platform Live Journal, the social network VKontakte, the search engine Yandex, the wiki site Lurkmore, the imageboard 2ch.so and the Runet citation site Bash.im. Words of solidarity were also expressed by official representatives of a number of Internet companies, who expressed concern that "there was no real discussion of the bill either in the expert community or in the authorities," calling on lawmakers to postpone the adoption of the bill and to carry out its serious revision.

== Previous blackouts ==
The Russian Wikipedia blackout was preceded by the Italian Wikipedia blackout on October 4, 2011, and the English Wikipedia blackout on January 18, 2012.

Italian Wikipedia went on blackout in protest against the DDL intercettazioni bill being considered in the country's parliament. The bill would make it mandatory to correct or remove from the Internet any information deemed damaging to one's reputation, without even needing a court order or a formal order from law enforcement. During the blackout, going to any page on the Italian Wikipedia redirected to the relevant statement (Italian). The Wikimedia Foundation announced support for the Italian section on the same day. In total, the petition has been viewed more than 8 million times.

The English Wikipedia was temporarily shut down on January 18, 2012, joining the actions of opponents of the Stop Online Piracy Act (SOPA) and Protect Intellectual Property Act (PIPA) bills being debated in the U.S. Congress. The main reason for the protests was the wording of the proposed laws, which toughen measures to stop copyright infringement outside the United States. According to the protesters, some provisions of these laws were overly rigid or vague, and their application in practice could cause serious harm to Freedom of speech on the internet, the Internet community, and Websites whose content is created by visitors. In protest of SOPA and PIPA, some websites, such as the English Wikipedia, Mojang AB, and the social news site Reddit, have disabled access to their pages for periods ranging from 12 to 24 hours. Other websites, such as Google, Mozilla, and several sections of Wikipedia in other languages (including Russian), posted banners on their pages protesting the bills and urging visitors to oppose the passage of SOPA and PIPA by the U.S. Congress. A number of major IT companies, including Twitter, Facebook, EBay, and Kaspersky Lab, also spoke out against the bills. The goal of the protests was achieved: the very next day, 18 U.S. Senators out of 100, including 11 of the bill's sponsors, announced that they no longer supported the bill, making its passage by Congress virtually impossible.

== Russian Internet Restriction Bill ==
On June 7, 2012, the draft Federal Law of the Russian Federation "On Amendments to the Federal Law "On Protection of Children from Information Harmful to their Health and Development" and Certain Legislative Acts of the Russian Federation on Restricting Access to Illegal Information on the Internet" was submitted to the State Duma. This draft law envisages the introduction of provisions into federal laws implying the creation of an information system "Unified Registry of Domain Names...", which would allow to restrict access to Internet sites containing illegal information. A number of experts have expressed fears that this bill will be used to censor the Internet.

== Developments ==
On July 9, 2012, at 15:30 (UTC), two Russian Wikipedia users initiated a poll called "Strike against censorship in Runet". The organizers proposed to close access to Russian Wikipedia for 24 hours from midnight on July 10. As a sign of protest "against the introduction of censorship in Runet" it was supposed to redirect users to the press release about the blackout. The choice of date was explained by the fact that on July 10 the bill was scheduled for consideration in the second reading, although on the website of the State Duma it was dated July 11. "The strike attracted media attention already at the stage of organizing the poll, which contributed to the high activity of the participants. Almost 200 participants were in favor of the proposal, 27 suggested limiting it to a press release, and about 50 did not support the initiative at all. In the situation of time pressure, the final decision was made only by 21 o'clock (UTC), the section worked unstably for about an hour after that, and only by morning the planned demonstration of the banner with a link to the page about bill #89417-6 was finally set up. Information about the blackout spread very quickly on the Runet.

From 21:00 on July 9 to 20:00 on July 10, 2012 (UTC), a blackout against amendments to the law "On Information" continued on Russian Wikipedia. Attendance on Ukrainian Wikipedia on July 10 was a record five times higher than usual.

During the day on July 10, the executive director of Wikimedia RU, Stanislav Kozlovsky, explained the position of the Russian Wikipedia community and the Foundation to interested parties. In particular, he gave interviews about the action to journalists of Echo of Moscow in the program "Razvorot", as well as to the magazine Snob.

During the action, the media also sought clarification from other Wikipedia contributors. For example, in an interview with LifeNews, Wikipedia administrator Maxim Mozul, criticizing the bill, summarized: "I hope that parliamentarians will take into account the nuances and Wikipedia will not be affected. If it does affect us, no one will delete anything. In the situation with the closure of the encyclopedia in Iran or China, no one deleted anything. I think this is the right thing to do.

Since the discussion of the draft law took place on July 11, 2012, it was decided to extend the protest action, but in a different form. During this day, a banner containing text similar to the previous day's press release with relevant links was placed at the top of the project's title page.

On July 11, the action was supported by colleagues from other language sections of Wikipedia. As a sign of solidarity with the protest of Russian Wikipedians, banners were placed on the title pages of the Italian, Bashkir and Yakutian sections.

== Supporting the blackout ==
Since the blackout initiative was unexpected for the Internet community, and the decision was made in a hurry, colleagues did not have time to react quickly and hold synchronized coordinated actions, but tried to show solidarity with Wikipedia.

One of the first to join the protest was the imageboard 2ch.so, which, although it did not "shut down", disabled the possibility of publishing new entries and placed a line on all pages: "2ch.so vs. Russian firewall. Support free communication! Posting will be disabled for 24 hours in protest against Runet censorship" with a link to a page supporting the Wikipedia initiative.

By noon, the action met with massive support from Twitter users. The hashtags #RuWikiBlackout, #Wikipedia and even the number of the controversial bill 89417-6 topped the top of Russian Twitter trends.

At around 14:00 am, a post appeared on Habrahabr that drew attention to Russian Internet Restriction Bill and provided detailed instructions on how to write a petition to the Chairman of the State Duma, Sergey Naryshkin, requesting that the bill be withdrawn from consideration; later, it was suggested that a letter to the President be duplicated as well. The link to this note was widely circulated on the Internet. In particular, this information with a link to the "protest page" of Wikipedia was duplicated by Bash.im ("Runet Citatnik") in a text banner on the main page. Later, a link to this note also appeared from Wikipedia's press release.

On the afternoon of July 10, LiveJournal spoke out against the bill by placing a banner on its homepage, linking to a page with the text: "Amendments to the law may lead to the introduction of censorship in the Russian-language segment of the Internet, the creation of blacklists and stop-lists, and the blocking of certain sites. Unfortunately, the practice of applying the law in Russia suggests a high probability of exactly this, the worst scenario" and a link to an article about the bill on Wikipedia.

By the evening of July 10, VKontakte, the largest social network in Runet, placed a banner poster on all its pages with the text: "The Russian State Duma is hearing a law on introducing censorship on the Internet. Details on ru.wikipedia.org", the effectiveness of which led to a brief crash of the Habrahabr website, which was also linked to.

On July 11, following Wikipedia, LiveJournal and Vkontakte, Yandex "reminded deputies that freedom of speech is no less important than the fight against child pornography," calling on the State Duma to stop, and symbolically corrected the company's slogan on its homepage by crossing out the second word in the phrase "Everything can be found".

On the same day, July 11, Lurkmore supported the action by changing its logo and placing a link to the article "Censorship" on its main page.

== Critique ==
Support for the Wikipedia blackout was not absolute, and there were some criticisms.

For example, Alexander Amzin, then a columnist for Lenta.ru, compared Wikipedia editors to emergency doctors, rescue workers, and nuclear power plant personnel, saying that they "have no moral right to stop access to the resource".

The Russian Internet censorship organization Safe Internet League called Wikipedia's action "an attempt to draw attention to itself," while assuring that the amendments do not imply censorship of Runet.

== Media coverage of the action ==
The Russian Wikipedia blackout aroused media interest even at the preparation stage. In particular, Lenta.ru published a note about the blackout while it was underway, and later was one of the first to report on its start. Wikinews, a friendly news project in Russian and English, was also among the first to announce the start of the campaign.

Later the action was actively covered by Russian media, news agencies and portals, including: RIA Novosti, NTV, Radio Liberty, Interfax, Kommersant, Echo of Moscow, RBC, Rossiyskaya Gazeta, BFM. ru, Metro International, CNews, Radio France International, Rosbalt, Argumenty i Fakty, Deutsche Welle, Gazeta.Ru, Snob, NEWSru, LifeNews.

World news agencies and publications also informed their readers, among them English-language ones: Russia Today, CNET News, BBC News, The Washington Post, The Guardian, Associated Press, Reuters, CNN, Daily Mail; German: Bild (with reference to DPA); French-language ones: France 24 (with reference to France-Presse), Le Monde, Le Figaro, Ouest-France.

After the end of the action, some publications devoted review articles to its analysis.

The query "Why is Wikipedia closed?" was one of the most popular queries on the Yandex search engine in 2012.

== See also ==
- Censorship of Wikipedia
- Block of Wikipedia in Russia
- List of Wikipedia pages banned in Russia
- HTTP 451
- Internet activism
