= Yelena Mizulina =

Russian politician (born 1954)

- Елена Мизулина
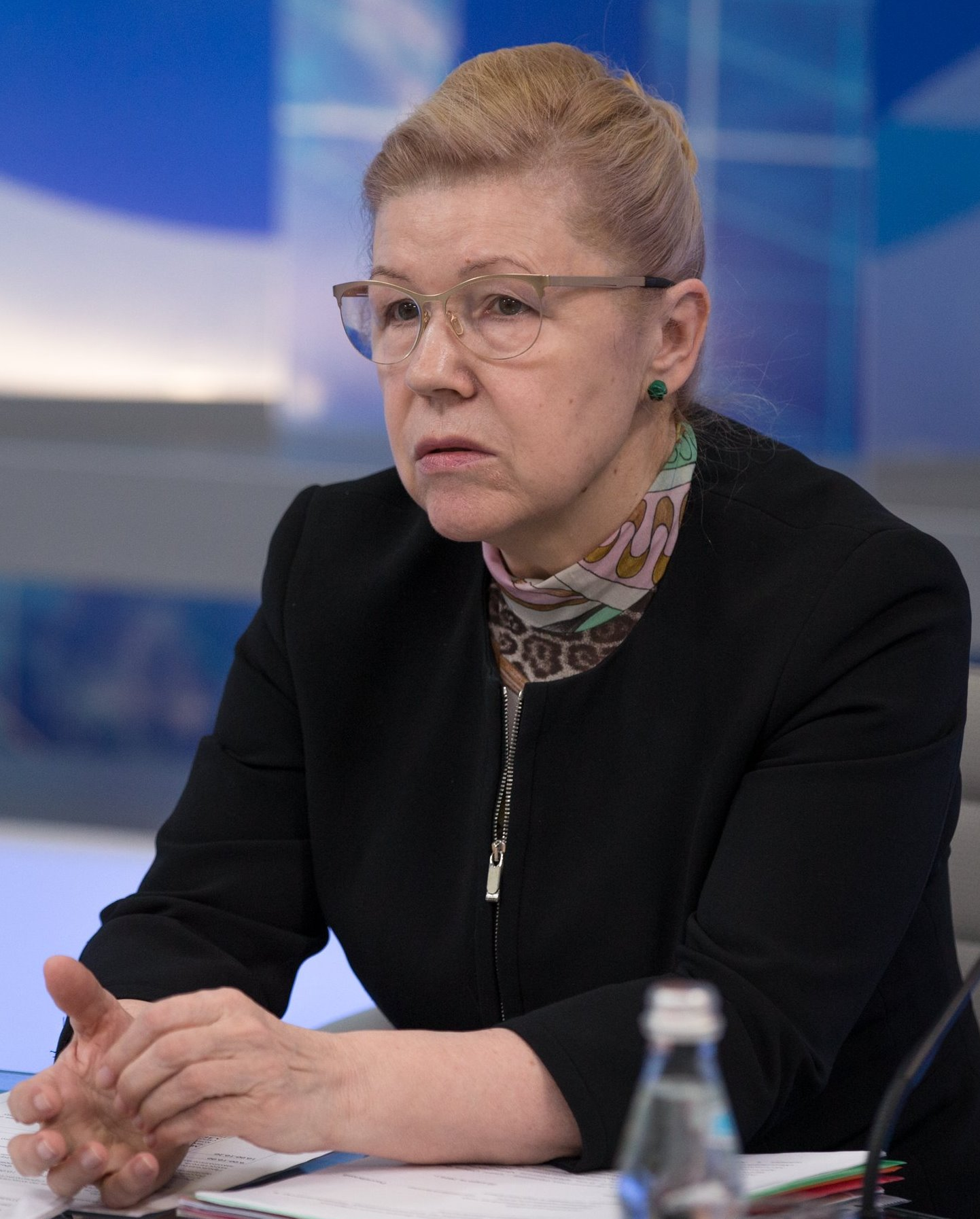
- Mizulina in 2016

Russian Federation Senator from Omsk Oblast
- In office 23 September 2015 – 16 September 2023
- Preceded by: Igor Zuga
- Succeeded by: Ivan Yevstifeyev

Personal details
- Born: December 9, 1954 (age 71) Buy, Kostroma Oblast, Russian SFSR, Soviet Union
- Spouse: Mikhail Mizulin
- Children: 2
- Education: Yaroslavl State University; Kazan State University; Russian Presidential Academy of National Economy and Public Administration
- Occupation: Politician; lawyer

Yelena Borisovna Mizulina (Russian: Елена Борисовна Мизулина; born December 9, 1954) is a Russian politician and lawyer. She served as a member of the State Duma between 1995 and 2003 and again between 2007 and 2015, and has been a member of the Federation Council since 2015.

Mizulina came to prominence in 2012 over the drafting of controversial laws concerning the rights of the LGBT community in Russia and the adoption of Russian orphan children by foreigners. She was Chair of the Duma Committee on Family, Women and Children Affairs between 2011 and 2015. She has changed her political affiliation several times, having served public office on behalf of the Communist Party of the Soviet Union, the liberal Yabloko and Union of Right Forces parties and went on to represent Omsk Oblast in the Duma as a member of the social democratic A Just Russia party.

She holds a doctoral degree in law. She has received distinctions in Russia for her work as a lawyer including the Honoured Lawyer of Russia title.

Due to Russia's annexation of Crimea she was sanctioned by Canada and the United States on March 17, 2014.

== Biography ==
=== Yaroslavl ===
Yelena Borisovna Mizulina was born on December 9, 1954, in the city of Buy in Kostroma Oblast, Soviet Union. In 1972 she began studying at the Faculty of Law and History of the Yaroslavl State University where she first met her future husband Mikhail Mizulin. They were married after their fourth year as undergraduates at university. She graduated in 1977 with a law degree and worked as a research assistant of the same university.

Between 1977 and 1984, she worked as a consultant, and then from 1984, as head consultant in the Yaroslavl regional court. In parallel she obtained a Candidate of Sciences degree via distance learning from the Kazan State University. In 1983 she successfully defended a dissertation entitled "The nature of supervisory review in the criminal process (based on the material provided by the Yaroslavl Regional Court)".

In 1985, she became Senior Research Associate to Yaroslavl State Pedagogical University named after K.D. Ushinsky. Her husband later confessed that he had taken advantage of his job as the head of the ideology in the Yaroslavl Oblast to obtain the job for Yelena. In 1987, Muzilina obtained the status of head of department of Russian history, heading the faculty until 1990. She remained a member of the Communist Party until 1991.

In 1992, she obtained a Doctor of Science in Law degree (see Education in Russia) entitled Criminal code: the concept of self-limiting country at the Institute of State and Law. In regard to this dissertation Yelena Mizulina has publicly declared the following: "It seemed that what I wrote was unique, and that I was indeed a learned person of God" (Russian: казалось, что то, что я написала — уникально, что я, действительно, учёный от Бога). Between 1992 and 1995, she was a docent and subsequently a professor at Yaroslavl State University.

=== Member of Yabloko ===
In 1993, she joined the Russian legislature from the political union "The Russian Choice" and was elected to the Federal Council (upper house of parliament in the Russian Federation), where she became the Deputy Chairman of the Committee on Constitutional Legislation and Judicial and Legal Matters, a member of the Committee on Regulation of Parliamentary Procedures.

In 1995, she joined the opposition pro-democratic political party Yabloko and the group "Reformi – the new direction" (Реформы — новый курс). From 1995 and on, she was the head of the Yaroslavl regional and public organisation Ravnovsie (Равновесие The Federation Council).

In December 1995, Muzilina was elected a member of parliament Duma from the Kirov region representing the political party Yabloko. As a result, she resigned her position in the Federation Council in January 1996.

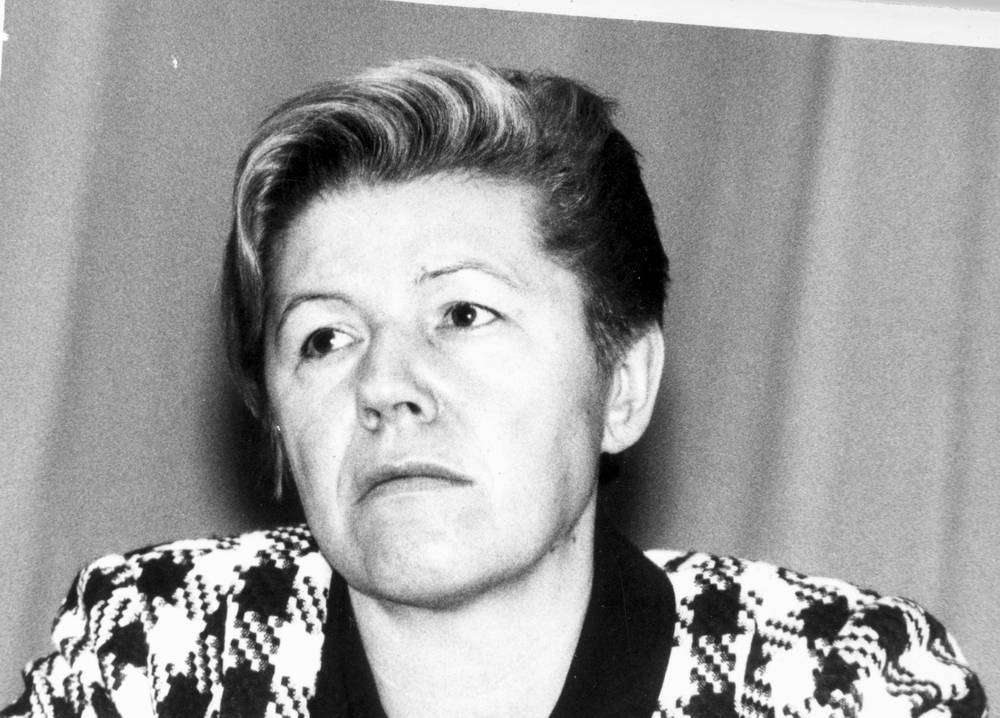
Mizulina in 1997

As a parliament member of the Duma, she held the position of the Deputy Chairman of Committee on Legislation and Judicial-legal Reforms and Deputy of the Subcommittee on Matters of State building and Constitutional Rights of Citizens. Muzilina was also involved in the legal implementation of the failed attempt to carry out the impeachment of Boris Yeltsin.

In December 1999, she was elected member of Russian parliament, the Duma, from the Yabloko party. In July 2000, she became the head of the 'Yaroslavl Union of Democratic Forces' (Ярославский союз демократических сил), which was composed of members of the Yabloko party and the Union of Right Forces.

=== Member in Union of Right Forces ===
In February 2001, she announced that she would discontinue her membership in the Yabloko party and in June of the same year she joined the Union of Right Forces party.

She explained her decision to leave Yabloko by the fact that she was "ashamed to be in a party that had obtained only 5% during elections. This had become a moral problem". Her former colleagues from Yabloko and Union of Right Forces Sergey Mitrokhin and Leonid Gozman have accused Yelena Mizulina of changing her political affiliation to keep up with political trends.

After the Union of Right Forces lost the 2003 legislative elections, Mizulina, no longer an elected parliament member, was appointed to the Constitutional Court of Russia as the representative of the Duma. In this position, she was a proponent of local governors being no longer elected but rather directly nominated by the president of the Russian Federation.

As a member of the Constitutional Court, she also worked as the Deputy Head of the Legal Department of the Duma and she graduated from the Russian Presidential Academy of National Economy and Public Administration in 2005.

=== Membership in A Just Russia ===
In 2007, she was elected to the Duma as a member of A Just Russia party. In January 2008, she became the chairman of the Duma Committee on Family, Women and Children Affairs. Originally A Just Russia put forward another candidate, Svetlana Goryacheva, for this position, which was not well accepted by the United Russia party, and Mizulina's candidature was offered as a compromise.

In 2010, Mizulina received a medal from the World Congress of Families.

In 2011, she was re-elected to the Duma as a member of the A Just Russia party. In December 2011 she became the Chairman of the Duma Committee on Family, Women and Children Affairs.

On January 23, 2017, she announced her intention to quit A Just Russia.

=== Sanctions ===
On March 17, 2014, during the annexation of Crimea by the Russian Federation, Mizulina became one of the first seven persons who were put by President Obama under executive sanctions. The sanctions freeze her assets in the US and ban her from entering the United States.

She was sanctioned by the UK government in 2014 in relation to the Russo-Ukrainian War.

== Legislative work ==
Yelena Mizulina is among the lead authors of a set of controversial legislative projects including:

- 2010 bill on On Protecting Children from Information Harmful to Their Health and Development
- 2012 Internet Restriction Bill.
- Future amendment to the bill On Protecting Children from Information Harmful to Their Health and Development that would block all websites containing swearing and the usage of mat. Opponents to the Internet Restriction Bill stressed that under the pretext of protecting children, this bill provides overwhelming tools for a broad scale Internet censorship and a limitation of freedom of speech in Russia. This protest has leading to public outcry such as the Russian-language Wikipedia strike. On June 10, 2012, she incriminated foreign intervention in these protests and therefore, she announced that she would issue an inquiry to the ministry of justice of the US. She also claimed that the Internet protests were organized by a "pedophile lobby".
- 2013 Anti-Magnitsky bill denying Americans the right to adopt Russian children. Following this proposal, US authorities have responded by proposing to include Y. Mizulina, along with Vitaly Milonov within the Magnitsky list of banned Russian personalities.
- 2017 bill to decriminalise domestic violence "first assaults which cause less serious injuries" to an administrative offence.

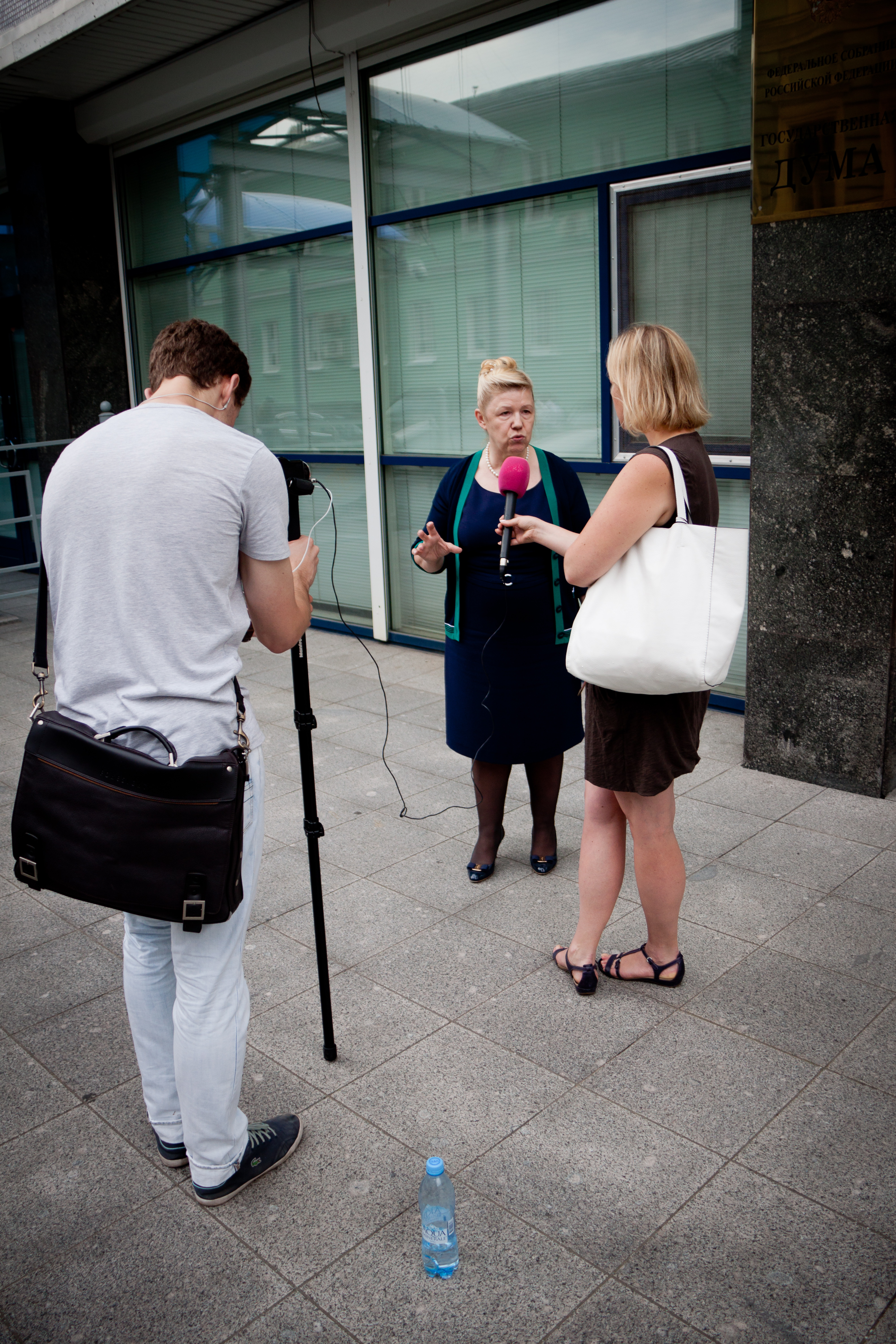
Yelena Mizulina talking to media on 11 July 2012 concerning the passing of the Internet Restriction Bill

On November 14, 2012, Yelena Muzilina declared that the 'prophylactic goals' of Internet Restriction Bill of 'acquiring a safe information space on the web without making use of punitive measures' had been accomplished. She also disclosed a possible future legislative project that would prevent access to sites previously included in the Russian Internet blacklist. Among such portals are expected to fall rublacklist.net belonging to Pirate Party of Russia.

== Views on marriage, family and sexual relations ==
Yelena Mizulina in recent times became concerned with birth rates, in her role as Chair of the Duma Committee on Family, Women and Children Affairs. In an interview with Vladimir Posner she has expressed the following views: "Analyzing all the circumstances, and the particularity of territorial Russia and her survival ... I came to the conclusion that if today we want to resolve the demographic crisis, we need to, excuse me, tighten the belt on certain moral values and information, so that giving birth and raising children become fully valued".

=== Position on abortion ===
Yelena Mizulina believes in limiting women's right to abortion. She has proposed to let abortions remain free of charge only for medical reasons and in cases of rape. In all other cases, she believes abortions should be billed to the abortion-seeking woman. She has also publicly spoken out against abortions being carried out in private medical institutions, and in favor of a ban on selling products that result in abortions without a prescription from a physician. She believes in obtaining the consent of the husband by all married women before carrying out an abortion, and in the case of underaged women – the consent of their parents.

In July 2013, Yelena Mizulina was part of a group of members of parliament that proposed legislation affecting the Offences Code of Russia that would result in a fine of 1 million rubles on doctors and medical institutions that carried out abortions on women without providing them a 'waiting period' to reflect on their decision to abort. It was also proposed to fine the pregnant women that did not respect this "quiet time" up to 3,000–5,000 rubles.

=== Position on family and marriage ===
Yelena Mizulina has expressed strong views concerning the adoption of Russian children by US citizens: "This is just mean, not to say despicable. Russia has never defended its interest at the expense of children". Two month later, she voted for the Anti-Magnitsky bill, a law that bans United States citizens from adopting Russian children.

In June 2012, the Duma Committee on matters of Family that Mizulina presides, rendered public a project entitled "The State Concept of Family Policy until 2025", which proposes amongst other things, several controversial elements including the following:

- introduction of a tax on divorce
- condemnation of the birth of children out of wedlock
- proposition of new restrictions on abortion
- strong condemnation of homosexuality
- proposition to strengthen the role of the church in passing legislation relative to family matters
- increase of the number of multi-generational families (families where grandparents, parents and grandchildren live together).
- recommendation to actively advocate multiple births
- determination of the minimum sum of child support, and proposition that it be implemented independently of the parent's income status.

Opposition journalists including Alexander Nikonov have speculated that the divorce of Vladimir Putin that took place two days after the publication of the legislative project was precipitated by the proposed fine on divorce.

After the publication of the "Concept", it was pointed out that some of the positions described in it had been plagiarized verbatim from a school report published in a free access on the Internet, which itself was plagiarized from a curriculum on family studies in the Tomsk Polytechnic University.

In this context, she has also called for the removal from Russian airwaves of the satirical cartoon South Park.

Yelena Mizulina believes in raising the age of consent in sexual relations in Russia from 16 to 18 years.

Contrary to the clause 30 of Citizen's health protection Law of Russia, she proposed to ban surrogate motherhood pointing out that the latter threatens not just for Russia to survive but also to the survival of entire humanity and is an analogy to the banning of nuclear weapons.

=== Position on LGBT issues ===
Yelena Mizulina is the author of several legislative projects directed against "propaganda of homosexuality" including the infamous Russian LGBT propaganda law. She believes that the phrase "gays are people too" should be considered potentially extremist by the Federal Service for Supervision of Consumer Rights Protection and Human Welfare. Yelena Mizulina is also in favor of confiscating children from gay parents, including biological parents.

In July 2013, Mizulina and Olga Batalina, her deputy in the Duma Committee, filed a complaint at the Institution of Criminal Proceedings against the LGBT rights activist Nikolay Alexeyev. According to Mizulina, Alexeyev is the "leader" of the LGBT community and has launched a campaign to discredit her, "to the detriment of Russia as a whole". Mizulina stated she wanted Alexeyev's punishment to be "in the form of compulsory work in a place where he can not proceed with propaganda, for example, driving a hearse". Representatives of the LGBT community have also appealed to the prosecutor's office with a complaint against Mizulina for inciting hatred against homosexuals and for infringing on the LGBT rights in Russia.

=== Accusation of political opponents of belonging to a "pedophile lobby" ===
Yelena Mizulina has accused several of her political opponents of belonging to a so-called "pedophile lobby" She first suggested that "in the depths of the United Russia party there was a "pedophile lobby" that was against toughening the law on sexual offenses against minors in 2011 during the evaluation of the Criminal Code of Russia.

Those opposing the law on On Protecting Children from Information Harmful to Their Health and Development were also accused by Yelena Mizulina of being part of a "pedophile lobby". In 2012, in regard to the Russian-language Wikipedia protest against the Duma's reading of the bill On Protecting Children from Information Harmful to Their Health and Development, Mizulina said:

This is a coverup. Wikipedia itself is not threatened. I too use Wikipedia. Notice, how only the Russian-language version was closed down. Therefore [I believe that ..] this is an attempt to blackmail the Russian parliament. Behind this there stands a lobby, and suspicions are high that it is "pedophile lobby".

In June 2013, the writer and former Russian Vice Prime Minister Alfred Koch published an article concerning Mizulina's son that lives in Belgium and works for the large international law firm called Mayer Brown that sponsors pro-gay associations and organizations and is among the hundreds on pro-LGBT rights organizations in Belgium, whilst his mother is waging war on homosexuality in Russia. In response to this, Mizulina accused Koch of being a member of a "pedophile lobby". The journalist Andrei Malgin wrote a piece in his blog entitled "Great: anyone that Mizulina doesn't like is a "pedophile lobby".

=== Decriminalisation of domestic violence ===
In July 2016, The Moscow Times reported that Senator Mizulina had proposed amendments to present legislation to downgrade spousal and child abuse from a criminal offense to an administrative misdemeanor offense. Mizulina publicly stated her opinion that the present laws against domestic violence, in which the convicted are subject to fines and a two-year prison sentence, are "absurd" suggesting that such a punishment is excessive for "just a slap."

On 11 January 2017, during the first reading of the law, 368 Russian lawmakers voted in favour of the law, one deputy voted against and another abstained.

== Investigation of alleged defamation of Mizulina ==
In June 2013, the Investigative Committee of the Russian Federation opened a criminal investigation concerning the alleged defamation of Mizulina by a group of people consisting of:

- journalist of Novaya Gazeta Yelena Kostyuchenko
- gay-rights activist Nikolay Alexeyev
- journalist-socialite Kseniya Sobchak
- economist, writer former Russian Vice-Prime Minister Alfred Koch

According to Yelena Mizulina bloggers disseminated false information concerning her alleged intention to ban oral sex in Russia. Ksenia Sobchak has communicated to the press that she was interrogated by an investigator on the topic of oral sex. Similarly, Alfred Koch claims that he was interrogated for three hours concerning the "gay-oral phobia of Mizulina" and his position concerning the latter.

== Criticism ==
The Russian political scientist Mark Urnov has described the laws instigated by Yelena Mizulina as "diverse, but having a single common quality – their capacity to spread intolerance. They are simply a legal expression of the intolerance and the suppression of everything that corresponds to one's personal views in regard to what is right and wrong".

The writer Dmitri Bykov believes that Yelena Mizulina is "constantly providing a legislative form for things that should remain a question of personal choice, which is far more dangerous than any gay pride parade".

In April 2019 Mizulina was widely quoted for her statement in defense of Russian Internet censorship laws, which were characterized as Orwellian by many journalists:

What are rights? They're the biggest lack of freedom. I can tell you that the more rights you have, the less free we are. A ban is when the person is free because it says "this is impossible, but with everything else — [you can] do what you want."

— Yelena Mizulina, The Moscow Times, 23 April 2019

== Personal life ==
Yelena Mizulina is married and has two adult children.

Her husband Mikhail Muzilin holds a PhD in Philosophy and is a docent at the Faculty of Political Sciences of the Russian Presidential Academy of National Economy and Public Administration. He was the head of the Yabloko party headquarters in Yaroslavl. He has also formerly served as dean of the Faculty of Social Sciences at the Yaroslavl State University.

Her son Nikolay Mizulin lives in Brussels with his wife and two children where he works as a lawyer in the firm Mayer Brown. This family connection caused a controversy when former Russian Vice Prime Minister Alfred Koch alleged that Nikolay's employer, US law firm Mayer Brown, which supports LGBT rights, might be in breach of the anti-gay laws instigated by Russian government and spearheaded by Nikolay's mother. After the publication, Alfred Koch was interrogated by Investigative Committee of the Russian Federation for three hours, based on accusations by Yelena Mizulina. Also, Mizulina was quoted as saying that Alfred Koch is a part of "pedophile lobby", trying to hinder the Russian government's campaign against sexual criminals.

Mizulina's daughter Ekaterina is the head of the Moscow Fund of Social-Legal Initiatives "The Rights Capital" (Правовая столица), a firm that acts as a financial intermediary, publishing and advertising, which was reported to belong in fact to Yelena Mizulina. She is a strong supporter of Vladimir Putin through her work with the "Safe Internet League", where she is a director of the Association of Market Participants in the Internet Industry, and the Konstantin Malofeev associated St. Basil the Great Foundation. The latter organization strongly supports Malofeev's wife Maria Lvova-Belova, who is the Presidential Commissioner for Children's Rights in Russia, and is wanted by the International Criminal Court for war crimes related to child abductions in the Russian invasion of Ukraine.

In the law proposed by Yelena Mizulina entitled "Concept of the State Family Policy until 2025." (Концепции государственной семейной политики до 2025 года), she has defined the 'ideal family' as marriage with the goal of commonly bringing up three or more children'. In this law she also proposes several generations of Russian parents, children and grandchildren should inhabit the same place. In a recent interview with the opposition radio station Echo of Moscow, Mizulina when asked why she herself had not conformed with the 'ideal family' she responded the following way: "I wanted three children, Misha [Mikhail – her husband] also wanted three. But things happen as they did. Fate has given us two".

In 1994, a polemic broke out when she requested a larger state-provided flat in the goal of exotic cat breeding.
