= Ivan Yevstifeyev =

- Иван Евстифеев
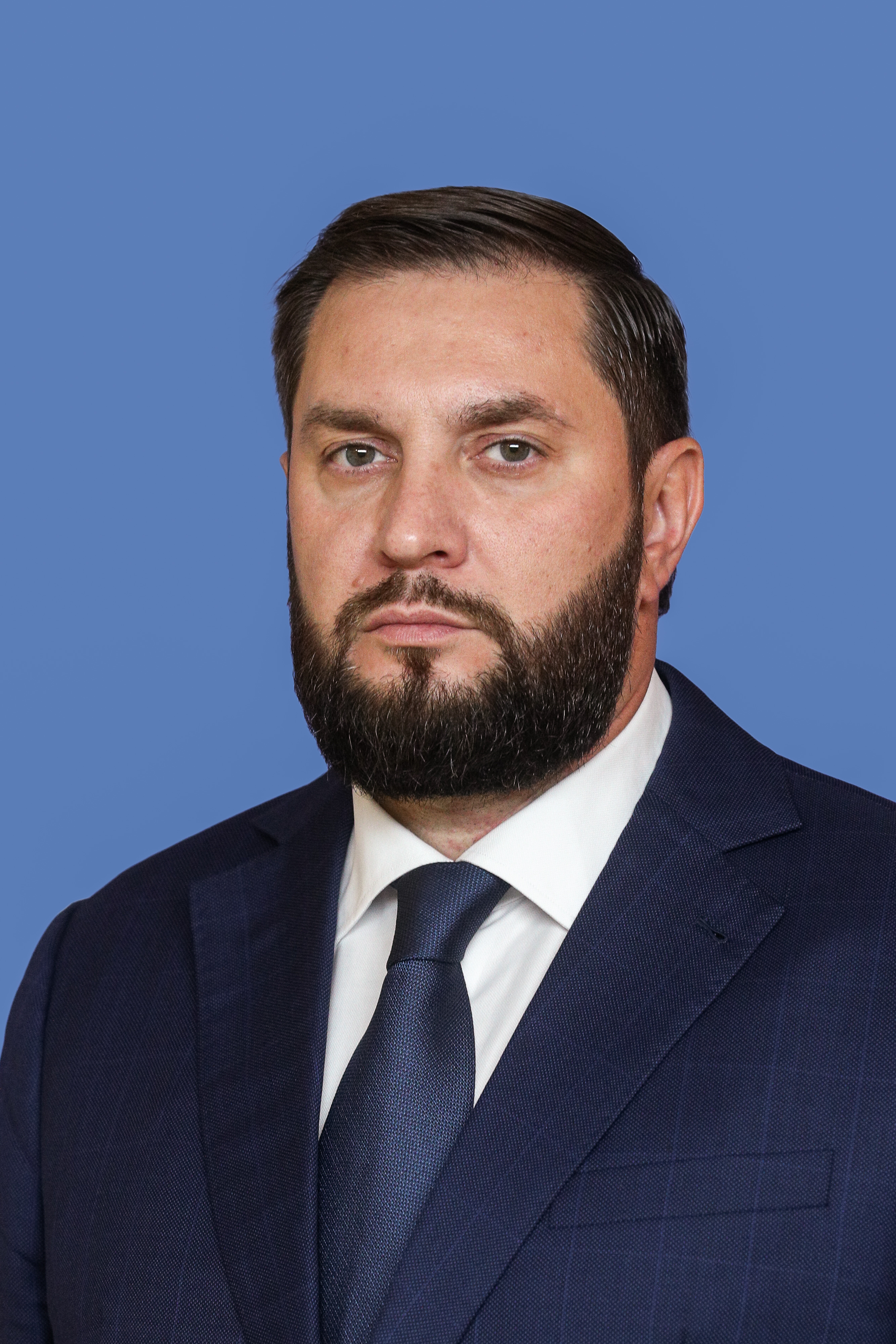

Senator from Omsk Oblast
- Incumbent
- Assumed office 22 September 2023
- Preceded by: Yelena Mizulina

Personal details
- Born: 19 December 1981 (age 44) Tara, RSFSR, Soviet Union
- Party: United Russia
- Education: Omsk State University

Ivan Aleksandrovich Yevstifeyev (Russian: Иван Александрович Евстифеев; born December 19, 1981, in Tara, Omsk Oblast, RSFSR, USSR) is a Russian politician and senator of the Russian Federation representing the Legislative Assembly of Omsk Oblast (since 2023). He is also a member of the Federation Council Committee on Economic Policy.

== Biography ==
Ivan Yevstifeyev was born in 1981 in Tara, Omsk Oblast. He graduated from Omsk State University with degrees in psychology (2004) and jurisprudence (2017). He served in the Omsk Oblast government (2004–2008), served as deputy and first deputy head of the Omsk regional executive committee of the United Russia party (2008–2012), and served as an advisor and chief advisor to the Presidential Executive Office for Domestic Policy (2012–2017). From 2017 to 2022, Yevstifeyev served as Chief Federal Inspector for the Omsk Oblast, and from 2022 to 2023, he was Deputy Head of the Administration of the Sirius Federal Territory (Krasnodar Krai).

On September 19, 2023, Governor of Omsk Oblast Vitaliy Khotsenko appointed Ivan Yevstifeyev to the Federation Council as a representative of the regional government. In this capacity, Yevstifeyev succeeded Elena Mizulina.

Yevstifeyev is married and has two children.
