= Pavel Grigoryevich Demidov =

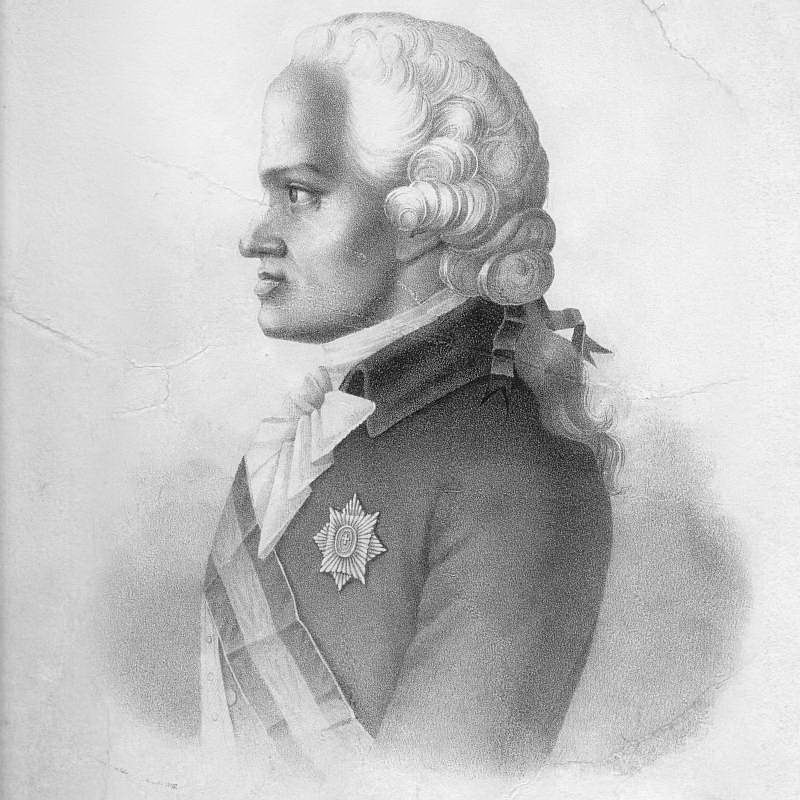
Pavel Grigoryevich Demidov

Pavel Grigoryevich Demidov (Russian: Павел Григорьевич Демидов; 1738–1821) was a Russian traveller and patron of scientific education. He was from the Demidov family.

== Life ==
A grandson of Nikita Demidov, he created the mineralogical museum in Moscow in 1775. (now known as the Vernadsky State Geological Museum or the Museum of Earth History), in 1803 the Demidov Lyceum at Yaroslavl, and in 1805 the Demidov Scientific Institute at Saint Petersburg. He was also the founder of the university of Tobolsk, Moscow's Botanical Gardens (the Neskuchny Gardens), the Demidov chair in Natural history at Moscow University and an annual prize for Russian literature, awarded by the Academy of Sciences. In total, he gave 1.1 million roubles to scientific institutions. The bronze Demidovsky Pillar was set up as a memorial to him at Yaroslavl in 1828.
