= Demidovsky Pillar, Yaroslavl =

Doric column in Yaroslavl, Russia

Coordinates: 57.62504°N 39.89722°E

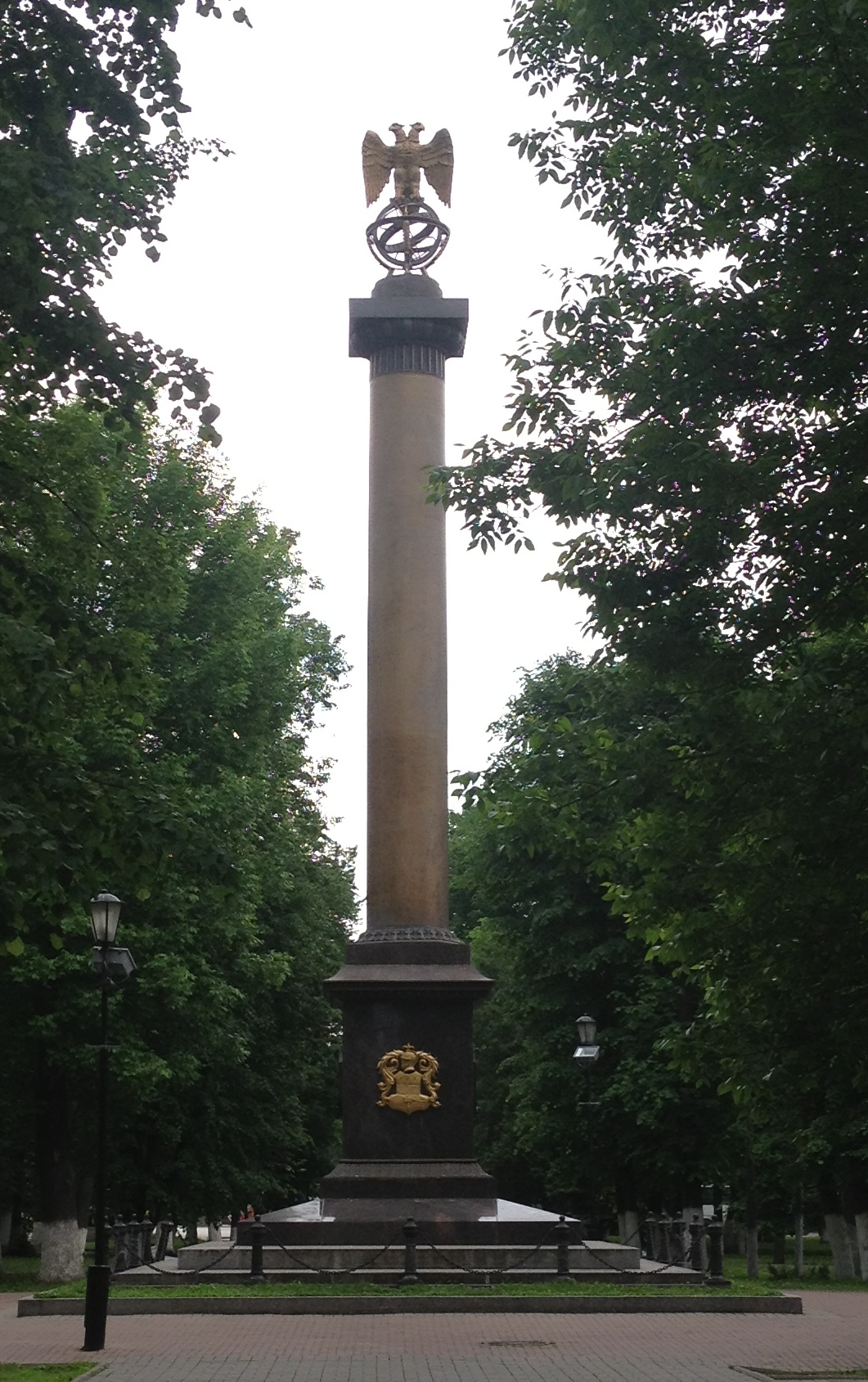
The Demidovsky Pillar in 2013.

The Demidovsky Pillar in Yaroslavl is a bronze Doric column set up as a memorial to Pavel Grigoryevich Demidov - founder of the Yaroslavl Demidov School of Higher Sciences. It was set up on 6 (18) March 1829 in Ilyinsky Square in Yaroslavl from funds given by the town's inhabitants and other voluntary donors. It is 12m high on a granite base, with its interior filled up with sand and its top crowned with a bronze armillary sphere with a gilded eagle perching on it.

After the February Revolution the eagle (a symbol of autocracy) and sphere were removed and in 1931 the monument itself was finally dismantled. In 2004 the city history museum mooted the restoration of the pillar, an idea supported by the town's mayor V. Volonchunas, and this occurred in 2005 at the city's expense, with the re-opening occurring on 9 December 2005. It was set up in Mira Boulevard, which was renamed for the occasion from Chelyuskintsev Park.
