= Italian Wikipedia =

Italian-language edition of Wikipedia

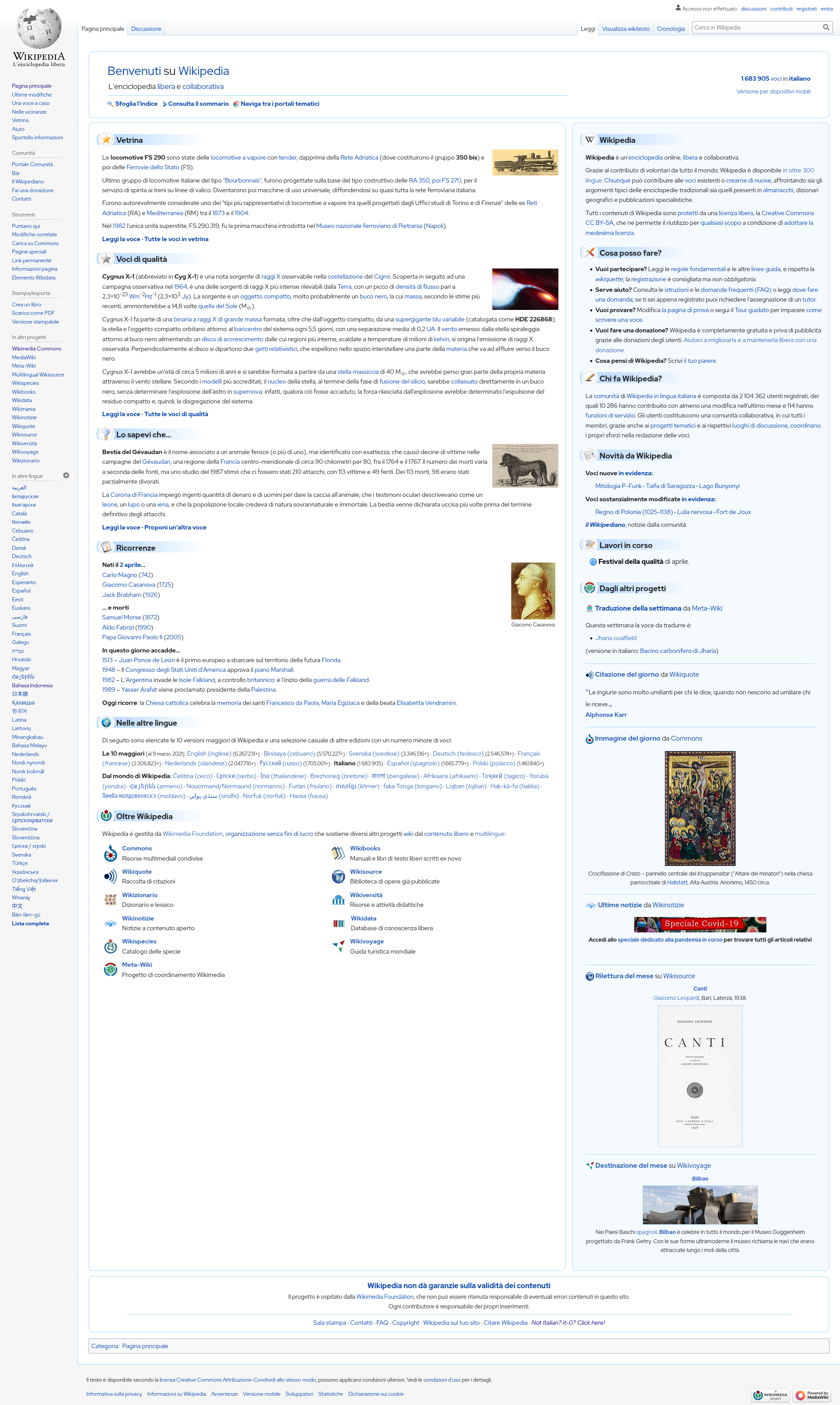
- Screenshot Main page of the Italian Wikipedia in April 2021
- Website type: Internet encyclopedia project
- Available in: Italian
- Owner: Wikimedia Foundation
- Creator: Italian-language Wikipedia community
- Website: it.wikipedia.org
- Commercial: No
- Registration: Optional
- Users: 3.17 million (as of 27 September 2026)
- Launched: 10 May 2001; 25 years ago
- Content license: Creative Commons Attribution/ Share-Alike 4.0 (most text also dual-licensed under GFDL); Media licensing varies

The Italian Wikipedia (Italian: Wikipedia in italiano) is the Italian-language edition of Wikipedia. This edition was created on 10 May 2001, and first edited on 11 June 2001. As of 27 September 2026, it has 1,988,570 articles and more than 3,169,512 registered accounts. It is the 9th-largest Wikipedia by the number of articles (after the English, Swedish, German, Dutch, French, Cebuano, Russian, and Spanish editions).

== History ==
As early as March 2001, Jimmy Wales, the creator and co-founder of the original English language Wikipedia, had proposed the creation of parallel Wikipedia projects in other languages. The Italian-language version was among the first ones to be created, in May 2001. The original URL was italian.wikipedia.com, while the standardized ISO 639 address it.wikipedia.com became active a few days later. Afterwards, Wikipedia sites switched their domains from wikipedia.com to wikipedia.org. The first pages (around five hundred) were simply untranslated copies from the English-language Wikipedia; the first edits were made from 11 June 2001, onwards.

One of the earlier edits was an appeal to help Nupedia; the first entries on the Italian Wikipedia were the pages on Italian writers Dante Alighieri, Petrarch, Manzoni, and other Italian writers. The edits were not numerous, and the priority was initially given to helping Nupedia; the lemmas were just twenty or thirty, and there were about ten users. With the end of the Nupedia project, the situation began to improve for the Italian Wikipedia: users started to sign in, and the functions of administrators and semi-protection were implemented. This happened by 2004; the number of articles was 56,000 by then.

In August 2005 the Italian Wikipedia overtook the Spanish and Portuguese language editions, becoming the 8th largest edition by article count. The primary reason for the rapid leap from 56,000 to 64,000 articles was an automated bot which created stub articles on more than 8,000 municipalities of Spain in an operation dubbed "Comuni spagnoli".

On 8 September 2005, the Italian Wikipedia overtook the Dutch Wikipedia and one day later, on 9 September, it passed 100,000 articles. On 11 September, it overtook the Swedish Wikipedia, becoming the fifth-largest language edition. Again, automated scripts contributed heavily to the growth. For instance, a bot created more than 35,000 articles on municipalities of France. However, it was overtaken by the Polish edition on 23 September 2005.

In June 2006, Italian Wikipedia users independently created the Template:Bio (with "Bio" being a diminutive of biografia, "biography"). On 23 October, the Polish version again surpassed the Italian Wikipedia by number of articles. As of 16 October 2006, the registered number of users was 100,000 (90 of which were administrators).

In 2007, the Italian Wikipedia adopted an Exemption Doctrine Policy, shared with other Wikipedias. In the same year, on 21 May, there were more than 300,000 entries. On 22 January 2008, the entries were 400,000; on 3 October, they were 500,000. The number of users had reached 250,000.

In 2009 the Italian Wikipedia was awarded the Premiolino, the oldest and most prestigious Italian journalism prize, in the new media category.

On 22 June 2010, it passed 700,000 articles (Robie House – 700,000th article). On 28 September 2010, the Italian Wikipedia overtook the Polish Wikipedia, becoming the 4th largest edition, though in October 2010 the numbers on both Wikipedias were very close, and as of 2011 the Polish Wikipedia was in the lead again. On 12 May 2011, it passed 800,000 articles. On the same day, it overtook the Polish Wikipedia. On 12 March 2012, it passed 900,000 articles. On 22 January 2013, it passed 1,000,000 articles.

In April 2016, the project had 2,233 active editors who made at least five edits in that month, and as of March 2022, the project has 121 administrators.

== 2011 mass blanking protest ==
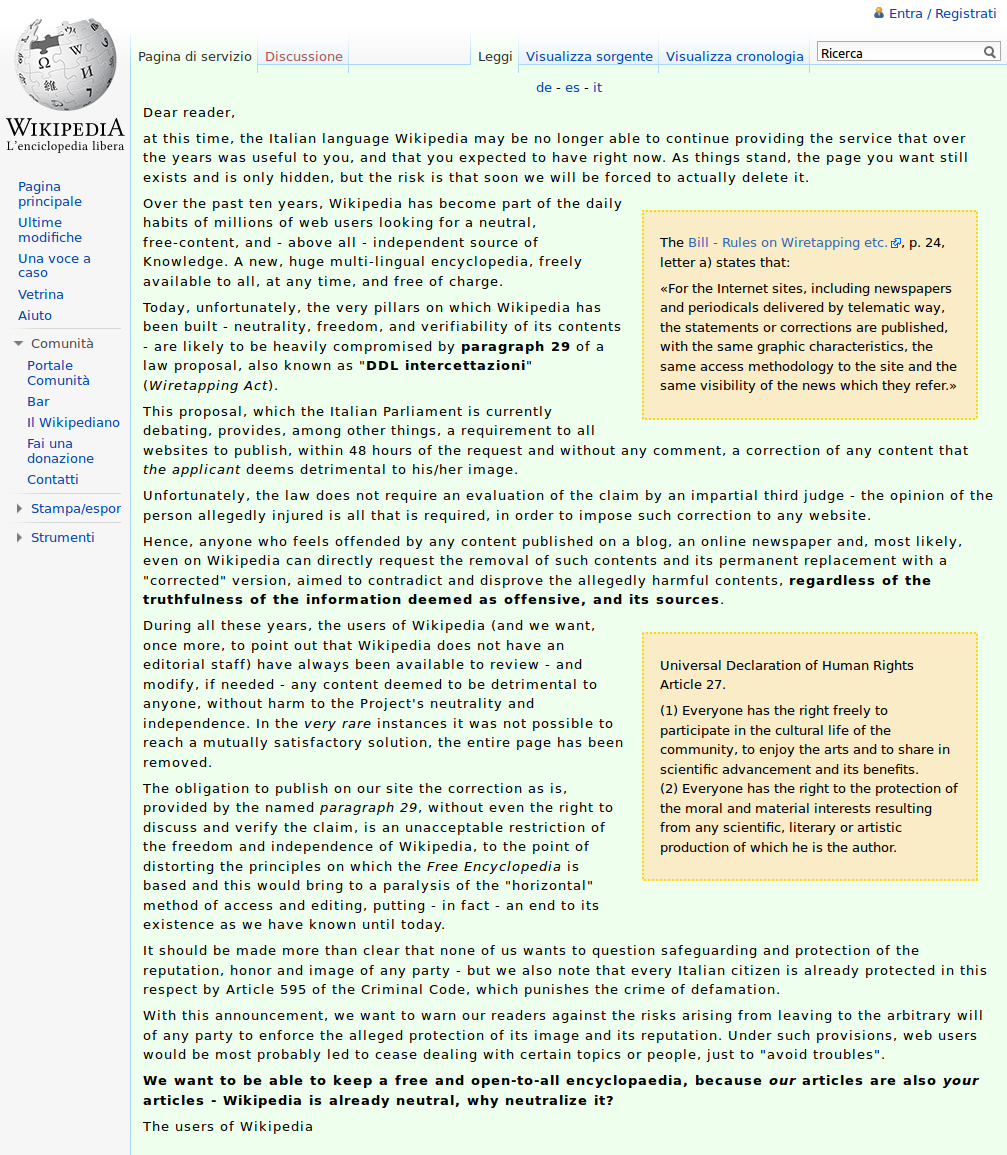
From 4 to 6 October 2011, a knowledge blackout was in place. During this time, all pages on the Italian Wikipedia project were redirected to this one-page Manifesto.

From 4 to 6 October 2011, following a decision adopted by volunteers of the Italian Wikipedia community, a knowledge blackout was in place. During this time, all of the site's articles were hidden and the website was blocked by its administrators, as a protest against the DDL intercettazioni (Wiretapping Bill), which was being debated at the time in the Chamber of Deputies of the Italian parliament.

The controversy largely centered on paragraph 29 of the proposed bill. According to a public statement by editors of the Italian Wikipedia:

At this time, the Italian language Wikipedia may be no longer able to continue providing the service that over the years was useful to you, and that you expected to have right now. As things stand, the page you want still exists and is only hidden, but the risk is that soon we will be forced by Law to actually delete it.

Today, unfortunately, the very pillars on which Wikipedia has been built—neutrality, freedom, and verifiability of its contents—are likely to be heavily compromised by paragraph 29 of a law proposal, also known as "DDL intercettazioni" (Wiretapping Act). This proposal, which the Italian Parliament is currently debating, provides, among other things, a requirement to all websites to publish, within 48 hours of the request and without any comment, a correction of any content that the applicant deems detrimental to his/her image.

Unfortunately, the law does not require an evaluation of the claim by an impartial third judge—the opinion of the person allegedly injured is all that is required, in order to impose such correction to any website. Hence, anyone who feels offended by any content published on a blog, an online newspaper and, most likely, even on Wikipedia would have the right for a statement ("correction") to be shown, unaltered, on the page, aimed to contradict and disprove the allegedly harmful contents, regardless of the truthfulness of the information deemed as offensive, and its sources.

The bill allowed for a fine of between €9,500 and €12,000.

This was the first time that a Wikipedia had blanked all its content to protest. The Wikimedia Foundation officially supported the decision of the Italian Wikipedia by a statement released the same day. As of 5 October 2011 the manifesto, which replaced the Italian Wikipedia, had been viewed approximately 8 million times. On 6 October 2011, the website content was restored, with a banner across the top of each page explaining the reason for the protest.

== Other shutdowns ==
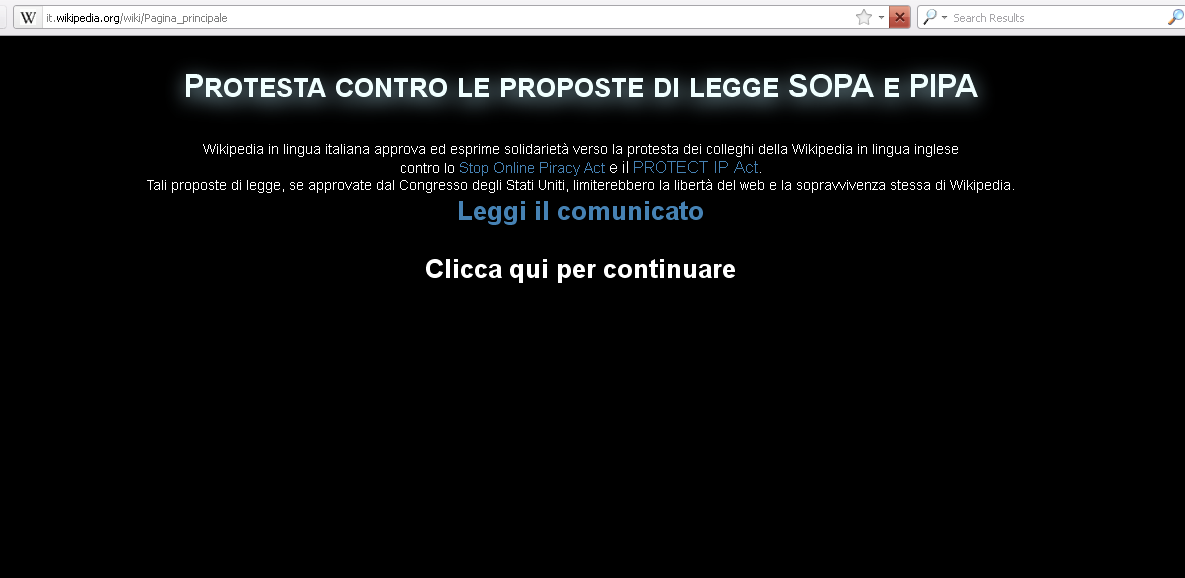
The main page on 18 January 2012. The body text reads, "The Italian Wikipedia welcomes and expresses its solidarity with the protests of its colleagues on the English Wikipedia against the Stop Online Piracy act and the PROTECT IP Act. These bills, if approved by the U.S. Congress, would limit the freedom of the web and the very survival of Wikipedia."

On 18 January 2012, the English Wikipedia was shut down for 24 hours, following a decision by contributors to protest against two bills being examined by the Congress of the United States: the Stop Online Piracy Act and the Protect Intellectual Property Act. On that day, the Italian Wikipedia redirected users from its own main page to a black page with a message of support for the decision of the English encyclopedia. Users could then click to access the Italian encyclopedia's content normally.

On 10 July 2012, when the Russian Wikipedia was closed to protest State Duma’s debating of amendments to the law "On information" (Law Project No. 89417-6), the Italian Wikipedia displayed a site-wide banner supporting the protest.

The Italian Wikipedia approves of, and is in solidarity with, the Russian Wikipedia's protest against the proposed law being debated in the Duma. This change in the law, if approved, would permit the Russian government to create a blacklist preventing access to specific websites, like the Great Chinese Firewall.

In November 2012, messages appeared on the Italian Wikipedia protesting the Italian Senate's Bill #3491, 3204, 3.400 and especially 3.207.

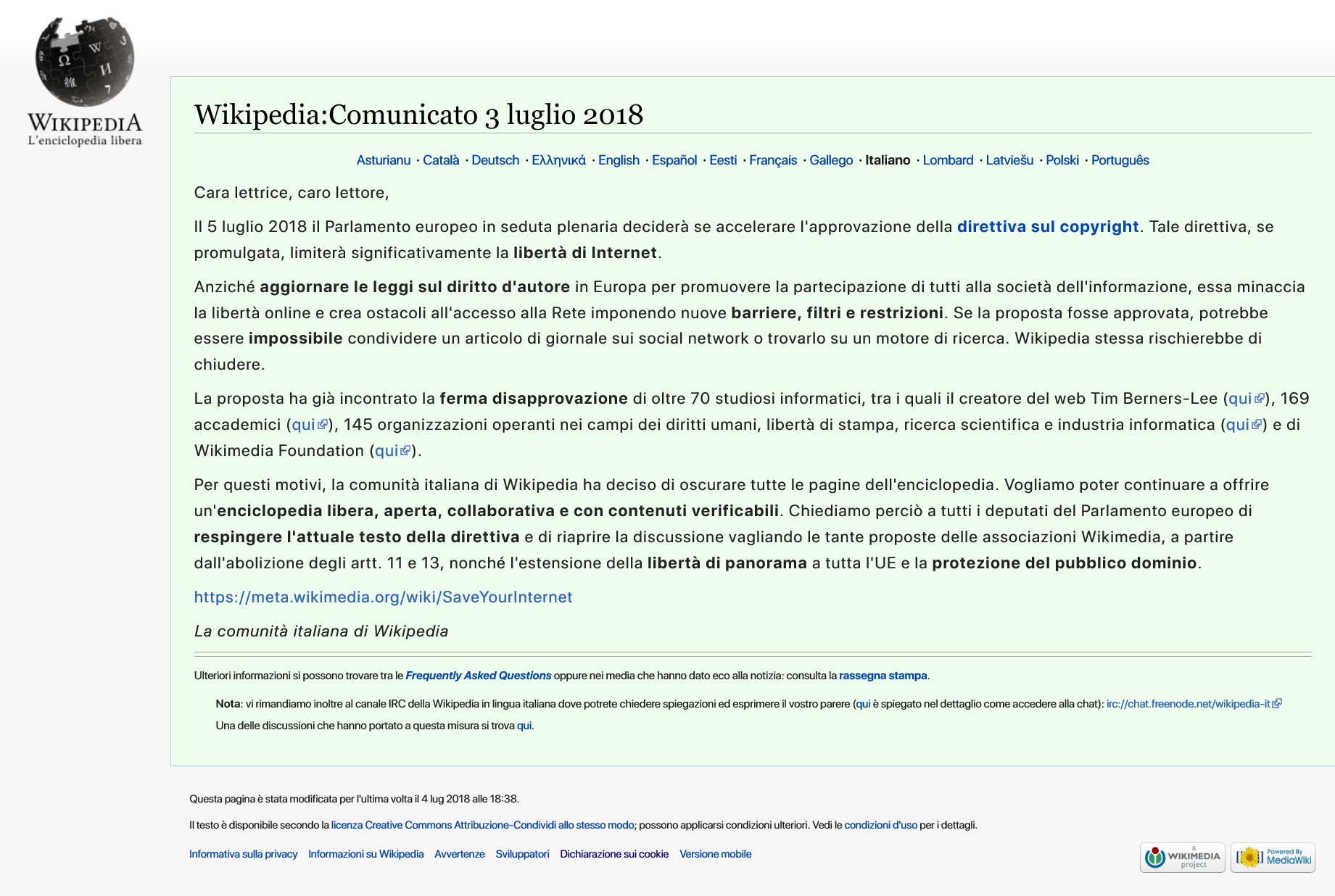
Screenshot of Italian Wikipedia on 3 July 2018

From 3 to 5 July 2018, to protest the Directive on Copyright in the Digital Single Market, the Italian Wikipedia displayed a site-wide banner supporting the protest, and disabled all searches and contributions.

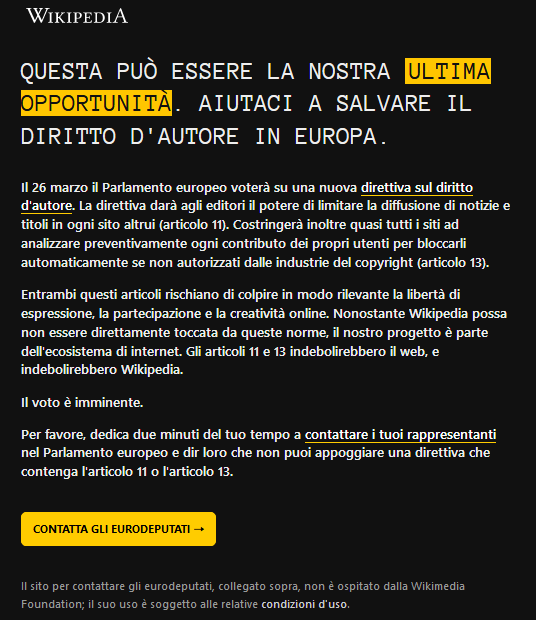
Message shown on Italian Wikipedia on 25 March 2019

From 25 March 2019 for the following 24 hours, Italian Wikipedia contents were not accessible, replaced by a message encouraging the readers to contact their European Parliament representatives to vote against Article 11 and Article 13 of the European Copyright Directive to be discussed on 26 May.

== Features ==
- The Italian Wikipedia currently accepts free images licensed under the GFDL and Creative Commons. Fair use images have been rejected since April 2006 due to potential copyright problems, and many of them were subsequently replaced during 2007 with equivalents which follow Italian law.
- The Italian Wikipedia has used automated scripts to create articles, much like the English Wikipedia.
- Administrators are elected through a vote; a minimal quorum of 65–70 voters and 80% of support votes are required if the request is to be considered successful. Any administrator is automatically open to recall after a year of service. The community then decides whether to let them keep the role or not with a vote. Administrators who have been inactive (have not used any administrative tools such as the "delete" or "block" buttons) for six months automatically lose their privileges.
- Unlike English Wikipedia or Russian Wikipedia, there are optional disclaimers that may be displayed in the articles.
