= DDL intercettazioni =

Piece of legislation

DDL Intercettazioni or the Wiretapping Bill is a piece of legislation put periodically before the Italian Parliament, but never passed.

In the XVI legislature, that version of the bill provided for a measure (paragraph 29), found to be in violation of free speech by the public opinion.

== Background ==
The Max Planck Institute for Foreign and International Criminal Law calculated that in 2006, a higher proportion of Italians had had their phones tapped than citizens of any other European country. Opposing the confidentiality of information sources, the press often obstructs the only way for the acquisition of evidence about the news leaking of the wiretapped talks and for the identification of the 'Deep Throat'.

== XV legislature ==
After the SISMI-Telecom scandal, "fears of a maxi-blackmail against the politics" were raised in the government: so it adopted a first decree in order to destroy illegally captured wire-taps. The Constitutional Court struck down the main provisions of this decree.

Prime minister Romano Prodi complained about the political use of the wiretapping leaks; his government proposed a Bill on this issue, but it has never passed through as law.

== XVI legislature ==
Prime Minister Silvio Berlusconi and his allies have been subject of a number of wire-taps which have been published. For instance, in December 2007 the audio recording of a phone call between Berlusconi, then leader of the opposition parties, and Agostino Saccà (general director of RAI) were published by the magazine L'espresso, attracting strong criticism of Berlusconi from several media sources.

The law was proposed by the Berlusconi IV Cabinet and presented by Italian Minister of Justice Angelino Alfano in 2008, approved by the Camera in 2009, then modified by the Italian Senate and brought up again for approval at the Camera in October 2011. Supporters argued that courts were authorising the practice of wiretapping too often, and that the media should not be privy to the results. Berlusconi said in 2010 that legislation was necessary to protect the privacy of Italian citizens.

=== Paragraph 29 ===
The controversy largely centered around paragraph 29 of the proposed bill, which was being debated in the Chamber of Deputies of the Italian parliament.

The proposed bill would have empowered anyone who believes themselves to have been defamed or misrepresented by the content of a publication or website, even if the content were true, to enforce publication of a reply, uneditable and uncommented, in the same place and with equal prominence of the related content, with no right of protest against the requested rewrite or any inaccuracies contained, within 48 hours and without any prior evaluation of the claim by a judge. If after 48 hours the reply hadn't been published, the person requesting the reply may eventually appeal to a civil court which would assess the request and evaluate the disputed content. The sanction would be a fine between €9,500 and €12,000. According to editors of the Italian Wikipedia:

"neutrality, freedom, and verifiability of [Wikipedia's] contents are likely to be heavily compromised by paragraph 29 of a law proposal, also known as "DDL intercettazioni" (Wiretapping Act). This proposal, which the Italian Parliament is currently debating, provides, among other things, a requirement to all websites to publish, within 48 hours of the request and without any comment, a correction of any content that the applicant deems detrimental to his/her image."

"Unfortunately, the law does not require an evaluation of the claim by an impartial third judge – the opinion of the person allegedly injured is all that is required, in order to impose such correction to any website. Hence, anyone who feels offended by any content published on a blog, an online newspaper and, most likely, even on Wikipedia would have the right for a statement ("correction") to be shown, unaltered, on the page, aimed to contradict and disprove the allegedly harmful contents, regardless of the truthfulness of the information deemed as offensive, and its sources."

=== Strikes and protests ===
Italian journalists went on strike on 9 July 2010, in protest over the wiretapping bill.

All pages on the Italian version of Wikipedia on 4 October 2011 were redirected to a statement opposing the proposed legislation. The statement is available in Italian, English, Catalan, Esperanto, Dutch, French, German, Greek, Hebrew, Portuguese, Romanian and Spanish.

Despite its approval in Senate, the Bill was not approved by the Chamber of Deputies during the XVI Legislature and was not repeated in the next parliamentary term.

== XVII legislature ==
Justice Minister Andrea Orlando, on 20 April 2016, said: "Wiretaps are means of investigation absolutely essential; there are steps that must be turned into legislative acts which have to avoid misuse and their dissemination even when they are not about crimes. I think they go transposed the circular of the prosecution offices addressing the issue (...) The advantage is that the law does not change with the change of the attorney. If there was a pronouncement of the Consiglio superiore della magistratura (CSM) might help to have a consistent practice".

This issue has been dealt with in a bill proposed by the Chamber of deputies; passed through in the Senate, became law authorizing Government to decree in this matter.
