= On Protecting Children from Information Harmful to Their Health and Development =

Russian federal law

"On Protection of Children from Information Harmful to Their Health and Development" (Russian: О защите детей от информации, причиняющей вред их здоровью и развитию; Federal law of the Russian Federation no. 436-FZ of 2010-12-29) is a federal law of the Russian Federation. It was enacted on 29 December 2010 as a content rating law.

== Introduction ==
An amending law was enacted in July 2012. That law contained changes to other laws, introducing a "child-protecting" Internet blacklist not related to this law, so Russian Wikipedia protested the bill with a blackout.

The law prohibits the distribution of "harmful" material among minors, including material which "may elicit fear, horror, or panic in children", or depicts violence, unlawful activities, substance abuse, or self-harm. It has been amended twice; an amendment in 2012 instituted a mandatory content rating system for material distributed through an "information and telecommunication network" (covering television and the internet), and, in other laws, established a blacklist for censoring websites which describe suicide, glorify illegal drugs, or contain child pornography. A second amendment, the Russian anti-LGBTQ law, was passed in 2013; it added "propaganda" promoting "non-traditional sexual relationships" as a class of harmful content under the law.

== Formation of the age restrictions system ==
During the Soviet period, there was a three-tier system of age restrictions, recorded in the permit issued to each film (domestic or foreign):

- For any audience (0);
- For any audience (except for special children's sessions) (6);
- For those over the age of 16.

There was a measure of refusal to issue permits to the film, which implied political, moral, and ethical motives. In the late 1990s and early 21st century, at the initiative of Goskino, the Russian Ministry of Culture, the Russian Ministry of Education, the Film Institute, and public organizations, the system was revised. At first (by order of the Russian Ministry of Culture of March 5, 2001 No. 192) two more age ratings (12 and 18 years) were added, which is more in line with the international accepted practice (for example, ratings of the American Film Association). In 2005, at the initiative of teachers and psychologists, another category (14 years) was added.

=== The modern system of classification of information products ===
On September 1, 2012, after the federal law on the protection of children from information harmful to their health and development came into force, the following age classification of information products was introduced in Russia.

==== Information products for children under the age of six (0+) ====
alt =

alt =

Information products for children under the age of six may include information products containing information that does not harm the health and (or) development of children (including information products containing episodic non-naturalistic images justified by its genre and (or) plot or a description of physical and (or) mental violence (with the exception of sexual violence), provided that good triumphs over evil and expresses compassion for the victim of violence and (or) condemnation of violence).

==== Information products for children over the age of six (6+) ====
alt =

alt =

Information products for children who have reached the age of six years old may include information products provided for in Article 7 of this Federal Law, as well as information products containing justified by its genre and (or) plot.

1. short-term and non-naturalistic depiction or description of diseases of a person (except for serious diseases) and (or) their consequences in a form that does not humiliate human dignity;
2. non-naturalistic portrayal or description of accident, trauma or traumatic events, disaster, or sudden (nonviolent) death without demonstrating their consequences that may cause children fear, horror, or panic;
3. episodic images or descriptions of these actions and (or) crimes that do not encourage the commission of antisocial actions and (or) crimes, provided that their admissibility is not substantiated and justified and a negative, condemning attitude towards the persons committing them is expressed.

==== Information products for children over the age of twelve (12+) ====
alt =

alt =

Information products for children who have reached the age of twelve years old can be classified as information products provided for in Article 8 of this Federal Law, as well as information products containing justified by its genre and (or) plot:

1. episodic depiction or description of cruelty and (or) violence (with the exception of sexual violence) without a naturalistic depiction of the process of deprivation of life or injury, provided that compassion for the victim and (or) negative, condemning attitude towards cruelty, violence (excluding violence) is expressed applied in cases of protection of the rights of citizens and the interests of society or states protected by law);
2. an image or description that does not encourage the commission of antisocial actions (including the consumption of alcoholic and alcohol-containing products, tobacco products, beer and drinks produced on its basis, participation in gambling, vagrancy or begging), occasional mention (without demonstration ) narcotic drugs, psychotropic and (or) intoxicating substances, provided that the admissibility of antisocial actions is not justified and not justified, a negative, condemning attitude towards them is expressed and an indication of the danger of consumption of these products, means, substances, products is contained;
3. not exploiting interest in sex and not having an exciting or offensive character, episodic non-naturalistic depictions or descriptions of sexual relations between a man and a woman, with the exception of depicting or describing acts of a sexual nature.

Usually, popular TV shows or films have such an age limit, which children under 12 may not understand, or which may seem uninteresting to them.

==== Information products for children over the age of sixteen (16+) ====
alt =

alt =

Information products for children who have reached the age of sixteen years old can be classified as information products provided for in Article 9 of this Federal Law, as well as information products containing justified by its genre and (or) plot:

1. an image or description of an accident, catastrophe, illness, death without a naturalistic display of their consequences, which can cause fear, horror or panic in children;
2. depiction or description of cruelty and (or) violence (with the exception of sexual violence) without a naturalistic depiction of the process of deprivation of life or maiming, provided that compassion for the victim and (or) negative, condemning attitude towards cruelty, violence (excluding violence, applied in cases of protection of the rights of citizens and the interests of society or the state protected by law);
3. information about narcotic drugs or about psychotropic and / or intoxicating substances, about the dangerous consequences of their consumption with the demonstration of such cases, provided that a negative or condemning attitude towards the consumption of such drugs or substances is expressed and an indication of the danger of their consumption is indicated;
4. some swear words and (or) expressions that are not related to obscene language;
5. not exploiting interest in sex or depicting or depicting offensive sex between a man and a woman, other than depicting or describing acts of a sexual nature.

Usually, popular TV shows or films have such an age limit, which children under 16 may not understand, or which may seem uninteresting to them. Also, TV shows such as music, game and talk shows, magazines and many documentaries shall conform to the provisions of that rating.

==== Information prohibited for distribution to children (18+) ====
alt =

alt =

1. encouraging children to commit actions that pose a threat to their life and (or) health, including causing harm to their health, suicide;
2. capable of causing children to desire to use narcotic drugs, psychotropic and (or) intoxicating substances, tobacco products, alcoholic and alcohol-containing products, beer and drinks made on its basis, take part in gambling, engage in prostitution, vagrancy or begging;
3. denies family values, promotes non-traditional sexual relations and forms disrespect for parents and (or) other family members;
4. containing information of a pornographic nature;
5. containing obscene language and other abusive words;
6. information justifying crimes, cruelty and other illegal actions and depicting the consequences of bloody violence, which does not exclude sexual violence;
7. about a minor who has suffered as a result of illegal actions (inaction).

=== Symbols for age information products ===
The color and shape of the mark is not legally defined. According to the Roskomnadzor Recommendations, the color and font of the sign for print media should differ from the color and style of the main font. Accordingly, there may be various options - for example, in a round, square and multi-colored version. The names of the classification may contain abbreviations "РСВР" - "Russian Age Rating System" and English: RARS - "Russian Age Rating System".

== See also ==
- Internet Restriction Bill (Federal law of Russian Federation no. 139-FZ of 2012-07-28)
