= Yaroslavl State University =

University in Yaroslavl, Russia

Yaroslavl 'Demidov' State University
- Ярославский государственный университет имени П. Г. Демидова
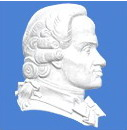
- Emblem of the Demidov State University of Yaroslavl
- Type: Public
- Established: 1803 - establishment 1918 - acquires university status 1970 - reestablished
- Affiliations: TEMPUS
- Rector: Alexander Russakov
- Students: 7,800
- Location: Yaroslavl, Russia
- Campus: urban
- Website: http://www.uniyar.ac.ru/
- Building details
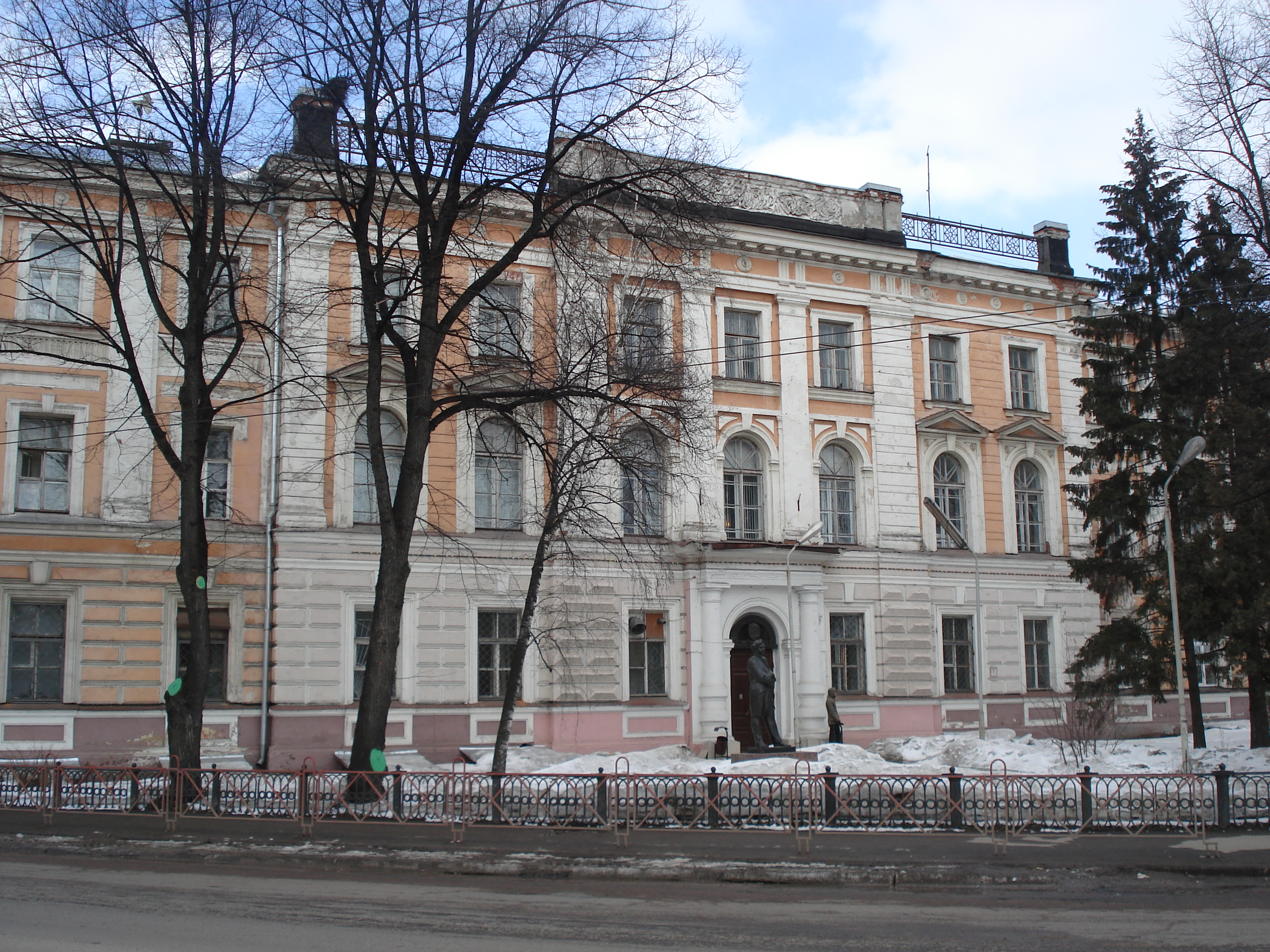
- The main building of the Demidov State University, Red Square.

University rankings

Regional – Overall
- QS Emerging Europe and Central Asia: 301-350 (2022)

The Yaroslavl Demidov State University (Russian: Ярославский государственный университет имени П. Г. Демидова) is an institution of higher education in Yaroslavl, Russia. In 1918, Yaroslavl Demidov State University became a successor university to the Demidov Lyceum, which was founded in 1803.

== History ==
=== The Higher School of Sciences ===
Pavel Grigoryevich Demidov established the Demidov Law School by private means in 1803. On June 18, 1803, Alexander the First, signed an Edict to the Senate about opening a higher educational institution in Yaroslavl. At first Demidov has been in contact with the Imperial authorities regarding the foundation of a university in Yaroslavl, even going so far as to promise his own private funding to the new institution; however, when this did not materialise the Imperial government decreed that the school was, upon opening, to have the same status as a university but to carry the title 'higher school of sciences' and thus to be considered junior only to the universities in Moscow and Saint Petersburg. At first, the new institution enrolled only 11 students, but this situation quickly changed and soon the school was able to found a number of new faculties, including, amongst others, law, mathematics, chemistry, political economy and financial science . In 1819 modern French and German were also added to the syllabus.

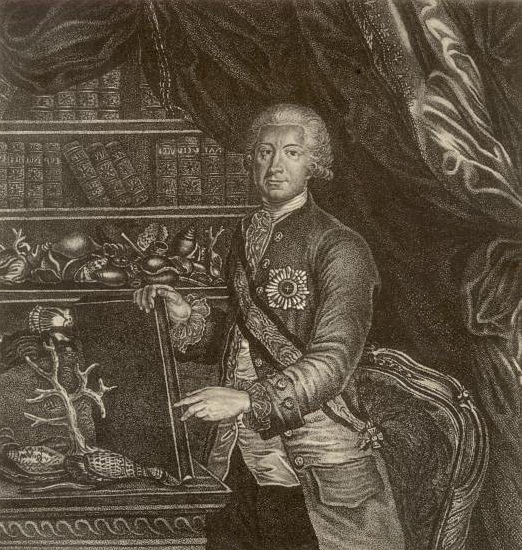
Pavel Grigoryevich Demidov

Twenty graduates from secondary schools could be educated at the school at the expense of its founder, and even these students had to be admitted from the nobility and other major estates of Yaroslavl Province. However, anyone who presented a certificate of general education or passed the school's entrance examination could be educated at their own expense. In the decrees of Alexander I, it was often emphasised that diplomas received from the School of Higher Sciences were equal to university degrees. In 1804, the first five students from the University of Moscow were sent to Yaroslavl to be educated. In 1805, a boarding school was opened so that scholars from other provinces could come to Yaroslavl and prepare themselves for the university's entrance exams, thus causing an exponential increase in the number of students.

Later however, the school's fortunes waned and by the mid-19th century the institution seemed to be in decline. For example, the Minister of Public Education Dmitry Tolstoy, who visited Yaroslavl in 1866, found one professor, four acting professors, one lecturer and 39 students at the Lyceum, and thus in the same year the transformation project of the Lyceum with jurisprudence as its special subject was prepared on his initiative. This later gained assent from Alexander II.

=== Demidov Judicial Lyceum ===
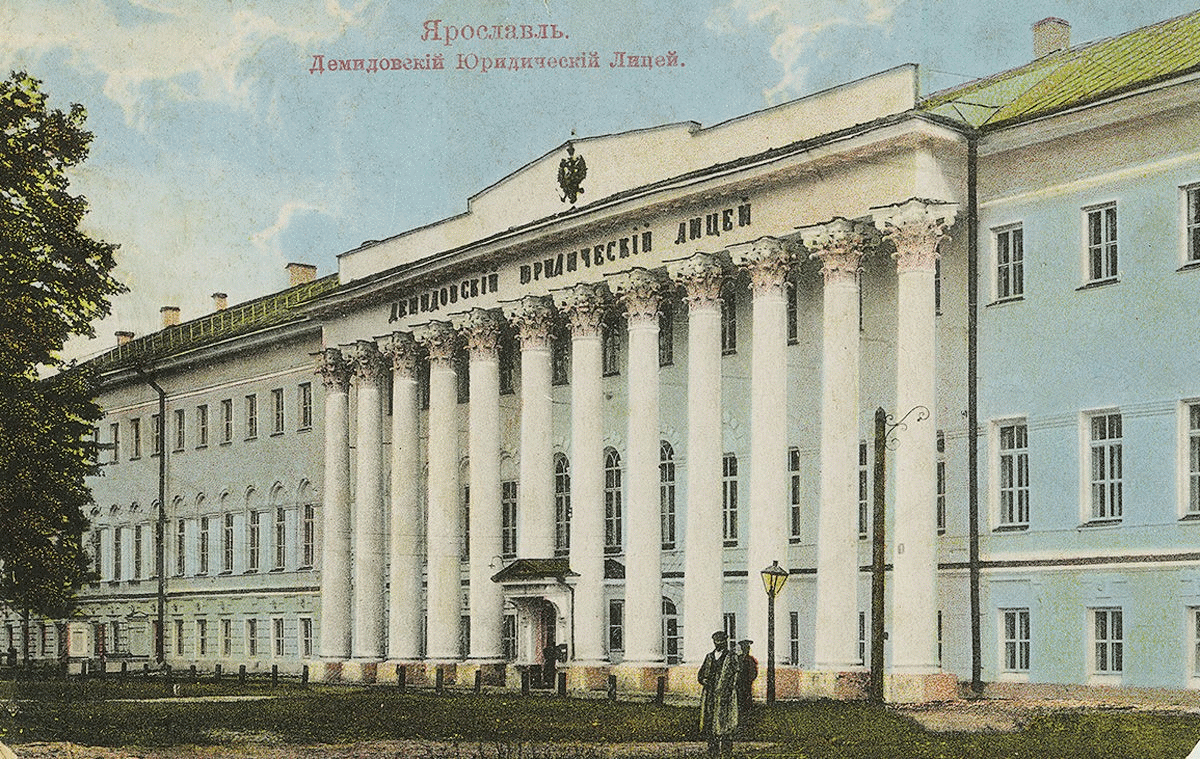
The main building of the Demidov Judicial Lyceum. This building was eventually demolished in 1931.

After its transformation into a Juridical Lyceum with higher educational, scientific and publishing status, Demidov's school in Yaroslavl enrolled over 900 students. The opening of the Demidov Juridical Lyceum took place on September 11, 1870, after around two years of preparation for the event. The judicial lyceum was from then on funded directly by the Imperial Russian Government, which mandated the institution of a four-year course which, upon successful completion, culminated in the student concerned being awarded the title 'candidate of judicial sciences'. Twenty scholarships which afforded government maintenance funds to their holders were also prepared and awarded each year.

After the first students graduated, the judicial lyceum's interim statute was made permanent, with Alexander II finally approving the new Statute on January 6, 1875. After this the judicial lyceum became very popular and by the late 19th century had such a large number of students that in terms of ranking it was to be found second only to the universities of Moscow and Saint Petersburg. Even by 1903, only the University of Kiev's faculty of law had successfully surpassed the student numbers of Yaroslavl's institution, so being ranked, along with Moscow and Petersburg's universities, above Demidov's school. In 1905 important changes were then also made to the organisation structure of the judicial lyceum, and resultantly, for the first time ever, the Lyceum's Council elected the school's director.

The possibility of transforming the Demidov judicial lyceum into a university began to be discussed in 1906. This initiative came from the Lyceum's Council and was supported by the larger community of Yaroslavl, the town's authorities and the Ministry of Public Education. Yaroslavl also found support in neighbouring provinces who promised their own material assistance so that a university could be founded close by and so aid the economic and education development of their own territories. The Yaroslavl town council then states that it was prepared to make a gift of 16 hectares of land and a lump-sum grant of 1 million roubles to go towards the establishment of the university. After the February Revolution of 1917, the Russian Provisional Government at last approved the project of transforming the Lyceum into a university, however the revolutionary events that transpired later in that same year prevented the implementation of these decisions.

=== University of 1918 ===
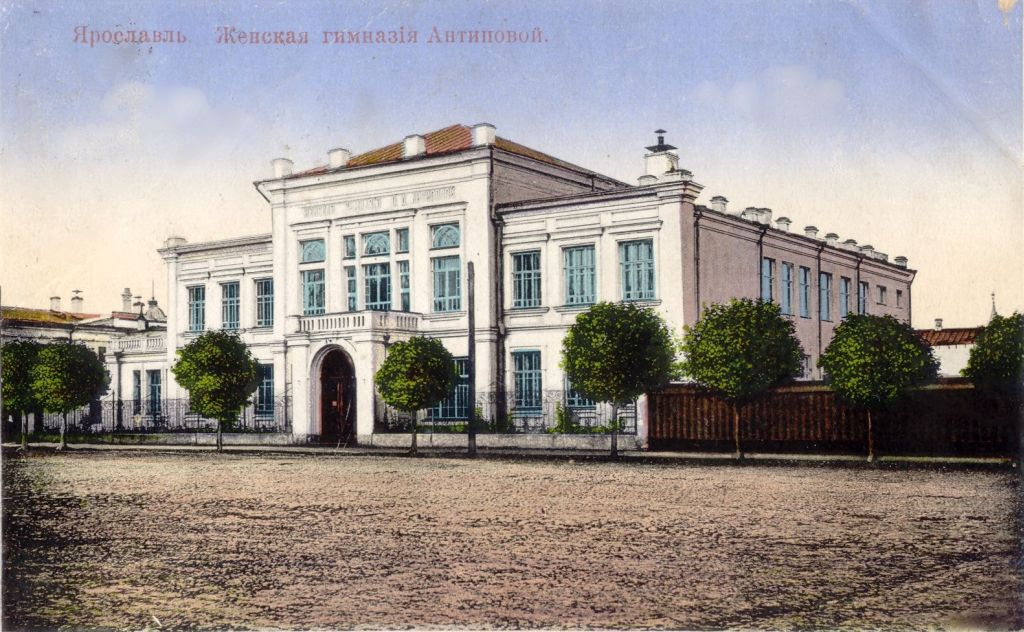
Girls' school of Praskovya Antipova. The building which first housed the Yaroslavl State University.

On August 7, 1918, Vladimir Lenin signed a decree to change the Demidov Juridical Lyceum into a university. The university had 29 departments, including Agronomic, Pedagogical, Medical and Law faculties, and an evening school. In 1924, after the death of Vladimir Lenin, the university was closed.

In accordance with the decree of the Council of People's Commissars of January 21, 1919, signed by Lenin, the Demidov Judicial Lyceum was transformed into Yaroslavl State University. In 1922 its organisation included the Yaroslavl Institute of Education which existed to train teachers, and the Yaroslavl branch of the Moscow Archaeological Institute, which prepared the critics, historians and archaeologists. The university then also had faculties for the social sciences, medicine, agronomy, teaching, and technical education. The university's rectors, during its existence, were Valerian Nikolaevich Shiryaev (1918–1922) and Vasily Potemkin (1922–1924).

In 1924, the State University of Yaroslavl was closed due to reorganisation of the new-born USSR's education system, all of which was caused by financial difficulties in the country. The institution's Faculty of Education once again became an independent institution, and for over ten years remained the only institute of higher education in the province – Yaroslavl State Pedagogical Institute. The main building of the Lyceum was set alight and burned on the night of 7 July 1918 (lasting until the next day) during the Yaroslavl Uprising and was finally demolished in 1929. In 1931, the Demidov pillar was also dismantled.

=== Re-establishment ===
On September 1, 1970, the university was reopened and enrolled 300 students. Since then the university has gone from strength to strength and is now often considered to be one of Russia's premier universities. In the 1990s and 2000s, the university underwent an extensive program of development and has been constantly expanding the number of subject areas it operates in, thus allowing for overall expansion of its academic activities and student population. Every year a number of students from renowned Western universities including, amongst others, the University of Oxford and University College London, attend Russian language courses at the university. The university also takes place in a number of exchange programs with universities and other higher educational institutions from around the world.

== Structure ==
=== Faculties ===
Yaroslavl Demidov State University has ten faculties.

- Biology and Ecology
- Computer science
- History
- Mathematics
- Socio-Political Sciences
- Psychology
- Physics
- Economics
- Law

- The Center of Russian Language and Russia Area Studies

=== Departments ===
Yaroslavl Demidov State University has four departments.

- International Relations Office
- Department of foreign languages
- Centre of New Information Technologies
- Internet Centre

•" Hostel"

== Campus ==
Building No.
Address
Department/Faculty
Coordinates
Photograph
I
14 Sovetskaya Street
(ул. Советская, д. 14)
Administration and rector's office, Faculty of Physics
57°37′58″N 39°53′14″E
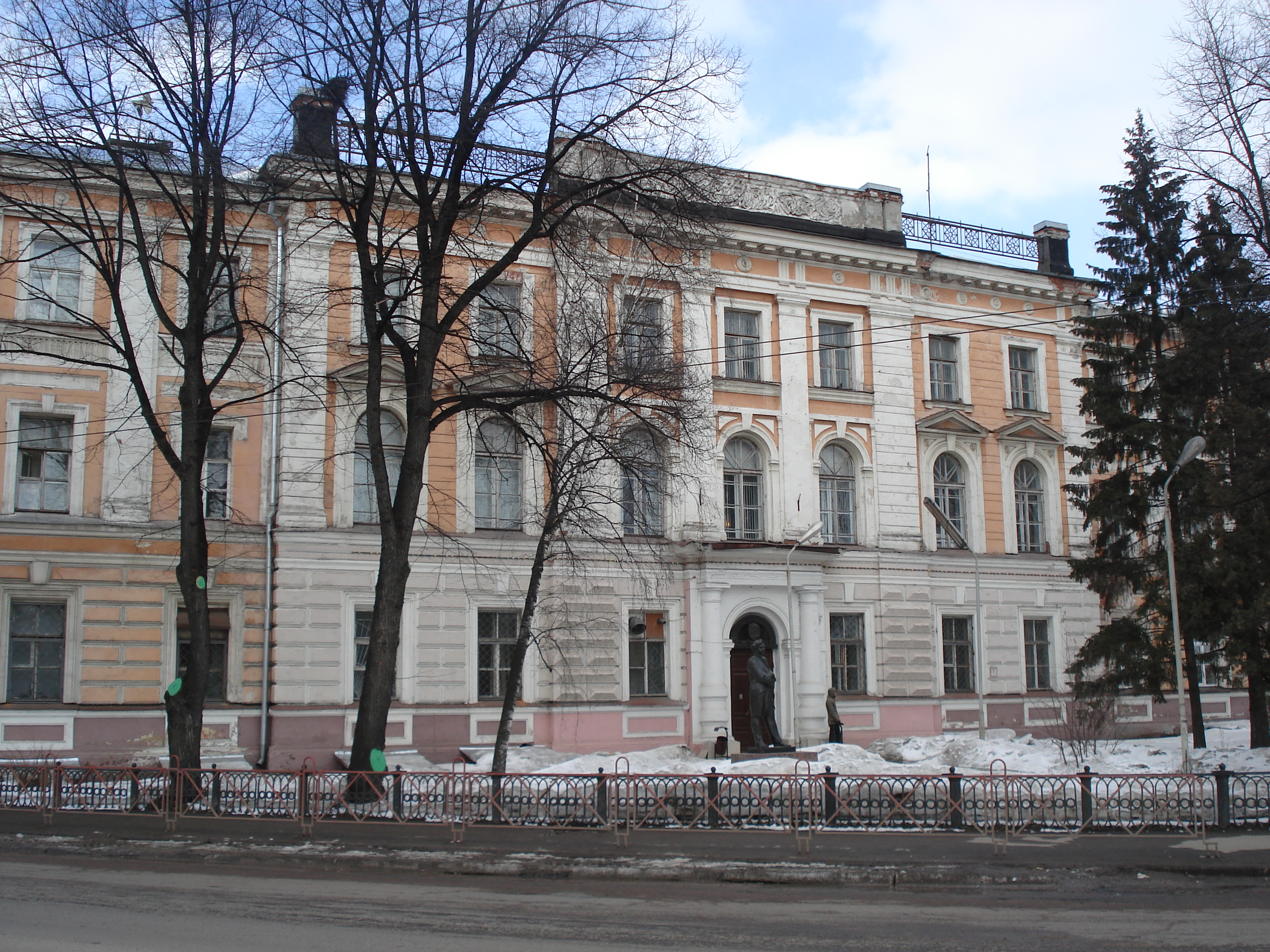
II
8/10 Kirova Street
(ул. Кирова, д. 8/10)
Faculty of Physics, Applications office
57°37′35″N 39°53′23″E
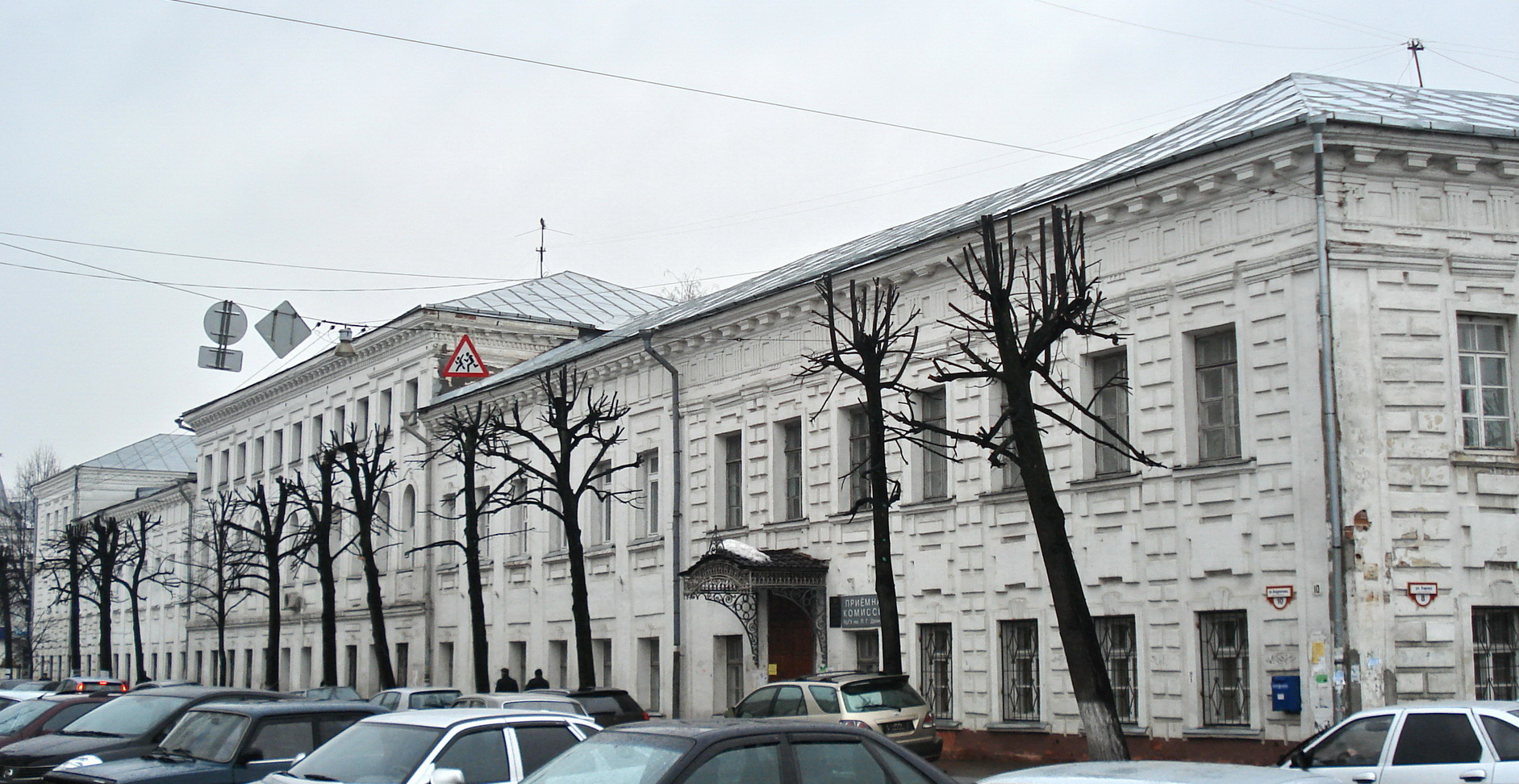
III
10 Sovetskaya Street
(ул. Советская, д. 10)
Faculty of History, Faculty of Social and Political Sciences
57°37′52″N 39°53′25″E

Hostel no 5
street, Gagarina 16

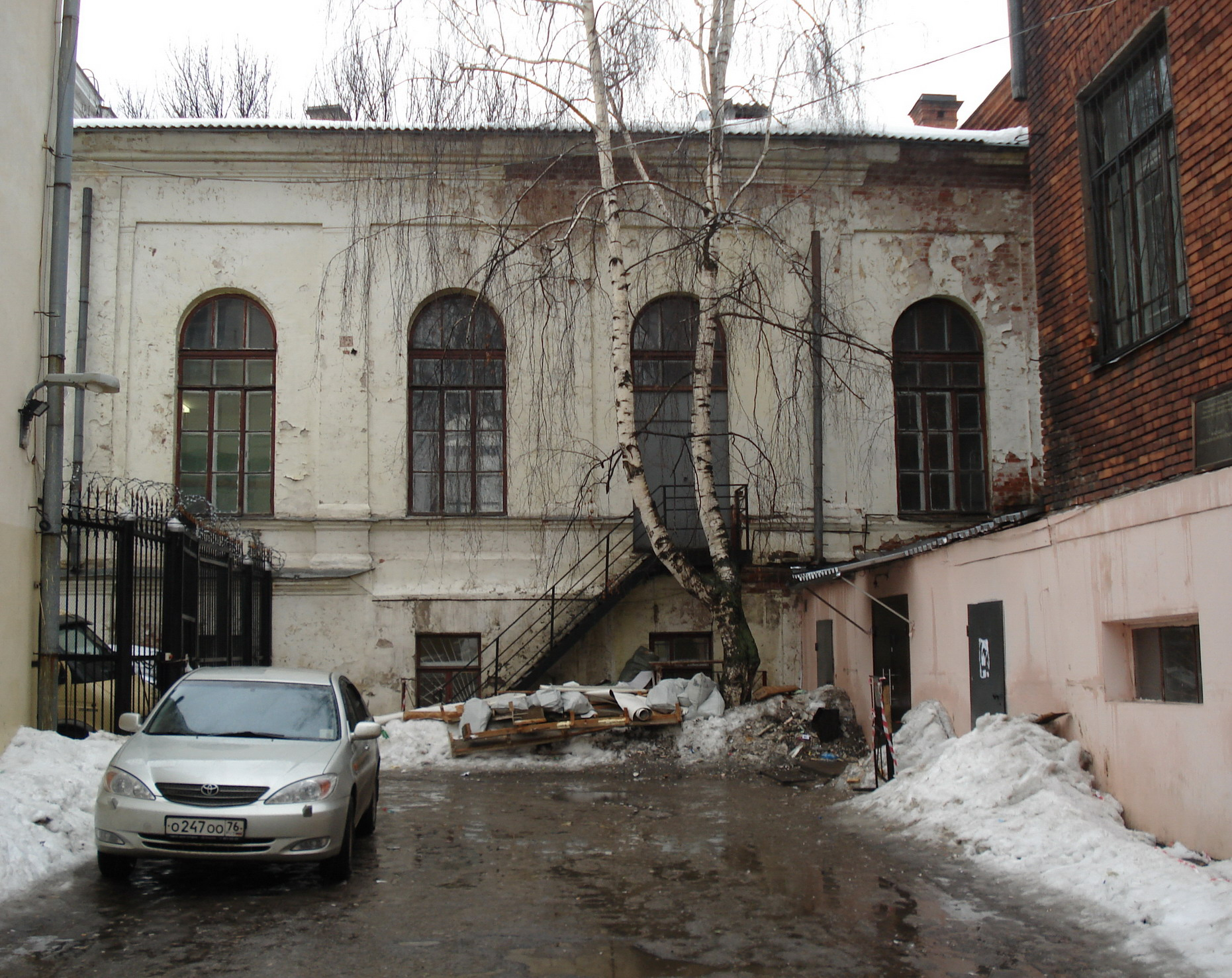
IV
9 Proezd Matrosova
(проезд Матросова, д. 9)
Faculty of Psychology, Faculty of Biology and Ecology
57°34′27″N 39°51′26″E

V
17d Prospekt Oktyabrya
(пр-кт Октября, д. 17д)
Faculty of Physics, laboratories
57°37′58.5″N 39°52′37″E
VI
3 Komsomolskaya Street
(ул. Комсомольская, д. 3)
Faculty of Economics
57°37′30.7″N 39°53′4″E
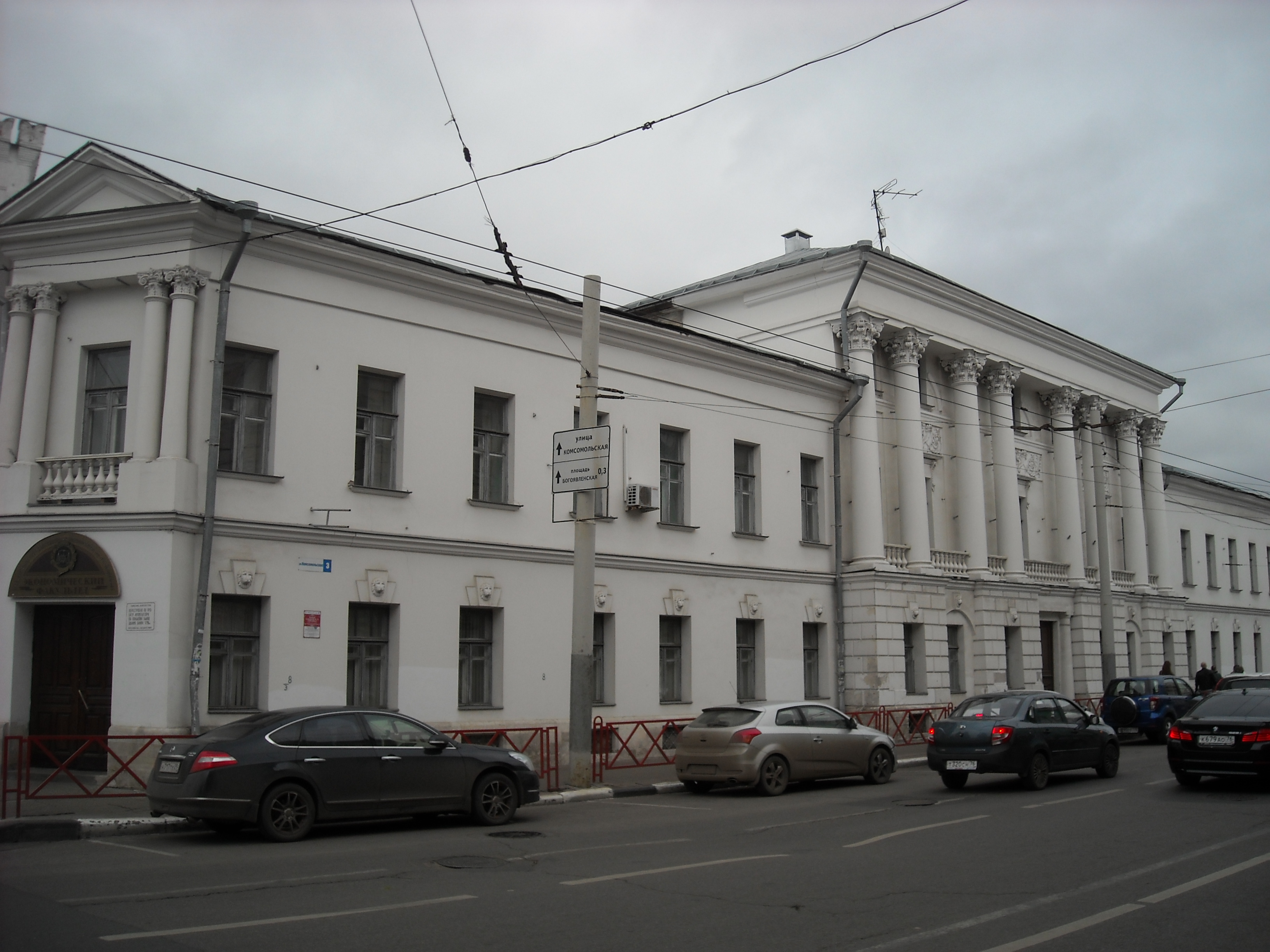
VII
144 Soyuznaya Street
(ул. Союзная, д. 144)
Faculty of Mathematics, Faculty of Computer Science
57°37′18″N 39°55′33″E
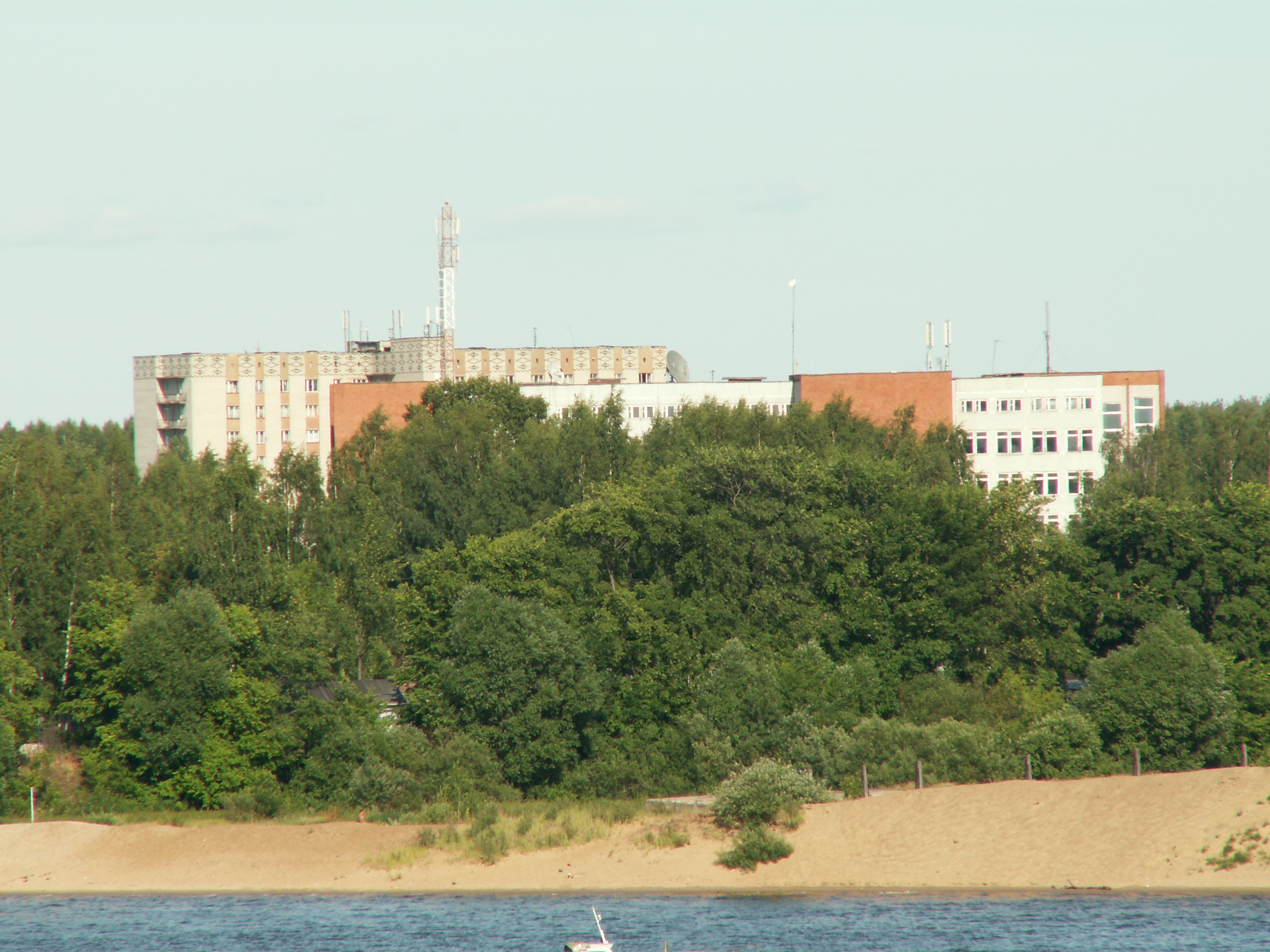
VIII
36a Sobinova Street
(ул. Собинова, д. 36а)
Faculty of Law
57°37′34.9″N 39°52′51.5″E
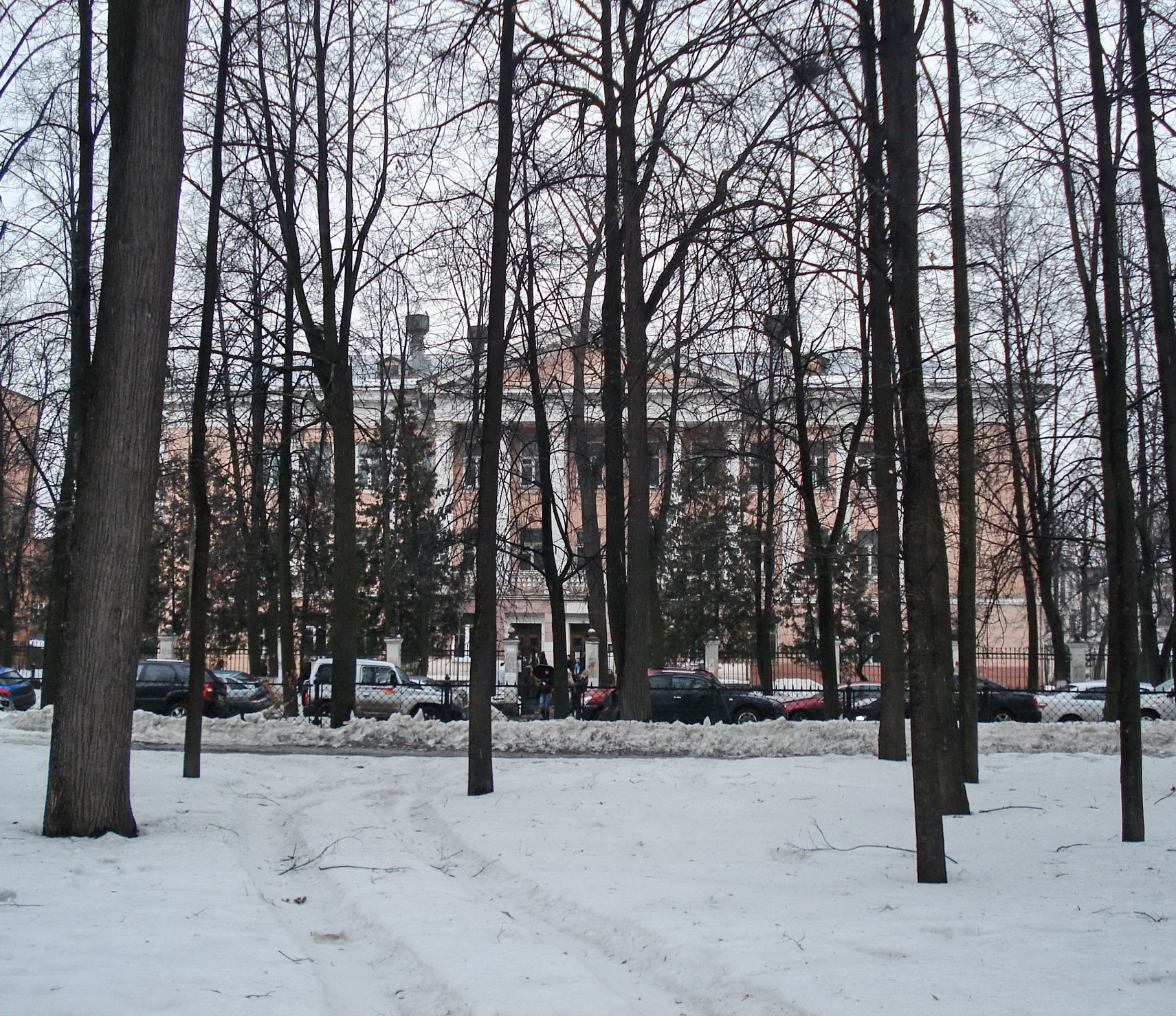
IX
14b Slepneva Street
(ул. Слепнева, 14б)
University college

X
1 Polushkina Rosha Street
(ул. Полушкина Роща, д. 1)
library, sports centre
57°38′43.5″N 39°52′37″E
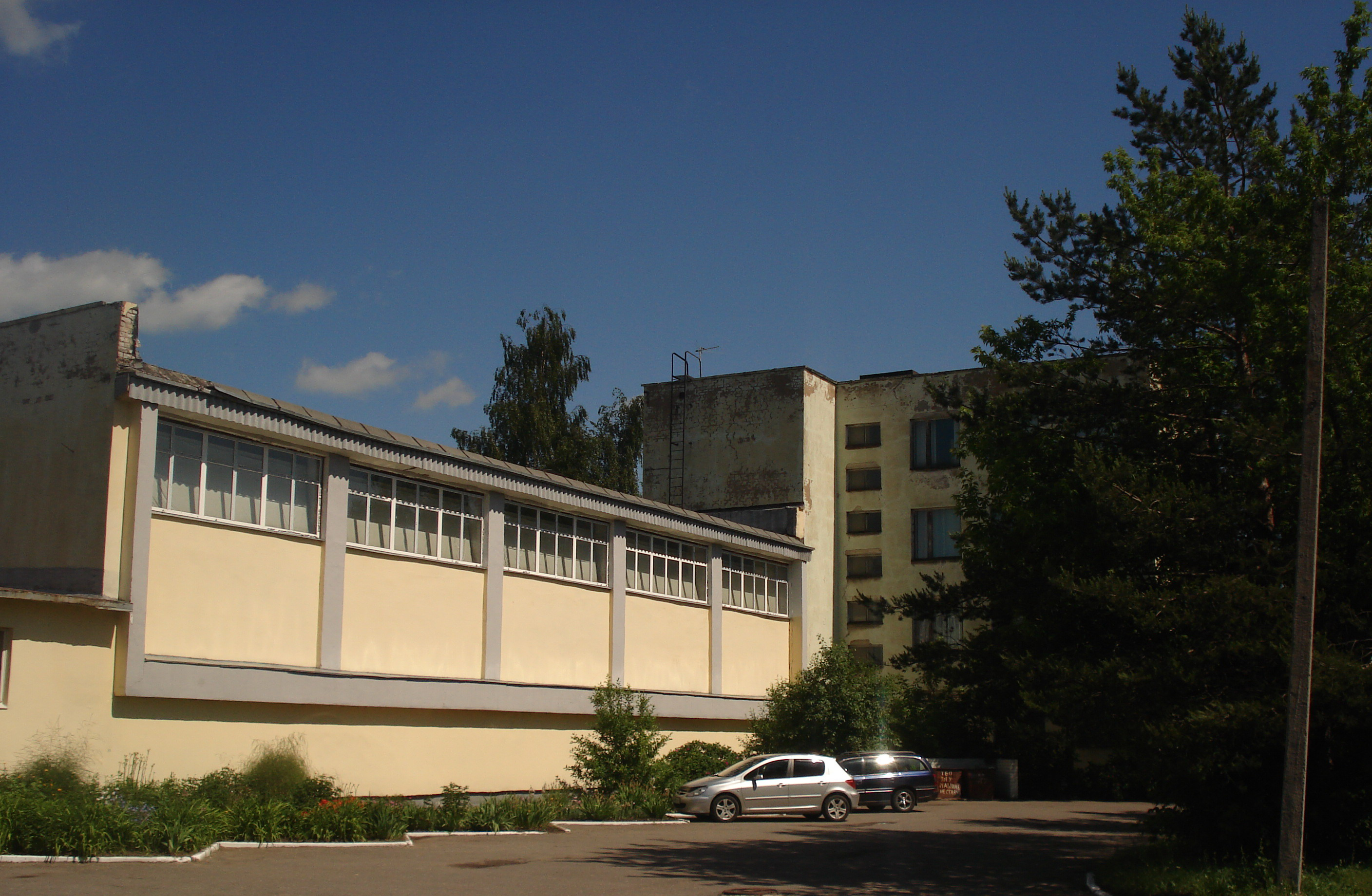

== See also ==
- Education in Russia
- List of universities in Russia
