= Russian Internet Restriction Bill =

Federal law of Russian Federation

- Long title: On Amendments to Federal Law On Protecting Children from Information Harmful to Their Health and the Development and Certain Legislative Acts of the Russian Federation
- Territorial extent: Russia
- Assented to: July 18, 2012
- Signed by: Vladimir Putin
- Signed: July 28, 2012
- Effective: July 30, 2012

Legislative history
- Introduced by: State Duma
- First reading: July 6, 2012
- Second reading: July 11, 2012
- Third reading: July 11, 2012
- Status: In force

Russian Internet restriction bill (Russian: закон о блокировке экстремистских сайтов; Federal law of Russian Federation no. 139-FZ of 2012-07-28) is a law passed by the Russian State Duma in 2012 which replaced the procedure of shutting down telecom operators by prosecutors' orders with a blacklist of Internet sites containing alleged child pornography, drug-related material, extremist material, and other content illegal in Russia. This blacklist was supposed to be implemented and supervised by a self-regulating NGO of Internet users, but it was never created and this duty was assumed by government agency Roskomnadzor. The bill also introduced several other changes in the law, including liability for providers of telecom services for failing to protect children. Some critics expressed concern that the bill could be used to censor the Internet. Others noted that it would be expensive and, as written, contained many technical problems that would negatively impact legitimate Internet use.

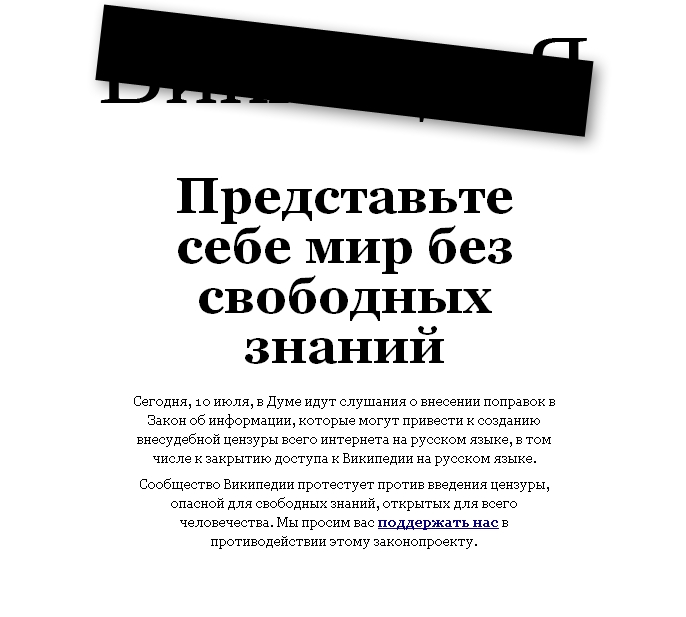
Appearance of the Russian Wikipedia site during the protest.

== History ==
According to the news agency RIA Novosti, Russia's League for Internet Safety (Russian: Лига безопасного интернета) pushed for the bill, after claiming to have broken up an Internet-based pedophile ring. Retired Communications and Mass Media Minister Igor Shchyogolev heads the group's board of trustees.

The bill no. 89417-6 was introduced in the Duma on June 7, 2012; it was given first reading on July 6 and both second and third readings on July 11. On July 18, 2012, the law was approved by the Federation Council.

The bill passed unanimously by the Russian Duma, with support of all four parties. Two lawmakers are publicly known for an active support of the Internet censorship bill: Ilya Ponomarev and Yelena Mizulina.

On the day of second reading, the Russian Wikipedia staged a protest by shutting down its site.

== Internet Registry ==
The Blacklist or Registry is created by amending the Federal Law of July 27, 2006 No. 149-FZ "On Information, Information Technologies and Information Protection." The bill would add a new Article 15: "Uniform registry of domain names and (or) the universal locators to pages of sites on the Internet and network addresses of sites on the Internet that contain information prohibited to spread in the Russian Federation." It would create a registry of domain names with the URLs and network addresses of web pages that contain illegal information. The jurisdiction of the proposed registry would be under a Russian non-profit organization.

The mentioned identifiers of websites would be included into the Registry based on:

- decisions made by the federal executive authorities of the Russian Federation with respect to:
  - Child pornography or solicitation to participate in such;
  - Information about methods of making, using, getting or locating narcotic drugs and psychotropic substances or their precursors (acetone, potassium permanganate, sulfuric acid, hydrochloric acid, acetic acid); or growing plants containing narcotic drugs;
  - Information about methods of suicide and calls for suicide. (suicide is a serious problem in Russia, especially amongst young people)
- a court decision proclaiming some Internet-distributed information as prohibited to be spread in Russia.

=== Hosting providers, site owners, and ISPs ===
When a site is added to the registry, the web hosting provider must within days inform the owner about the situation and the need for removal of content. The site owner must, within days of the receipt of the notification from the hosting provider, remove the page or pages with the offending content. If the site owner fails to do so, the hosting provider is obliged to restrict Internet access to the site.

If the site owner fails to remove the pages as demanded, or if the hosting provider and owner of the site of these fails to restrict access to the site, the site's network address is added to the government's registry.

Internet service providers are required to restrict access to addresses listed in the proposed registry. The legislation ignores the fact that the same IP address may in fact be used by several thousand sites (earlier that year some ISPs have already blocked such an IP address included in the Federal List of Extremist Materials).

Decisions on inclusion in the registry of domain names, links to website pages and site network addresses can only be appealed in court for a limited 3-month period.

== Other changes ==
The bill also made several other amendments. One change to the previously enacted Federal Law of December 29, 2010, No. 436-FZ (On Protecting Children from Information Harmful to Their Health and Development), requires content labelling. Thus, each Internet page (or site) with "harmful" information as listed in article 5 of the law would have been required to mark the site with special symbols or icons for the five categories of visitors: (0–6 years, 6–12 years, 12–16 years, 16–18 years of age, and older than 18 years). Some of the changes define the form of the icons (such as "18+" or "information for persons over 18 years old") and exclude from this marking requirement Internet communications, except for mass media sites ("сетевые издания"), for which user comments are excluded.

Another amendment was proposed to the Code of the Russian Federation on Administrative Violations. It would provide for liability for Internet service providers not using software and hardware to protect children from information harmful to their health and (or) development.

The amendment to the Federal Law of July 7, 2003 No. 126-FZ (On communications) would renew the principle that restriction of access to information through the Internet is regulated by the Federal Law "On Information, Information Technologies and Information Protection."

== Criticism ==
The Presidential Council for the Development of Civil Society Institutions and Human Rights criticized the bill for several reasons:

"The bill is not aimed at combating the causes of illegal content and its distribution on the Internet and will not contribute to the effectiveness of law enforcement and prosecution of criminals, who will be able to migrate resources from illegal content in other domains and IP addresses. At the same time, many bona fide Internet resources with legal content may be affected by the mass blocking, since the system would impose severe restrictions on the basis of subjective criteria and assessments, which will make the Russian jurisdiction extremely unattractive for Internet businesses."

Communications and Mass Media Minister Nikolai Nikiforov tweeted about problems with the bill, according to The Moscow Times.

== See also ==
- Russian Internet blacklist
- Golden Shield Project (Great Chinese Firewall)
- Protecting Children from Internet Pornographers Act of 2011
- Federal Service for Supervision of Communications, Information Technology and Mass Media
- Censorship
- Internet censorship
- Freedom of the press in the Russian Federation
