= Habr =

Russian collaborative blog

- Website type: collaborative blog
- Available in: Russian and English
- Owner: Thematic Media
- Creator: Denis Kryuchkov
- Website: https://habr.com
- Commercial: Yes
- Registration: Required for participation
- Launched: 26 May 2006
- Current status: Online

Habr (since 2018; formerly Habrahabr) (Russian: Хабр, Хабрахабр) is a Russian collaborative blog about IT, computer science and anything related to the Internet, owned by TechMedia. Habrahabr was founded in June 2006, and the English section of Habr was launched in 2019.

Habr is often compared to other technology sites, such as Engadget or Hacker News. The parent company of the site, Habr Blockchain Publishing, developed a group of websites ("Habr Q&A" qna.habr.com, "Habr Career" career.habr.com, "Habr Freelance" freelance.habr.com after they developed habrahabr.ru).

In 2007, Habrahabr received two nominations in the ROTOR contest (Russian: РОТОР), which awards prizes to Russian-language web projects. It was nominated for Discovery of the Year (Russian: Открытие года) and Online Community of the Year (Russian: Интернет-сообщество года) prizes. The website's author, Denis Kryuchkov, was nominated for the Producer of the Year prize (Russian: Продюсер года). In 2009, the website was again nominated for the Online Community of the Year prize.

== Sections ==
=== Blogs ===
The blogs comprise three sections: theme-specific, personal and corporate blogs. Each team blog consists of two sections, both of which contain entries that go by the moniker "habratopiki" (in Russian, "хабратопики") in the Habr environment.

The first section, titled "zahabrennye" (in Russian, "захабренные"), broadcasts entries that have received high approval from users of the website. The second section, called "othabrennye" (in Russian, "отхабренные"), contains habratopiki that have received disapproval by users of the Habr platform.

Topic-specific blogs, which go by the name "Haby" (the plural form of the Russian adaptation of the word "hub"), include sections devoted to programming, IT security, DIY projects, self-care, popular science, open source software, vintage hardware, game development, transportation, programming language-specific threads, and others.

Habr's corporate blogs are authored by companies that include Google, Yandex, Intel, Microsoft, Samsung, and ABBYY, among others.

=== Questions and Answers (Q & A) ===
Since the autumn of 2010, Habr has hosted a questions and answers service, similar to Google's services FAQ. In this section, any user can ask questions about IT-related topics and receive answers from other members of the project.

In 2013, the Q&A section separated from the main portal Habrahbr, and can now be found under a section that is separated from the main Habr portal.

=== People ===
The "people" section provides statistics on registered users (distribution by country and region, the number of registered and active users) and includes user rating, built on the basis of their habrasily. In the present karmagraf - a graph showing the cumulative change indicators karma users.

=== Corporate ===
Rating companies, one way or another connected with the sphere of high technologies. Basis rating - the assessment by users of a particular company.

=== Job board ===
The section devoted to industry job boards. All resumes and vacancies divided by sector ("consulting, outsourcing," "Optimizing sites (SEO)», «Media", etc.). Only users with non-negative karma can post. Summaries from users with negative karma will not appear in the list.

=== Sandbox ===
The Sandbox is designed for posts from read-only users. Posts get there from users who have not yet received access to commenting and creating posts without pre-moderation. After hitting the post in the sandbox it is to see someone from "zahabrennyh," and if he is interested in the post, it will be added to the main section.

== Mechanisms ==
- Karma - The karma is a value assigned to each user. It can only be changed by other users. It is a form of community-driven moderation, since a user's karma level determines their privileges. To publish posts, for example, users must have a positive karma value.
- Rating - The rating is another value assigned to each user. Rating depends on Karma, positive and negative votes of other users for posts and comments. However, the exact algorithm has not been disclosed by the website.
- Voting for topics and comments - This allows users to show their opinion about posts.
