= List of websites blocked in Russia =

This is a list of notable websites that have been blocked or censored by the Russian Federation, including current and past blocks. The Federal Service for Supervision of Communications, Information Technology and Mass Media (Roskomnadzor) has maintained an official mandatory list since 2012. Websites can be blocked for obtaining child pornography, materials advocating drug abuse and drug production, items on the Federal List of Extremist Materials, violations of data retention and about information related to Russo-Ukrainian War.

A number of websites that maintain lists of banned websites are currently blocked in Russia, based on different sources of information.

== List ==
Prior to 2012
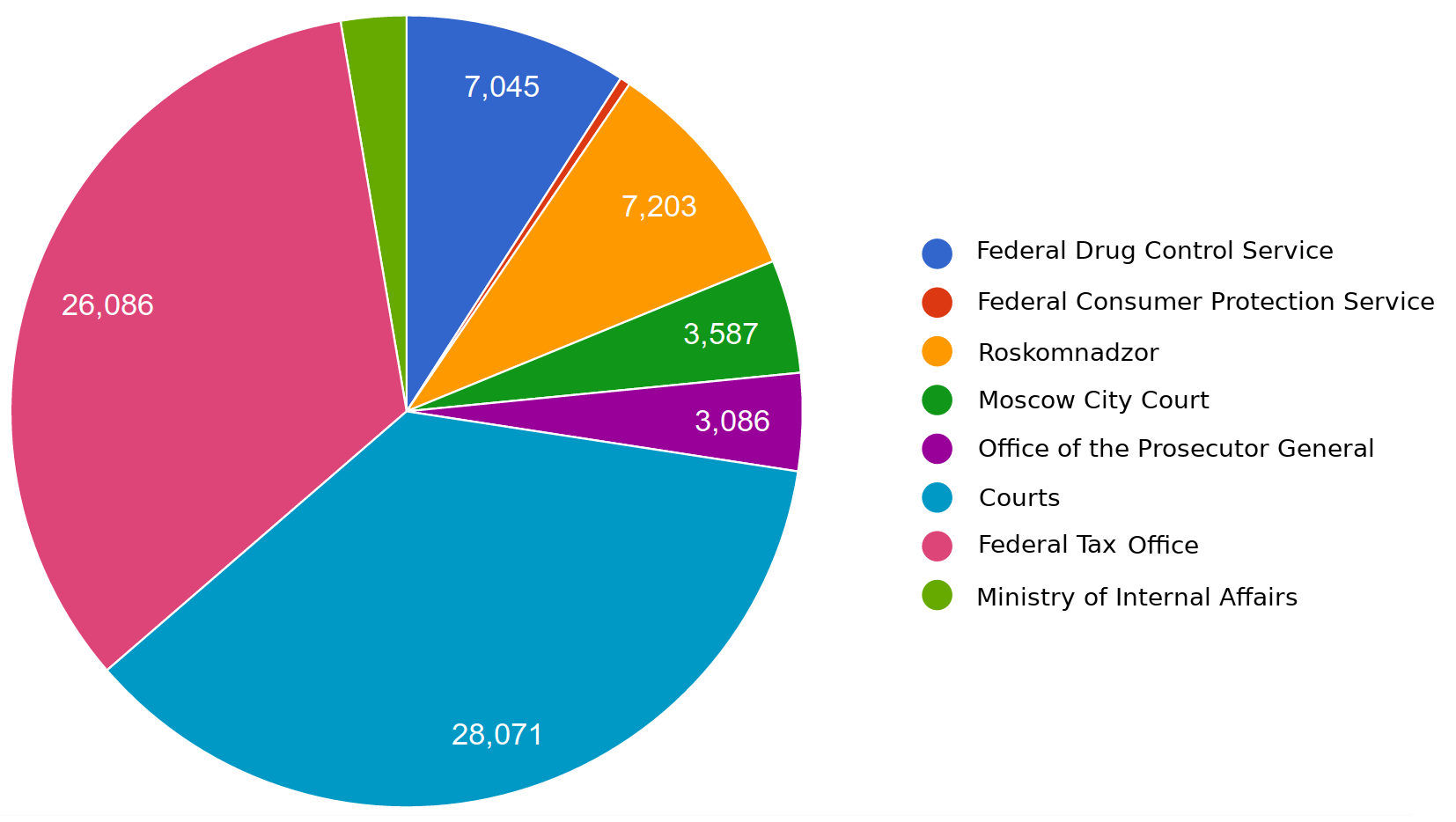
- Blacklist entries as of June 2017 by agencies responsible for the entry
  In 2004, Russia pressured Lithuania, and in 2006 Sweden, into shutting down the Kavkaz Center website, a site that supports creation of a Sharia state in North Caucasus and hosts videos of terrorist attacks on Russian forces in the North Caucasus.
- During the December 2008 demonstrations in Vladivostok, it was reported by the Kontury news website that FSB officers bbc issued a request that moderators of the ru_auto Internet community remove stories about the protests. The major reason, as reported by a moderator of the resource, was that repeating posts containing information about the protests worsened people's attitudes. The moderator in question requested bloggers to publish only unique posts about protest actions.
- In December 2009, Russian-based Internet provider Yota, with over 100,000 subscribers blocked access to some Russian opposition Internet resources for its Moscow-based subscribers for a few days. This occurred after the chief prosecutor of St. Petersburg recommended that the company prevent access to extremist resources. The only Internet resource listed as extremist by the Ministry of Justice of Russia at the time was that of the Caucasian separatists, KavkazCenter.ru. Since the evening of 6 December 2009, Yota allowed access to all previously blocked resources except KavkazCenter.ru.
2012
- On 8 April 2012, it was confirmed by Roskomnadzor that several Russian and English Wikipedia articles had been blacklisted.
- In July 2012, the Russian State Duma passed the Bill 89417-6, which provided a blacklist of Internet sites. The blacklist was officially launched in November 2012, despite criticism by major websites and NGOs.
- The IP address of Lurkmore.to (Lurkomorye) was blocked on 11 November 2012 after a decision of the Federal Drug Control Service of Russia; the owner of the site told journalists he did not receive any communication from Roskomnadzor or the Federal Drug Control Service before the IP address was blacklisted. Lurkmore.to was removed from the blacklist on 13 November 2012 after the website administrators deleted two marijuana-related articles.
- The IP address of the Librusec online library was blacklisted on 11 November 2012. According to a leaked copy of the blacklist, it was blocked for a description of marijuana soup in a Russian translation of The Anarchist Cookbook. The IP address was unblocked on 13 November after The Anarchist Cookbook was removed by Librusec administrators.
2013
- On 31 March 2013, The New York Times reported that Russia was "Selectively Blocking [the] Internet".
- On 5 April 2013, a spokesperson for Roskomnadzor confirmed that the Russian Wikipedia had been blacklisted because of the article, "Cannabis smoking".
2014
- In March 2014, in the midst of the annexation of Crimea by the Russian Federation, the LiveJournal blog of Alexei Navalny, Kasparov.ru and Grani.ru were blocked by the government. These sites, which opposed the Russian government, were blocked for "making calls for unlawful activity and participation in mass events held with breaches of public order."
- On 2 December 2014, the Supreme Court of the Russian Federation banned jw.org.
- In August 2014, a number of websites were blocked as the war in Donbas developed, including the Ukrainian news site Glavnoe.ua, a survey about the separation of the Caucasus from Russia and numerous announcements and commentaries about the "march for Siberia federalisation".
- In 2014, a media blackout was launched against a performance art project called Monstration scheduled for 17 August. Roskomnadzor issued warnings to fourteen media outlets for reporting the announcement. The project was compared to Euromaidan, which led to the 2014 Ukrainian revolution.
- In October 2014 Roskomnadzor blocked the Internet Archive's Wayback Machine site, well known for its Archive.org website. A number of websites listing blocked addresses was also blocked, including such as Zapretno.info.
- In October and December 2014, a popular source code repository, GitHub, was temporarily blocked for hosting a page containing (mostly) satirical suicide instructions, frequently used to troll the Russian censorship system.
- In December 2014 a Facebook page protesting an event against the prosecution of Alexei Navalny was blocked in the Russian Federation. A Roskomnadzor representative stated that the page was blocked because it promoted an "unsanctioned mass event".
- Popular opposition websites encouraging protests against the court rulings in Bolotnaya Square case were blocked for "calling for illegal action"; Dumb Ways to Die, a public transport safety video, was blocked as "suicide propaganda"; websites discussing federalization of Siberia—as "attack on the foundations of the constitution"; an article on a gay activist being fired from job as well as LGBT support communities—as "propaganda of non-traditional sex relations"; publishing Pussy Riot logo—as "insult of the feelings of believers"; criticism of overspending of local governor—"disrespect of the authorities"; publishing a poem in support of Ukraine—"inciting hatred"
2015
- In January 2015, a number of Bitcoin related websites were blocked (including bitcoin.org) because "it contributes to shadow economy". In February, Bitstamp was unblocked.
- In February 2015, Russia blacklisted "Children-404", a website providing Russia's LGBT teens with an outlet to anonymously share their personal experiences with one another, for allegedly violating the country's law against promoting homosexuality.
- An on-line article by Yulia Latynina in Novaya Gazeta was blocked for unspecified "extremism", most likely a suggestion that "Russian culture only became great when it mixed with European".
- After the Russian consumer protection watchdog OZPP published a warning for Russian tourists about possibility of being denied EU visas after visiting Crimea, explaining that from the international law point of view Crimea is an occupied territory, Roskomnadzor blocked the OZPP's website "for threatening territorial integrity of the Russian Federation".
- In June 2015, some ISPs blocked the Internet Archive entirely following an order to censor an archived page for containing "extremist" material. These blocks were a side effect of the site's use of HTTPS possibly being incompatible with how ISPs implement their filters.
- On 21 July 2015 the official website of Jehovah's Witnesses was banned throughout the Russian Federation. Jehovah's Witnesses say that the motion to ban them was originally filed on 7 August 2013 but was overturned after they voluntarily removed certain publications from the version of the site presented to Russian IP addresses. However, on 2 December 2014 the Supreme Court of the Russian Federation overturned the Regional Court, stating that the Witnesses might choose to reinstate the materials they had volunteered to remove.
- On 12 August 2015 the whole of Reddit was blocked in Russia by Roskomnadzor because of a post made by a Reddit user on the site. The post is a guide for growing Psilocybe mushrooms. The block was lifted the next day after Reddit complied with Roskomnadzor's demand of blocking access from users in Russia to the specific post.
- As of August 2015, 4 Wikipedia articles remain blocked in Russia, and more than 25 were blocked for some time. Most of these articles are related to drugs and suicide.
- On 25 January 2016 Rutracker.org, the biggest torrent tracker in Russia and CIS countries, with about 13 million users, was permanently blocked by Roskomnadzor as a result of a decision of the Moscow City Court.
2016
- On 28 January 2016, pages related to the annexation of Crimea by the Russian Federation were blocked on Archive.is when accessed through non-encrypted traffic. HTTPS traffic to the website was blocked entirely.
- On 4 August 2016, a Moscow court ruled that LinkedIn must be blocked in Russia because it stores the user data of Russian citizens outside of the country, in violation of the new data retention law. This ban was upheld on 10 November 2016. and the ban was officially issued by Roskomnadzor on 17 November 2016.
2017
- In January Dailymotion was blocked
- In May LINE was blocked.
- In 2017 an image of Putin as a "gay clown" was added as item 4071 on Russia's Federal List of Extremist Material, as a result of a 2016 legal case against social media activist A. V. Tsvetkov.
2018
- On 13 April 2018, messaging service Telegram was banned by court order for refusing to grant the Federal Security Service (FSB) access to encrypted user communications. The ban has been enforced via the blockage of over 15.8 million IP addresses. IPs associated with Amazon Web Services and Google Cloud Platform are included in the block, due to Telegram's use of these platforms; this measure resulted in collateral damage due to usage of the platforms by other services in the country, including retail, Mastercard SecureCode, Mail.ru's TamTam messaging service, Twitch, and many other unknown websites being blocked for no reason for a month.
2019
- In August 2019 an interview with Massimo Pigliucci, a professor of philosophy at The City College of the City University of New York, about stoicism was blocked for alleged "propaganda of suicide"
2020
- In early 2020 Russia blocked several encrypted email services, including Proton Mail (claiming it had been used to send fake, anonymous bomb threats), Tutanota and Mailfence
2021
- In July 2021, the official website of jailed opposition leader Alexei Navalny was blocked for promoting the Smart Voting strategy prior to the 2021 Russian legislative election.
- In July 2021, the official website of Mondo Media was blocked permanently in Russia due to the ban of the animated Flash series Happy Tree Friends.
- On 3 December 2021, the Russian government became the major stakeholder in the Russian internet company VK MAILRq.L, which runs the country's most popular social network VKontakte, resulting in the then-CEO Boris Dobrodeev to step down.
- In December 2021, the anonymity network Tor was blocked to some users, but not for everyone as of 20 December 2021. This includes the Tor website, public relays, and some bridges. Other bridges, including ones that route connections through Microsoft Azure and WebRTC remained unblocked.
2022
- In March 2022, amid its invasion of Ukraine, Russia began to increasingly block international news outlets such as BBC News Russian, Deutsche Welle, and RFE/RL (including Current Time), and Twitter was "restricted". These actions are intended primarily to curtail the dissemination of information that is inconsistent with the Government of Russia's official positions and statements. Roskomnadzor also ordered that Facebook be blocked for its "discrimination toward Russian media", in retaliation for restricting the accessibility of pages for Russian state media outlets such as Russia Today. Twitter launched an onion service in response.
  - Helsingin Sanomat
  - Ilta-Sanomat
  - Yle News (including the English-language section Yle News, Russian Yle Novosti, Finnish Yle Uutiset, and Swedish Svenska Yle)
  - Website of S.T.A.L.K.E.R. 2: Heart of Chornobyl
2023
- During the rebellion of Yevgeny Prigozhin in June, Roskomnadzor blocked access to Google News, websites of the Patriot Media Group, as well as the public pages of Wagner Group.
- In September, Roskomnadzor blocked access to six articles hosted on Kyrgyz news platform 24.kg and Tajik outlet Payom which criticised the Russian invasion of Ukraine.
2024
- In October 2024, Russia banned Discord, following fines and a request to remove more than one thousand pages and channels. This ban negatively affected their military, who had been using it for front line communications.
2025
- Cloudflare published data showing ISPs have been throttling access to its network—limiting data transfers to 16 KB and severely disrupting internet use—as part of government efforts to control and isolate the country's internet.
- On October 28, MyAnimeList has been permanently blocked in Russia, due to “extremist” LGBTQ+ content.
- On December 3, Russia banned gaming platform Roblox, their reasoning being that it distributes extremist content, "LGBT propaganda", and content exploiting children.
- On December 4, Russia banned social media and instant messaging app Snapchat, their reasoning being that it is being used to organise and carry out terrorist acts within the country, and to recruit perpetrators.
2026
- In February 2026, Roskomnadzor confirmed it was deliberately slowing down Telegram nationwide, citing the company's alleged failure to comply with Russian law and to combat fraud and criminal use of the app. Users had reported problems with the app since January. Telegram founder Pavel Durov said the restrictions were an attempt to force Russians onto the state-backed messenger MAX, which he described as built for surveillance.
- Between 10 and 11 February 2026, Roskomnadzor removed the domains of YouTube and WhatsApp from Russia's National Domain Name System (NSDI), the first documented case of mass DNS record deletion by the regulator. At least 13 other resources, including Facebook, Instagram, Deutsche Welle and Radio Free Europe/Radio Liberty, were also removed. The method proved incomplete, as YouTube remained reachable through alternative DNS servers. YouTube had already been throttled since 2024; see Blocking of YouTube in Russia.
- On 11 February 2026, the Kremlin confirmed that WhatsApp was being blocked by Roskomnadzor, which had restricted the app's calls since August 2025. Authorities urged users to switch to the state-backed MAX app. WhatsApp said Russia was trying to "fully block" the service to push its more than 100 million Russian users toward a state-owned surveillance app.
- From 1 March 2026, new government rules took effect allowing Roskomnadzor to block any website or service and to disconnect the Russian segment of the internet (Runet) from external networks, including over the dissemination of prohibited content.

== List of apps banned ==
- WeChat was banned for a week in 2017.
- JW Library app was banned on 31 March 2021
- Smart Voting app (2021)
- Line (software)
- Foreign messengers in government organizations: Discord, Microsoft Teams, Signal, Skype for Business, Snapchat, Telegram, Threema, Viber, WhatsApp and WeChat are examples. (2023, 2024)

== See also ==
- List of Wikipedia pages banned in Russia
- Media freedom in Russia
- Russian foreign agent law
- Great Firewall
- List of websites blocked in mainland China
