= Gevorkyan v. Moshkov =

Court case regarding Russian copyright law

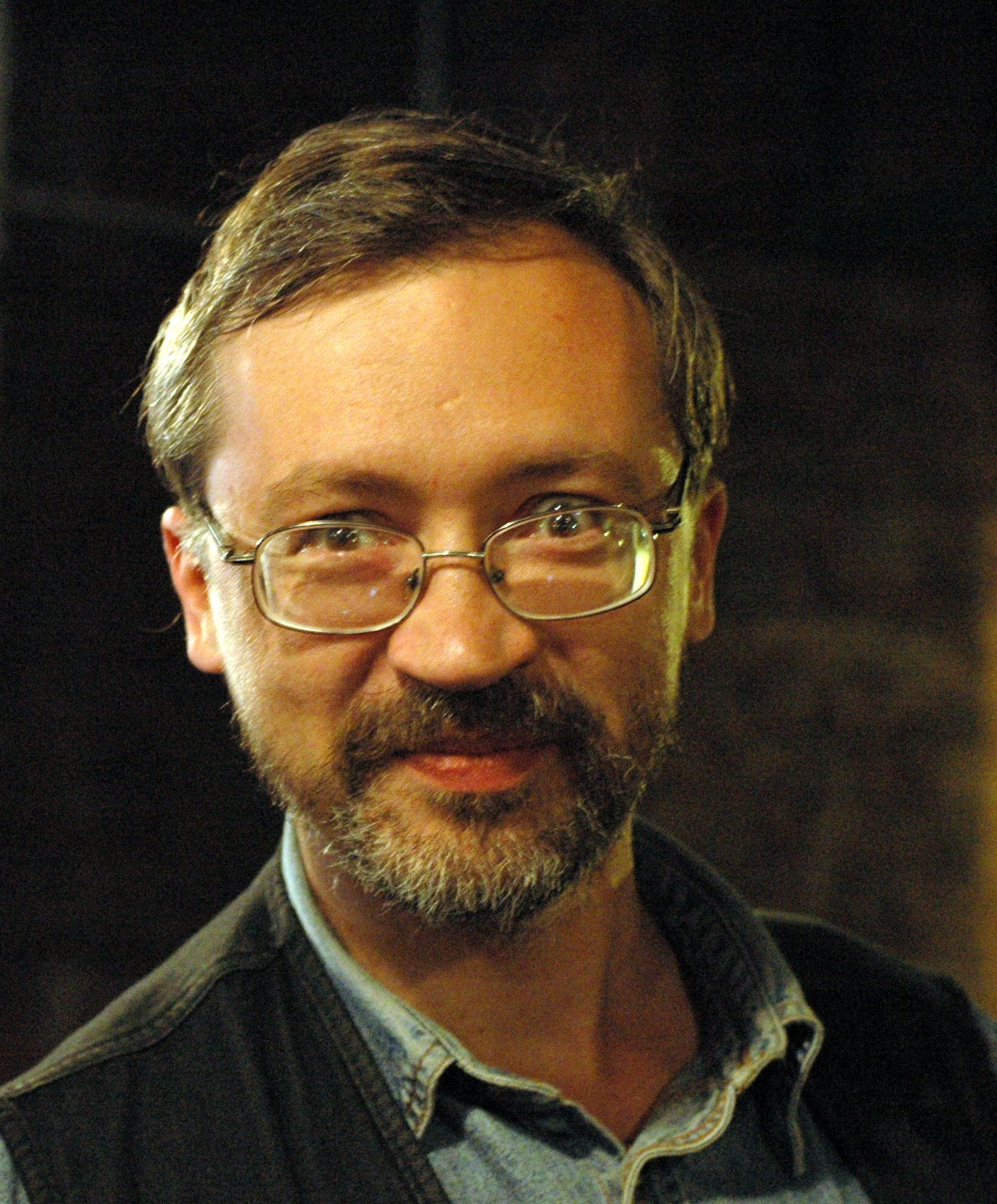
Maksim Moshkow

Gevorkyan v. Moshkov (Russian: Геворкян против Мошкова) was a landmark case that established the precedent for the application of Russian copyright law to online services.

== Background ==
Maksim Moshkow is the owner of the website Lib.ru, also known as the Moshkov library created in 1994. The site is free and supported by advertisements and private donations. The project started as a bulletin board system and kept the bulletin board approach to the copyright matters: the site publishes all notable books uploaded there but removes books by the first request from the authors. The policy was in obvious contradiction with the Russian copyright law, but for more than ten years nobody objected. Indeed, many authors and publishing houses considered placements of their works in the Moshkov library beneficial to the sales of the paper copies of the books.

The Kirill i Mefody company (named after Cyril and Methodius) started in 1995 was the creator of the Large KM Encyclopedia and other multimedia products. In 1998 they created the portal KM Online that gave paying users internet access to their Encyclopedia and their own collection of online books. Unlike Moshkov, Kirill i Mefody library offered the copyright holders up to 20% of its revenue from the downloads of e-books from paying users. In exchange it required the exclusive rights over internet publications. The revenue from the paid downloads was low, since most of the e-books offered by Kirill i Mefody for fee-paying users were freely available on the sites like the Moshkov library.

In 2004 Kirill i Mefody requested Moshkov library to remove access to a long list of books, claiming that they have exclusive internet rights on the books. Among the authors in the list were authors who died in 1920s and 1930s e.g. Nikolay Gumilyov that were usually considered public domain in Russia. The rationale as explained by Kirill i Mefody was that victims of the political repression in the Soviet Union could not enjoy the copyright privileges before their official rehabilitation, thus, their heirs are entitled to offer Kirill i Mefody the exclusive rights in internet even after the legal 50 years after the author's death. Moshkov refused to honor the request and the lawsuit ensued. It was the first Russian lawsuit regarding the rights for internet distribution in Russia. The movements of KM were supported by the National Society for Digital Technologies (Национальное общество по цифровым технологиям (НОЦИТ)), a Russian organization for the promotion copyright in computer-related areas.

== The lawsuit ==
The case was heard in Ostankino Court of Moscow. Originally the KM asked for $500,000 as a compensation for their exclusive rights, but the court did not take the case. The contracts for the exclusive internet rights were considered invalid. The KM took an alternative route and filed applications on behalf of the authors: Alexandra Marinina, Vasili Golovachov, Eduard Gevorkyan and Elena Kasatonova. All of them except the sci-fi writer Eduard Gevorkyan later retracted their signatures claiming that they were not aware of the lawsuits on their behalf.

Eduard Gevorkyan's claimed losses of 1 million roubles (approximately $30,000) due to the Moshkov publication his novel Rules of the game without rule on his internet site. He also sued the Internet provider Nexter, who hosted Moshkov library. The final verdict of the court on 31 May 2005 was that the internet provider is not responsible for the copyright violations of the site and that Moshkov's responsibility is much less – only 3,000 roubles (approximately $100).

Both sides claimed victory. On one side the court recognized some sort of responsibility of free internet services, on the other side the claim amount was vastly reduced from $500,000 to $100 and generated a great deal of negative publicity for the claimant.

== After the lawsuit ==
Part of the Lib.ru library, namely some materials from the site "Samizdat", are included in the Federal List of Extremist Materials under the number 381 by the decision of the Cherepovets Municipal Court of the Vologda Region on 13 April 2009. At that moment part of the providers completely blocked access to the site rather than to specific materials. The site was forced to change the domain to samlib.ru, access to which is also blocked by some Russian providers as of 2015.
