= List of Wikipedia pages banned in Russia =

Within the Russian Federation, a number of Wikipedia articles have been banned. Some of the banned articles have resulted in fines levied against the Wikimedia Foundation. As of July 2023, there have been a total of 7 fines totaling 8.4 million rubles. The Wikimedia Foundation has appealed these fines in court, and has lost. Due to the enabling of HTTPS encryption on all Wikimedia sites, individual Wikipedia articles cannot be blocked by governments without blocking the entire Wikipedia site for that language (for example, see the block of Wikipedia in Turkey).

== Federal list of extremist materials ==
The Federal List of Extremist Materials is compiled by the Russian Ministry of Justice on the basis of court decisions. It includes various materials recognized by the court as extremist. The list is available on the website of the Ministry of Justice.

Record number	Page	Court	Date of court resolution	Date of court decision	Link to court decision	Note
2959	ru:Динамит (presumably)	Novocheboksarsky City Court of the Chuvash Republic – Chuvashia	3 June 2015	31 July 2015	2-1577/2015	The list entry contains an invalid link (http:/ru.wikipedia.org/wiki/%C4%E8%ED%E0%EC%E8%F2)

== Register of information ==
This table shows the Wikipedia pages included in Roskomnadzor's Unified Register of Information Disseminated in Violation of Articles 15.3 and 15.3-1 of Federal Law 149-FZ. Unless otherwise noted, the links in the Article column are to the Russian Wikipedia page, with the equivalent English Wikipedia page linked where available. The links in the URL column are in the form in which they appear in the registry.

=== Wikipedia articles ===
Number	Article	URL	Decision and number	Official reason	Reason for registration	Reason number	Authority	Registration date	Note
1.	Russian invasion of Ukraine		558144-HB	(Note: Informational materials containing unreliable information about the losses of the Armed Forces of the Russian Federation, as well as attacks on the civilian population and civilian infrastructure during the special military operation in the territory of Ukraine.)	17.05.2022	27-31-2022/Треб598-22	Prosecutor General's Office	18 May 2022	English Wikipedia article
2.	List of aircraft losses during the Russo-Ukrainian War		633973-HB	(Note: Informational materials containing unreliable socially significant information about the special military operation being carried out by the Armed Forces of the Russian Federation, its form, methods of conducting combat operations, as well as information about the numerous victims in the ranks of the Armed Forces of the Russian Federation.)	06.10.2022	27-31-2022/Ид14136-22	Prosecutor General's Office	7 October 2022	English Wikipedia article
3.	Rashism		558145-HB	(Note: Informational materials containing unreliable information about the goals and form of the special military operation of the Armed Forces of the Russian Federation in the territory of Ukraine.)	17.05.2022	27-31-2022/Треб598-22	Prosecutor General's Office	18 May 2022	English Wikipedia article
4.	ru:331-й гвардейский парашютно-десантный полк		554389-HB	(Note: Informational materials containing unreliable socially significant information about the special military operation conducted by the Armed Forces of the Russian Federation in the territory of Ukraine, its form, methods of conducting combat operations, as well as information about the numerous victims in the ranks of the Armed Forces of the Russian Federation.)	11.05.2022	27-31-2022/Треб565-22	Prosecutor General's Office	25 August 2022	
5.	ru:64-я отдельная гвардейская мотострелковая бригада		818021-HB	(Note: Informational materials containing unreliable socially significant information discrediting the Armed Forces of the Russian Federation on the conduct of the special military operation in the territory of Ukraine, as well as information about numerous victims among the civilian population of Ukraine and in the ranks of the Armed Forces of the Russian Federation.)	19.06.2023	27-31-2023/Треб375-23	Prosecutor General's Office	23 June 2023	
6.	ru:Авиаудар по больнице в Мариуполе		706111-HB	(Note: Informational materials containing unreliable socially significant information about the special military operation conducted by the Armed Forces of the Russian Federation in the territory of Ukraine, its form, methods of conducting combat operations, as well as information about attacks on civilian infrastructure and numerous casualties among the civilian population of Ukraine.)	25.01.2023	27-31-2023/Ид936-2	Prosecutor General's Office	8 February 2023	
7.	ru:Бригада «Азов»		710573-HB	(Note: Posted text publications substantiating and justifying the activities of the "Azov Regiment" terrorist organization, and the extremist organizations: "Administrative Center of Jehovah's Witnesses in Russia" religious organization and local religious organizations included in its structure, "Right Sector" Ukrainian organization, "National Bolshevik Party" interregional public organization, "Tablighi Jamaat" international religious association, "People's Will Army" interregional public movement, "Russians Ethnopolitical Association" interregional public association, and "National Socialist Society" international public association.)	27.01.2023	27-31-2023/Ид937-23	Prosecutor General's Office	8 February 2023	
8.	ru:Аннексия оккупированных территорий Украины (2022)		655061-HB	(Note: Informational materials containing unreliable socially significant information about the special military operation conducted by the Armed Forces of the Russian Federation in the territory of Ukraine, its form and methods of conducting combat operations.)	10.11.2022	27-31-2022/Ид16140-22	Prosecutor General's Office	12 January 2023	
9.	ru:Армия воли народа		710568-HB		27.01.2023	27-31-2023/Ид937-23	Prosecutor General's Office	8 February 2023	
10.	ru:Бахмут		764097-HB		17.04.2023	27-31-2023/Треб160-23	Prosecutor General's Office	19 April 2023	
11.	ru:Белоруссия и вторжение России на Украину		647515-HB	(Note: Informational materials containing unreliable socially significant information about the special military operation conducted by the Armed Forces of the Russian Federation in the territory of Ukraine, as well as discrediting the use of the Armed Forces of the Russian Federation, which, according to official sources of the Russian Federation, does not correspond to reality.)	26.10.2022	27-31-2022/Ид15180-22	Prosecutor General's Office	2 March 2023	
12.	ru:Битва за Донбасс (с 2022)		734571-HB	(Note: Informational materials containing unreliable socially significant information about the special military operation conducted by the Armed Forces of the Russian Federation in the territory of Ukraine, as well as information about the numerous casualties among the personnel and the loss of materiel of the Armed Forces of the Russian Federation.)	11.03.2023	27-31-2023/Треб76-23	Prosecutor General's Office	13 March 2023	
13.	ru:Битва за Киев (2022)		647544-HB	(Note: Informational materials containing unreliable socially significant information about the special military operation being carried out by the Armed Forces of the Russian Federation, its form, methods of conducting combat operations, as well as information about attacks on civilian infrastructure, numerous casualties among the civilian population of Ukraine and in the ranks of the Armed Forces of the Russian Federation.)	26.10.2022	27-31-2022/Ид15180-22	Prosecutor General's Office	23 December 2022	
14.	ru:Битва за Киев (2022)		512611-HB	(Note: Informational materials containing unreliable socially significant information about the special military operation being carried out by the Armed Forces of the Russian Federation, its form, methods of conducting combat operations, losses of the Armed Forces of the Russian Federation and casualties among the civilian population. Such publications may contribute to the destabilization of the situation, as well as the creation of conditions for mass violations of public order and public security in the territory of the Russian Federation.)	04.04.2022	27-31-2022/Ид4445-22	Prosecutor General's Office	4 April 2022	
15.	ru:Блокада Мариуполя		647541-HB		26.10.2022	27-31-2022/Ид15180-22	Prosecutor General's Office	23 December 2022	
16.	ru:Боевые действия на юге Украины (2022)		734574-HB	(Note: Informational materials containing unreliable socially significant information about the special military operation conducted by the Armed Forces of the Russian Federation in the territory of Ukraine, discrediting the use of the Armed Forces of the Russian Federation, as well as information about the loss of military equipment and materiel by the Armed Forces of the Russian Federation.)	11.03.2023	27-31-2023/Треб76-23	Prosecutor General's Office	13 March 2023	
17.	ru:Бои за Ахтырку		647542-HB		26.10.2022	27-31-2022/Ид15180-22	Prosecutor General's Office	23 December 2022	
18.	ru:Бои за Бучу		647546-HB		26.10.2022	27-31-2022/Ид15180-22	Prosecutor General's Office	23 December 2022	
19.	ru:Бои за Васильков		647547-HB		26.10.2022	27-31-2022/Ид15180-22	Prosecutor General's Office	12 January 2023	
20.	ru:Бои за Волноваху		647539-HB		26.10.2022	27-31-2022/Ид15180-22	Prosecutor General's Office	23 December 2022	
21.	ru:Бои за Ирпень		647545-HB		26.10.2022	27-31-2022/Ид15180-22	Prosecutor General's Office	23 December 2022	
22.	ru:Бои за Изюм		650911-HB	(Note: Informational materials containing unreliable socially significant information about the special military operation conducted by the Armed Forces of the Russian Federation in the territory of Ukraine, its form, methods of conducting combat operations, as well as information about attacks on civilian infrastructure and numerous casualties among the civilian population of Ukraine and in the ranks of the Armed Forces of the Russian Federation.)	01.11.2022	27-31-2022/Ид15637-22	Prosecutor General's Office	20 December 2022	
23.	ru:Бои за Мариуполь (2022)		650905-HB		01.11.2022	27-31-2022/Ид15637-22	Prosecutor General's Office	20 December 2022	
24.	ru:Бои за Николаев (2022)		650917-HB		01.11.2022	27-31-2022/Ид15637-22	Prosecutor General's Office	20 December 2022	
25.	ru:Бои за остров Змеиный		706113-HB	(Note: Informational materials containing unreliable socially significant information about the special military operation conducted by the Armed Forces of the Russian Federation in the territory of Ukraine, its form, methods of conducting combat operations, as well as information about attacks on civilian infrastructure and numerous casualties in the ranks of the Armed Forces of the Russian Federation.)	25.01.2023	27-31-2023/Ид936-23	Prosecutor General's Office	27 January 2023	
26.	ru:Бои за Сумы		647543-HB		26.10.2022	27-31-2022/Ид15180-22	Prosecutor General's Office	23 December 2022	
27.	ru:Бои за Харьков (2022)		543254-HB	(Note: Materials containing unreliable information regarding the conduct of a special military operation in the territory of Ukraine, including information about attacks on civilian infrastructure facilities, numerous casualties among the civilian population of Ukraine and in the ranks of the Armed Forces of the Russian Federation.)	27.04.2022	27-31-2022/Треб530-22	Prosecutor General's Office	25 May 2022	
28.	ru:Бои за Херсон (2022)		650916-HB		01.11.2022	27-31-2022/Ид15637-22	Prosecutor General's Office	20 December 2022	
29.	ru:Бои за Энергодар		650923-HB		01.11.2022	27-31-2022/Ид15637-22	Prosecutor General's Office	20 December 2022	
30.	ru:Бомбардировка Мариупольского театра		749711-HB	(Note: Informational materials containing unreliable socially significant information about the special military operation conducted by the Armed Forces of the Russian Federation in the territory of Ukraine, as well as information about attacks on civilian infrastructure and numerous casualties among the civilian population of Ukraine.)	29.03.2023	27-31-2023/Ид4689-23	Prosecutor General's Office	4 April 2023	
31.	ru:Буча (город)		693370-HB		10.01.2023	27-31-2023/Ид36-23	Prosecutor General's Office	2 March 2023	
32.	ru:Военные преступления в период вторжения России на Украину		512612-HB		04.04.2022	27-31-2022/Ид4445-22	Prosecutor General's Office	4 April 2022	
33.	ru:Вопрос геноцида украинцев в период вторжения России на Украину		607161-HB	(Note: Informational materials containing unreliable socially significant information about the special military operation conducted by the Armed Forces of the Russian Federation in the territory of Ukraine, its form, methods of conducting combat operations, as well as information about attacks on objects.)	11.08.2022	27-31-2022/Ид11168-22	Prosecutor General's Office	25 August 2022	
34.	ru:Временно оккупированные территории Украины		647520-HB	(Note: Informational materials containing unreliable socially significant information regarding the legality of the entry of the Donetsk People's Republic, Luhansk People's Republic, Zaporizhzhia and Kherson oblasts into the Russian Federation, as well as information that, according to official sources of the Russian Federation, does not correspond to reality.)	26.10.2022	27-31-2022/Ид15180-22	Prosecutor General's Office	10 March 2023	
35.	ru:Вторжение России на Украину (2022)		501025-HB	(Note: Material containing unreliable information about the special military operation to protect the Donetsk and Luhansk People's Republics for the demilitarization and denazification of Ukraine. In particular, in the material, the special military operation is called the "Russian invasion of Ukraine", "Russian aggression against Ukraine", the "Russo-Ukrainian war", and "war". The material contains information about numerous casualties among the military personnel of the Russian Federation, as well as the civilian population of Ukraine, including children, which does not correspond to official data published by the Ministry of Defense of the Russian Federation.)	28.03.2022	27-31-2020/Ид3970-22	Prosecutor General's Office	3 March 2023	
36.	ru:Группа Вагнера		655284-HB		10.11.2022	27-31-2022/Ид16140-22	Prosecutor General's Office	23 December 2022	
37.	ru:Депортация украинских детей в Россию		779064-HB	(Note: Informational materials containing unreliable socially significant information about the ongoing special military operation in the territory of Ukraine, as well as aimed at destabilizing the socio-political situation in the Russian Federation.)	04.05.2023	27-31-2023/Треб210-23	Prosecutor General's Office	10 May 2023	
38.	ru:Джамаат Таблиг		710570-HB	(Note: Text publications have been posted that substantiate and justify the activities of an extremist organization: the international religious association Tablighi Jamaat.)	27.01.2023	27-31-2023/Ид937-23	Prosecutor General's Office	8 February 2023	
39.	ru:Донецкая Народная Республика		743945-HB	(Note: Text materials containing unreliable socially significant information regarding the legality of the entry of the Donetsk People's Republic, Luhansk People's Republic, Zaporizhzhia and Luhansk [sic] oblasts into the Russian Federation, as well as other information that does not correspond to reality, creates panic among people, and creates prerequisites for mass violations of public order and public security, in particular: "On September 23–27, 2022, a rigged referendum was held in the Russian-occupied part of the Donetsk and Luhansk oblasts, after which Russia announced the annexation of the Donetsk region (and three more regions of Ukraine). The annexation of the territories was carried out in violation of Russian and international law ...".)	22.03.2023	27-31-2023/Ид4263-23	Prosecutor General's Office	22 March 2023	
40.	ru:Законность вторжения России на Украину (2022)		701104-HB	(Note: Informational materials containing unreliable socially significant information about the special military operation conducted by the Armed Forces of the Russian Federation in the territory of Ukraine, its form, and methods of conducting combat operations.)	20.01.2023	27-31-2023/Ид684-23	Prosecutor General's Office	2 March 2023	
41.	ru:Запорожская АЭС		650925-HB		01.11.2022	27-31-2022/Ид15637-22	Prosecutor General's Office	20 December 2022	
42.	ru:Захват Чернобыльской АЭС		650920-HB		01.11.2022	27-31-2022/Ид15637-22	Prosecutor General's Office	20 December 2022	
43.	ru:Иностранная военная помощь Украине в период войны в Донбассе		647534-HB		26.10.2022	27-31-2022/Ид15180-22	Prosecutor General's Office	2 March 2023	
44.	ru:Иск Украины против России в Международный суд ООН (2022)		647537-HB		26.10.2022	27-31-2022/Ид15180-22	Prosecutor General's Office	20 December 2022	
45.	ru:Использование фосфорных бомб в период вторжения России на Украину		566661-HB	(Note: Materials containing unreliable information about the conduct of the special military operation in the territory of Ukraine, including information about attacks on civilian infrastructure and numerous casualties among the civilian population of Ukraine?)	27.05.2022	27-31-2022/Треб646-22	Prosecutor General's Office	1 June 2022	
46.	ru:История Лисичанска		834340-HB		04.07.2023	27-31-2023/Треб490-23	Prosecutor General's Office	5 July 2023	
47.	ru:Казнь украинского военнопленного через обезглавливание		772274-HB		28.04.2023	27-31-2023/Треб198-23	Prosecutor General's Office	5 May 2023	
48.	ru:Киевское наступление (2022)		647528-HB		26.10.2022	27-31-2022/Ид15180-22	Prosecutor General's Office	23 December 2022	
49.	ru:Контрнаступление в Харьковской области (2022)		650912-HB		01.11.2022	27-31-2022/Ид15637-22	Prosecutor General's Office	23 December 2022	
50.	ru:Контрнаступление в Херсонской области (2022)		734573-HB	(Note: Informational materials containing unreliable socially significant information about the special military operation being carried out by the Armed Forces of the Russian Federation in the territory of Ukraine, as well as information discrediting the use of the Armed Forces of the Russian Federation, including data on the loss of military equipment and materiel by the Armed Forces of the Russian Federation.)	11.03.2023	27-31-2023/Треб76-23	Prosecutor General's Office	13 March 2023	
51.	ru:Контрнаступление на востоке Украины (2022)		682921-HB		23.12.2022	27-31-2022/Ид18704-22	Prosecutor General's Office	3 March 2023	
52.	ru:Кризис на Запорожской АЭС		650919-HB		01.11.2022	27-31-2022/Ид15637-22	Prosecutor General's Office	20 December 2022	
53.	ru:Лисичанск#Российско-украинская война		651838-HB	(Note: Text and photo materials have been posted containing unreliable socially significant information regarding the special military operation carried out by the Armed Forces of the Russian Federation to protect the Donetsk and Luhansk People's Republics, its form, methods of warfare, losses among the civilian population. The information presented contradicts the data of the Russian Ministry of Defense and other official sources of the Russian Federation.)	14.10.2022	27-31-2022/Треб1072-22	Prosecutor General's Office	3 November 2022	
54.	ru:Луганская Народная Республика		743946-HB		22.03.2023	27-31-2023/Ид4263-23	Prosecutor General's Office	22 March 2023	
55.	ru:Мариуполь#Российско-украинская война		651839-HB		14.10.2022	27-31-2022/Треб1072-22	Prosecutor General's Office	3 November 2022	
56.	ru:Мародёрство российской армии во время вторжения на Украину		607175-HB		11.08.2022	27-31-2022/Ид11168-22	Prosecutor General's Office	25 August 2022	
57.	ru:Международная реакция на вторжение России на Украину в 2022 году		647536-HB		26.10.2022	27-31-2022/Ид15180-22	Prosecutor General's Office	20 December 2022	
58.	ru:Мелитополь		650906-HB		01.11.2022	27-31-2022/Ид15637-22	Prosecutor General's Office	12 January 2023	
59.	ru:Миграционный кризис, вызванный вторжением России на Украину		693373-HB		10.01.2023	27-31-2023/Ид36-23	Prosecutor General's Office	10 March 2023	
60.	ru:Мобилизация в России (с 2022)		650913-HB		01.11.2022	27-31-2022/Ид15637-22	Prosecutor General's Office	12 January 2023	
61.	ru:Наступление на северо-востоке Украины (2022)		647529-HB		26.10.2022	27-31-2022/Ид15180-22	Prosecutor General's Office	23 December 2022	
62.	ru:Наступление на юге Украины (2022)		650922-HB		01.11.2022	27-31-2022/Ид15637-22	Prosecutor General's Office	20 December 2022	
63.	ru:Национал-большевистская партия		710569-HB		27.01.2023	27-31-2023/Ид937-23	Prosecutor General's Office	31 January 2023	
64.	ru:Национал-социалистическое общество		710575-HB		27.01.2023	27-31-2023/Ид937-23	Prosecutor General's Office	31 January 2023	
65.	ru:Никола́ев		650918-HB		01.11.2022	27-31-2022/Ид15637-22	Prosecutor General's Office	20 December 2022	
66.	ru:Обстрел больницы в Мариуполе		512614-HB		04.04.2022	27-31-2022/Ид4445-22	Prosecutor General's Office	4 April 2022	
67.	ru:Обстрел вокзала Краматорска		734572-HB		11.03.2023	27-31-2023/Треб76-23	Prosecutor General's Office	13 March 2023	Redirects to Ракетный удар по вокзалу Краматорска (English: Rocket attack on Kramatorsk railway station)
68.	ru:Оценки вторжения России на Украину (2022)		647531-HB		26.10.2022	27-31-2022/Ид15180-22	Prosecutor General's Office	20 December 2022	The page (English: Assessments of the Russian invasion of Ukraine (2022)) was deleted on 26 June 2023
69.	ru:Потери сторон в период вторжения России на Украину		633972-HB		06.10.2022	27-31-2022/Ид14136-22	Prosecutor General's Office	7 October 2022	
70.	ru:Потопление крейсера «Москва»		706112-HB		25.01.2023	27-31-2023/Ид936-23	Prosecutor General's Office	27 January 2023	
71.	ru:Правый сектор		710574-HB		27.01.2023	27-31-2023/Ид937-23	Prosecutor General's Office	31 January 2023	
72.	ru:Преследование свидетелей Иеговы в России		710572-HB		27.01.2023	27-31-2023/Ид937-23	Prosecutor General's Office	31 January 2023	
73.	ru:Продовольственный кризис (2022)#Вторжение России на Украину		693379-HB	(Note: Informational materials containing unreliable socially significant information about the goals and objectives of the special military operation conducted by the Armed Forces of the Russian Federation in the territory of Ukraine, which, according to official sources of the Russian Federation, does not correspond to reality.)	10.01.2023	27-31-2023/Ид36-23	Prosecutor General's Office	10 March 2023	
74.	ru:Протесты против вторжения России на Украину		698324-HB		17.01.2023	27-31-2023/Ид461-23	Prosecutor General's Office	2 March 2023	
75.	ru:Путин, Владимир Владимирович#Отношения с Украиной (2012 — настоящее время)		522408-HB	(Note: Informational materials containing unreliable information about the goals and form of the special military operation of the Armed Forces of the Russian Federation to protect the Donetsk and Luhansk People's Republics.)	07.04.2022	27-31-2022/Ид4709-22	Prosecutor General's Office	12 April 2022	The linked article section (English: Relations with Ukraine (2012 – present)) no longer exists
76.	ru:Путин, Владимир Владимирович#После вторжения на Украину (2022)		522409-HB		07.04.2022	27-31-2022/Ид4709-22	Prosecutor General's Office	12 April 2022	
77.	ru:Разрушение Каховской ГЭС		844259-HB	(Note: Informational materials containing unreliable socially significant information discrediting the Armed Forces of the Russian Federation during a special military operation, as well as unreliable information about the involvement of the Armed Forces of the Russian Federation in the undermining of the Kakhovka hydroelectric power station and about attacks on civilian infrastructure and casualties among the civilian population of Ukraine.)	13.07.2023	27-31-2023/Треб526-23	Prosecutor General's Office	2 August 2023	
78.	ru:Разрушение Мариупольского театра (2022)		512615-HB		04.04.2022	27-31-2022/Ид4445-22	Prosecutor General's Office	4 April 2022	Redirects to Бомбардировка Мариупольского театра (English: Mariupol theatre bombing)
79.	ru:Разрушение Мариупольского театра (2022)		647540-HB		26.10.2022	27-31-2022/Ид15180-22	Prosecutor General's Office	12 January 2023	
80.	ru:Ракетный обстрел Украины 14 января 2023 года		716007-HB		09.02.2023	27-31-2023/Ид1912-23	Prosecutor General's Office	2 March 2023	Redirects to Ракетный удар по жилому дому в Днепре (English: Rocket attack on a residential building in Dnipro)
81.	ru:Ракетный удар по Виннице		749650-HB		29.03.2023	27-31-2023/Ид4689-23	Prosecutor General's Office	4 April 2023	
82.	ru:Ракетный удар по вокзалу Краматорска		789724-HB		16.05.2023	27-31-2023/Треб256-23	Prosecutor General's Office	19 May 2023	
83.	ru:Ракетный удар по торговому центру в Кременчуге		652690-HB		03.11.2022	27-31-2022/Ид15768-22	Prosecutor General's Office	12 January 2023	
84.	ru:Ракетный удар по Часову Яру		716008-HB		09.02.2023	27-31-2023/Ид1912-23	Prosecutor General's Office	2 March 2023	
85.	ru:Рашизм		611734-HB		19.08.2022	27-31-2022/Ид11566-22	Prosecutor General's Office	20 August 2022	
86.	ru:Резня в Буче		512613-HB		04.04.2022	27-31-2022/Ид4445-22	Prosecutor General's Office	4 April 2022	
87.	ru:Референдумы о присоединении к России оккупированных территорий Украины (2022)		650914-HB		01.11.2022	27-31-2022/Ид15637-22	Prosecutor General's Office	20 December 2022	
88.	ru:Росгвардия		667649-HB		01.12.2022	27-31-2022/Ид17441-22	Prosecutor General's Office	23 December 2022	
89.	ru:Российская оккупация Донецкой области		703116-HB	(Note: Informational materials containing unreliable socially significant information regarding the legality of the entry of the Donetsk People's Republic, Luhansk People's Republic, Zaporizhzhia and Kherson oblasts into the Russian Federation.)	20.12.2022	27-31-2022/Треб1278-22	Prosecutor General's Office	2 March 2023	
90.	ru:Российская оккупация Запорожской области		650901-HB		01.11.2022	27-31-2022/Ид15637-22	Prosecutor General's Office	20 December 2022	
91.	ru:Российская оккупация Крыма		703114-HB	(Note: Informational materials containing unreliable socially significant information about the special military operation conducted by the Armed Forces of the Russian Federation in the territory of Ukraine, as well as information about the loss of military equipment and materiel by the Armed Forces of the Russian Federation, which, according to official sources of the Russian Federation, does not correspond to reality.)	20.12.2022	27-31-2022/Треб1278-22	Prosecutor General's Office	3 March 2023	
92.	ru:Российская оккупация Луганской области		703115-HB		20.12.2022	27-31-2022/Треб1278-2	Prosecutor General's Office	2 March 2023	
93.	ru:Российская оккупация Николаевской области		650908-HB		01.11.2022	27-31-2022/Ид15637-22	Prosecutor General's Office	2 March 2023	
94.	ru:Российская оккупация Сумской области		734570-HB	(Note: Informational materials containing unreliable socially significant information about the special military operation conducted by the Armed Forces of the Russian Federation in the territory of Ukraine, which discredits the use of the Armed Forces of the Russian Federation, as well as information about attacks on civilian infrastructure and numerous casualties among the civilian population of Ukraine, which, according to official sources of the Russian Federation, does not correspond to reality.)	11.03.2023	27-31-2023/Треб76-23	Prosecutor General's Office	13 March 2023	
95.	ru:Российская оккупация Харьковской области		650909-HB		01.11.2022	27-31-2022/Ид15637-22	Prosecutor General's Office	20 December 2022	
96.	ru:Российская оккупация Херсонской области		672892-HB		09.12.2022	27-31-2022/Ид17902-22	Prosecutor General's Office	20 December 2022	
97.	ru:Российские удары по украинской энергосистеме		701105-HB		20.01.2023	27-31-2023/Ид684-23	Prosecutor General's Office	2 March 2023	
98.	ru:Российские фильтрационные лагеря на Украине		772350-HB	(Note: Informational materials containing unreliable socially significant information about the special military operation conducted by the Armed Forces of the Russian Federation in the territory of Ukraine, as well as information about numerous victims among the civilian population of Ukraine.)	28.04.2023	27-31-2023/Треб198-23	Prosecutor General's Office	5 May 2023	
99.	ru:Российские фильтрационные лагеря на Украине		625454-HB		22.09.2022	27-31-2022/Ид13266-22	Prosecutor General's Office	20 December 2022	
100.	ru:Российско-украинская война		657852-HB		14.11.2022	27-31-2022/Ид16359-22	Prosecutor General's Office	12 January 2023	
101.	ru:Русская православная церковь и вторжение России на Украину		714544-HB	(Note: Informational materials containing unreliable socially significant information about the special military operation conducted by the Armed Forces of the Russian Federation in the territory of Ukraine, its form, methods of conducting combat operations, as well as information about numerous casualties among the civilian population of Ukraine.)	03.02.2023	27-31-2023/Ид1638-23	Prosecutor General's Office	2 March 2023	The equivalent English Wikipedia page (Russian Orthodox Church and the Russian invasion of Ukraine) does not exist; the relevant section of the Russian Orthodox Church page is linked
102.	ru:Русские (организация)		710576-HB		27.01.2023	27-31-2023/Ид937-23	Prosecutor General's Office	31 January 2023	
103.	ru:Русский военный корабль, иди на хуй		706114-HB		25.01.2023	27-31-2023/Ид936-23	Prosecutor General's Office	27 January 2023	
104.	ru:Свидетели Иеговы в России		710571-HB		27.01.2023	27-31-2023/Ид937-23	Prosecutor General's Office	31 January 2023	The equivalent English Wikipedia page (Jehovah's Witnesses in Russia) does not exist
105.	ru:Сексуальное насилие во время российского вторжения на Украину		777317-HB	(Note: Informational materials containing unreliable socially significant information about the special military operation conducted by the Armed Forces of the Russian Federation in the territory of Ukraine, its form, methods of conducting combat operations, information about numerous casualties among the civilian population of Ukraine, as well as information discrediting the Armed Forces of the Russian Federation.)	03.05.2023	27-31-2023/Ид6785-23	Prosecutor General's Office	10 May 2023	
106.	ru:Специальная военная операция		772348-HB	(Note: Unreliable socially significant information about the conduct of a special military operation in the territory of Ukraine.)	28.04.2023	27-31-2023/Треб198-23	Prosecutor General's Office	5 May 2023	
107.	ru:Х-22		720365-HB		15.02.2023	27-31-2023/Ид2331-23	Prosecutor General's Office	2 March 2023	
108.	ru:Харьков#Российско-украинская война		651837-HB	(Note: Text and photo materials have been posted containing unreliable socially significant information regarding the special military operation carried out by the Armed Forces of the Russian Federation to protect the Donetsk and Luhansk People's Republics, its form, methods of warfare, and losses among the civilian population. The information presented contradicts the data of the Russian Ministry of Defense and other official sources of the Russian Federation.)	14.10.2022	27-31-2022/Треб1072-22	Prosecutor General's Office	3 November 2022	
109.	ru:Херсон#Российская оккупация		707437-HB	(Note: Informational materials containing unreliable socially significant information about the special military operation conducted by the Armed Forces of the Russian Federation in the territory of Ukraine, as well as information about the loss of military equipment and materiel by the Armed Forces of the Russian Federation and about attacks on civilian infrastructure and numerous casualties among the civilian population Ukraine.)	26.01.2023	27-31-2023/Ид985-23	Prosecutor General's Office	2 March 2023	
110.	ru:Херсонская область		714562-HB	(Note: Informational materials containing unreliable socially significant information about the special military operation conducted by the Armed Forces of the Russian Federation in the territory of Ukraine, as well as unreliable socially significant information regarding the legality of the entry of the Donetsk People's Republic, Luhansk People's Republic, Zaporizhzhia and Kherson oblasts into the Russian Federation, as well as information on attacks on civilian infrastructure.)	03.02.2023	27-31-2023/Ид1638-23	Prosecutor General's Office	10 March 2023	
111.	ru:Хронология вторжения России на Украину (2022)		658925-HB		16.11.2022	27-31-2022/Ид16499-22	Prosecutor General's Office	23 December 2022	

=== Files at Wikimedia Commons ===
Number	Page	URL	Decision and number	Official reason	Reason for registration	Reason number	Authority	Registration date	Note
1.	Emblem of the Right Sector Ukrainian Volunteer Corps		749124-HB	(Note: There are materials containing signs of popularization, public justification and propaganda of the Right Sector organization, recognized as extremist by the decision of the Supreme Court of the Russian Federation dated November 17, 2014, No. AKPI14-1292S.)	28.03.2023	27-31-2023/Ид4628-23	Prosecutor General's Office	29 March 2023	
2.	Right Sector activists in Odessa during Euromaidan		749125-HB		28.03.2023	27-31-2023/Ид4628-23	Prosecutor General's Office	29 March 2023	
3.	Composition of the Right Sector movement		749123-HB		28.03.2023	27-31-2023/Ид4628-23	Prosecutor General's Office	29 March 2023	

== Unified register of prohibited sites ==
These tables show Wikipedia pages or Wikimedia Commons files included in the Russian Unified Register of Prohibited Sites. The links in the URL column are in the form in which they appear in the registry.

=== Wikipedia articles ===
Number	Page	URL	Decision and number	Official reason	Date	Reason number	Authority	Registration date	Note
1.	ru:MDMA		89538-РИ	(Note: Contains information on the recipes, methods of development, manufacture and use of narcotic drugs, psychotropic substances and their precursors, places of purchase of such drugs, substances and their precursors, and methods and places of cultivation of narcotic plants.)	17 November 2015	2/1/11-46766	Federal Drug Control Service (FSKN)	23 November 2015	Entered into the register twice
2.	ru:385-я гвардейская артиллерийская бригада		1767510-РИ	(Note: Information about the actual name, place of deployment, organizational structure and the presence of military and military equipment of the military unit has been posted, which is classified as an official secret in the field of defense, recognized as prohibited in the territory of the Russian Federation.)	14 July 2022	2а-382/2022	Totsky District Court, Orenburg Oblast	19 August 2022	
3.	ru:40-й инженерно-сапёрный полк		1945691-РИ	(Note: Information constituting an official secret in the field of defense has been posted, namely, the location of the military unit, its real name, as well as its organizational structure, recognized as prohibited in the territory of the Russian Federation, have been disclosed.)	24 January 2023	2а-1141/2023 (2а-9850/2022)	Kalininsky District Court, Tyumen, Tyumen Oblast	27 January 2023	The equivalent English Wikipedia page (40th Engineer Regiment) does not exist
4.	74th Separate Guards Motor Rifle Brigade		1827687-РИ	(Note: Information has been posted that reveals the location of the military unit, its real name, as well as the organizational structure without indicating the number of personnel by categories and the number of military and military equipment, related to official secrets in the field of defense, recognized as prohibited in the territory of the Russian Federation.)	29 September 2022	2а-1577/2022	Yurginsky City Court, Kemerovo Oblast	11 October 2022	English Wikipedia article
5.	ru:74-я отдельная гвардейская мотострелковая бригада		1767414-РИ		22 June 2022	2а-1170/2022	Yurginsky City Court, Kemerovo Oblast	19 August 2022	
6.	ru:Амфетамин		1601187-РИ		31 January 2022	2018-02-06-2694	Ministry of Internal Affairs (MVD)	9 March 2022	
7.	ru:Амфетамины		89535-РИ		17 November 2015	2/1/11-46762	FSKN	23 November 2015	
8.	ru:Кокаин#Появление и популяризация кокаина		89536-РИ		17 November 2015	2/1/11-46761	FSKN	23 November 2015	The linked section (English: Emergence and popularity of cocaine) does not exist
9.	ru:Коктейль Молотова		1579262-РИ	(Note: Contains information whose distribution in the Russian Federation is prohibited by a court decision.)	18 July 2017	2-509/2017	Dobrinsky District Court, Lipetsk Oblast	15 February 2022	
10.	ru:Метамфетамин		89537-РИ		17 November 2015	2/1/11-46763	FSKN	23 November 2015	
11.	ru:Меткатинон		1605946-РИ		27 January 2022	2017-05-29-54	MVD	15 March 2022	
12.	ru:Мефедрон		1587430-РИ		29 March 2021	2020-10-05-1014	MVD	22 February 2022	
13.	ru:Ненасильственное сопротивление гражданского населения Украины в ходе вторжения России		1760997-РИ	(Note: Information has been posted discrediting the use of the Armed Forces of the Russian Federation in order to protect the interests of the Russian Federation and its citizens, and maintain international peace and security, recognized as prohibited in the territory of the Russian Federation.)	26 April 2022	2а-386/2022	Sretensky District Court, Zabaykalsky Krai	12 August 2022	
14.	ru:Нитрид трииода		1563566-РИ	(Note: Information about the manufacture of the explosive "Nitrogen triiodide" has been posted, including from publicly available materials.)	19 April 2017	2а-352/2017	Uvarovsky District Court, Tambov Oblast	1 February 2022	
15.	ru:Оценки вторжения России на Украину (2022)		1760608-РИ		26 April 2022	2а-386/2022	Sretensky District Court, Zabaykalsky Krai	12 August 2022	The page (English: Assessments of the Russian invasion of Ukraine (2022)) was deleted on 26 June 2023
16.	ru:Последствия употребления MDMA и экстази		1592186-РИ		27 January 2022	2018-12-14-1103	MVD	1 March 2022	The equivalent English Wikipedia page (Consequences of using MDMA and ecstasy) does not exist
17.	ru:Р-36М		1337319-РИ	(Note: Information has been posted that constitutes a state secret recognized as prohibited in the territory of the Russian Federation.)	15 June 2021	2а-6480/2021	Odintsovo City Court, Moscow Oblast	15 June 2021	The equivalent English Wikipedia page (R-36M) does not exist; the relevant section of the R-36 (missile) page is linked
18.	ru:Самоубийство		13131-РИ	(Note: Variants of suicide are listed, with some of them containing detailed information about the specific practice of this type of suicide. The materials contain detailed information about the methods of suicide.)	18 September 2013	2512	Rospotrebnadzor	20 September 2013	(Note: The article (English: suicide) is included in the List of articles every Wikipedia should have. The article (including the synonym ru:Суицид, which redirects to it) was entered into the register 3 times.)
19.	ru:Способы самоубийства		20280-РИ	(Note: Contains information about ways to commit suicide and calls for committing suicide.)	11 February 2014	3735	Rospotrebnadzor	12 February 2014	
20.	ru:Центральный военный округ (Россия)		2005915-РИ	(Note: Information has been posted containing information constituting an official secret in the field of defense, revealing the location of associations, formations, military units, organizations and military facilities of the Central Military District, indicating their real names, contained in materials with the heading "Central Military District", recognized as prohibited in the territory of the Russian Federation.)	1 February 2023	2а-1477/2023	Oktyabrsky District Court, Yekaterinburg, Sverdlovsk Oblast	22 March 2023	

=== Files at Wikimedia Commons ===
Number	File	URL	Decision and number	Official Reason	Reason for registration	Official number	Authority	Registration date	Note
1.	A group of children rides between the middle and head cars of a pair of electric trains on the Kryukovo–Skhodnya–Khimki route of the October Railway, Moscow Oblast, Russia		2085761-РИ	(Note: Information about "[train] hopping" has been posted, i.e. in violation of the rules of travel on railway transport, inciting to commit offenses, is misleading about the possibility and admissibility of "hopping", access to which is limited on the basis of the ruling of the Kartalinsky City Court of the Chelyabinsk Region dated May 11, 2023 on the application of preliminary protection measures.)	11.05.2023	б/н	Kartalinsky City Court, Chelyabinsk Oblast	25 May 2023	
2.	Person riding on the front of an ES2G "Lastochka" electric train on the Skhodnya–Khimki route, October Railway, Moscow Oblast, Russia		2085782-РИ		11.05.2023	б/н	Kartalinsky City Court, Chelyabinsk Oblast	25 May 2023	
3.	Person riding on the front of an ES2G "Lastochka" electric train on the Skhodnya–Khimki route, October Railway, Moscow Oblast, Russia		2146639	(Note: Information about "[train] hopping" has been posted, i.e. in violation of the rules of travel on railway transport, misleading about the possibility and admissibility of "hopping", recognized as prohibited in the territory of the Russian Federation.)	31.05.2023	2а-634/2023	Kartalinsky City Court, Chelyabinsk Oblast	13 July 2023	
4.	A group of people riding on the platform cars and dump cars of a freight train on the Kyiv–Fastiv route in Ukraine		2024883-РИ	(Note: Namely, at the link https://ru.wiktionary.org/wiki/File:Freight_train_hopping_on_flatcar_and_dumpcar,_Kiev_-_Fastiv.webm [shows] there is a video demonstrating passing between electric vehicles in an unsuitable place for this. This publication promotes the "[train] hopping" movement, which involves minors in a dangerous activity that poses a threat to their health and life.)	28.03.2023	2023-03-14-2522-ВН	Rosmolodezh	5 April 2023	
5.	A group of people riding on the platform cars and dump cars of a freight train on the Kyiv–Fastiv route in Ukraine		2115324-РИ	(Note: Namely, at the link https://commons.m.wikimedia.org/wiki/File:Freight_train_hopping_on_flatcar_and_dumpcar,_Kiev_-_Fastiv.webm there is a video in which young people, including the camera operator, are on an electric transport in a place unsuitable for travel. This publication promotes the "[train] hopping" movement, which involves minors in a dangerous activity that poses a threat to their health and life.)	14.06.2023	2023-06-07-5051-ВН	Rosmolodezh	19 June 2023	
6.	A trip on an October Railway freight train on a gondola car carrying woodchips and a timber car from Saint Petersburg to Vyborg, Finland		1955632-РИ	(Note: Namely, at the link https://upload.wikimedia.org/wikipedia/commons/6/6a/Freight_train_hopping_on_gondola_car_and_forest_car_in_Saint_Petersburg.webm there is a video in which young people, including the camera operator, are on an electric transport in a place unsuitable for travel. This publication promotes the "[train] hopping" movement, which involves minors in a dangerous activity that poses a threat to their health and life.)	01.02.2023	2023-02-01-925-ВН	Rosmolodezh	3 February 2023	
7.	Schematic of a Molotov cocktail		1785027-РИ	(Note: Information has been posted containing instructions for the manufacture of explosive devices – "Molotov cocktail" liquid incendiary grenades, recognized as prohibited in the territory of the Russian Federation.)	29.07.2022	2а-1-768/2022	Balashovsky District Court, Saratov Oblast	6 September 2022	
8.	View from a tank wagon of a freight train, from Sapernaya to Pella, Leningrad Oblast, Russia		1959489-РИ	(Note: Namely, at the link https://upload.wikimedia.org/wikipedia/commons/8/8b/Tank_railway_wagon_-_view_from_train%2C_Sapernaya_-_Pella.webm there is a video recording in which the camera operator is on an electric transport in a place unsuitable for travel. This publication promotes the "[train] hopping" movement, which involves minors in a dangerous activity that poses a threat to their health and life.)	02.02.2023	2023-02-01-996-ВН	Rosmolodezh	13 March 2023	
9.	Wiki-sixtynine-male.jpg		2030313-РИ	(Note: Namely, at the link https://upload.wikimedia.org/wikipedia/commons/thumb/8/8b/Wiki-sixtynine-male.jpg/200px-Wikisixtynine-male.jpg there is an image showing non-traditional sexual relations. The publication contains information that encourages non-traditional sexual relations, demonstrates non-traditional sexual relations, and may also contribute to the formation of a positive attitude towards non-traditional sexual relations among minors.)	04.04.2023	2023-03-27-875-ВН	Rosmolodezh	10 April 2023	
10.	The Jews, Their Origins and the Causes of Their Influence in Europe, a chapter of the antisemitic book The Foundations of the Nineteenth Century, 1907		1748106-РИ	(Note: The book "Jews, Their Origins and the Causes of [Their] Influence in Europe" by Chamberlain Houston Stewart, recognized as extremist, has been posted.)	19.12.2018	2а-5858/2018	Sovietsky District Court,Bryansk, Bryansk Oblast	22 February 2023	Re-entry into the register

==== Files previously on the registry ====
Number	File	URL	Decision and number	Official reason	Reason for registration	Reason number	Authority	Registration date	Removal from the registry	Note
1.	2ac17a41e4efe6361266a16216278531--my-life-cat.jpg		1817212-РИ	(Note: When you click on the link https://upload.wikimedia.org/wikipedia/commons/thumb/8/89/2ac17a41e4efe6361266a16216278531--my-life-cat.jpg/67px-2ac17a41e4efe6361266a16216278531--my-life-cat.jpg, the website page opens "upload.wikimedia.org" with a picture of a limb with numerous cuts, which contains information about a method of committing suicide.)	30.09.2022	146746	Rospotrebnadzor	3 October 2022	5 October 2022	Removed on 9 October 2022 for meeting the criteria for speedy deletion.
3.	Anime Style Shower Scene002.png		1630353-РИ	(Note: The information found at the pointer to the Internet page https://commons.wikimedia.org/wiki/File:Anime_Style_Shower_Scene002.png contains pornographic images of minors, as the simulated sexually explicit actions of a child are depicted in a vulgar-naturalistic form.)	07.04.2022	1642540	Roskomnadzor	7 April 2022	28 July 2022	Removed on 7 July 2022 for violating the aims and objectives of Wikimedia Commons
4.	Erotic asphyxiation.jpg		1612559-РИ	(Note: A photo of a girl with a suicide rope noose around her neck, attached to a door frame, which is a demonstration of one of the methods for committing suicide.)	28.01.2022	136489	Rospotrebnadzor	22 March 2022	13 December 2022	Removed on 30 June 2022 for copyright infringement
5.	HentaiYureeGame.png		1630202-РИ	(Note: The information found under the index of the Internet page https://commons.wikimedia.org/wiki/File:HentaiYureeGame.png contains pornographic images of minors, as the simulated sexually explicit actions of a child are depicted in a vulgar-naturalistic form.)	07.04.2022	1642539	Roskomnadzor	7 April 2022	21 September 2022	Removed on 12 September 2022 for violating the aims and objectives of Wikimedia Commons
6.	KodomoCensored.png		1630960-РИ	(Note: The information found under the index of the Internet page https://commons.wikimedia.org/wiki/File:KodomoNiabot.png contains pornographic images of minors, as the simulated sexually explicit actions of a child are depicted in a vulgar-naturalistic form.)	07.04.2022	1642545	Roskomnadzor	7 April 2022	28 July 2022	Removed on 7 July 2022 for violating the aims and objectives of Wikimedia Commons
7.	KodomoNiabot.png		1631114-РИ	(Note: The information found under the index of the Internet page https://commons.wikimedia.org/wiki/File:KodomoCensored.png contains pornographic images of minors, as the simulated sexually explicit actions of a child are depicted in a vulgar-naturalistic form.)	07.04.2022	1642544	Roskomnadzor	7 April 2022	28 July 2022	Removed on 7 July 2022 for violating the aims and objectives of Wikimedia Commons
8.	KodomoNoSaori.png		1630502-РИ	(Note: The information found under the index of the Internet page https://commons.wikimedia.org/wiki/File:KodomoNoSaori.png contains pornographic images of minors, as the simulated sexually explicit actions of a child are depicted in a vulgar-naturalistic form.)	07.04.2022	1642541	Roskomnadzor	7 April 2022	28 July 2022	Removed on 7 July 2022 for violating the aims and objectives of Wikimedia Commons
9.	Kogalcensored.png		1630355-РИ	(Note: The information found under the index of the Internet page https://commons.wikimedia.org/wiki/File:Kogalcensored.png contains pornographic images of minors, as the simulated sexually explicit actions of children are depicted in a vulgar-naturalistic form.)	07.04.2022	1642548	Roskomnadzor	7 April 2022	28 July 2022	Removed on 7 July 2022 for violating the aims and objectives of Wikimedia Commons
10.	KogalClassroom003.png		1630049-РИ	(Note: The information found under the index of the Internet page https://commons.wikimedia.org/wiki/File:KogalClassroom003.png contains pornographic images of minors, as the simulated sexually explicit actions of children are depicted in a vulgar-naturalistic form.)	07.04.2022	1642546	Roskomnadzor	7 April 2022	28 July 2022	Removed on 7 July 2022 for violating the aims and objectives of Wikimedia Commons
11.	KogalClassroom004.png		1630504-РИ	(Note: The information found under the index of the Internet page https://commons.wikimedia.org/wiki/File:KogalClassroom004.png contains pornographic images of minors, as the simulated sexually explicit actions of children are depicted in a vulgar-naturalistic form.)	07.04.2022	1642549	Roskomnadzor	7 April 2022	28 July 2022	Removed on 7 July 2022 for violating the aims and objectives of Wikimedia Commons
12.	Kogaru1.jpg		1630654-РИ	(Note: The information found under the index of the Internet page https://commons.wikimedia.org/wiki/File:Kogaru1.jpg contains pornographic images of minors, as the simulated sexually explicit actions of a child are depicted in a vulgar-naturalistic form.)	07.04.2022	1642542	Roskomnadzor	7 April 2022	28 July 2022	Removed on 7 July 2022 for violating the aims and objectives of Wikimedia Commons
13.	YuuseiShonenPanel.jpg		1630204-РИ	(Note: The information found under the index of the Internet page https://commons.wikimedia.org/wiki/File:YuuseiShonenPanel.jpg contains pornographic images of minors, as the simulated sexually explicit actions of a child are depicted in a vulgar-naturalistic form.)	07.04.2022	1642547	Roskomnadzor	7 April 2022	28 July 2022	Removed on 7 July 2022 for violating the aims and objectives of Wikimedia Commons
14.	Евреи, их происхождение и причины их влияния в Европе 1907.pdf		1748106-РИ		19.12.2018	2а-5858/2018	Sovietsky District Court, Bryansk, Bryansk Oblast	2 August 2022	4 August 2022	On 2 August 2022 the file was deleted by the uploader, and on 8 August 2022 it was reuploaded

=== Notes on Wikinews ===
Number	Page	URL	Decision and number	Official reason	Reason for registration	Reason number	Authority	Registration date
1.	"Kill the cop" Miroslav Nemirov blocked in Russia (in Russian)		1832659-РИ	(Note: The text of the song "Psyche – Kill the cop", which is recognized as extremist material, has been posted.)	13.09.2010	2-2285/10	Dorogomilovo District Court, Moscow	26 January 2023

== Decisions of Russian courts ==
Below are the current decisions of the Russian courts, in which certain Wikipedia articles are recognized as information prohibited for distribution throughout the Russian Federation. At the same time, some of these articles have not yet been included in the Unified Register of Prohibited Sites. The links in the URL column are in the form in which they appear in the judgement.

Number	Page	URL	Case number and reference	Court	Judge	Plaintiff	Respondent or interested party	Decision date	Note
1.	ru:Аммонал		2-5552/2017	Frunzensky District Court, Saint Petersburg	A. V. Malyshev	Frunzensky District Prosecutor's Office	Roskomnadzor	21 September 2017	
2.	ru:Дымный порох		2а-2615/2021	Moscovsky City Court of Tver, Tver Oblast	I. V. Boyev	Moskovsky City District Prosecutor	Tver Oblast Roskomnadzor Office	11 November 2021	
3.	ru:Коктейль Молотова		2-509/2017	Dobrinsky District Court, Lipetsk Oblast	S. A. Grishchenko	Dobrinsky District Prosecutor	Roskomnadzor	18 July 2017	
4.	ru:Коктейль Молотова		2а-822/2017	Monchegorsk City Court, Murmansk Oblast	V. B. Korayeva	Monchegorsk City Prosecutor	Roskomnadzor	4 December 2017	
5.	ru:Напалм		2а-1038/2017	Monchegorsk City Court, Murmansk Oblast	V. B. Korayeva	Monchegorsk City Prosecutor	Roskomnadzor	12 February 2018	
6.	ru:Нитрид трииода		2а-352/2017	Uvarovsky District Court, Tambov Oblast	G. V. Kuleshova	Uvarovsky Interdistrict Prosecutor of Tambov Oblast	Tambov Oblast Roskomnadzor Office	19 April 2017	
7.	ru:Пероксид ацетона		2а-351/2017	Uvarovsky District Court, Tambov Oblast	G. V. Kuleshova	Uvarovsky Interdistrict Prosecutor of Tambov Oblast	Tambov Oblast Roskomnadzor Office	19 April 2017	
8.	ru:Полное руководство по самоубийству		2-195/2017	Arzgirsky District Court, Stavropol Krai	V. V. Chernysheva	Arzgirsky District Prosecutor	Roskomnadzor	7 July 2017	
9.	ru:Порох		2а-350/2017	Uvarovsky District Court, Tambov Oblast	G. V. Kuleshova	Uvarovsky Interdistrict Prosecutor of Tambov Oblast	Tambov Oblast Roskomnadzor Office	19 April 2017	
10.	ru:Р-36М		2а-6480/2021	Odintsovo City Court, Moscow Oblast	I. G. Zhuravleva	60 of the military garrison prosecutor's office (in the interest of the Russian Federation)	Central Federal District Roskomnadzor Office	15 June 2021	The equivalent English Wikipedia page (R-36M) does not exist; the relevant section of the R-36 (missile) page is linked
11.	ru:Способы самоубийства		2А-1977/2017	Kurgan City Court, Kurgan Oblast	E. M. Shalyutin	Belozersky District Prosecutor	Kurgan Oblast Roskomnadzor Office	16 January 2017	
12.	ru:Способы самоубийства		2-195/2017	Arzgirsky District Court, Stavropol Krai	V. V. Chernysheva	Arzgirsky District Prosecutor	Roskomnadzor	7 July 2017	
13.	ru:Способы самоубийства	Ссылка удалена из решения суда	2-2710/2017	Leninsky District Court, Cheboksary	V. V. Yevstafiev	Leninsky District Deputy Prosecutor	Chuvashia Roskomnadzor Office	9 August 2017	
14.	ru:Способы самоубийства		2-239/2018	Leninsky District Court of Grozny, Chechen Republic	S. A. Pisarenko	Prosecutor of Grozny, Chechen Republic	Vainakh Telecom; Elektrosvyaz Federal State Unitary Enterprise in Chechnya; The Caucasus branch of Megafon, Chechnya subdivision; VimpelCom, Grozny branch; Mobile TeleSystems, Chechnya branch; Chechen Cellular Communications	16 February 2018	
15.	ru:Способы самоубийства		2-1253/2018	Oktyabrsky District Court of Saratov	A. Yu. Tenkayeva	Oktyabrsky District Deputy Prosecutor	Saratov Oblast Roskomnadzor Office	10 April 2018	

== See also ==
- Ruwiki (Wikipedia fork)
- List of websites blocked in Russia
