= Russian Communist Party (International) =

Russian Communist Party (International) Российская коммунистическая партия (интернационалистов)
- Abbreviation: RCP(I)
- Leader: Collective leadership
- Founded: June 2024
- Ideology: Communism; Marxism–Leninism; Proletarian internationalism Anti-imperialism
- Political position: Far-left

Party flag

Website
- rkpi.info

Russian Communist Party (International) (RCP(I); Russian: Российская коммунистическая партия (интернационалистов); РКП(и)) is a Russian unregistered political organization that adheres to Marxist positions and advocates the construction of socialism and communism. It was created after a split in the Russian communist movement caused by the armed conflict between Russia and Ukraine. Formed in June 2024 by former members of the Russian Communist Workers' Party (RCWP), the United Communist Party (UCP) and a number of other non-systemic communist associations, who took an internationalist position in assessing the conflict and condemned the pro-war position of part of the Russian left as social-chauvinistic.

== History ==
The communist movement in post-Soviet Russia has never been a unified whole. Like similar ideological and political movements in other countries, it is characterized by various tendencies, fragmentation into a number of organized and informal communities with polar points of view in terms of ideology, strategy and tactics, agitation and propaganda, assessment of political and socio-economic realities, assessment of the Soviet experience and the experience of people's democracies, and attitudes toward certain ideological traditions (Stalinism, Trotskyism, Maoism, Hoxhaism, etc.).

Almost all Russian communist groups that adhere to Marxist positions tend to reject the CPRF as a revolutionary and genuine communist political force, although views on possible forms of interaction with it vary.

The start of war military actions in 2022 caused fundamental disagreements among Russian communists and revealed contradictions in many associations, including the RCWP and the UCP. A number of parties and organizations, including the CPRF, and individual left-wing publicists supported the "Special Military Operation," arguing their position by the need to "fight Western imperialism and Ukrainian fascism."

The others, while not denying the strengthening of the ultra-right reaction in Ukraine and its dependence on Western countries, assessed the actions of the Russian leadership as a manifestation of its own imperialist ambitions, hostile to the interests of the working class of Russia and Ukraine, noting at the same time a significant strengthening of reactionary tendencies within Russia.

The second group has adopted the self-designation "internationalists", denoting a commitment to the principles of proletarian internationalism, which places the class solidarity of the proletariat above interethnic differences. Internationalist communists call their opponents "social chauvinists" or, denying them any affiliation with the labor movement, simply "chauvinists". The latter, in turn, use the pejorative term "no-warists" in relation to the internationalists.

A similar split has occurred in the Ukrainian left: the Workers’ Front of Ukraine, a Marxist organization, considers the Russian-Ukrainian confrontation to be imperialist on both sides, while a number of anarchist, social democratic, and Trotskyist groups (the Ukrainian Socialist League, Social Movement, Revolutionary Action) supported Ukraine's participation in the war, that is, in Marxist terminology, took a social-chauvinist position, as did a certain part of the Ukrainian left-wing political emigration that supported Russia's actions (for example, Borotba). Communist parties in other countries were also divided in their assessment of the Russian-Ukrainian conflict.

The "battle for minds" between internationalists and social chauvinists is taking on particular significance amid the growing popularity of socialist ideas in Russian society. In addition, unlike the liberal opposition, the communists retain their organizational autonomy on Russian territory and, despite tightening censorship, broadcast various points of view in the public sphere. The authorities are taking repressive measures, including a number of high-profile criminal cases since 2022.

On September 28, 2023, a group of international communists published a statement, "For the Revolutionary Renewal of the Communist Movement in Russia," which sharply criticized the policies of the Russian government and those on the left who had supported them to any degree. This statement announced the intention to create a new communist party that would be free of pro-war activists. The document was drafted by former members of the RCWP and UCP who left these parties due to the pro-war stance of their leadership.

On June 22–23, 2024, the founding congress of the Russian Communist Party (International) was held in Podmoskovye. It adopted the party charter and program, elected the Central Committee and the Central Control and Auditing Commission. On June 28, the creation of the RCP(I) was announced publicly. The RCP(I) united the Red Turn group, the Organization of Perm Communists, the Open Communist Platform of Internationalists, the Communist Initiative and a group of former members of the Moscow organization of the RCWP; representatives of these groups became members of the RCP(I) from the moment of its founding. All persons joining the RCP(I) later undergo a candidate period of probation; the party charter also provides for the status of "supporter".

The party's program contains a number of communist and general democratic provisions, calls for a break with opportunists and revisionists, and declares a desire to create a new communist international to fight for world revolution.

== Activity ==
The RCP(I) does not recognize the People's Republic of China as a socialist state, assessing its policies as imperialist, while a number of communist parties in various countries take a pro-Chinese position. The latter are typically characterized by their support for Russian foreign policy as anti-fascist. At the same time, a significant part of the global communist movement, including the Communist Party of Greece, considers the People's Republic of China and the Russian Federation to be imperialist forces.

Currently, the RCP(I) is engaged in agitation and propaganda work, criticizing the domestic and foreign policies of the Russian leadership from a Marxist perspective and advocating for a fundamental restructuring of society based on the principles of the dictatorship of the proletariat and internationalism; the ultimate goal is the building communism. The party also holds public events, including rallies and solo pickets.

On October 6, 2024, by the efforts of the RCP(I), the only rally in Russia against the blocking of YouTube took place in Novosibirsk.

On September 7, 2025, rallies organized by the RCP(I) took place in Novosibirsk, Omsk, and Petropavlovsk-Kamchatsky for freedom of speech and information; in particular, against the blocking of calls in instant messengers and the forced imposition of the Max service. A similar rally by the RCP(I) on September 13 in Moscow was banned. Earlier, on August 31, the "Organization of Voronezh Marxists" held a rally with similar demands in Voronezh.
