= Debri-DV =

- Native name: Дебри-ДВ
- Romanized name: Debri-DV
- Available in: 1 languages
- List of languages ru
- Country of origin: Russia
- Founders: Konstantin Pronyakin, Pavel Bakanov
- Website: debri-dv.com
- Registration: Certificate of registration СМИ ЭЛ № ФС77-45537; June 16, 2011

Debri-DV (Russian: Дебри-ДВ) is a Russian electronic periodical specializing in analytical information on the Far Eastern Federal District. It was registered as a media outlet in 2011 and has been operating as an electronic archive since 2006. The editorial office is located in Khabarovsk.

Debri-DV positions itself as an independent socio-political publication. Certificate of mass media registration: EL No. FS77-45537 issued by the Federal Service for Supervision of Communications, Information Technology and Mass Media on June 16, 2011.

Debri-DV entered the top 15 most-cited media outlets of Khabarovsk Krai in the media rating from Medialogiya in 2012.

The site contains 277 personal sections of famous people in the Far East in alphabetical order: from Abramovich R.A. to Yarovaya I.A.

== History ==
The site "Debri-DV" was created by journalist Konstantin Pronyakin and web programmer Pavel Bakanov.

On April 20, 2006, the site was opened as an electronic private archive. The main archive fund consists of newspaper and magazine publications, published books, and manuscripts on Far Eastern (RF) topics. Access to archival documents is open in electronic form.

On June 16, 2011, the site began distributing information from the media outlet Debri-DV, according to the media registration certificate issued by Roskomnadzor.

In 2010, the site opened a section called "Paper Newspapers" specifically for printed publications that do not have their own websites.

On April 1, 2013, a news and current information column was launched on the site.

In 2015, a blog section was opened on the site.

In 2017, the "Open Palm" sign appeared in the imprint, which the editors explained by the fact that "the media does not receive subsidies and does not engage in propaganda".
