= Marinin =

Marinin (Russian: Маринин) is a Russian masculine surname, its feminine counterpart is Marinina. It may refer to

- Alexandra Marinina, pen name of the Russian writer Marina Alekseyeva (born 1957)
- Maxim Marinin (born 1977), Russian pair skater
