= Maksim Moshkow =

Russian system administrator and developer (born 1966)

Maksim Moshkov
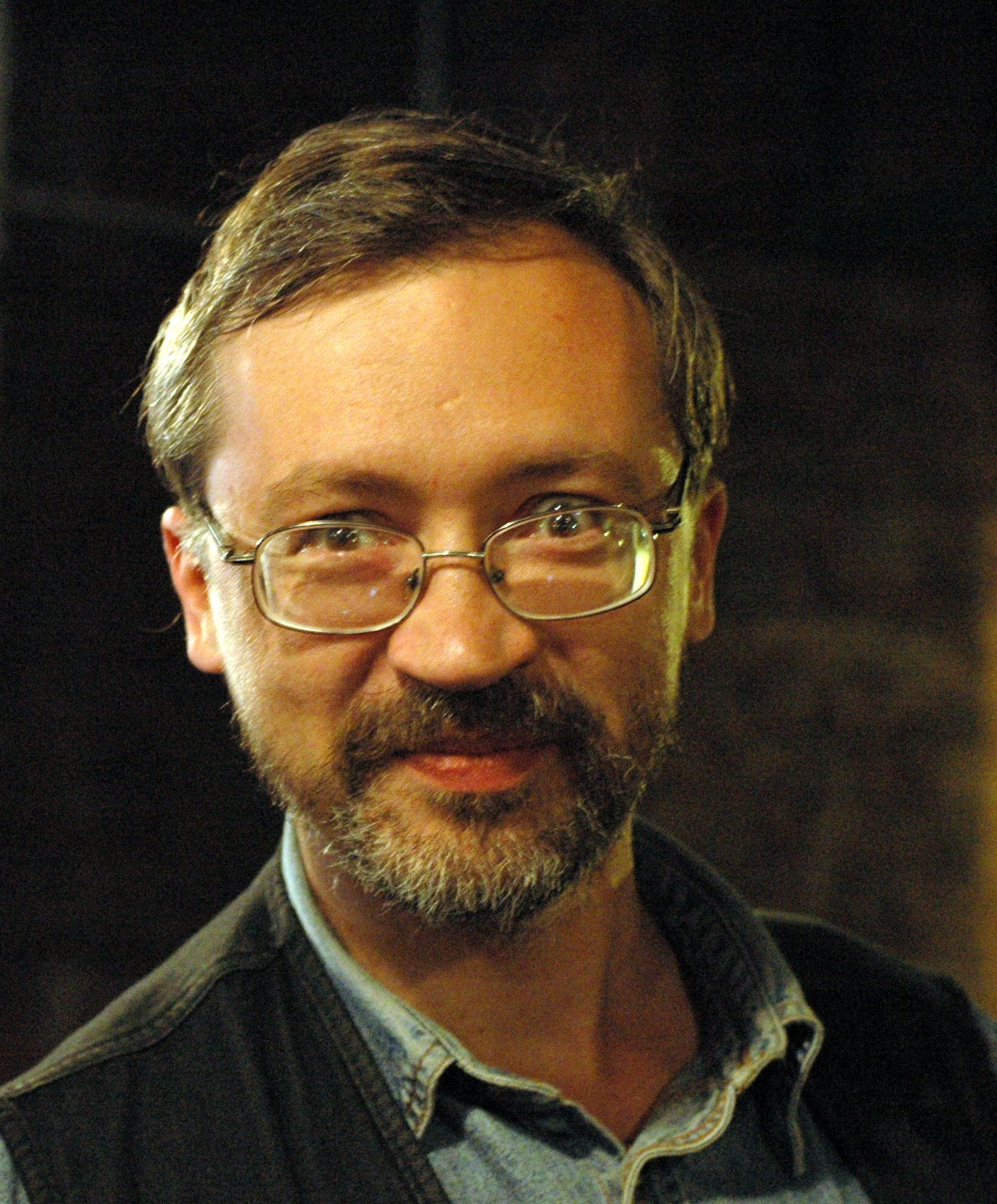
- Born: 13 October 1966 (age 58); Moscow, Soviet Union
- Occupations: System administrator; web developer

Maksim Eugenievich Moshkow (Russian: Максим Евгеньевич Мошков; born 13 October 1966) is a public figure of the Russian Internet segment, the Runet, most famous for his project of "Oldest e-library in Runet- Russian Internet", the Lib.ru aka Moshkow's Library.

== Biography ==
Moshkow graduated from Moscow State University's Department of Mechanics and Mathematics. Since 1991 he has been an employee of the Scientific Research Institute of System Development, where he among other duties is administrating the campus local network. He also took up teaching courses on Unix, TCP/IP, HP OpenView, VMware.

Moshkow programmed some major media Internet projects like Gazeta.Ru, Lenta.Ru, Vesti.Ru, etc. as well as authoring Lib.ru also known as Maksim Moshkow's Library, which started to operate in November 1994 and proved to be the largest and most comprehensive Russian electronic library.

He is a laureate of the Internet Prize ROTOR-2005 as the "Man of the Year". He is married, and has one son and three daughters.

== See also ==
- Gevorkyan v. Moshkov
