= Lib.ru =

Russian digital library, founded 1994

Screenshot of main page

Lib.ru, also known as Maksim Moshkow's Library (Russian: Библиотека Максима Мошкова, romanized: Biblioteka Maksima Moshkova, started to operate in November 1994) is the oldest electronic library in the Russian Internet segment.

Founded and supported by Maksim Moshkow, it receives contributions mainly from users who send texts they scanned and processed (OCR, proofreading). This method of acquisition provides the library a broad and efficient augmentability, though sometimes it adversely affects the quality (errors, omissions).

The structure of the library includes a section where one can publish his own literary texts ("Samizdat" journal, named after the samizdat of the Soviet era), a project for music publishing ("Music hosting"), a travel notes project ("Foreign countries") and some other sections.

Maksim Moshkow's Library received several Ru-net Awards, including the National Intel Internet Award (2003) and Runet Prize.

The headline on the site Lib.ru says "With support from the Federal Press and Mass Communications Agency". According to Moshkow, his project received $35,000 from that organization in September 2005, which indicates some level of government support for the online publishing of in-copyright works.

Maksim Moshkow's project could be compared to some Wikimedia Foundation projects and is sometimes referred to as Russia's Project Gutenberg.

== KM Online vs. Maksim Moshkow's Library ==
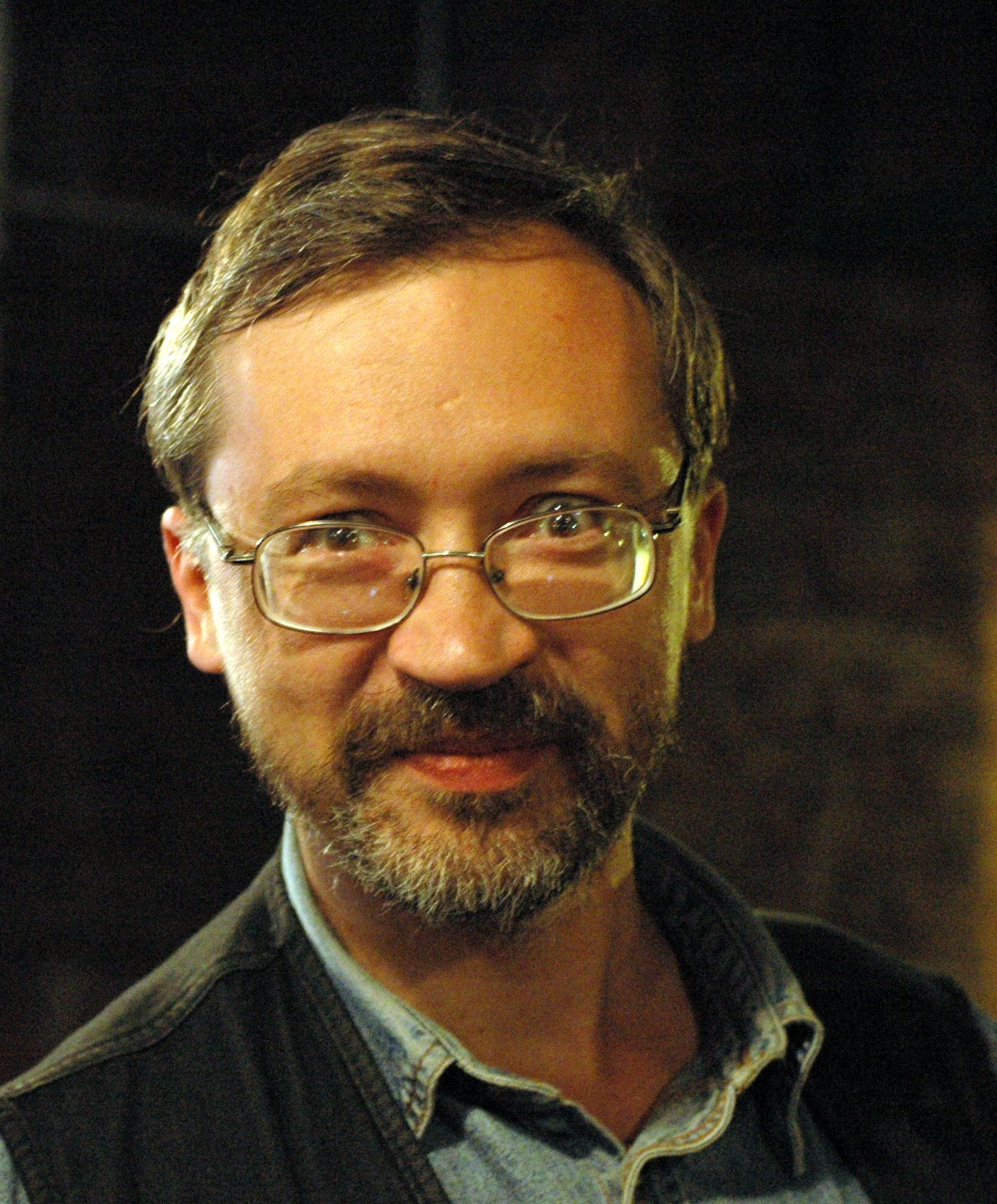
Maksim Moshkow

On 1 April 2004, the "KM Online" media company, which is known for forming its own library by copying texts from the other electronic libraries, issued a lawsuit against Maksim Moshkow's Library in the name of Eduard Gevorkian, Marina Alekseyeva (pen-name "Alexandra Marinina"), Vasili Golovachov and Elena Katasonova. It was later discovered that only Gevorkian had had real claims against Moshkow. Moshkow's lawyer was Andrey Mironov from the Artemy Lebedev Studio, while KM's interests were presented by the so-called "National Society for Digital Technologies (NOCIT)".

This case became a precedent in the Russian legal practice which illustrated pressure on an electronic library caused by a copyright violation lawsuit.

On 30 March 2005, Moscow's Ostankino city district court imposed a penalty on Maksim Moshkow to pay Eduard Gevorkian a total of 3000 Russian rubles (around US$120) as compensation for moral damage. The ruling did not mention any compensation for copyright violation.

On 30 May 2006, another court order ruled that Moshkow had no right to publish online the works of William Shakespeare, Harrison and Zinoviev and ordered him to pay 10,000 rubles in each case. Moshkow's lawyer said he would appeal the decision.

== See also ==
- Runivers
- Flibusta
- Google Books
- List of libraries in Russia
