= Vladimir Platonov =

Soviet, Belarusian, and Russian mathematician

Vladimir Petrovich Platonov (Belarusian: Уладзімір Пятровіч Платонаў, Uladzimir Piatrovic Platonau; Russian: Влади́мир Петро́вич Плато́нов; born 1 December 1939, Stayki village, Vitebsk Region, Byelorussian SSR) is a Soviet, Belarusian and Russian mathematician. He is an expert in algebraic geometry and topology and member of the Russian Academy of Sciences.

From 1992–2004 he worked at research centers in the United States, Canada and Germany.

== Education ==
In 1961 Platonov graduated with highest distinction from Belarusian State University. In 1963 he received his Ph.D. from the Academy of Sciences of Belarus. In 1967, Platonov received his Doctor of Science degree from the Academy of Sciences of USSR.

== Career ==
At age 28 Platonov received a title of full professor at Belarus State. This made him the youngest full professor in the nation's history. In 1972 he became an Academician of the National Academy of Sciences of Belarus and its President (1987–1993). He has been an Academician of the Russian/USSR Academy of Sciences since 1987. He was the Director of the Institute of Mathematics of the Academy of Sciences of Belarus from 1977 to 1992.

== Research ==
His interests are algebra, algebraic geometry and number theory. He solved the Strong approximation problem, developed the reduced K-theory and solved the Tannaka–Artin problem. He solved the Kneser-Tits and Grothendieck problems. Together with F. Grunewald he solved the arithmeticity problem for finite extensions of arithmetic groups and the rigidity problem for arithmetic subgroups of algebraic groups with radical. Platonov solved the rationality problem for spinor varieties and the Dieudonne problem on spinor norms.

Platonov was an invited speaker of the International Congresses of Mathematicians in Vancouver (1974), Helsinki (1978) and the European Congress of Mathematicians in Budapest (1996).

He is a member of the Canadian Mathematical Society and from 1993 to 2001 was a Professor of the Faculty of Mathematics of the University of Waterloo in Waterloo, Ontario, Canada.

He is the author, with Andrei Rapinchuk, of Algebraic Groups and Number Theory.

He currently works as a Chief Science Officer of Scientific Research Institute of System Development (NIISI RAN).

== Assault conviction ==
On November 9, 1999, Platonov appeared in court on a bail hearing on a charge of attempted murder for an attack on his wife. He was convicted of assault. The court gave him a conditional sentence of two years. In September 2001, Platonov took early retirement as a professor of the University of Waterloo.

== Awards ==
- Order of the Red Banner of Labour
- 1968: Lenin Komsomol Prize, for a series of works in topological group theory
- 1978: Lenin Prize in Science and Technology, for a fundamental series of works "Arithmetics of Algebraic Groups and Reduced K-Theory" ("Арифметика алгебраических групп и приведенная К-теория")
- 1993: Humboldt Prize

== See also ==
- List of University of Waterloo people
