= Flibusta =

Russian shadow library project

Flibusta (Russian: Флибуста) is a shadow library project mainly for Russian language books. Its collection comprised over 630,000 books. Dissatisfied with the commercialization of Librusec, Russia's main shadow library, the website was established by a group of volunteers in October 2009. The founder and administrator of the site was known as "Stiver", who lived in Germany. The website had been the subject of legal action by Russian publishing houses on several occasions. German police investigated Stiver for two years but took no action against him in 2016. In 2016, the site was blocked in Russia according to a Moscow City Court's ruling.

In 2024, Stiver announced the closure of the site soon due to his terminal illness.

On October 22, 2024, it was disclosed that Stiver has ended his life on October 20, 2024, through assisted suicide.

In July 2026 flibusta.is still works.
