= Blocking of YouTube in Russia =

- Part of Internet censorship in Russia
- Date: Announcement 12 July 2024 Implementation 1 August 2024 (2 years ago – present) Full blockade 12 February 2026 (8 months ago – present)
- Location: Russia; Internet

The blocking of YouTube in Russia became apparent from July 2024. The Russian government introduced restrictions that limited the access speed to the video hosting service YouTube within the territory of Russia. The Russian government gave a number of reasons for this, including that YouTube's owners, Google, were not in compliance with Russian legislation and had not invested in YouTube's assets based inside Russia. Other observers suggested it was an attempt by the Russian government to pressure Google, and to restrict the ability of Russian residents to access material which was not controlled by the Russian authorities in the aftermath of Russia's invasion of Ukraine in February 2022.

YouTube became fully blocked by Roskomnadzor since 12 February 2026, making it inaccessible in Russia without the use of VPN.

== YouTube restricted from July 2024 ==
First official confirmation of the measures initiated by the Russian government came in July 2024 from Alexander Khinshtein, the head of the State Duma Committee on Information Policy. Khinshtein said the step was necessary to make the site comply with Russian legislation, and was not targeted at Russian users. The speed reduction was anticipated to reach 70% but would not affect mobile devices, according to Khinshtein. He blamed Google for not investing in its local subsidiary, allowing it to go bankrupt, and for having overtly anti-Russian policies. Google said it filed for bankruptcy after the Russian authorities seized its bank account.

Other factors included the unhappiness of the Russian authorities that certain bloggers and musicians such as Shaman who supported the invasion of Ukraine had been removed from YouTube by Google, leading to accusations of Russophobia by the platform. Attempts at forcing YouTube to alter their content through fines were not going to work, in the context of international sanctions, leading to the slowdown as an alternative form of leverage by the Russian government.

Roskomnadzor, the federal agency responsible for media censorship in Russia, unofficially warned telecom companies of performance problems before the invasion of Ukraine, suggesting this would be the potential impact of sanctions. The agency started to use deep packet inspection devices, known locally as TSPU (Technical Solution to Counter Threats), which Russia's internet service providers (ISP) were required to install, in order to throttle the speed of YouTube's videos. Meduza and The Bell suggested this was on the direct orders of the Kremlin.

RuTube, Platforma and in particular VK Video were seen as replacement local providers. VK Video is headed by Vladimir Kiriyenko, whose father, Sergey Kiriyenko works for Vladimir Putin. Russian language bloggers, who depend on YouTube's advertising monetisation revenues, were among those caught up in YouTube's restrictions. VK Video, a loss making organisation, tried to attract these bloggers to switch to VK, but since VK lacked YouTube's complex monetisation algorithms the bloggers received a negotiated fee from VK for their appearances.

In their 2024 review of freedom of the internet, Freedom House listed Russia towards the lowest end of the ranking, with five other countries scoring lower than Russia.

== Impact of slowdown ==
The speed of Youtube for users was deemed as usable for audio-only playback, whereas video playback quality was effectively reduced to 240p. There was criticism of the Russian authorities' actions, with parliamentarians challenging the decision. Denis Parfenov, a member of the State Duma, pointed out that many YouTube users would be watching content related to sports, cooking or other pastimes.

A report on the speed restrictions on YouTube by Mediascope estimated that the service lost 30 million active users since the slowdown started, from the 93 million users before the restrictions. There were rises in traffic from other countries such as Germany and the Netherlands, but it was not possible to determine whether that was the impact of VPN usage. Overall there has been a reduction in online video use across different channels, with audiences switching to conventional television viewing.

Nevertheless YouTube remained the leading source for advertising revenue for Russian bloggers and YouTube continued to operate in Russia throughout 2024 and 2025 despite the restrictions. The Russian government continued to add their own publicity material on to YouTube, to ensure it was viewed more widely.

Article 29 of the Russian Constitution guarantees the freedom of mass media, without censorship.

== Workarounds ==
Some users in Russia resorted to using VPN connections to bypass the restrictions. There were other social media platforms restricted in Russia, where the use of VPNs could help users to evade restrictions. Nevertheless the number of available suppliers for VPN in Russia was also diminishing. Other options included sideloading options on Android devices, using apps such as Bilayna (Beeline), and Tor browsers.

=== Official services ===
In January 2026, Russian internet service Beeline updated their mobile app, adding the ability to watch YouTube videos without any block circumvention services. The feature is available with a "Plan B" subscription and does not allow watching videos outside the Beeline app.

== Full blockade of YouTube since February 2026 ==
On 12 February 2026, Roskomnadzor imposed a full nationwide block on the platform, making YouTube inaccessible in Russia without the use of a VPN. The decision to block YouTube marked the culmination of a years-long deterioration in relations between the platform and the Russian state following the Russian invasion of Ukraine in 2022.

== See also ==
- Censorship of YouTube
