= Kasparov.ru =

Russian-language website

Kasparov.ru (titled, but not actually addressed, in Russian as Каспаров.Ru) is a Russian-language website (сreated on 27 May 2005), critical of Vladimir Putin, operated by Garry Kasparov. As of March 2013 it was the 816th most popular website in Russia, but it has fallen down to 4,098 by September 2015.

The website has been a target of DDoS attacks in the past. The site was censored in Russia in early 2014.

== See also ==
- Censorship in Russia
