= Librusec =

Free library internet portal

- Website type: Digital library
- Available in: Russian
- Owner: Ilja Larin
- Creator: Ilja Larin
- Website: lib.rus.ec
- Commercial: Yes (from November 26, 2009)
- Registration: Optional, but registration allows to use much more functions
- Launched: June 2007; 19 years ago
- Works and develops

Librusec (Russian: Либрусек) is a library internet portal, the owner of which, Ilja Larin (Russian: Илья Ларин), lives in Ecuador. Most of the content is in the Russian language, but the collection also has significant material in Ukrainian, Belarusian, English, German, French, Spanish and other languages. According to the rules of the library, Librusec calls itself a pirate library, opposes copyright laws and claims to operate under the laws of Ecuador. Users are asked to refrain from using it if it is illegal in their countries.

== History ==
Librusec was launched in June 2007 by Ilja Larin. According to the site server statistics, on 13 March 2009 the number of visits per day exceeded 100000.

On July 1, 2009 the creators announced a private BitTorrent tracker, opened on July 15, 2009.

Librusec became a commercial website on November 26, 2009.

In 2009, the site won the ROTOR prize as a Digital Library.

== Blacklisting ==
On 11 November 2012, Librusec's IP address was added to the Russian Internet blacklist, making it inaccessible from most ISPs in Russia. According to a leaked copy of the blacklist, the entire website was blocked for a description of marijuana soup in a Russian translation of The Anarchist Cookbook. The IP address was unblocked on 13 November after The Anarchist Cookbook was removed by Librusec administrators.

== See also ==
- Library Genesis
- Library.nu
- Sci-Hub
