= Alexandra Marinina =

Russian writer (born 1957)

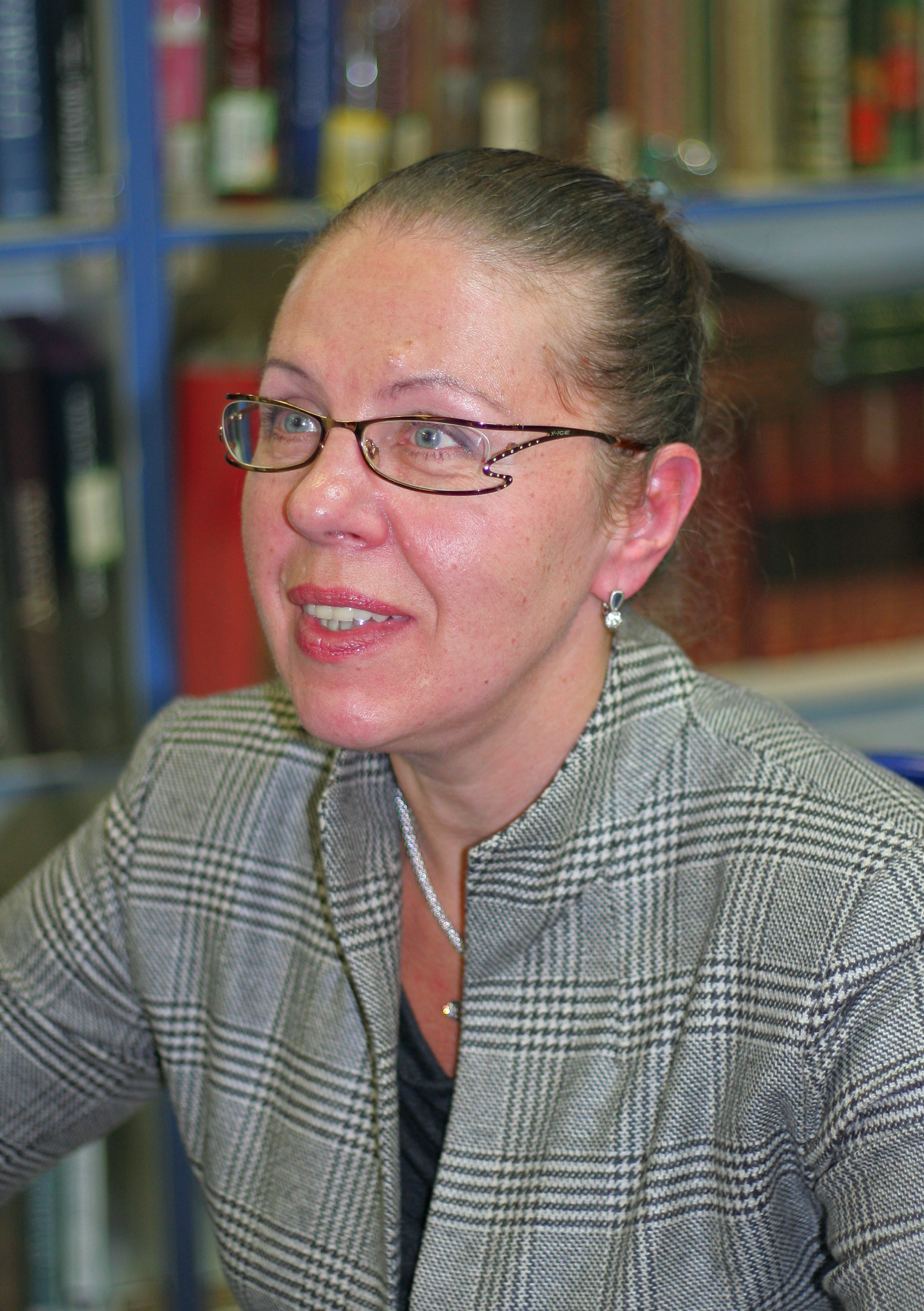
Marinina in 2010

Alexandra Marinina Russian: Алекса́ндра Мари́нина (born June 16, 1957, real name Marina Anatolyevna Alekseyeva Russian: Мари́на Анато́льевна Алексе́ева) is a Russian writer of detective stories.

== Biography ==
Marinina was born in Lviv, Ukraine to a family of lawyers. She lived in Leningrad until 1971 and has lived in Moscow since then. She received a degree in law from the Moscow State University in 1979.

From 1979 to 1998 she worked in research and education units of the Russian Ministry of Internal Affairs (MVD). She studied the personality of criminals with anomalies of mentality and criminals who have committed repeated violent crimes, earning a Ph.D. (Kandidat of Law degree) in 1986. She resigned from the police militsiya system (a semi-formal term for the set of MVD organizations) in February, 1998 to become a full-time writer. Before her resignation, she had the rank of the lieutenant colonel in the police.

Marinina started writing in 1991, when, together with her colleague Alexander Gorkin, she wrote a detective story that was published in magazine Militsiya. In December 1992, she finished her first novel Confluence of Circumstances, which was also published in Militsiya magazine, in 1993.

She has written over 50 novels, published in over 17 million copies and translated into over 20 languages. Most of her novels have a common central character Anastasia (Nastya) Kamenskaya. The television series Kamenskaya, based on eight of Marinina's novels, was shown on national Russian TV, and also in Latvia, Lithuania, Ukraine, Poland, Germany and France.

Marinina has received several awards. In 1995 Marinina received the prize of the Ministry of Internal Affairs of Russia for the best book about the work of the Russian militsiya, for the books Death for the Sake of Death and Away Game. She was recognized as "The Writer of Year" by the 1998 Moscow International Book Fair, based on the sales of the books in 1997, and received an award from Ogonyok magazine for "Success of the Year" in 1998.
