= Valery Kovalyov =

Russian entrepreneur and philanthropist (1970–2021)

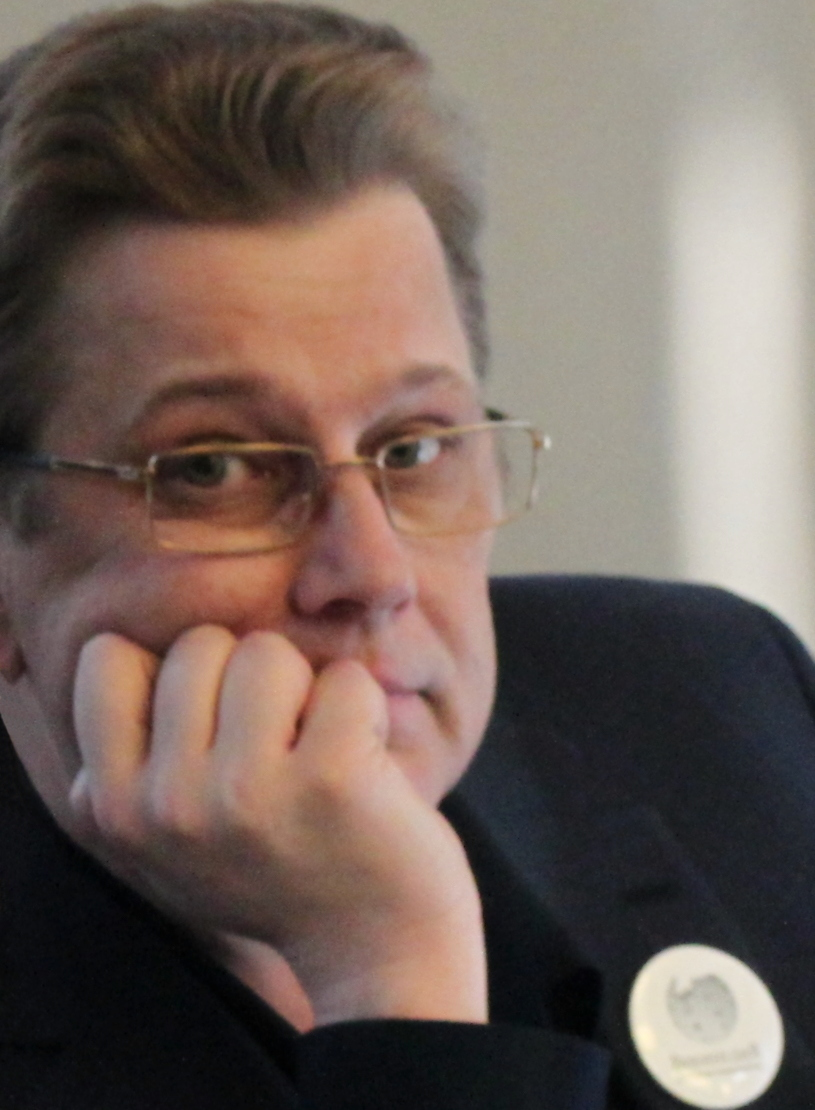

Valery Kovalyov (Russian: Валерий Валерьевич Ковалёв; 24 April 1970 – 31 December 2021, Moscow, Russia) — Russian entrepreneur, philanthropist, and Wikipedian.

Kovalyov was a Russian entrepreneur, founder and owner of one of the largest Russian online stores - Holodilnik.ru. According to Forbes in 2014, the company, headed by Valery Kovalyov, was in sixth place among online stores in Russia with revenues of $310 million.

He also wrote "a huge number of high-quality articles" for the Russian Wikipedia (according the executive director of Wikimedia RU Stanislav Kozlovsky).

== Early biography ==
Valery Kovalyov was born on April 24, 1970, in the city of Neuruppin (GDR) into the family of the Soviet military Test pilot Valery Ivanovich Kovalyov (born 1946), who served in the Western Group of Forces. In connection with the father's service, the family moved many times within the USSR - from Komsomolsk-on-Amur to Tbilisi.

In 1987, Valery Kovalyov-junior entered the Moscow Aviation Institute, the faculty of “Aircraft and Helicopter Engineering”, from which he graduated in 1994 with a degree in Flight Test Systems Engineer.

== Entrepreneurship ==
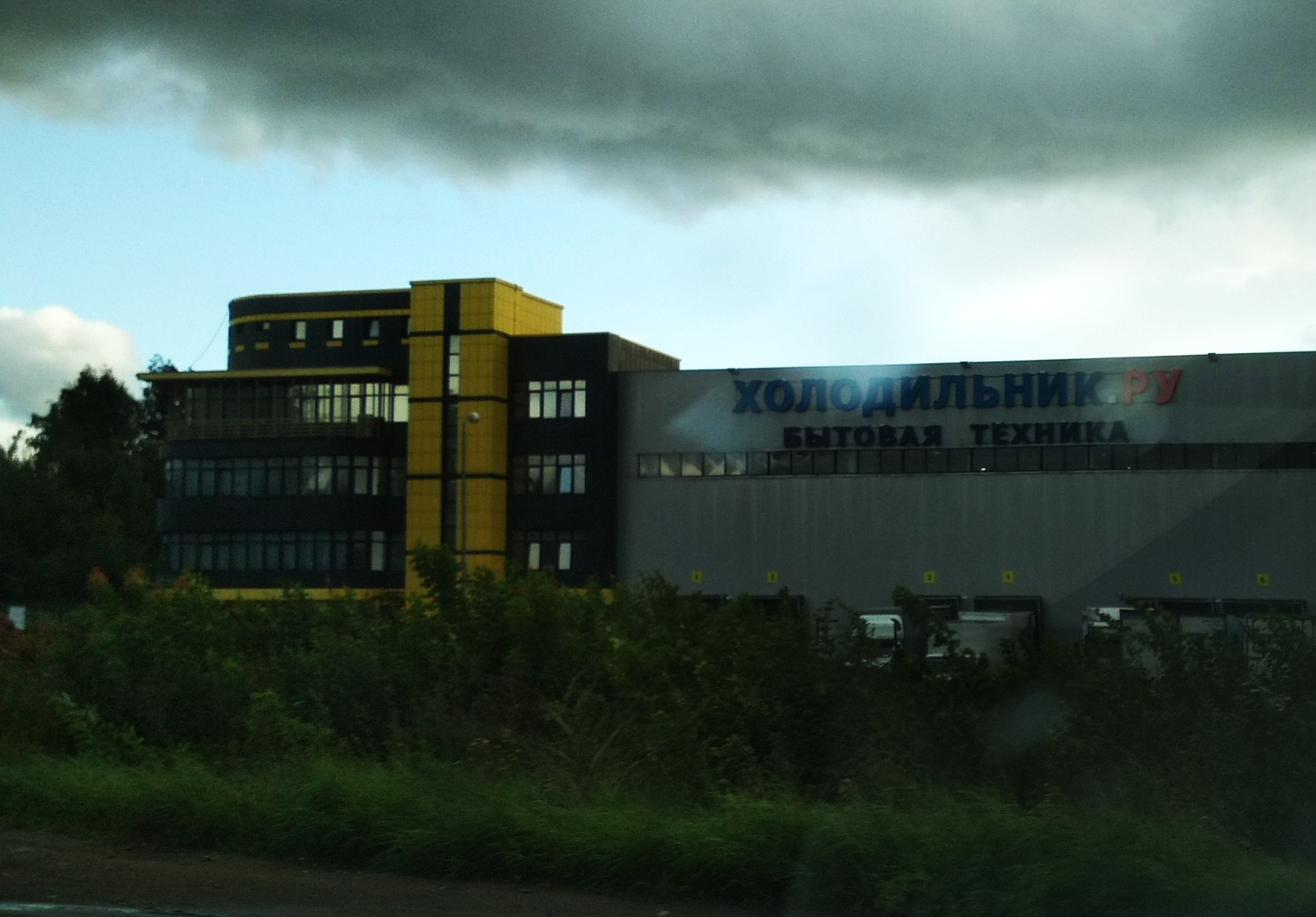
Holodilnik.ru

During his student years, Kovalyov organized together with his wife Svetlana wholesale and retail trade in refrigerators, having rented a part of the area in the "Svet" store for this.

In 2003, he registered the site Holodilnik.ru with a catalog of goods and began to gradually transfer trade to an online format. Two years later, the product range offered by Kovalyov's company expanded, and the website was improved: for example, consumers got the opportunity not only to use the “Order Table” section, where wishes were formed about new models, but also to see open statistics (goods in stock, in delivery service, on the way to the buyer) in real time. On the forum of the site, the founder of the company, as a rule, answered questions from users himself.

In 2014, according to Forbes, Holodilnik.ru, with a revenue of $310 million, was in sixth place among the largest online stores in Russia.

== Wikipedia ==
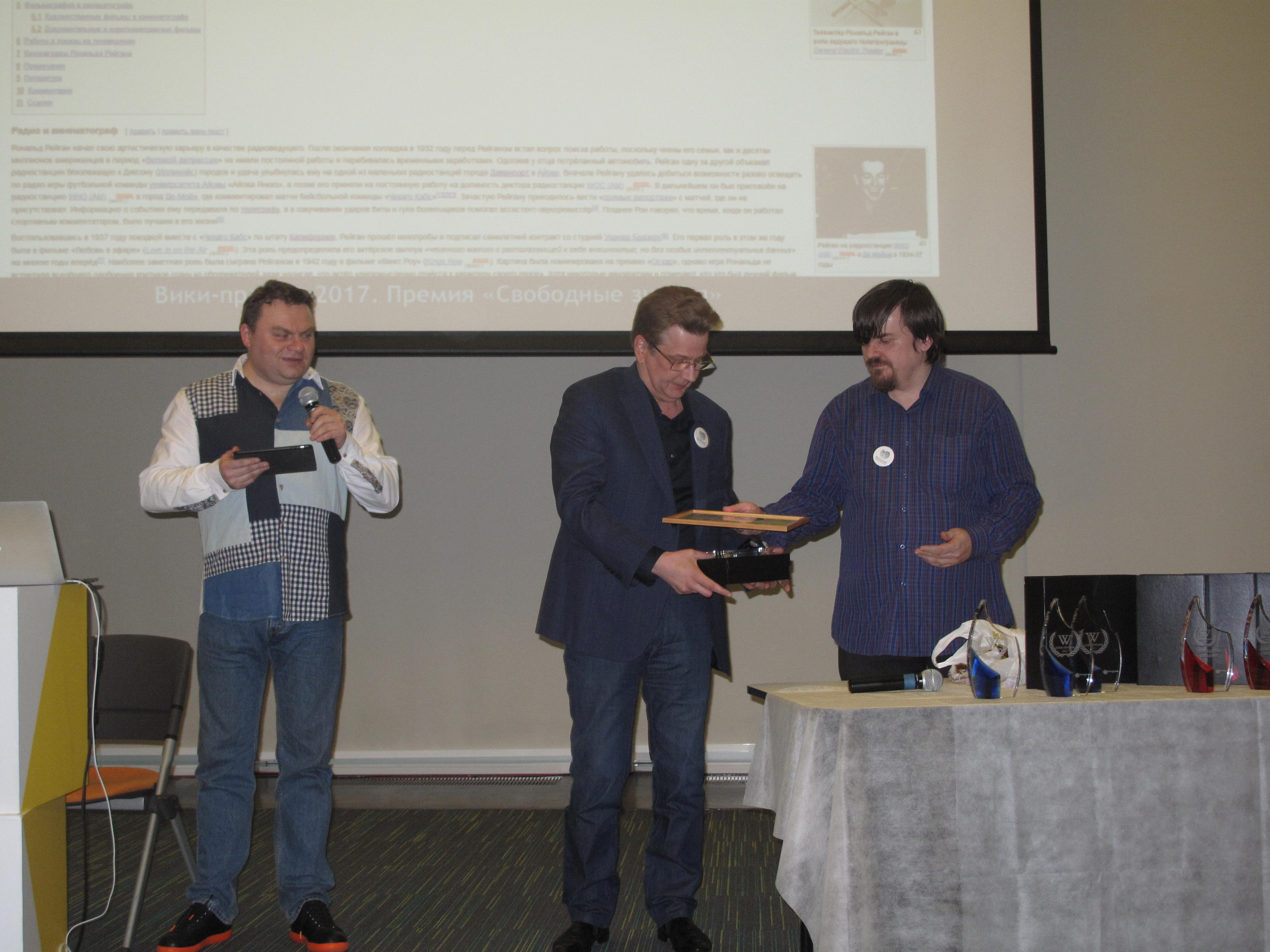
Valery Kovalyov at the Wiki-award 2017 (Moscow, April 25, 2017)

From 2016 to December 30, 2021, he participated in the Russian Wikipedia under the nickname NoFrost. The nickname is formed from the No frost cooling technology of the same name used in refrigerators.

Since 2018 Valery - volunteer of the OTRS service (later VRT). Since the end of 2016, he has been electing the Candidates for Selected Lists and Portals project. One of the founders of the Il Dottore award, awarded to active authors of high-profile articles. Founder and member of the jury of the competition "Russian Literature".

Kovalyov wrote (via the executive director of Wikimedia RU Stanislav Kozlovsky) "a huge number of high-quality articles".

== Sources ==
- Спиридонов М. Ю. (2012). А. Митрохина (ed.). Рунетология. Кто управляет русским Интернетом?. М.: Манн, Иванов и Фербер. ISBN 978-5-91657-303-9.

Media related to Valery Kovalev at Wikimedia Commons
