= Ruwiki (Wikipedia fork) =

Russian online encyclopedia

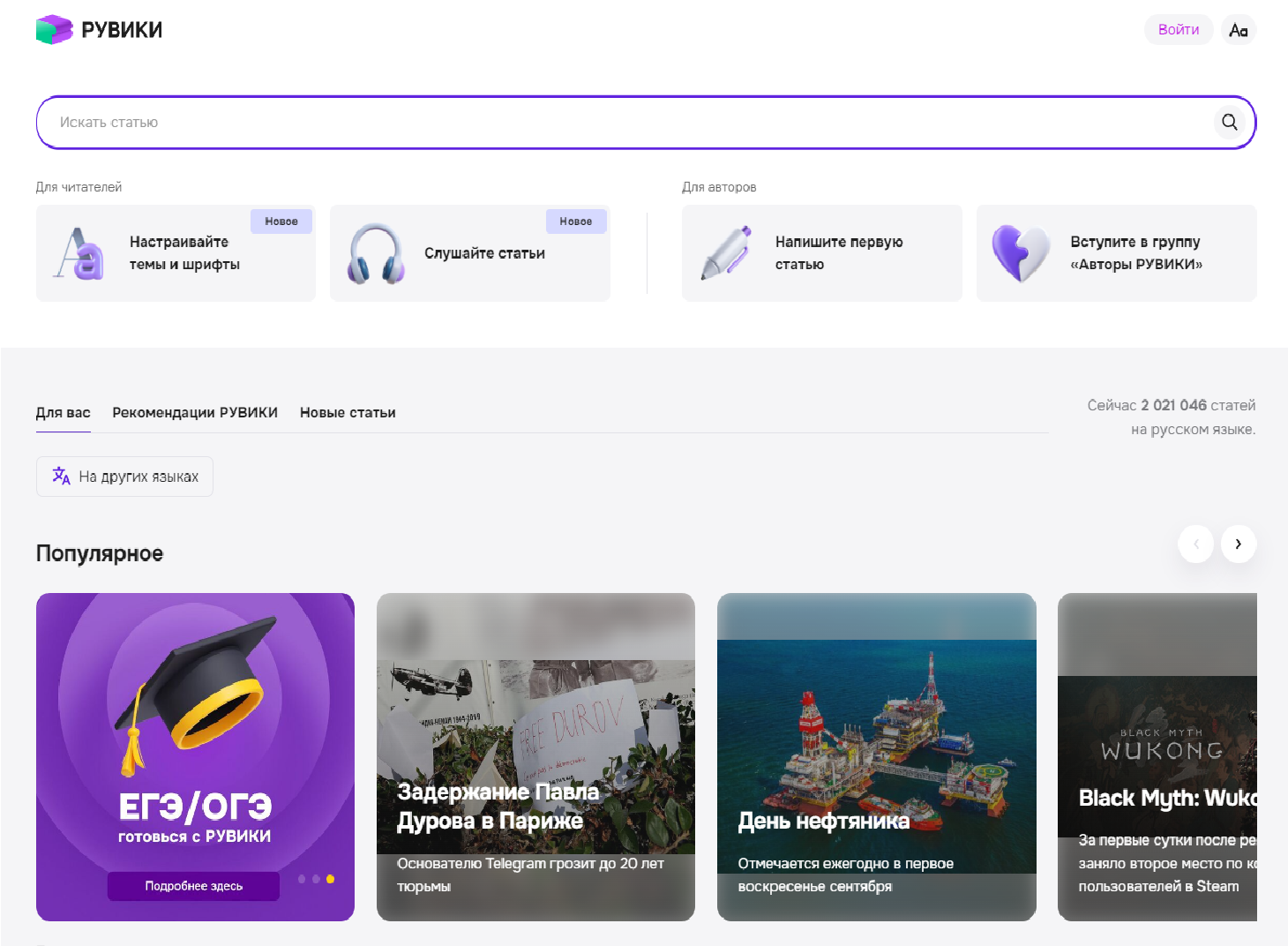
- Main page of the Russian Ruwiki
- Native name: Рувики
- Website type: Online encyclopedia
- Available in: Multilingual
- Predecessor: Russian Wikipedia
- Country of origin: Russia
- Owner: ANO "Ruwiki Internet Encyclopedia"
- Founder: Vladimir Medeyko
- Website: ruwiki.ru
- Commercial: No
- Registration: Required to edit, form required to edit specific areas
- Launched: 24 June 2023 (beta); 15 January 2024 (full launch)
- Content license: Creative Commons Attribution-ShareAlike 4.0 International (until 22 March 2026)

Ruwiki (Russian: Рувики, romanized: Ruviki) is a Russian multilingual online encyclopedia, with editions in Russian and other languages of the Russian Federation. It was launched on 24 June 2023 as a fork of the Russian-language Wikipedia, and has been described by media as "Putin-friendly" and "Kremlin-compliant", as well as a "[Russian] state-sponsored encyclopedia that is a clone of the original Russian Wikipedia but which conveniently has been edited to omit things that could cast the Russian government in poor light." A full-scale launch took place on 15 January 2024.

The project is led by Vladimir Medeyko, who was formerly involved with the Russian Wikipedia project and was a director of Wikimedia RU. Medeyko reportedly created the project as an alternative to the Russian Wikipedia, which would be more friendly to the Russian government.

The words "рувики" and its English version, "ruwiki", have long been used to refer to Russian Wikipedia among Wikipedians.

== History ==
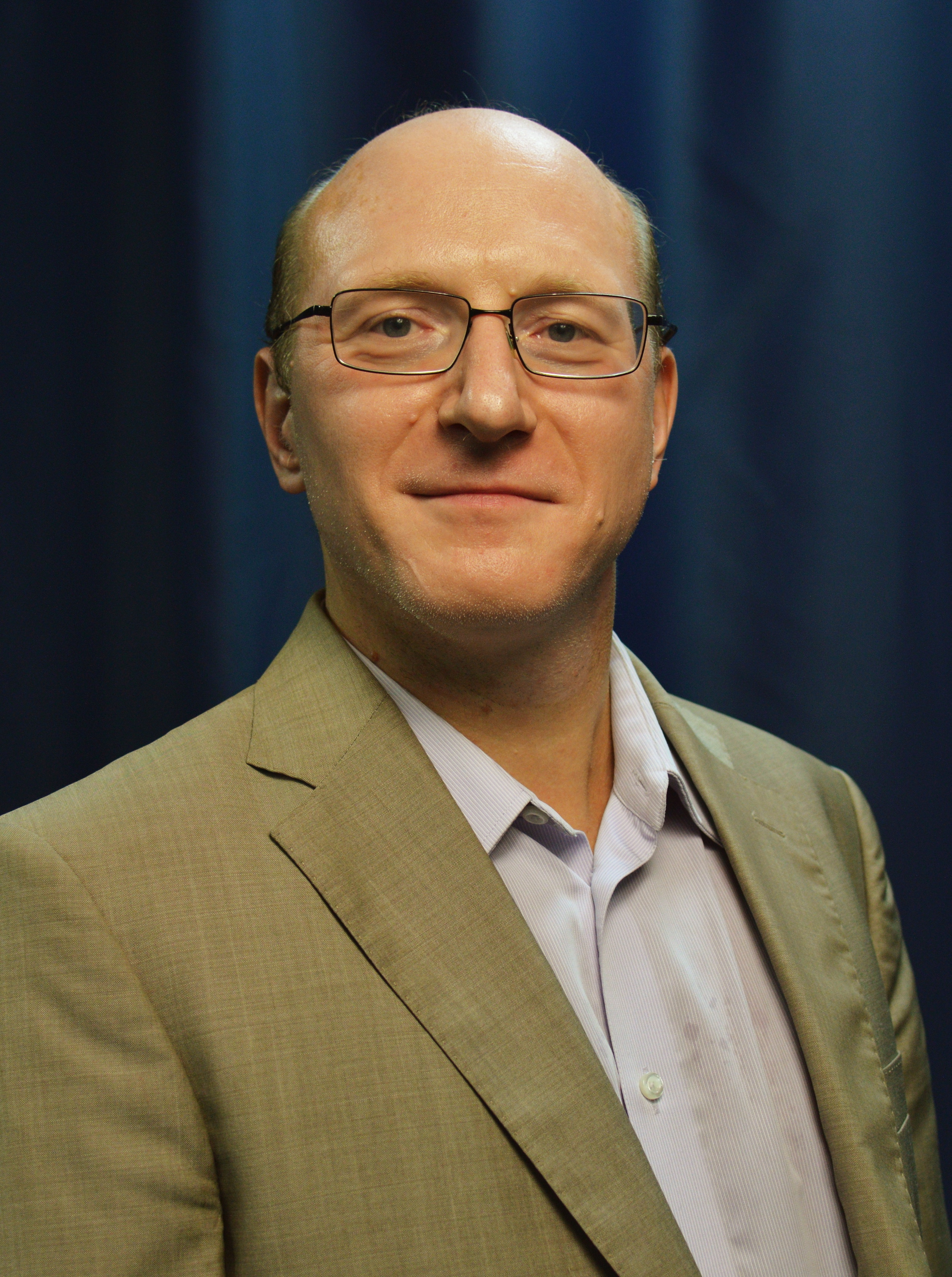
Medeyko in 2021

On 24 May 2023, long-time Wikimedia RU director Vladimir Medeyko announced Ruwiki as a Russian fork of Wikipedia on the Russian technology website Habr. The Russian politician Anton Gorelkin stated that the new website would be hosted on Russian servers and managed by a Russian organization. Medeyko has stated that Ruwiki will follow Russian laws, but is independent of the Russian government.

In late May 2023, Stanislav Kozlovsky, then executive director of Wikimedia RU, stated that "anyone can take Wikipedia content and use it, it's perfectly normal. It's not normal to use the authority of the director of Wikimedia RU for this purpose and to do it in secret for several years".

On 21 August 2023, without further announcement, user registration was opened for everyone on Ruwiki.

At the end of November 2023, five new editions of Ruwiki were added: Bashkir, Mari, Sakha, Tatar and Chechen.

In December 2023, Ruwiki signed a long-term cooperation agreement with the Museum of Moscow.

On 28 December 2023, six new editions of Ruwiki were added: Altai, Tuvan, Mokshan, Udmurt, Chuvash and Erzyan.

In April 2024, Ruwiki launched new editions in Buryat, Veps, Ingush, Kalmyk, Komi, Permian Komi, Livvian-Karelian and Khakas languages with a total number of articles in the new sections exceeding 29 thousand, the website interface was improved and portals with materials for preparation for the Unified State Exam and Basic State Exam were launched.

In August 2024, the Hill Mari language edition of Ruwiki was launched.

In October 2024, the portal launched a mechanism for forming answers to questions based on the YandexGPT neural network trained on Ruwiki articles, providing the user with information, references to relevant source articles and articles for a more complete familiarization. During the same month, the materials from the Great Russian Encyclopedia were incorporated into the Ruwiki portal.

In 2025, artificial intelligence-based services were added to Ruwiki, which began to be used to create new articles and update the content of existing ones. Ruwiki's creators cite the use of a neural network as a key advantage over competitors. Journalists from the publication Meduza note its uselessness: Ruwiki's neural network is incapable of providing precise answers, uses vague, evasive wording, and also broadcasts unverified or contradictory Kremlin propaganda theses.

In December 2025, access to Ruwiki was added to the Sferum educational space, which operates in the Max (app).

As of 1 January 2026, only verified editors can edit Ruwiki.

As of 22 March 2026, it is no longer possible to edit Ruwiki freely.

== Content and editorial policy ==
Ruwiki was created by copying all 1.9 million articles from the Russian Wikipedia, as well as several media components from Wikimedia Commons, and data items from Wikidata. However, articles containing content contrary to the Russian government's official line have been removed. Removals of content considered "anti-Russian propaganda" include coverage of the Russo-Ukrainian War, the Wagner rebellion, and criticism of Vladimir Putin.

In mid-July 2023, Ruwiki was not yet editable by third parties. Medeyko had stated that he planned to allow public editing to resume, but that content will be vetted by panels of experts. As of August 2023, Ruwiki was available to edit by all registered accounts. Analysis from the independent Russian media outlet Mediazona shows that the majority of Ruwiki edits take place during weekday work hours. Mediazona deduces that teams of paid writers are responsible for Ruwiki's editorial activity, which contrasts with Wikipedia's volunteer model.

== Finances ==
There is no reliable data on the source of funding for Ruwiki. Vladimir Medeyko reports the presence of private investors, but does not disclose them, indicating that there is a corresponding agreement with investors. According to Vladimir Medeyko, the project receives money from wealthy investors with whom he is pleased to cooperate, who understand Ruwiki's tasks and share the project's goals. Edits made by several administrators in the article about Naila Asker-Zadeh, as well as some other facts indicate a possible connection between Ruwiki and VTB Bank. The money was presumably allocated with the expectation of the future commercial success of the project: if the site becomes popular, it will be possible to earn money through ads. Vladimir Medeyko notes that investors expect to make a profit, but they are very interested in Ruwiki's objectives – free content, access to knowledge for everyone.

Ruwiki has launched an active advertising campaign: It purchases advertising from popular bloggers (e.g., Alexander Pushny, on the channel "Cosmos Just"), since spring 2024 it has been advertised on numerous street banners in 19 Russian cities (including Moscow, Rostov-on-Don, Omsk, Krasnoyarsk), and one of the trains of the Sokolnicheskaya line of the Moscow Metro was decorated for 6 months as a themed "Ruwiki's Educational Train". Also in support of outdoor advertising, similarly styled banners were developed for demonstration on digital platforms. Interesting facts appeared on the homepage of Yandex, on the websites of Lenta.ru, Gismeteo, Afisha and others. One Ruwiki employee told the publication Point that authors who write articles in Ruwiki for payment also advertise the site on social networks, leaving positive one-size-fits-all comments from fake profiles.

Two years since its creation, over 2 billion rubles has been invested in the project. As of 2025, the company that owns Ruwiki remains unprofitable.

== Public launch ==
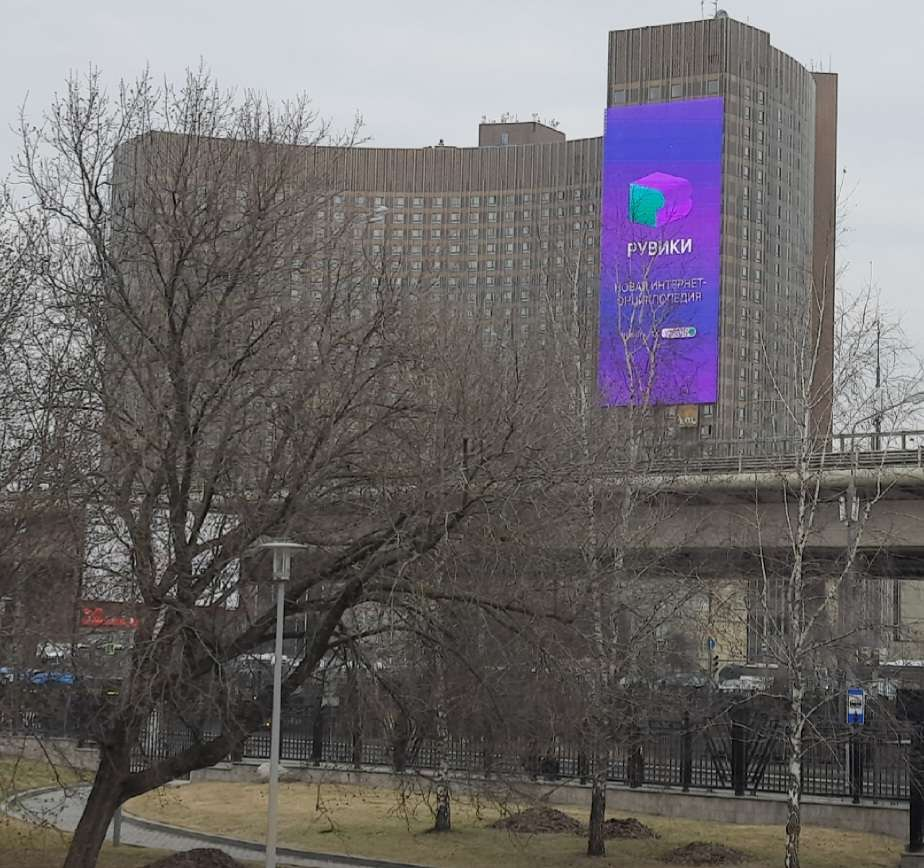
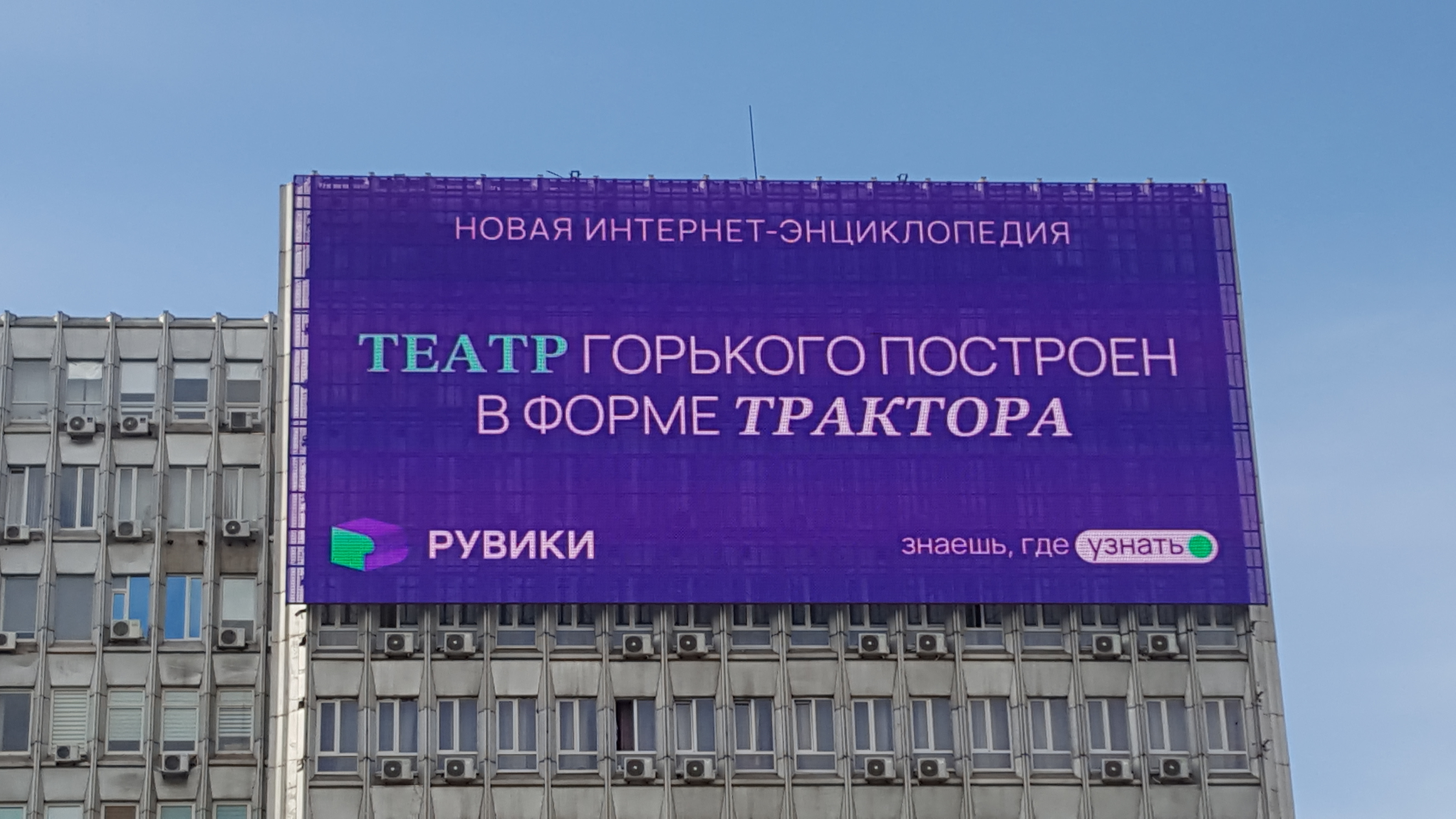
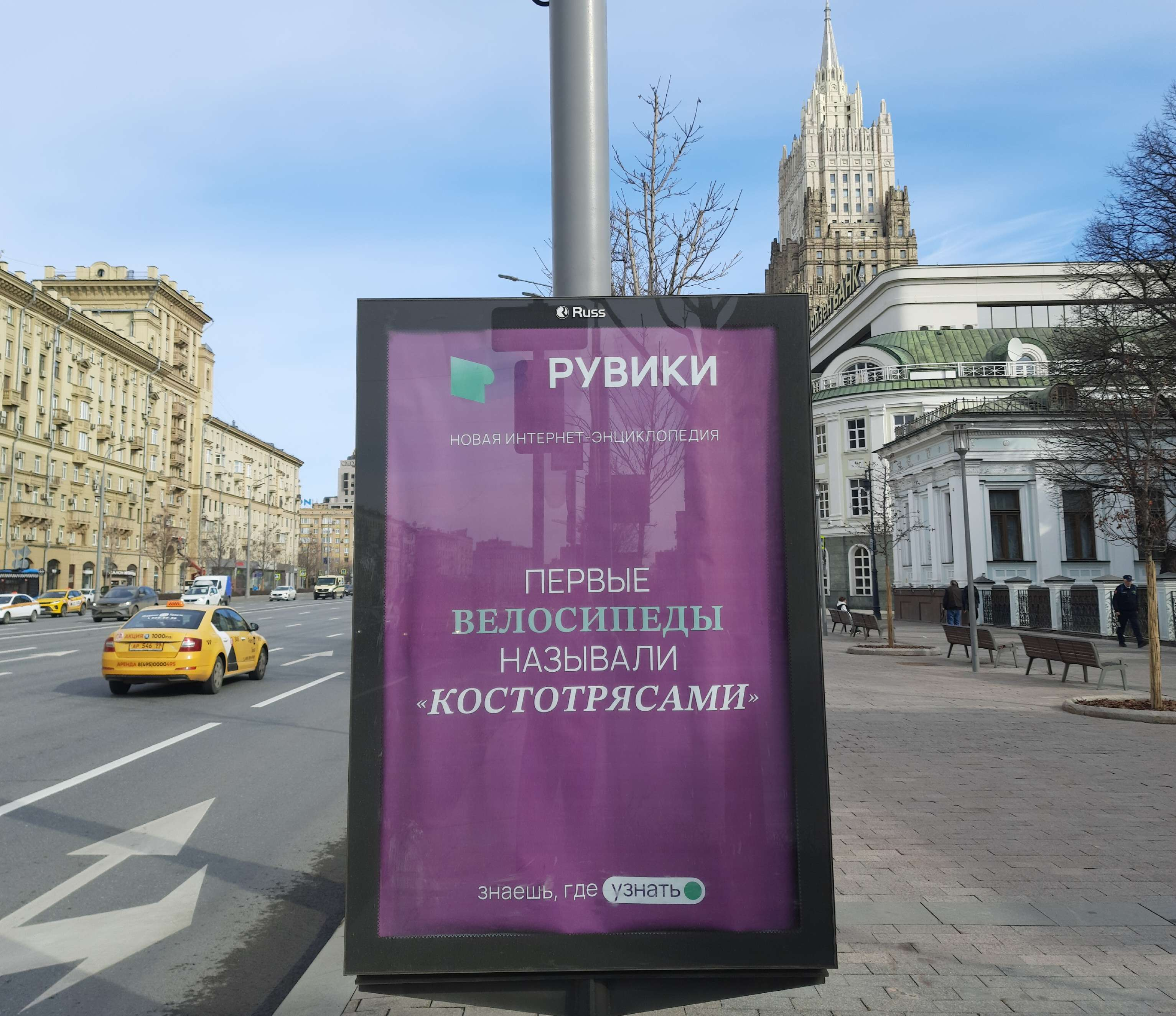
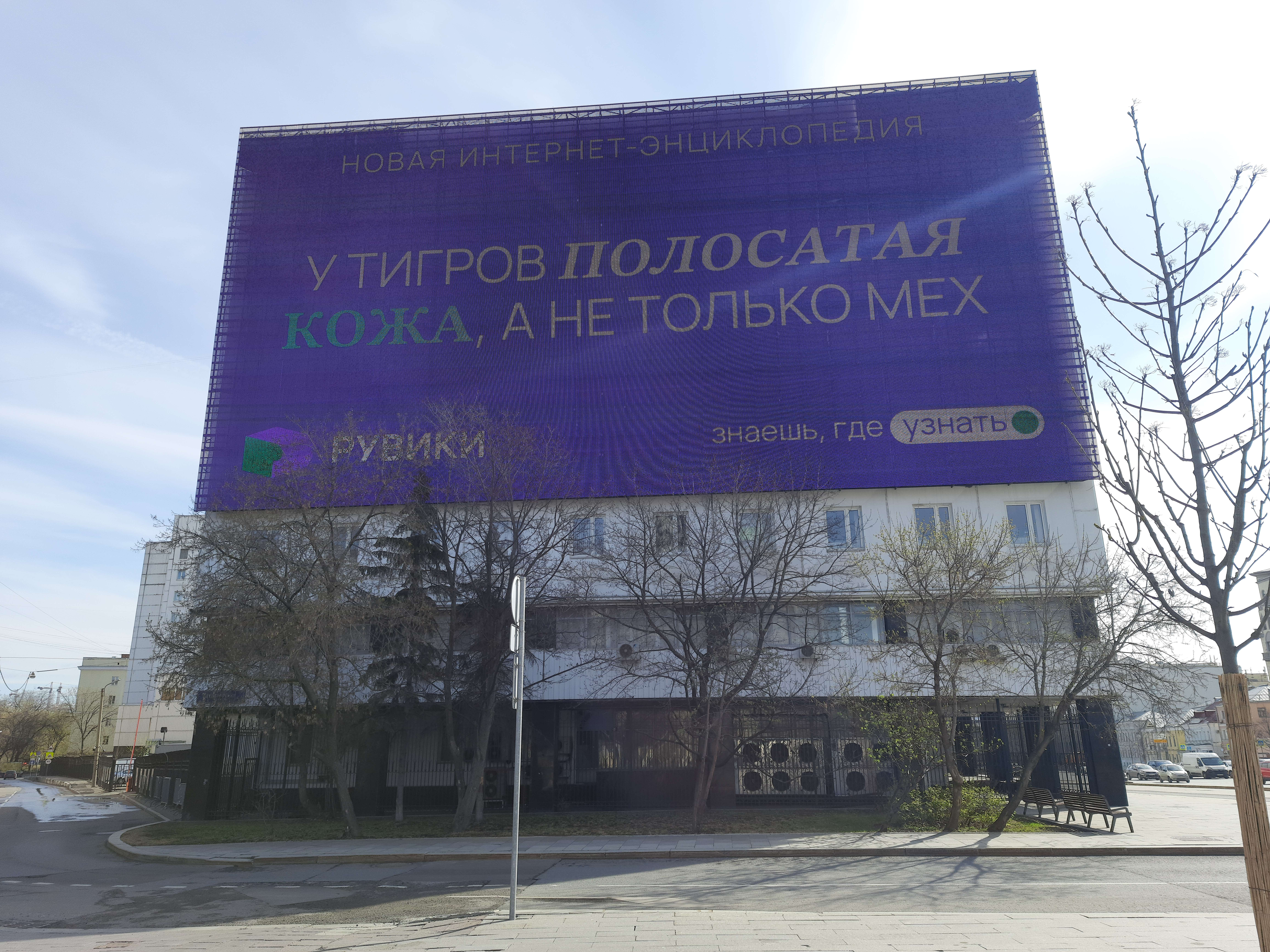
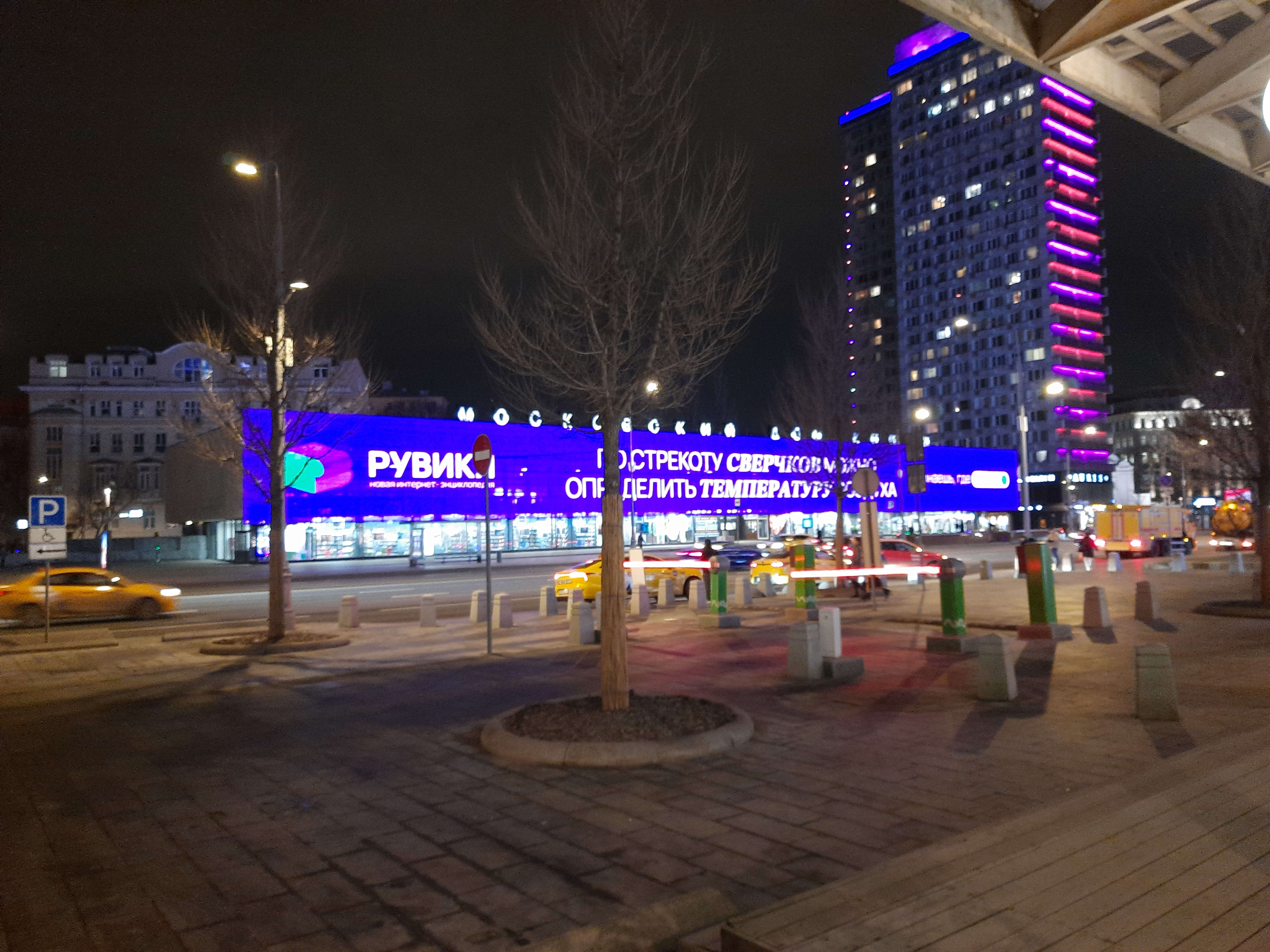
Campaigning of ruwiki in Russia, Spring 2024

In January 2024, it was reported that Ruwiki would enter full public service on Monday, 15 January. Ruwiki confirmed the statements shortly thereafter, announcing the "end of beta testing on January 15, 2024". Public launch happened on 24 June 2023, following a heavy advertisement campaign in Russia.

== Similar projects ==
There were other Russian encyclopedic projects advertised as an alternative to Wikipedia: an online portal to Great Russian Encyclopedia and a wiki (Znanie.wiki) by the Znanie Society ("Knowledge Society"), inherited from the Soviet times.

In 2026, Bloomberg reported Russian authorities initiated another project 'Russian Project 2026' with the aim of creating more Wikipedia-style sources with manipulated data, in order to influence search-engines and AI-chatbots to provide altered information.

== Censorship ==
According to Medeyko, Ruwiki is supposed to comply with both Russian legislation and the principle of presentation from a neutral point of view. It is claimed that the project does not have censorship, and the content can be devoted to any topic, as long as it does not violate the legislation of the Russian Federation. However, in the Internet community, the creation of Ruwiki was perceived as a "censored analogue of Wikipedia". It is noted that the essence of the Ruwiki concept is manifested in articles devoted to modern politics (primarily Russia's foreign policy). At the same time, the emphasis is shifted in the opposite direction from the Wikipedia articles.

=== Facts removal ===
Visualization of the most frequently added and removed sources in the RuWiki

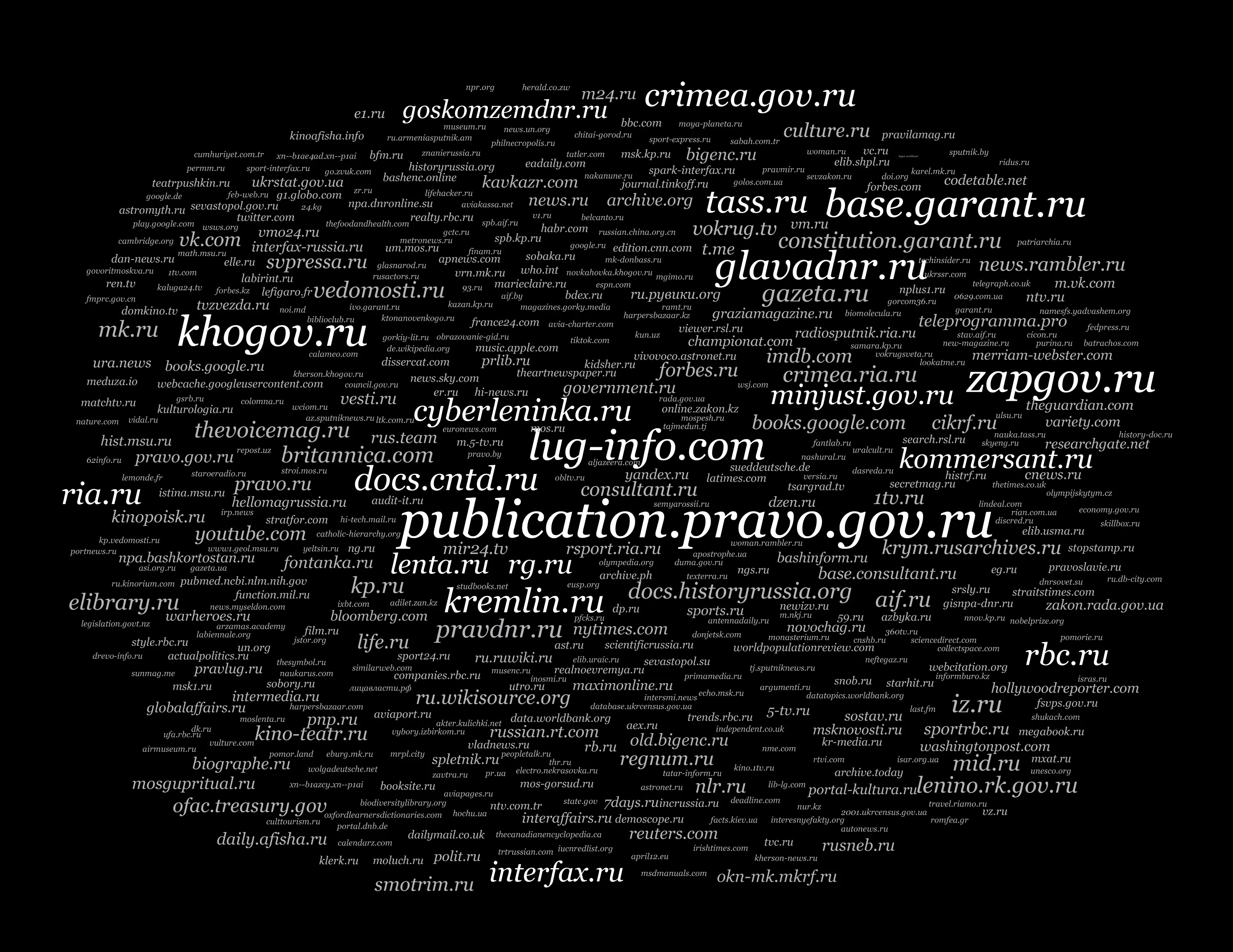
Added sources

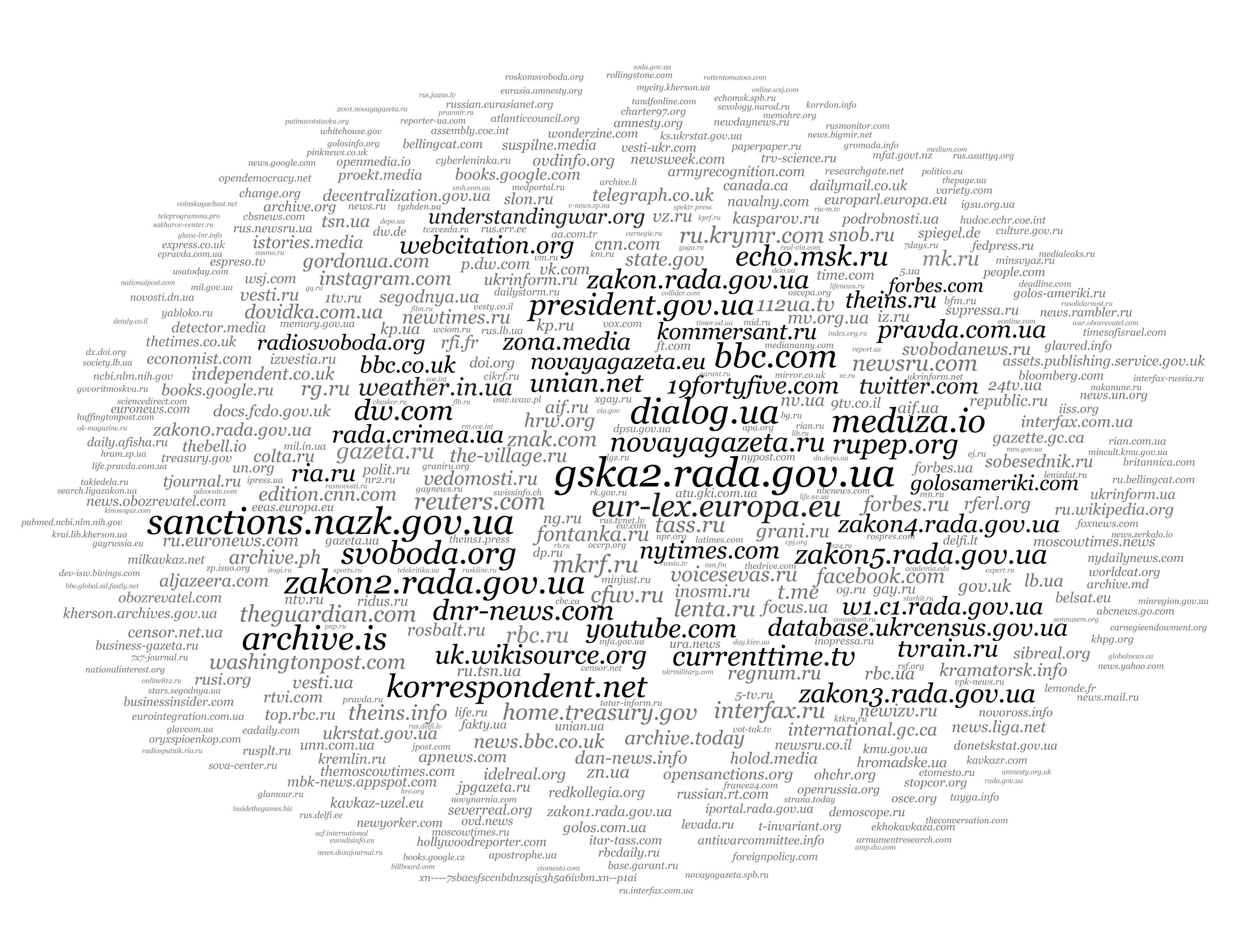
Removed sources

There is a clear focus on removing independent Russian press and Ukrainian sources and replacing them with Russian state-owned media and official state websites.

The Insider reported that Ruwiki consistently removes information that may be deemed undesirable by Russian authorities. The article "A321 crash landing near Zhukovsky", which described the incident with the landing of a civilian aircraft in a cornfield in 2019, after which Russian President Vladimir Putin awarded the crew medals was also censored. However, Ruwiki removed the subsequent criticism of the aircraft crew's actions by aviation experts. In the article about Yevgeny Prigozhin, among other things, information about Prigozhin's recruitment of Russian prisoners for the war with Ukraine was deleted. Also, the articles "human rights in Russia," "freedom of speech in Russia," "censorship in Russia," and "political prisoner" have been greatly reduced.

The Economist noticed the following:

- the article "Kherson" does not mention either the battles for the city in 2022 nor the Russian shelling after deoccupation;
- the article about the Katyn massacre of Polish officers expresses doubt about the authenticity of documents pointing at the role of the NKVD;
- all references to Alexei Navalny call him a blogger, not an oppositionist.

At some point in April 2024, tracking edits was difficult: the functionality that allows comparing two arbitrary versions of an article was excluded from the edit history. According to Alexander Sergeyev, "Ruwiki is censorship in its purest form, it's not a collective of authors, but a collective of censors to clean up Wikipedia".

Taras Tarnalitski (Тарас Тарналіцкі) reports how Ruwiki started to seriously diverge from the Russian Wikipedia in the articles related to the modern politics of Belarus, in particular, by removing facts about Alexander Lukashenko and about suppression of Belarusian protests.

=== Anti-Ukrainian propaganda ===
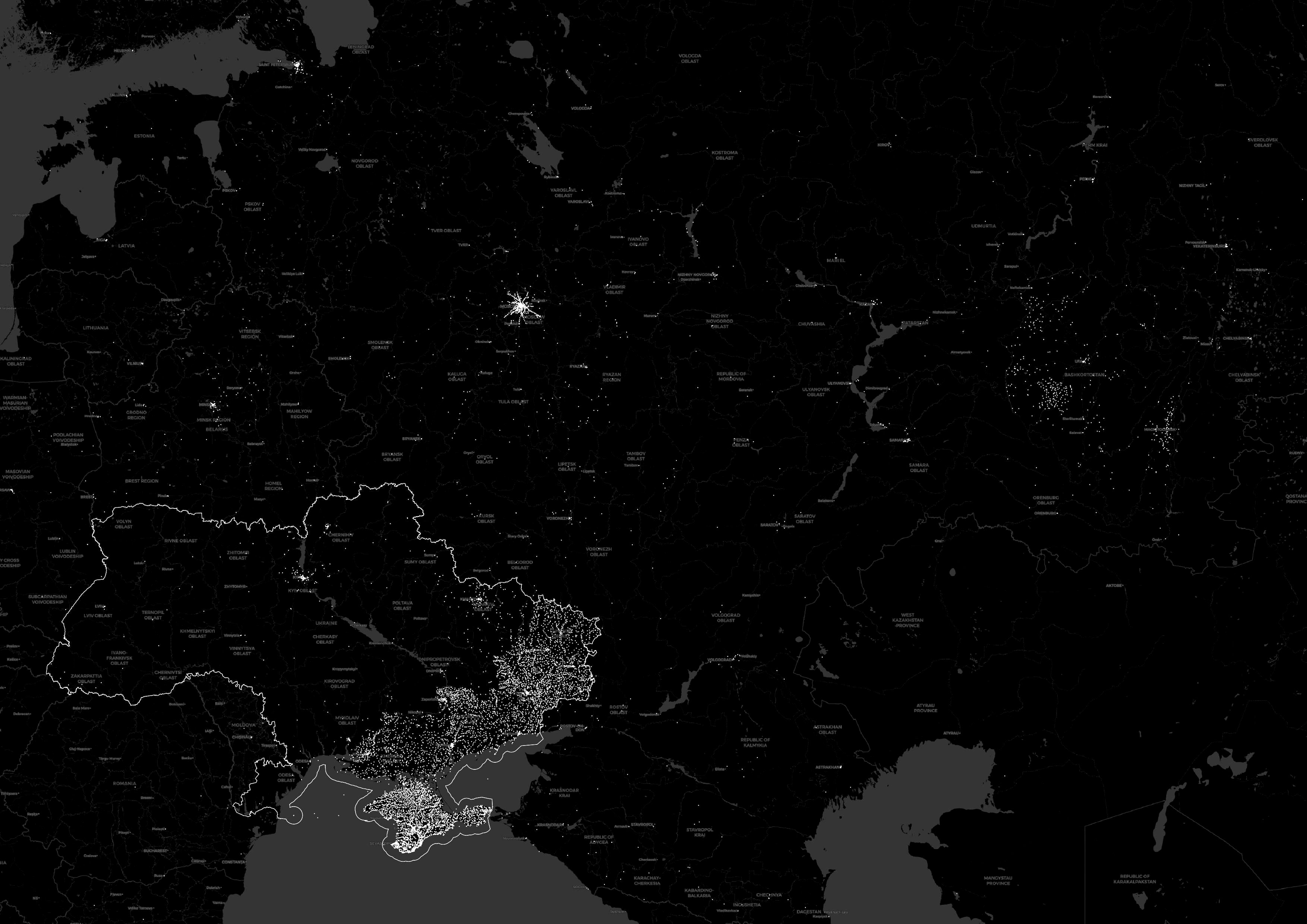
Geographical affiliation of the articles that were edited on RuWiki after being copied from the Russian Wikipedia. Most edits in articles about settlements concern the occupied territories of Ukraine.

Ruwiki has been noted for containing anti-Ukrainian propaganda.

When Ruwiki was created, articles on topics that were banned by the Russian authorities, such as the massacre in Bucha and the Ukrainian chant "Putin khuylo!", were removed from the list of articles taken from the Russian Wikipedia; as of July 2023, they are not there. The Ruwiki article about the Wagner PMC does not mention the June mutiny, and the article about Russia's invasion of Ukraine does not use the word "invasion", instead using the expression "military operation." In January 2024, Vyorstka journalists who studied an array of articles on Ruwiki found references to the Russian occupation of Ukrainian cities, the disputed status of Crimea, and links to sources recognized in Russia as "foreign agents" and "undesirable organizations" in Russia. Just a few hours after the article was published, all references to the occupation of Ukrainian territories and disputed Crimea were removed from Ruwiki's articles in the publication. The drafts of two articles with the titles "Torture, castration and murder of a prisoner of war in the Privolye sanatorium" and Putin's Palace were deleted by the administrators, one of whom had previously edited the article about the journalist Naila Asker-Zade, removing the word "propaganda" from the text and the mention of Asker-Zade's partner, the head of VTB Andrei Kostin.

The facts on certain topics, mainly related to Ukrainian politics and the Russo-Ukrainian war are presented selectively. For example, the promise in Vladimir Putin's statement about not occupying the territory of Ukraine, which was subsequently not fulfilled, is not included. Many events accompanying the military actions are not mentioned, in particular the failures of Russian plans (the offensive on Kyiv, the expansion of the border with NATO). Articles contain false information, while being illogical and internally contradictory, even the discussion pages have comments with proposal to determine in the article whether the events are "fake" or "a consequence of the actions of "Azov"".

- the Bucha massacre is called an incident;
- an article about the Neo-Nazism in Ukraine in Ruwiki claims that neo-Nazism has become part of state policy in Ukraine since 2014;
- an article about the President of Ukraine Volodymyr Zelenskyy has a section "Role in the glorification of neo-Nazism in Ukraine";
- an article about the change of power in Ukraine in February 2014 calls it unconstitutional;
- Euromaidan is called a coup d'état with a reference to the opinion of "many experts" and an article in the propaganda media RIA Novosti; however, the text of the state agency itself does not contain any references to experts;
- an article about Russia's invasion of Ukraine is almost completely rewritten using narratives of Russian propaganda, including false statements.

== See also ==
- Qiuwen Baike
- Hamichlol
- List of Wikipedia pages banned in Russia
- Blocking of Wikipedia in Russia
- Internet censorship in Russia
- Internet in Russia
- Media freedom in Russia
