= Ruwiki =

Ruwiki (Russian: Рувики, romanized: Ruviki) may refer to:

- the Russian Wikipedia, the Russian-language edition of Wikipedia, operated by the Wikimedia Foundation
- Ruwiki (Wikipedia fork), a Russian online encyclopedia created in 2023 as a fork of the Russian Wikipedia
