= Institute for Neurocognitive Research =

Russian scientific organization

- Институт нейрокогнитивных исследований
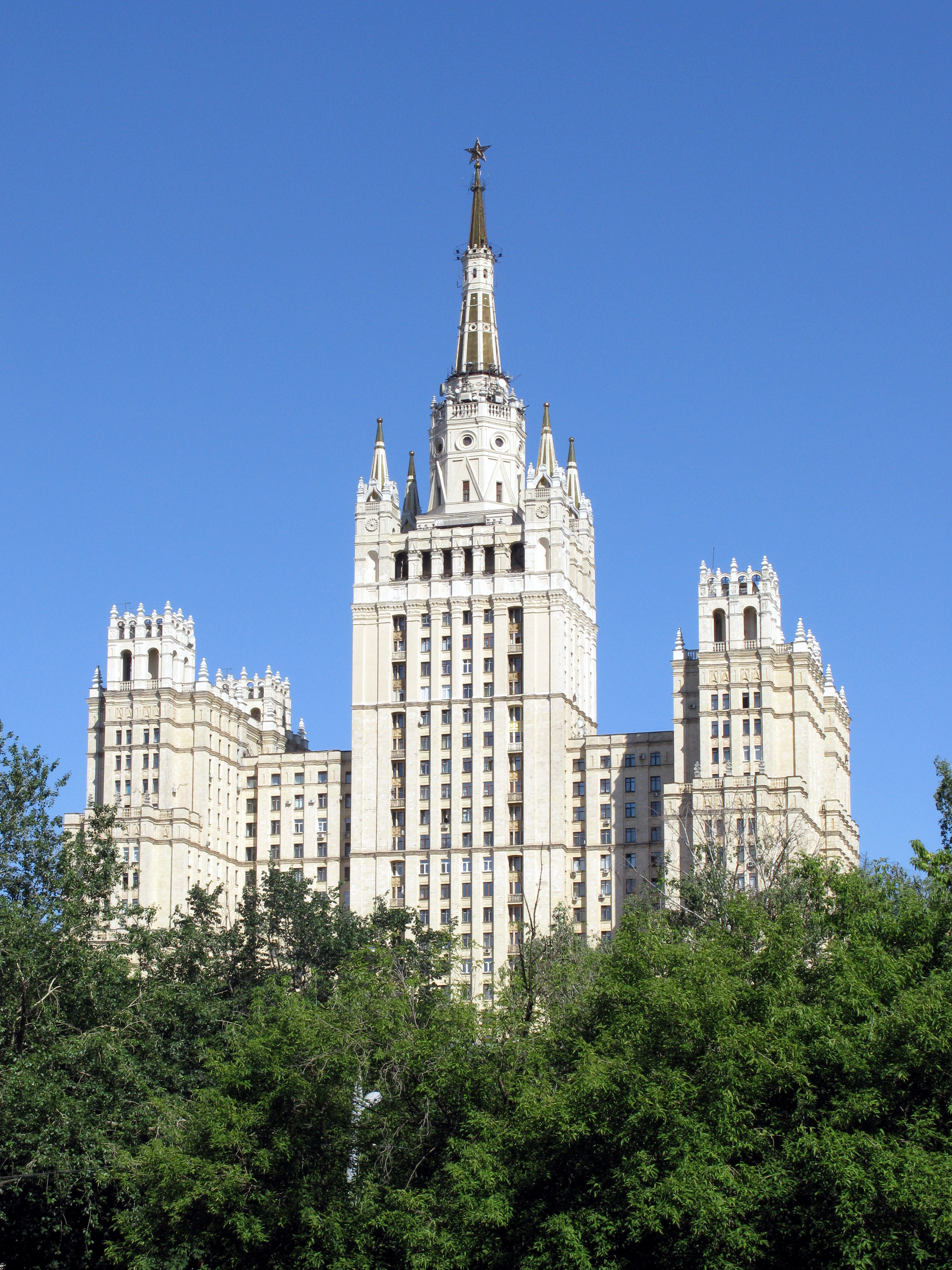
- Laboratory type: research
- Research type: theoretical and applied
- Field of research: Cognitive neuroscience
- Director: Stanislav Kozlovsky (acting)
- Location: Kudrinskaya Square, 1, 5А, Moscow, Russia; 55°45′32″N 37°34′50″E

The Institute for Neurocognitive Research (INCR; Russian: Институт нейрокогнитивных исследований; ИНКИС) is a scientific organization engaged in modern research in the fields of cognitive neuroscience, psychophysiology, and neuropsychology. It is located in Moscow at Kudrinskaya Square Building.

== History ==
The Institute was founded by Russian scientist Stanislav Kozlovsky, prominent researcher, studied under Russian Academy of Education Academician and American Academy of Arts and Sciences member Eugene Sokolov, and RAS Corresponding Member Boris Velichkovsky. Before founding the Institute, Kozlovsky worked for over 20 years in the Department of Psychophysiology at Lomonosov Moscow State University, where he conducted research and taught core courses in neuroscience, including psychophysiology, the physiology of sensory systems, tomographic methods, artificial intelligence in psychology, and methods of data processing and analysis.

Since its inception, the organization has sought to advance the understanding of cognitive processes and the neural mechanisms underlying them. During this time, the Institute has contributed to numerous studies and established itself as an important research center in Russia.

In recent years, the Institute has begun to expand its research initiatives, focusing on new technologies in neuroscience, such as novel neuroimaging methods and the application of artificial intelligence in cognitive research. However, in 2024, the Institute for Neurocognitive Research was recognized as a “foreign agent” by the Russian Ministry of Justice, which led to the suspension of its activities and the interruption of many studies.

== Research Areas ==
The Institute focuses on several key areas within cognitive neuroscience, including but not limited to:

- Neural mechanisms of memory: Studies of working and long-term memory, brain mechanisms of recognition, retention, processing, retrieval, and forgetting of information, as well as physiological processes in the brain associated with memory disorders (hypomnesia, hypermnesia, and paramnesia).
- Mechanisms of perception: The main emphasis is on studying the brain mechanisms of human visual perception. The functional role of several areas of the visual cortex is examined, especially the areas of the associative cortex. Studies are conducted on the formation and functioning of both feature-detecting neurons and gnostic neurons that respond to complex visual stimuli and scenes.
- Development of new methods for neuroimaging and processing neurophysiological data.
- Studies on the use of artificial intelligence in neurocognitive research, as well as leveraging knowledge about cognitive processes and human brain function to develop new algorithms for large language models.

== Notable employees ==
- Stanislav Kozlovsky, a prominent researcher known for his work in the field of cognitive neuroscience related to memory and visual perception.
