= Hamichlol =

Internet encyclopedia for Haredi Jews

- Logo

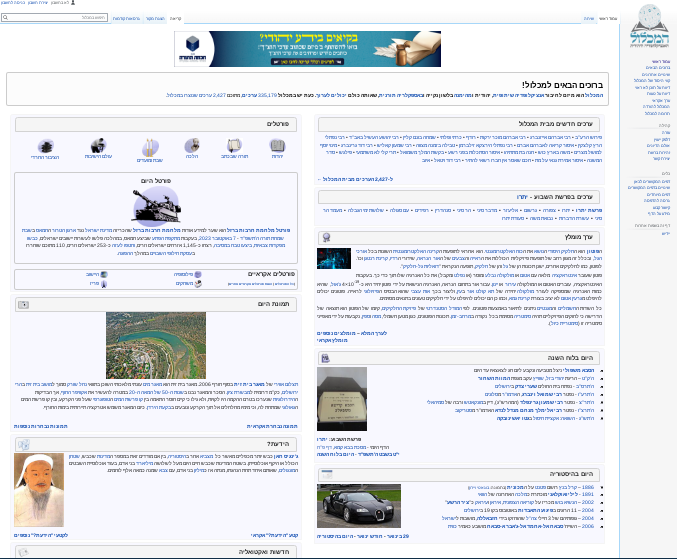
- Screenshot Desktop homepage
- Website type: censored wiki-based Internet encyclopedia project for the Haredi public
- Available in: Hebrew
- Owners: Institute for Literacy and Proper Knowledge
- Website: hamichlol.org.il
- Commercial: No
- Registration: Required to edit articles
- Launched: 11 January 2015; 11 years ago
- Content licence: Creative Commons Attribution-ShareAlike 3.0

Hamichlol (Hebrew: המכלול, lit. 'The Entirety') is a censored wiki-based Internet encyclopedia project for the Haredi public. Most of the articles on the site are exact copies (as of the date they were copied) of articles from the Hebrew Wikipedia or re-edited versions of Hebrew Wikipedia articles, adapted for the Haredi reader, while original articles currently constitute only a small portion of all the articles on the site. The site is managed and operated by the Institute for Literacy and Proper Knowledge, which was established for the purpose of creating the site.

The editor community of the site censors mainly any mentioning of homosexuality, information that contradicts a creationist worldview, and behaviors deemed immodest. The site is referred to by the site owners as an aspeklaria (אספקלריה, 'mirror'), as it is a re-edited edition of the Hebrew Wikipedia.

Hamichlol was launched on 11 January 2015. As of 31 May 2026 the site contained 376,120 articles, 3,203 of which were original created on the site. Many of the site's articles, such as the one on God, are being edited and reviewed for compliance with Talmudic law.

As of 2 October 2020 the site's Alexa's ranking was 222 in Israel.

== Background ==
In 2014 the Israeli Hasidic rabbi Yosef Kaminer founded the Institute for Literacy and Proper Knowledge (Hebrew: המכון לאוריינות וידע כהלכה) through which the site would be produced. The institute also created another website, Shitufta, a Torah repository and platform for publishing hiddushim. The site is intended for the Haredi public who are very conservative and refrain from using Wikipedia's content according to their stringent interpretations of halakha. Hamichlol aspires to be "the largest Jewish encyclopedia in history, which includes articles on all issues pertaining to the Torah, Jewish values and the history of the Jewish people, but also knowledge pertaining to mankind and from all the secular" (Hebrew: חולין [transliteration: hulin]) "fields–written in clean language according to the Jewish worldview."

== Operation ==
Originally, the site imported the entire Hebrew Wikipedia and re-edited or deleted the content which they considered not proper for the Torah-observant public, and specifically Haredi readers. The content is imported from the Hebrew Wikipedia in accordance with Wikipedia's free license, which enables editors to perform such a "split". Because many Haredi avoid pictures of women, some images are edited to remove women, including historical pictures or group photos (for example, a photo of the thirty-fourth government of Israel's cabinet).

The owners of the website state that in the instances in which imported articles from Wikipedia contain content deemed problematic, the editorial team of the website will gradually review the articles to determine whether the content is appropriate: problematic articles which also contain proper content will be rewritten, while the articles with totally inappropriate content will eventually be permanently deleted.

== Copyrights ==
All content on the site which was originally imported from Wikipedia is provided under the free license CC BY-SA. The copyrights of the rest of the site's content is reserved to the Institute for Literacy and Proper Knowledge.

== See also ==
- Baidu Baike—Chinese online encyclopedia censored per government requirements
- Conservapedia
- Enciclopedia Libre Universal en Español
- Haredi Judaism § Newspapers and publications
- Jewish views on evolution § Orthodox scientists respond to Darwin
- List of online encyclopedias
- Qiuwen Baike
- Ruwiki (Wikipedia fork)
