= Block of Wikipedia in Russia =

Censorship of Wikipedia articles in Russia since 2015

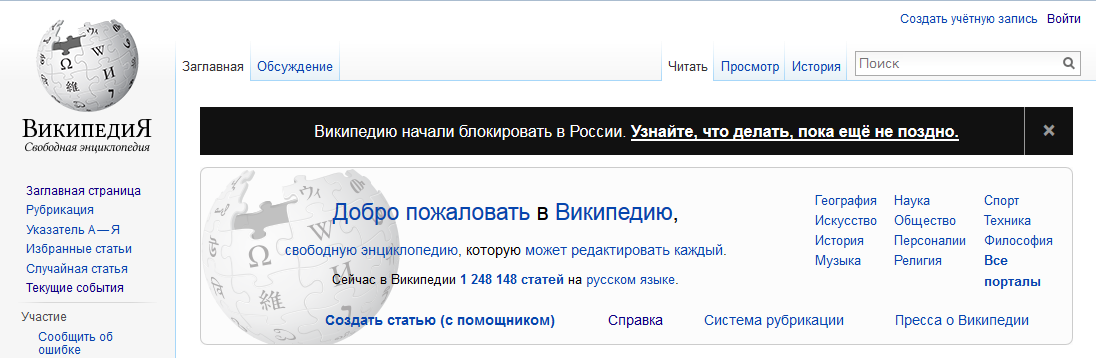
Banner on Russian Wikipedia, 24 and 25 August 2015 Wikipedia has started to be blocked in Russia. Find out what to do before it's too late.

The free online encyclopedia Wikipedia was briefly blocked in Russia in August 2015. Some articles from Wikipedia were included in various censorship lists disseminated by the government. Further threats to block were made following the Russian invasion of Ukraine.

== 2015 blocking ==
On 28 July 2012, Russian president Vladimir Putin signed Federal Law No. 139-FZ "On Amending the Federal Law on the Protection of Children from Information Harmful to their Health and Development and certain legislative acts of the Russian Federation". This law introduced a number of provisions involving the blocking of Internet sites on the blacklist system and prohibited Internet resources. A number of experts expressed concerns that this law could be used to enable internet censorship.

On 1 November 2012, the provisions concerning a unified register of domain names and URLs containing prohibited information came into force. A Unified Register of Prohibited Sites was created.

Within three years of the adoption of the law, more than 25 Russian Wikipedia articles, mainly about drugs and suicide, entered the Unified Register of Prohibited Sites. Most of these articles, after some time, were removed from the register. However, on 24 August 2015, there was a short blocking of Wikipedia in Russia.

== 2022 threat to block ==
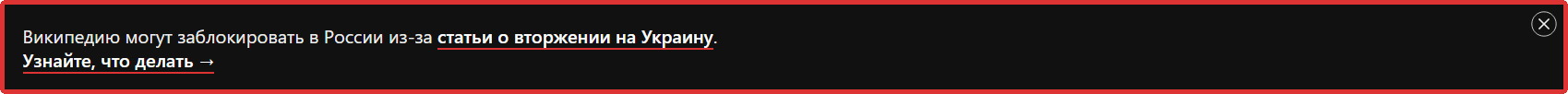
Banner used in March 2022 Wikipedia may be blocked in Russia over an article about the invasion of Ukraine. Find out what to do →

On 1 March 2022, Roskomnadzor, the Russian agency for monitoring and censoring mass media, wrote to the Wikimedia Foundation asking for the removal of the article "Вторжение России на Украину (2022)" ('Russian invasion of Ukraine') on the United States-hosted Russian Wikipedia. The agency threatened to block access to the site, claiming that the article contained "illegally distributed information" including "reports about numerous casualties among service personnel of the Russian Federation and also the civilian population of Ukraine, including children".

On 11 March 2022, a Russian Wikipedia editor based in Minsk, Belarus, Mark Bernstein, was detained by the Belarusian security service GUBOPiK after he was accused online of violating the 2022 Russian fake news law for his edits on articles covering the Russian invasion of Ukraine.

On 16 March 2022, the Russian Agency of Legal and Judicial Information (a news agency founded by the RIA Novosti, the Constitutional Court of Russia, the Supreme Court of Russia, and the High Court of Arbitration of Russia in 2009) published an interview of Alexander Malkevich, the deputy chairman of the commission on the development of information society, media and mass communications of the Civic Chamber of the Russian Federation. In this interview, Malkevich said that Wikipedia (both Russian and others) was becoming a "bridgehead for informational war against Russia". He also stated that Russian law-enforcement agencies had identified thirteen persons who were carrying out "politically engaged editing" Wikipedia's articles, and about 30,000 bloggers "participating in informational war against Russia".

According to Novaya Gazeta, pro-Kremlin structures related to Yevgeny Prigozhin are actively involved in doxing "coordinators of an informational attack on Russia", including Wikipedia editors. Novaya Gazeta also reports that Special Communications Service of Russia (a division of the Federal Protective Service) employees are trying to disseminate pro-Kremlin propaganda by editing Wikipedia articles.

On 18 May 2022, Roskomnadzor demanded to remove articles about the 2022 Russian invasion of Ukraine and the term "Rashism" from the English Wikipedia.

On 31 March 2022, Russian media censorship agency Roskomnadzor threatened to fine Wikimedia up to 4 million rubles (about US$49,000) if it did not delete information about the 2022 Russian invasion of Ukraine that is "misinforming" Russians.

In April–May 2022, the Russian authorities put several Wikipedia articles on their list of forbidden sites. The list included the articles on the 2022 Russian invasion of Ukraine and Rashism, several articles on Russian Wikipedia devoted to military action and war crimes during the Russo-Ukrainian War, and two sections of the Russian article about Vladimir Putin.

On 20 July, due to the refusal of Wikipedia to remove the articles about the Russo-Ukrainian war, Roskomnadzor ordered search engines to mark Wikipedia as a violator of Russian laws.

== See also ==
- List of Wikipedia pages banned in Russia
- Detention of Pavel Pernikaŭ
- Blocking of Telegram in Russia
- Censorship of Wikipedia
- Pierre-sur-Haute military radio station
