= Wikimedia RU =

Local Wikimedia Сhapter in Russia

VA Wikimedia RU
- Founded: 2008
- Defunct: 2023
- Type: non-profit voluntary association
- Location: Russia 125009, Moscow, Vozdvizhenka Street, 10, 3rd floor, office 350
- Key people: Stanislav Kozlovsky
- Website: wikimedia.ru

Wikimedia RU (Russian: Викимедиа РУ), also known as Wikimedia Russia, was a non-profit Wikimedia chapter created to support the creation and maintenance of articles in the Russian-language Wikipedia.

== History ==
The idea to create a non-profit organization promoting the development of the Internet encyclopedia Wikipedia on the territory of the Russian Federation appeared as early as 2005, but active preparations began only in the fall of 2007. According to the current legislation, all members of the non-profit partnership are Russian citizens.

On May 24, 2008, the prepared founding documents were approved by the Board of Trustees of the Wikimedia Foundation as one of the regional Wikimedia organizations (so-called "chapters" or "Local chapters") - this date is considered by Wikimedia projects as the date of foundation of the Russian organization. The details of the non-profit partnership's relationship with the Foundation are governed by separately signed agreements.

On November 21, 2008, Wikimedia RU was entered into the register of registered non-profit organizations, which marked the end of the legal registration procedure.

As of 2022, the director of Wikimedia Russia was Vladimir Medeyko.

Following increasing attacks on its members by the Russian government under Vladimir Putin, Wikimedia Russia was shut down in 2023.

Bloomberg has speculated that this may be a move toward replacing the Russian Wikipedia in Russia with Ruwiki, a Wikipedia fork seen as being more sympathetic to the Russian government's propaganda aims.

On March 22, 2024, Wikimedia RU was declared a foreign agent.

== Awards ==
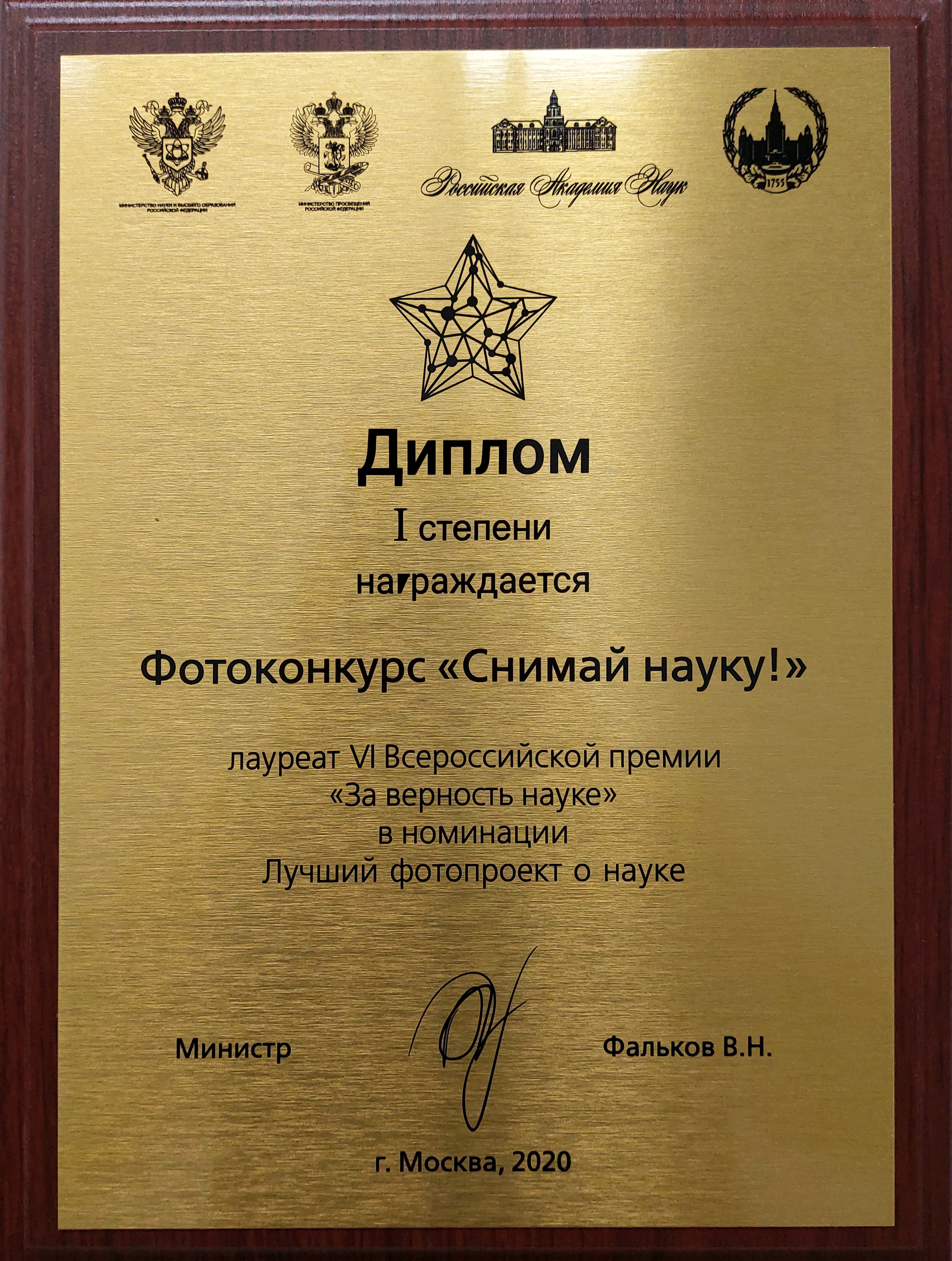
Photo of the "For Fidelity to Science" award diploma for the "Shoot Science" science photography contest

The partnership's office holds signs of awards given in Russia to Wikimedia projects (primarily Wikipedia):

- In 2006, 2007, 2009, 2010, 2012, 2014 the organization was awarded the Runet award.
- WMRU won at least one Golden Site Award.
- Wikimedia RU member Farhad Fatkullin was honored as Wikimedian of the Year in 2018.
- The science photo contest "Shoot Science", organized annually by Wikimedia RU in cooperation with the TV channel "Nauka", was twice (in 2017 and 2019) awarded the prize "For Fidelity to Science" of the Ministry of Education and Science.

== Notable people ==
- Vladimir Medeyko - served as a director from its founding in 2008 until May 2023, after which he moved to Ruwiki.
- Stanislav Kozlovsky - co-founder and last director of the chapter
