= Russian Wikipedia =

Russian-language edition of Wikipedia

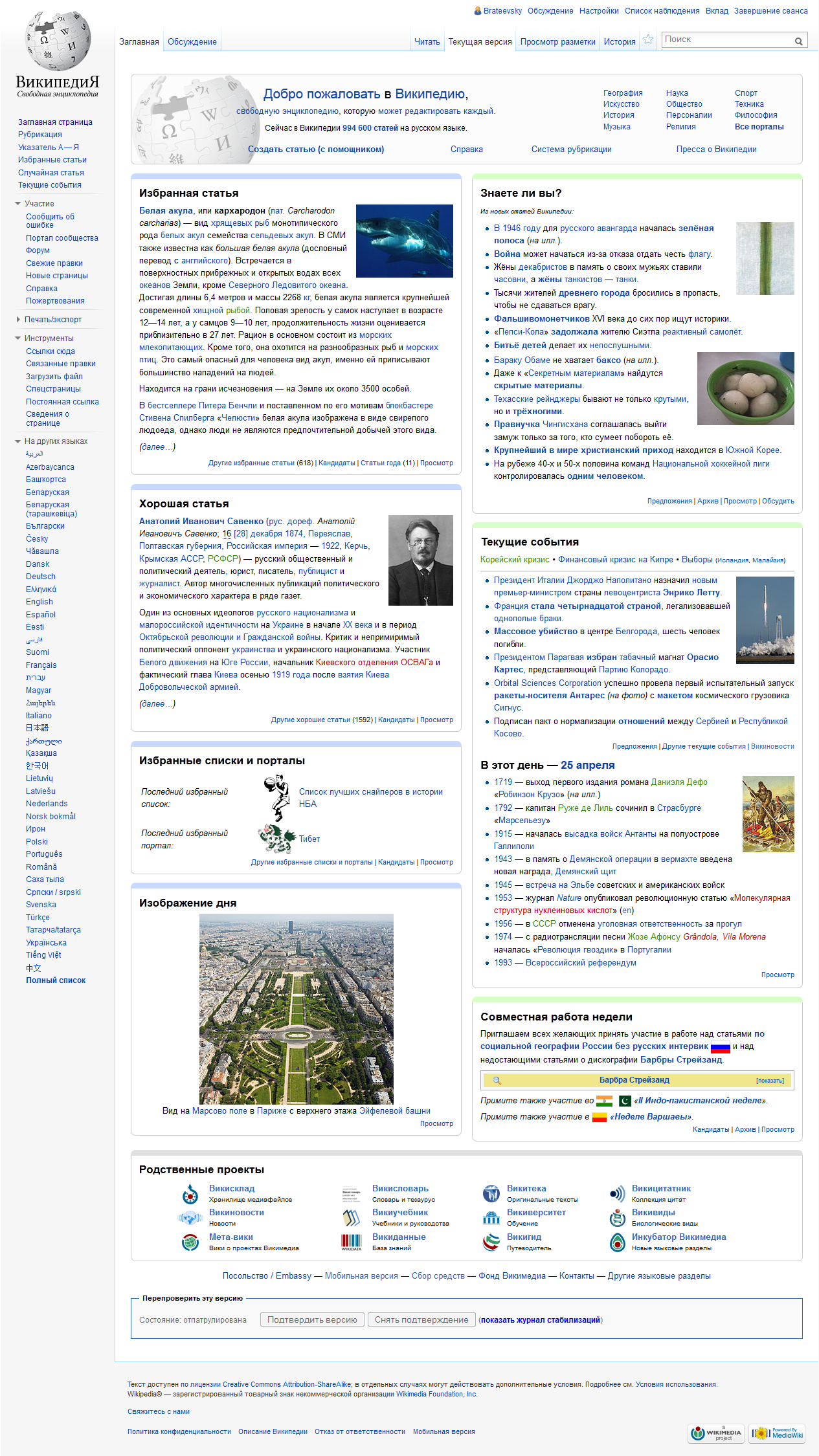
- Screenshot Main Page of the Russian Wikipedia in April 2013.
- Website type: Internet encyclopedia project
- Available in: Russian
- Owner: Wikimedia Foundation
- Website: ru.wikipedia.org
- Commercial: Charitable
- Registration: Optional
- Users: 4.09 million (as of 19 September 2026)
- Launched: 20 May 2001; 25 years ago
- Content license: Creative Commons Attribution/ Share-Alike 4.0 (most text also dual-licensed under GFDL); Media licensing varies

The Russian Wikipedia (Russian: Русская Википедия, romanized: Russkaya Vikipediya) is the Russian-language edition of Wikipedia. As of September 2026, it has 2,118,472 articles. It was started on 11 May 2001. In October 2015, it became the sixth-largest Wikipedia by the number of articles. It has the sixth-largest number of edits (155 million). In June 2020, it was the world's sixth most visited language Wikipedia (after the English, the Japanese, the Spanish, the German and the French Wikipedias). As of November 2024, it is the third most viewed Wikipedia, after the English and Japanese editions.

It is the largest Wikipedia written in any Slavic language, surpassing the Polish Wikipedia by 20% in terms of the number of articles and fivefold by the parameter of depth. In addition, the Russian Wikipedia is the largest Wikipedia written in Cyrillic or in a script other than the Latin script. In April 2016, the project had 3,377 active editors who made at least five contributions in that month, ranking third behind the English and Spanish versions. As of 2024, it is the most popular Wikipedia in many post-Soviet states, including Russia, Ukraine, Belarus, Moldova, Kazakhstan, Kyrgyzstan, Tajikistan, and Turkmenistan, and the second most popular in others.

Since the early 2010s, the Russian Wikipedia and its contributing editors have experienced numerous and increasing threats of nationwide blocks and country-wide enforcement of blacklisting by the Russian government, as well as several attempts at Internet censorship, propaganda, and disinformation, more recently during the 2014 Russo-Ukrainian war in the Donbas region and the Russian invasion of Ukraine.

== Policies ==
Difficult issues are resolved through the Arbitration Committee, which handles content disputes, blocks users or prohibits certain users from editing articles on certain topics.

Administrators (currently 63) are elected through a vote; a minimum quorum of 30 voters and 66% of support votes are required if the request is to be considered successful. Administrators who have become inactive (i.e. have not used administrative tools, such as "delete" or "block" buttons, at least 25 times in six months) may lose their privileges by an Arbitration Committee decision.

== Content ==
As of 2024, some of the biggest categories (which contain more than 5,000 articles) in the Russian Wikipedia are:

- 176,411 biographical articles. Although the Western name order (given name(s) followed by family name) is generally used in Russian, the Russian Wikipedia uses lexical order (last name, comma, given name(s) and also the patronymic for most people from ex-Soviet countries) for all articles on non-fictional persons. This order has been traditionally used in major Russian-language encyclopedias, like the Great Soviet Encyclopedia.
- 144,322 human settlements articles.
- 28,187 river articles
- 19,302 film articles
- 16,925 animal articles
- 16,517 scientific articles
- 16,133 surname articles
- 13,936 footballers' articles
- 11,247 Musicians' articles
- 10,755 Writers' articles
- 9,243 album articles
- 9,237 articles on recipients of the Order of Lenin
- 7,307 Company's articles
- 6,734 plant articles
- 6,574 street articles
- 6,265 NGC astronomical articles
- 6,157 actors articles
- 5,719 artist articles
- 5,580 music group articles
- 5,292 Hero of the Soviet Union articles

10,340 articles contain material from the Brockhaus and Efron Encyclopedic Dictionary. More than 47,000 articles were translated from the English Wikipedia.

=== Namespaces ===
In addition to common Wikipedia namespaces, the Russian Wikipedia has three custom ones: "Incubator" (Инкубатор, #102–103) – which is used as a training camp for new users and their first articles, "Project" (Проект, #104–105) – for Wikipedia projects and "Arbitration" (# 106–107) – for arbitration requests.

=== User pages ===
On user pages, users are able to see their outreach, the cumulative view count of pages they have edited.

== Reception ==
In a 2015 interview, Roman Leibov, a professor at the University of Tartu, stated that articles on the humanities in the Russian Wikipedia were significantly inferior in quality to those in the English edition, and some of the articles had deteriorated with time. He attributed this to what he characterized as the Russian Wikipedia community's overly strict enforcement of intellectual property regulations, as well as to the inadequate editorial proficiency of some contributors.

In 2022, the San Francisco Examiner praised the Russian Wikipedia for "filling the information vacuum" while "independent media abandon Russia or are censored" during the 2022 Russian invasion of Ukraine. For the safety of Wikipedians, all editors' names in the page about the Russian invasion in Ukraine are routinely erased.

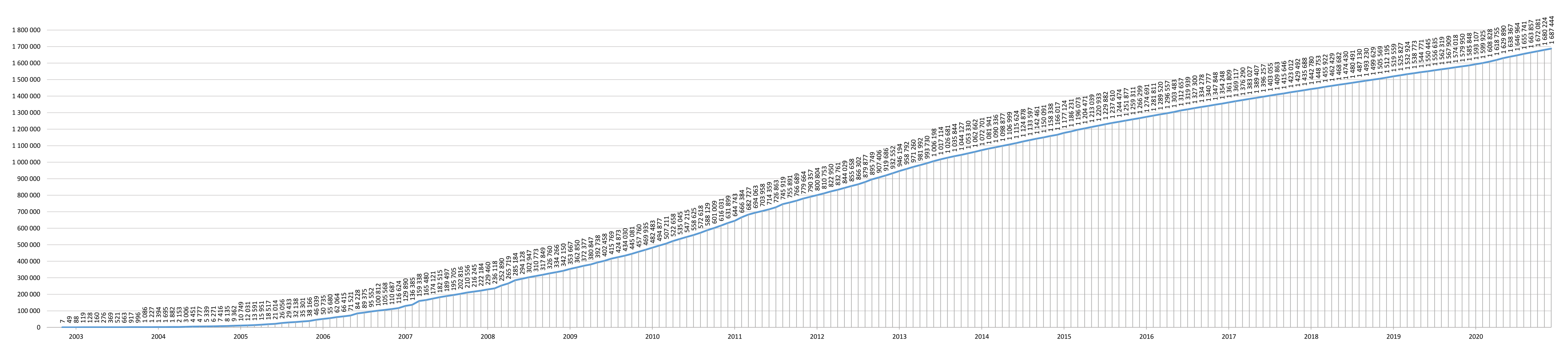
Number of Russian Wikipedia articles in 2005–2020

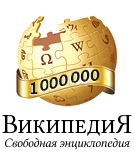
Russian Wikipedia logo on 11 May 2013

Russian Wikipedia logo on 1 October 2018

== History ==
=== Early years ===
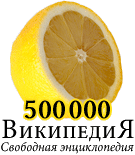
Celebration logo for 500.000 articles is a pun, as "half a lemon" means "half a million" in Russian slang.

The Russian Wikipedia was created on 20 May 2001 in the first wave of non-English Wikipedias, along with editions in Catalan, Chinese, Dutch, German, Esperanto, French, Hebrew, Italian, Japanese, Portuguese, Spanish, and Swedish.

The countries in which the Russian Wikipedia is the most popular language version of Wikipedia are shown in light blue.

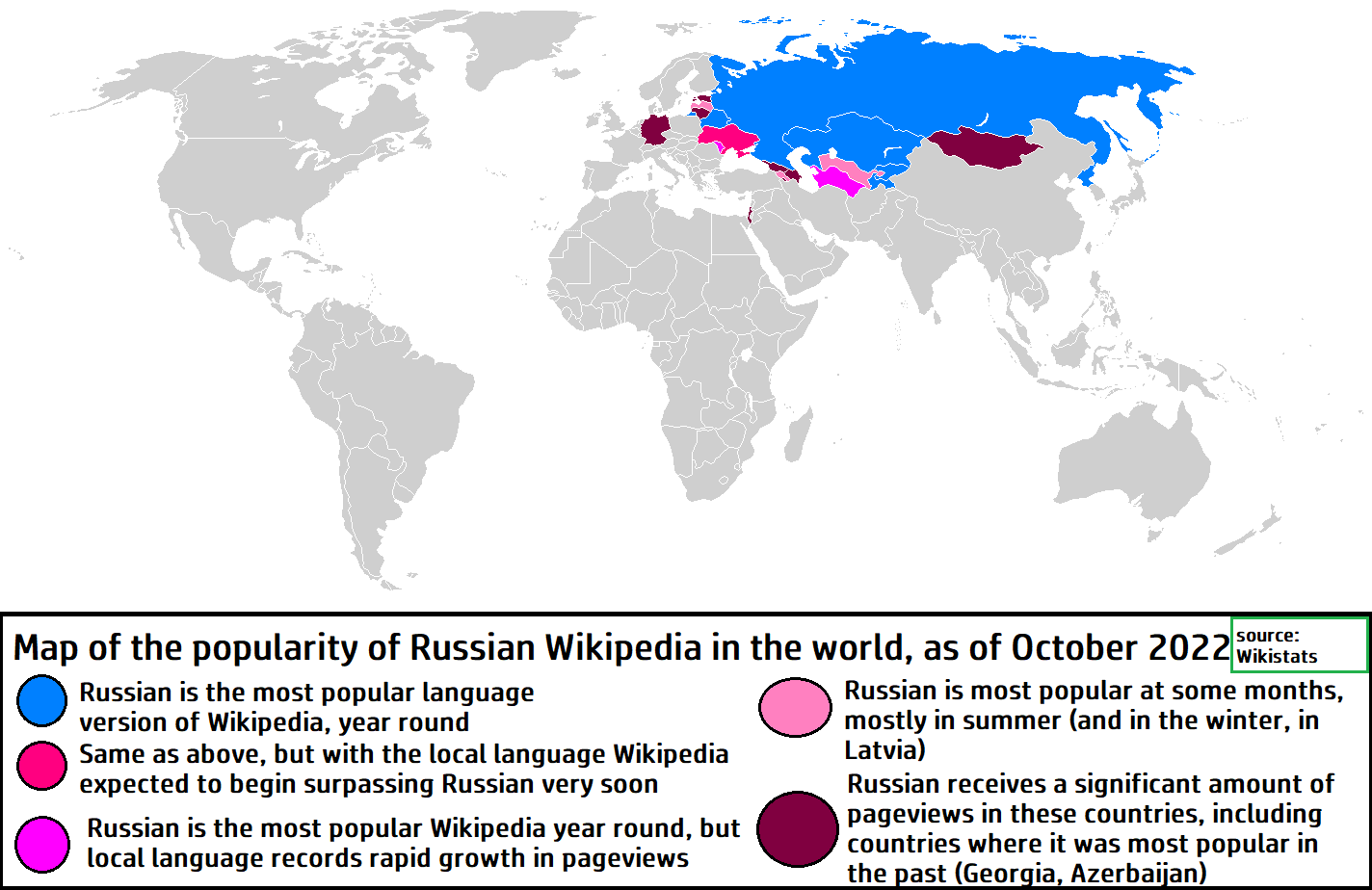
The countries where Russian Wikipedia is the most popular in October 2022, together with a sorting of the countries on how stable is the lead of Russian Wikipedia there

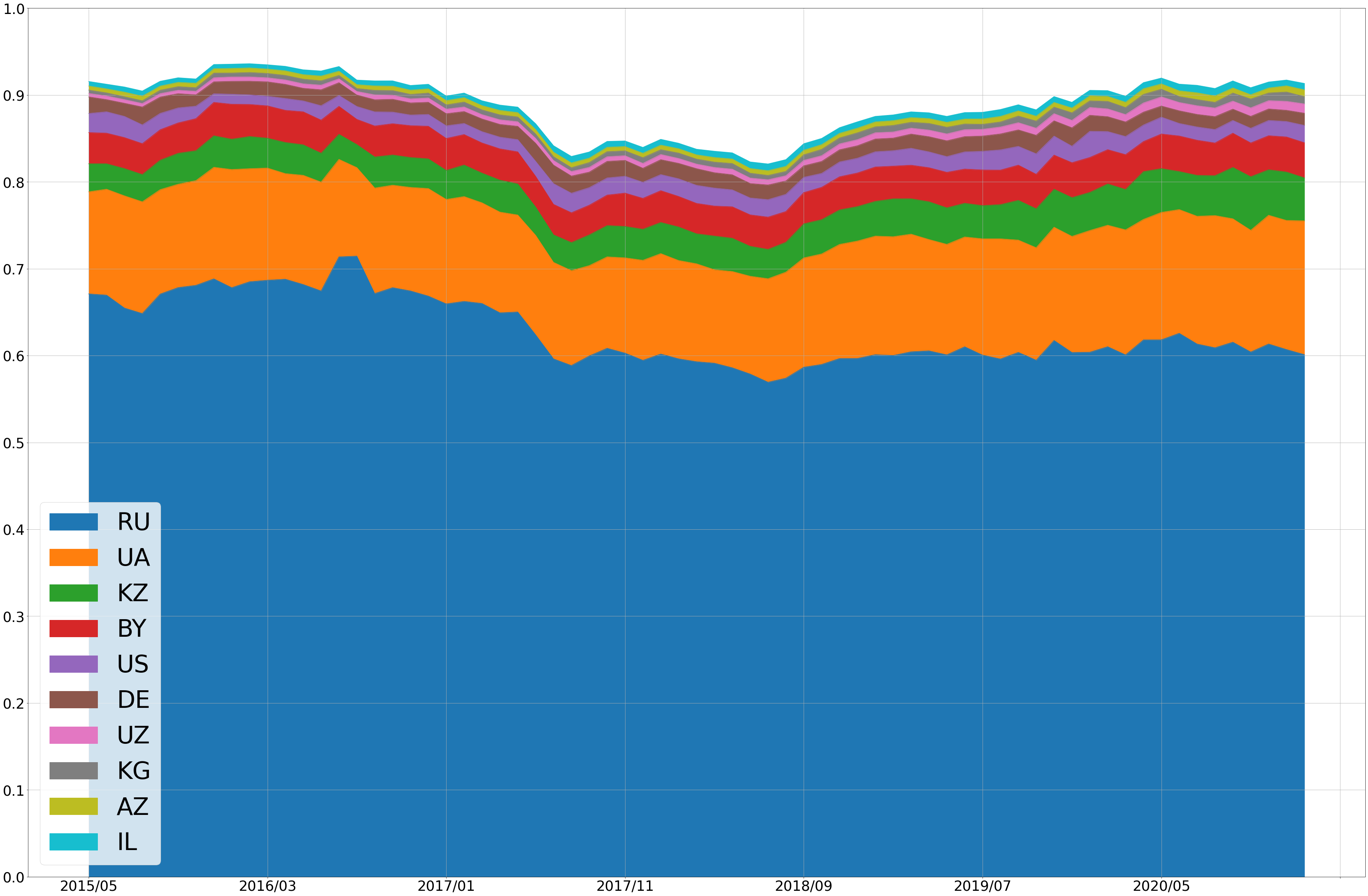
Origin of viewers over time on the Russian Wikipedia

The first edit of the Russian Wikipedia was on 24 May 2001, and consisted of the line "Россия – великая страна" ("Russia is a great nation"). The following edit changed it to the joke: "Россия – родина слонов (ушастых, повышенной проходимости – см. мамонт)" ("Russia is the motherland of elephants (big-eared, improved cross-country capability, see Mammoth.")

For a long time development was slow (especially after some participants left for WikiZnanie), but in the 12-month period between February 2005 and February 2006 it surpassed nine editions in other languages – the Catalan, Bulgarian, Ukrainian, Hebrew, Finnish, Norwegian, Chinese, Esperanto, and Danish Wikipedias. In 2006, 2007, 2009 and 2010 the Russian Wikipedia won the "Science and education" category of the "Runet Prize" (Russian: Премия Рунета) award, supervised by the Russian government agency FAPMC.

=== Troubles with the Russian government ===
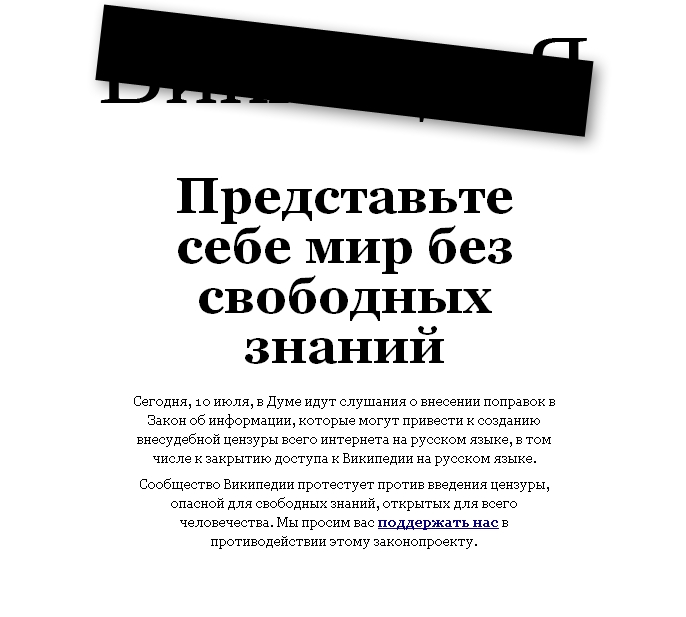
Russian Wikipedia Main Page during 10 July 2012 blackout. "Imagine a world without free knowledge" written.

On 10 July 2012, Russian Wikipedia closed access to its content for 24 hours in protest against proposed amendments to Russia's Information Act (Bill No. 89417-6) regulating the accessibility of Internet-based information to children. Among other things, the bill stipulates the creation and country-wide enforcement of blacklists, which would block access to forbidden sites. Several aspects of this amendment drew criticism from various civil rights activists and Internet providers.

Supporters of the amendment stated that it is aimed only at widely prohibited content such as child pornography and similar information, but the Russian Wikimedia chapter has declared that conditions for determining the content falling under this law will create a thing like the "great Chinese firewall". They further claimed that existing Russian legal practice demonstrates a high likelihood of a worst-case scenario, resulting in a country-wide ban of Wikipedia. The second and the third readings of the law were held in the State Duma on 11 July; no essential corrections were introduced. The law will come into force after three readings in the State Duma, one reading in the Federation Council and presidential approval.

On 10 July, Nikolai Nikiforov, Russian Minister for Telecommunications and Mass Media announced in his Twitter account, that the organization of the List of the prohibited websites (that was sited on the Law Project No. 89417-6) will be suspended until 1 November 2012. On the same day Yelena Mizulina, a Duma deputy and the head of the subcommittee which sponsored the law, said that the blackout is an attempt to blackmail the Duma and was sponsored by the "pedophile lobby".

Since 2012, Russian foreign agent law resulted in reduced funding available for the Russian Wikipedia and its volunteers, who no longer can receive financial aid from abroad, including their share of funds raised through global Wikipedia fundraisers.

On 5 April 2013, it was confirmed by a spokesperson for the Federal Service for Supervision of Communications, Information Technology and Mass Media that Wikipedia had been blacklisted over the article "Курение каннабиса" ("Cannabis smoking") on Russian Wikipedia. On 31 March 2013, The New York Times reported that Russia was 'Selectively Blocking [the] Internet', though Wikipedia itself was not blocked at that time.

Articles on Russian Wikipedia, and also on other Wikipedia versions, concerning the shoot down of flight MH17 and the 2014 Russo-Ukrainian war in the Donbas region have been targeted by Internet propaganda outlets associated with the Putin-led Russian government. Some of the edits were spotted by a Twitter bot which monitors Wikipedia edits made from Russian government IP addresses.

The entire Russian Wikipedia was blocked in the Russian Federation for a few hours in August 2015 due to the contents of the article on charas.

In November 2019, Russian president Vladimir Putin called for a government-run alternative to Wikipedia. The Guardian reported state funds had already been allocated according to official documents published the previous September. The new electronic alternative was intended to be based on the Great Russian Encyclopedia. According to the London Times, the proposal had been abandoned by mid-May 2020, however, according to Great Russian Encyclopedia employee Yekaterina Chukovskaya, only the working group was disbanded and work on the project as a whole will continue.

In December 2023, the Russian Wikimedia chapter voted unanimously to dissolve itself after its director had been warned by authorities that he would be designated a "foreign agent". He also stated that he was forced to resign from the university where he worked.

==== 2022 fork ====
In June 2022, Runiversalis, a pro-government partial fork of the Russian Wikipedia, was launched. The site launched with only 9000 articles, a tiny subset of the 1.85 million articles on the Russian Wikipedia, with many articles being taken unmodified from the Russian Wikipedia.

==== Censorship and disinformation during the Russo-Ukrainian War ====
In February and March 2022, in the first week following the Russian invasion of Ukraine and breakout of the Russo-Ukrainian War, Russian Wikipedia editors warned their readers and fellow editors of several, reiterated attempts by the Putin-led Russian government of political censorship, Internet propaganda, disinformation attacks, and disruptive editing towards an article listing of Russian military casualties as well as Ukrainian civilians and children due to the ongoing war. The Wikipedia was generally considered under threat in Russia.

On 1 March 2022, Roskomnadzor, the Russian agency for monitoring and censoring mass media, wrote to the Wikimedia Foundation requesting for removal of the article "Вторжение России на Украину (с 2022)" ("2022 Russian invasion of Ukraine"). Russian courts have since levied multiple fines of 2 million rubles against the Wikimedia Foundation for refusing to delete alleged misinformation and articles about the war, such as on the Russian occupation of Zaporizhzhia Oblast.

On 11 March 2022, Belarusian political police GUBOPiK arrested and detained Mark Bernstein from Minsk, an editor of the Russian Wikipedia, who was contributing to the Wikipedia article about the Russian invasion of Ukraine. GUBOPiK accused him of the "spread of anti-Russian materials" and of violating Russian "fake news" laws.

Calls to block access to Wikipedia have been made by various Russian political actors since the beginning of the invasion. In particular, Valery Fadeyev and Igor Ashmanov, members of the Presidential Council for Civil Society and Human Rights, called on 4 April 2023 to block access because of "systemic bias".

==== 2023 fork ====
On 24 May 2023, Russian Wikipedia administrator, director, and accountant of Wikimedia RU Vladimir Medeiko, announced the opening of the fork of the Russian Wikipedia — "Рувики" ("Ruviki"), he had secretly created and aimed at promoting pro-government Russian propaganda. On the same day, by unanimous vote of the general meeting of Wikimedia RU, he was stripped of all his posts and expelled from the organization. Longtime Russian Wikipedia administrator Stanislav Kozlovsky, known as an active fighter against state censorship of the Internet and pressure on Wikipedia, was elected as the new director of Wikimedia RU. Also on the same day, Medeiko was permanently blocked from the Russian Wikipedia. In June 2023, the Wikimedia Foundation Inc. permanently banned Medeiko from all wiki projects.

==== 2024 state pressure on Wikimedia RU and its members ====
On February 2, 2024, the Russian Ministry of Justice recognized the oldest active administrator of the Russian Wikipedia (since 2004), the founder and director of "Wikimedia RU" Stanislav Kozlovsky as a "foreign agent" for publicly criticizing state censorship on the Internet, government attacks on Wikipedia, and the creation of quasi-state propaganda clones in the media Wikipedia. As a result, Kozlovsky lost his job at Moscow State University, where he taught as an associate professor for over 20 years. He was banned from teaching and educational activities, deprived of the right to earn a living (all income goes into a "special account" from which he can only pay fines), and stripped of numerous other civil rights. Currently, he cannot even edit Wikipedia, as he is required to label all articles as a "foreign agent", which is against the project's rules. Kozlovsky could face criminal prosecution for any potential violation of his numerous duties as a "foreign agent".

On March 18, 2024, the Russian Ministry of Justice added Wikimedia RU to the Register of Foreign Agents. The organization, which had supported Wikipedia in Russia for 17 years, was no longer allowed to operate and disbanded itself on February 26, 2025.

== Impact of policies on content ==
In 2021, historian Maksym Potapenko and Doctor of Political Science Mateusz Kamionka conducted a study on editing the texts of articles about Crimea since its annexation by Russia. The researchers noted the difference in terminology between the Wikipedia articles in Russian, where in 2021 the military operation of the Russian Federation in Crimea in early 2014 was called "the annexation of Crimea to Russia", and in Ukrainian, where the events were described as "annexation". In articles on the history of Crimea in Ukrainian, it is described as an ethno-historical region of Europe, Russian-language articles describe it as the imperial and Soviet heritage of Russia.

According to the researchers, this is due to the difference in the political media narrative of both countries, as the Wikipedia editions preferred sources in their own language, as well as the difference in Ukrainian and Russian historiography, which has been growing since 2014. The researchers note that the content of the articles in the Ukrainian and Russian versions is significantly influenced by the current political situation and the Russian invasion of Ukraine. "The use of history as a means to substantiate and legitimize territorial claims" is increasing, and the use of history as a tool in Wikipedia undermines the principle of neutrality, one of Wikipedia's basic principles. As researchers noted in 2021. After 2014, articles on the history of Crimea in Ukrainian Wikipedia became more independent and original in terms of sources, while articles in Russian, due to a greater number of views, had a greater impact on the audience.
