= Stanislav Kozlovsky =

Russian scientist-psychologist (born 1976)

- Станислав Козловский
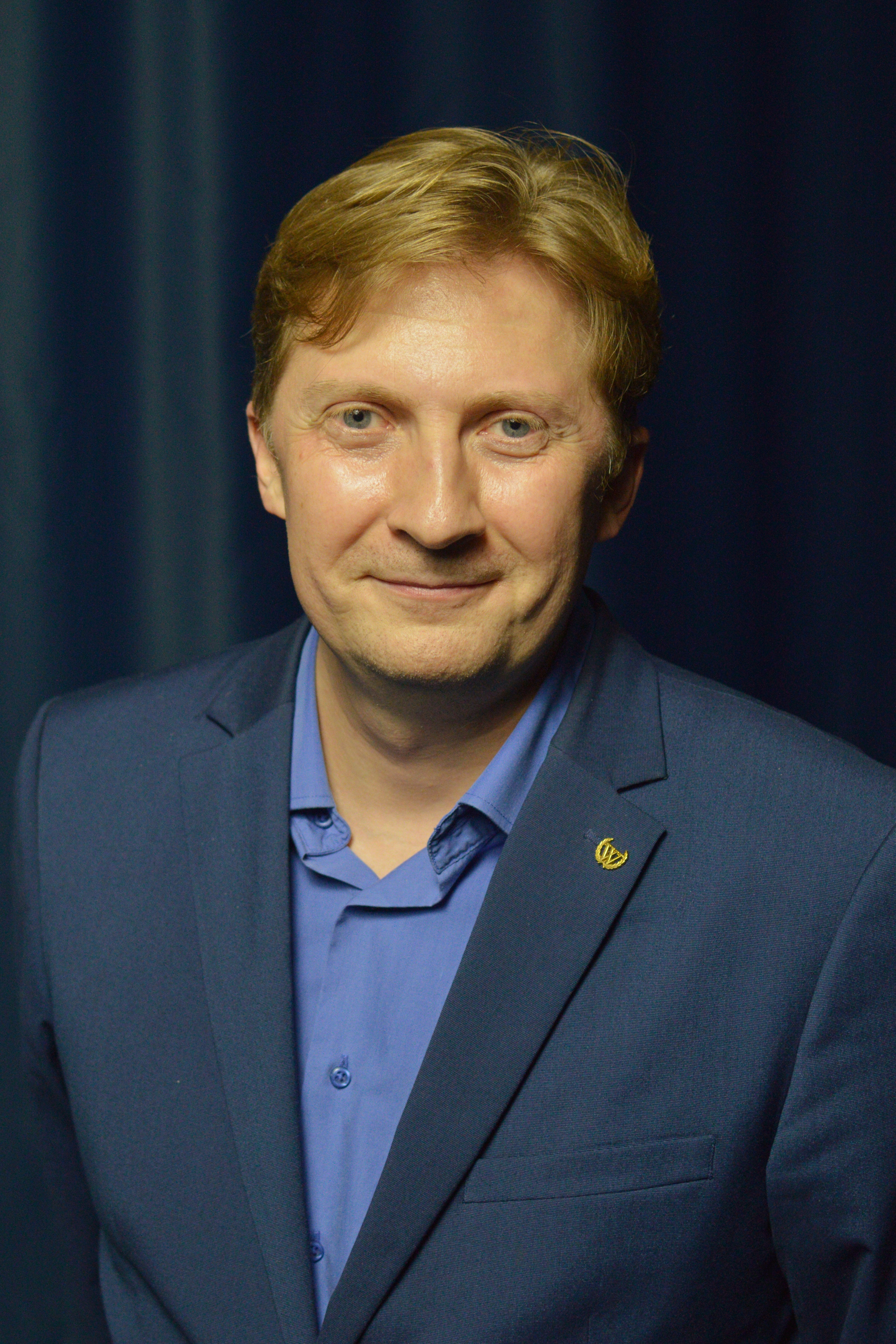
- Kozlovsky in 2021
- Born: 8 December 1976 (age 49); Moscow, Russian SFSR, Soviet Union
- Other name: Stas
- Citizenship: Soviet Union (1976–1991); Russia (since 1991)
- Occupations: Scientist; Wikipedia editor

Stanislav Alexandrovich Kozlovsky (Russian: Станислав Александрович Козловский, born 8 December 1976) is a Russian scientist-psychologist, specialist in the field of cognitive neuroscience of memory and perception. Candidate of Psychological Sciences, Associate Professor.

In addition to teaching and scientific activities, he is actively involved in promoting the Runet. He is an active participant in Russian Wikipedia and a former director of Wikimedia RU.

== Biography ==
Stanislav Kozlovsky was born on 8 December 1976, in Moscow.

In 1995 Stanislav Kozlovsky started to study in the Moscow State University, from which he graduated in 2000 with honors. In the same time he began to engage in teaching and scientific activities. Since 2014 he was working as an associate professor of the Department of Psychophysiology.

In 2003, he graduated from the graduate school of M.V. Lomonosov Moscow State University in the Department of Psychophysiology. A year later, under the scientific supervision of Professor E. N. Sokolov, defended his dissertation for the academic degree of Candidate of Psychological Sciences on the topic "Psychophysiological mechanisms storing visual images in working memory".

From 2005 to 2008, he was a researcher at the Laboratory of Psychophysiology of Creativity at the Institute of Psychology of the Russian Academy of Sciences.

From 2009 to 2013, he was Head of the Department of "Methods of Neurocognitive Research" at the Institute of Cognitive Research of the Russian Scientific Center "Kurchatov Institute". After the Institute of Cognitive Research, along with other structural divisions, joined the Kurchatov Complex of NBICS Technologies in 2010–2011, he held the position of deputy head of the laboratory of neurobiological influences, and in 2011-2012 he was a senior researcher at the laboratory of biocontrol.

In the year of 2002 he completed an internship at the University of Helsinki, in 2007 at the University of Padua, the Università Cattolica del Sacro Cuore, and in 2010 at the TU Dresden.

He is a full member of a number of scientific organizations such as the I. P. Pavlov Physiological Society of the Russian Academy of Sciences (since 2007), the Organization of Human Brain Mapping (OHBM, since 2006), the Association of Computing Technology, the International Organization of Psychophysiology at the United Nations (Eng. International Organization of Psychophysiology), the International Neuropsychological Society (English: International Neuropsychological Society, INS; since 2015).

In 2023, he was forced to resign "of his own free will" from the Faculty of Psychology of Moscow State University due to the threat of recognition as a foreign agent, after which the general meeting of Wikimedia RU decided to terminate the project for the safety of all its participants. Despite that on 2 February 2024, he was still labeled as a foreign agent.

== Teaching ==
At the Faculty of Psychology of Moscow State University he gives lecture courses on "Physiology of sensory systems", "Physiology of higher nervous activity", "Psychophysiology" for 2-3 year students, as well as special courses "Memory Mechanisms" and "Tomographic Methods in Psychophysiology" for students and undergraduates specialty "psychophysiologists". At the Faculty of Physics he teaches the section "Cognitive Neuroscience" of the special course "Fundamentals of Cognitive Sciences" for 5th year students of a specialty related to nanotechnology.

Since 2012, together with A. A. Kiselnikov at the Faculty of Psychology of Moscow State University named after M. V. Lomonosov, he has been the scientific director of the Interdisciplinary Scientific Seminar "Fundamental Cognitive Neuroscience", and since 2015 the scientific director of the School of Psychophysiology for junior students.

== Awards ==
- 2006 — Laureate of the program "Best Candidates and Doctors of Science of the Russian Academy of Sciences", conducted by the Russian Academy of Sciences and the Foundation for the Promotion of Russian Science (in the nomination "Best Candidates of Science of the Russian Academy of Sciences").
- 2008 — I.V. Kurchatov Prize in the direction of "research and development in the field of information science, computer technology and management" for the creation (together with A.V. Vartanov) of a new method for processing tomographic images, which allows to significantly reduce the dynamic range of represented intensity values MRI signal with the collection of important image details, leaving them contrasted equally in the high and low brightness ranges.
- 2009 — First place in the All-Russian competition of popular science articles and documentaries "Science to Society", held by the Ministry of Education and Science of Russia and M.V. Lomonosov Moscow State University (in the category "Best popular science article").
- 2016 — First prize in the competition of works that contribute to solving the problems of the Development Program of Moscow University (in the category "Achievements in Research Activities").

== Scientific works ==
=== In Russian ===
- Козловский С. А., Вартанов А. В. Оперативная память и зрительный вызванный потенциал // Журнал высшей нервной деятельности имени И. П. Павлова. 2000. Т. 50. No. 4. С. 638.
- Козловский С. А. Мозговые механизмы удержания зрительного образа в рабочей памяти Archived 20 December 2016 at the Wayback Machine // Психология. Журнал Высшей школы экономики. 2005. Т. 2. No. 3. С. 142–147.
- Вартанов А. В., Козловский С. А. Методы избирательной компрессии динамического диапазона томографических данных // Медицинская физика. 2008. No. 1. С. 29–35.
- Вартанов А. В., Козловский С. А., Скворцова В. Б., Созинова Е. В., Пирогов Ю. А., Анисимов Н. В., Куприянов Д. А. Память человека и анатомические особенности гиппокампа Archived 20 December 2016 at the Wayback Machine // Вестник Московского университета. Серия 14: Психология. 2009. No. 4. С. 3–16.
- Величковский Б. Б., Козловский С. А., Вартанов А. В. Тренировка когнитивных функций: перспективные исследования в России Archived 20 December 2016 at the Wayback Machine // Национальный психологический журнал. 2010. No. 1. С. 122–127.
- Величковский Б. Б., Козловский С. А. Рабочая память человека: фундаментальные исследования и практические приложения // Интеграл. 2012. No. 6. С. 14–17.
- Козловский С. А., Величковский Б. Б., Вартанов А. В., Никонова Е. Ю., Величковский Б. М. Роль областей цингулярной коры в функционировании памяти человека // Экспериментальная психология. 2012. Т. 5. No. 1. С. 12–22.
- Меньшикова Г. Я., Козловский С. А., Полякова Н. В. Исследование целостности системы «глаз-голова-тело» при помощи технологии виртуальной реальности // Экспериментальная психология. 2012. Т. 5. No. 3. С. 115–121.
- Вартанов А. В., Козловский С. А., Попов В. В., Исакова Ю. А., Баев А. А., Беззубик Е. Г., Глозман Ж. М. Методика диагностики цереброваскулярной реактивности // Избранные вопросы нейрореабилитации Материалы VII международного конгресса «Нейрореабилитация — 2015». 2015. С. 58–61.

=== In other languages ===
- Sozinova E. V., Kozlovskiy S. A., Vartanov A. V., Skvortsova V. B., Pirogov Y. A., Anisimov N. V., Kupriyanov D. A. The role of hippocampus parts in verbal memory and activation processes // International Journal of Psychophysiology. 2008. Т. 69. No. 3. С. 312.
- Kozlovskiy S. A., Pyasik M. M., Vartanov A. V., Nikonova E. Yu. Verbal working memory: magnetic resonance morphometric analysis and a psychophysiological model // Psychology in Russia: State of the Art. 2013. Т. 6. No. 3. С. 19–30.
- Kozlovskiy S., Vartanov A., Pyasik M., Nikonova E., Boris V. Anatomical Characteristics of Cingulate Cortex and Neuropsychological Memory Tests Performance // Procedia — Social and Behavioral Sciences. 2013. Т. 86. С. 128.
- Kiselnikov A. A., Sergeev A. A., Dolgorukova A. P., Vartanov A. V., Glozman J. M., Kozlovskiy S. A., Pyasik M. M. Psychophysiological mechanisms of color-emotional semantic // International Journal of Psychophysiology. 2014. Т. 94. No. 2. С. 241.
