= LGBTQ rights in Belarus =

- Location of Belarus (green) in Europe (dark grey) – [Legend]
- Legal status: Legal since 1994; age of consent is equalized
- Gender identity: Yes
- Military: No (LGBTQ persons barred from the Belarusian military on the grounds that homosexuality is a psychiatric disorder)
- Discrimination protections: No

Family rights
- Recognition of relationships: No recognition of same-sex relationships
- Restrictions: Same-sex marriage constitutionally banned since 1994
- Adoption: No

Lesbian, gay, bisexual, transgender, and queer (LGBTQ) people in Belarus face significant challenges not experienced by non-LGBTQ residents. Although same-sex sexual activity is legal in Belarus, gay and lesbian rights in the country are otherwise severely limited and homosexuality remains highly stigmatized in Belarusian society. Households headed by same-sex couples are not eligible for the same legal protections available to opposite-sex couples. Belarus provides no anti-discrimination protections for LGBTQ people, nor does it prohibit hate crimes based on sexual orientation and gender identity. Many Belarusian people believe that homosexuality is a psychiatric illness, and many LGBTQ persons in Belarus tend to hide their sexual orientation in public. Those who are "out" face harassment, violence and physical abuse.

In April 2026, Belarus enacted legislation prohibiting the "propaganda of homosexual relations, gender reassignment, childlessness, and pedophilia". Many critics have commented on its similarity to the 2013 Russian anti-LGBTQ law. As reported by CBS News and Reuters, in recent years, several countries including Georgia, Kazakhstan and the EU members Bulgaria and Hungary have also passed anti-LGBTQ "propaganda" laws that observers say are inspired by Russia's. Prior to the 2026 legislation, the Belarusian government had already moved to restrict LGBTQ expression by classifying depictions of same-sex relationships as pornography. A 2024 decree by the Ministry of Culture categorized "homosexualism" alongside pedophilia and necrophilia, enabling the criminal prosecution of LGBTQ expression under Article 343 of the Criminal Code, which carries penalties of up to four years in prison.

== LGBTQ history in Belarus ==
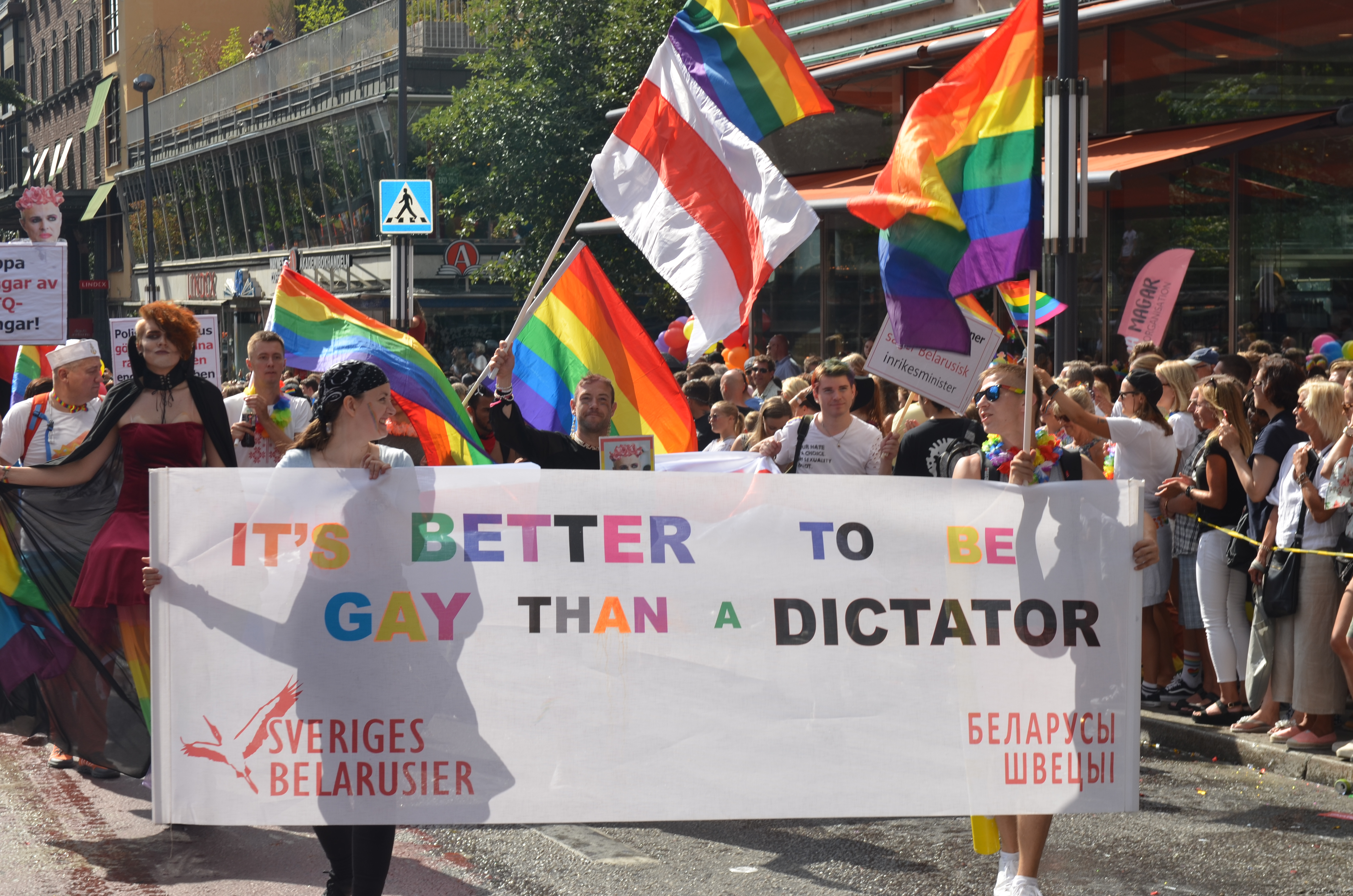
"It's better to be gay than a dictator": Belarusian delegation at EuroPride Stockholm 2018

While a part of the Soviet Union, Belarus used the laws common for all Soviet republics. As such, homosexuality was considered illegal. Sexual relationships between females have never been illegal in Belarus (though lesbians could be sent to mental institutions if discovered) while those between males were frequently prosecuted. Words such as homosexuality or gay were not present in any old Soviet code and the Soviet juridical system used the term sodomy.

Article 119-1 of the previous Criminal Code of Belarus set out that homosexual men having voluntary sexual contact were to be convicted to prison terms of up to five years. In 1989 nearly 50 Belarusian citizens were fired due to their sexual orientation. A special department was set up in the KGB to combat homosexuality. The secret services used blackmail to recruit agents from the gay community. This prevented the possibility of the emergence of any gay organization, or print media designed specifically for sexual minorities. Nonetheless, gay people met in the streets, toilets, railway stations, or gathered in private flats or houses.

In 1992 a newspaper named Sex-AntiAIDS-Plus was founded through help provided by a non-governmental organization called Stop-AIDS-Belarus (SAB). The second issue of the newspaper was intercepted by a procurator's office, and a criminal case was initiated against the newspaper. The newspaper contained personal ads for gays and lesbians. The prosecution regarded these announcements as pandering.

In 1994, the criminal case against the newspaper was dropped. However, its founder and chief editor, Ruslan Geniush, fearing persecution, stopped his publishing endeavour. In 1992 a magazine named Randez-vous was registered, and began publishing. The magazine focused primarily on personal ads and contained articles written by psychologists, sexologists and letters and announcements from LGBTQ readers in a special column called "Blue Salon". In 1994 the magazine ceased to exist.

On 1 March 1994, the Supreme Council of Belarus changed Article 119-1 of the Criminal Code of Belarus, and homosexuality became legal.

== Legality of same-sex sexual activity ==
Homosexuality was decriminalized in 1994. The age of consent for sex acts is equal and set at 16 years for homosexuals and heterosexuals.

== Recognition of same-sex unions ==
Laws regarding same-sex partnerships in Europe¹ Marriage Civil union Limited domestic recognition (cohabitation) Unrecognized Constitution limits marriage to opposite-sex couples ¹ May include recent laws or court decisions that have not yet entered into effect.

Belarus does not recognise same-sex marriage, nor any form of same-sex partnership.

Article 32 of the Constitution and the Marriage and Family Code (Articles 1 and 12) specifically define marriage as a union between a woman and a man.

== Discrimination protections ==
The Labour Code (Article 14) prohibits discrimination in the sphere of labour relations. However, sexual orientation is left out of the list of social characteristics on whose basis discrimination is legally prohibited.

Persecution on the basis of sexual orientation is not explicitly recognized in law as a ground for granting refugee status. Same sex partners are not recognized for the purposes of immigration law. After the fall of the communist regime many Belarusians requested and were granted political asylum abroad, based on fear of persecution because of their sexual orientation. The most frequent reason cited was formal or informal harassment by the police. Amnesty International and Lesbian, Gay, Bisexual and Transgender Network – Belarus (AILGBT-Belarus) has information on individuals who were granted asylum in the Czech Republic, France, Netherlands, and Sweden.

== 2026 anti-LGBT legislation ==
In February 2024, the Belarusian Parliament drafted a bill to prohibit the "propaganda of homosexual relations, gender reassignment, childlessness, and pedophilia." The House of Representatives approved the bill in October 2025, and the Council of the Republic granted final parliamentary approval on 2 April 2026. President Alexander Lukashenko signed the bill into law on 15 April 2026.

In April 2024, the Ministry of Culture of Belarus expanded the definition of pornography to include "homosexualism, lesbian love and the desire to live and be seen by others as a person of an opposite sex". Public displays of pornography are punishable in Belarus with up to four years in prison.

== LGBTQ rights movement in Belarus ==
=== LGBTQ organizations ===
There is no official organization in Belarus that represents the interests of gays and lesbians in Belarus. The Women's Organization (Jyana), which was officially registered is working on "gender questions." Jyana, which protected young women in the country, recently announced that it soon will close. The men's organization, Republican Youth (Vstrecha) is not an LGBT-organization, but conducts a great deal of work aimed at preventing HIV infection and AIDS among men who have sex with men. Any other organization or initiative is working outside the legal framework.

- Belarus Lambda League
- Belarusian initiative by sexual and gender equality
- GayBelarus - LGBT Human Rights Project, the organizer of the Slavic Pride in May 2010 in Minsk
- Vstrecha ["Meeting"], located in Minsk, Главная - РМОО ВСТРЕЧА - САЙТ МУЖСКОГО ЗДОРОВЬЯ. The oldest gay group in Belarus, founded in the early 1990s. Activities include HIV/AIDS prevention and support groups.
- Gay Alliance Belarus was founded in 2008 and represents the interests of the LGBTQ community. Gay Alliance organized a national competition of Mister Gay Belarus and edits a national LGBTQ web site www.gayby.net and LGBT.BY.
- LGBTQ+ House develops the Belarus LGBTQ+ Discourse Pressure Index (BLDPI), a research tool that monitors public Telegram messages from sources with editorial operations inside Belarus and publishes monthly metrics of discursive pressure and positive deviations concerning LGBTQ+ people.

=== Gay pride controversies ===
Violations of the rights to freedom of expression and freedom of assembly in Belarus were repeatedly condemned by the international community.

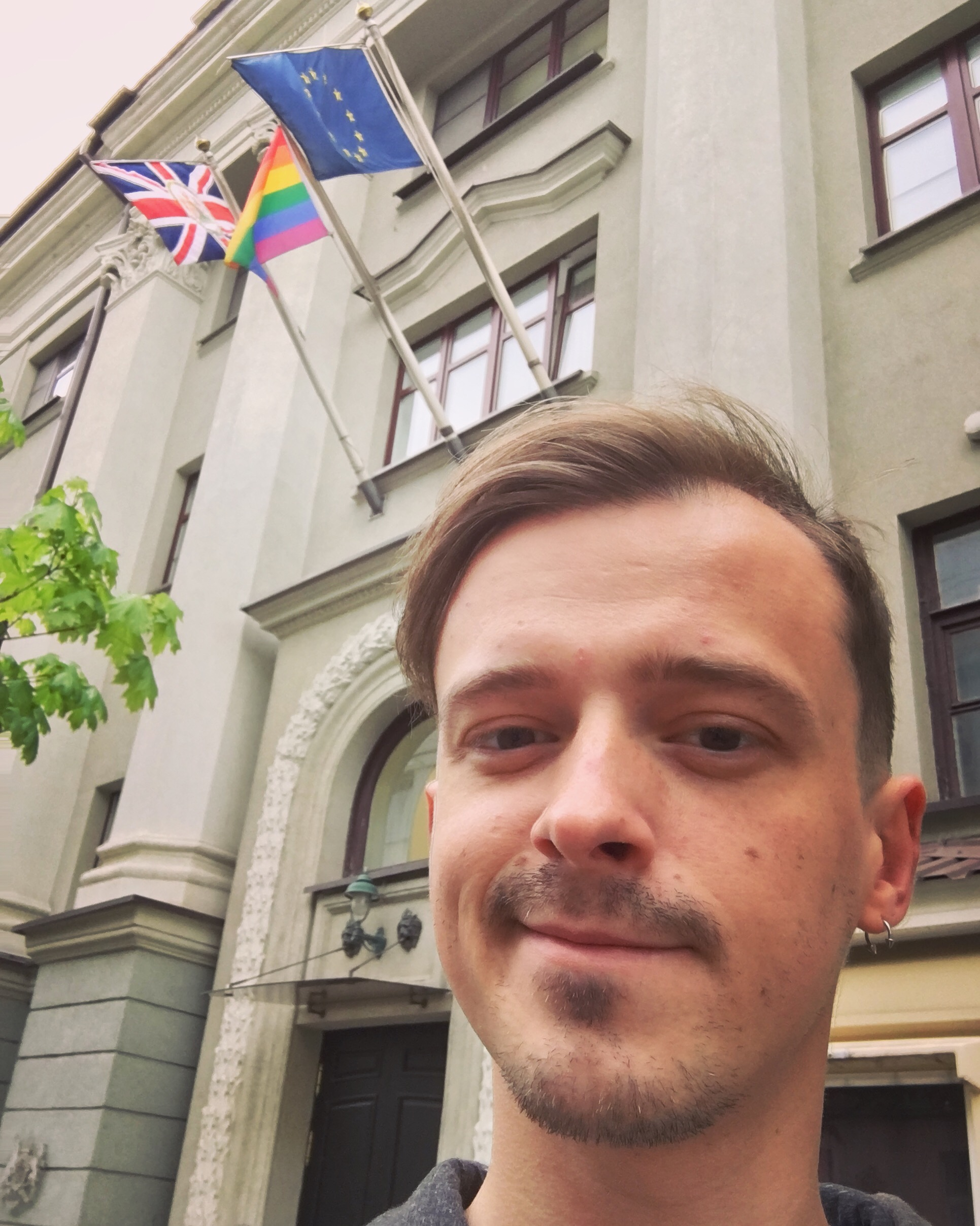
Rainbow flag flying from the British Embassy, Minsk, 17 May 2019

After previous failed efforts, in 1999 a gay pride festival was organised by the Belarusian League for Sexual Equality “Lambda” BLL and Forum Lambda, a magazine for Belarusian gays and lesbians. The festival program included a seminar for journalists on "lesbians and gay men in the media", conference on the rights of gays and lesbians in Belarus and in the world, the exhibition of photographs and films taken homosexuals, and the competitions “Mr. Gay Belarus” and “Transmission”. The festival was supported by the UN Development Programme, studio Tatyana, United Way Belarus, IREX, the Titanic Club, and guests from Ukraine. During one of the parties, the club was raided by riot police that frisked the contestants.

In 2000, the organisers of the festival encountered great difficulty in preparing for the event. According to Edward Tarletski, head of the organising committee, the radio station Radio BA which was to cover the event and grant its dancehall for evening events received an order from the presidential administration not to do so. Other radio stations reportedly refused support on the same grounds, and events at other venues also were canceled. Orthodox Church-related groups demonstrated in Minsk against the gay festival on 9 September, on the day before the festival was planned. The pride march through the city was banned by the city government 24 hours before it was due to take place, and authorities acted on the day to prevent festivities. Newspapers reported the outcome of the day.

In 2001, the Belarus government allegedly prohibited the Belarus Gay Pride Festival. On 3 August 2001, unidentified vandals broke into and vandalised the flat of Lambda Belarus leader Andrei Babkin where fliers, posters and booklets of Gay Pride 2001 had been kept.

In 2002, days before Gay Pride 2002, Lambda Belarus leader Edward Tarletski was called to the Minsk police station where he was told that if a gay pride parade took place, "the police will not take any responsibility for possible disorder."

In 2004, an international gay and lesbian festival was forced to be canceled. The organizing committee of the final (Belarusian) phase of the 4th International Moonbow Human Rights & Homo Cultural Festival and the first stage of this year's ILGCN (International Lesbian & Gay Cultural Network) World Lesbian and Gay World Conference in August 2004 were forced to cancel the event in Minsk. This came after authorities frightened a club owner into withdrawing his promise to host the event. In addition, threatening phone calls from authorities said foreigners trying to attend the event for workshops and discussions "would be immediately expelled from the country in keeping with the article of intervention in domestic affairs of the Republic of Belarus."

On 27 October 2008, the same group asked permission to hold a protest in support of gay rights near the Russian Embassy in Minsk. Both events were not authorised. Because the country is currently not a member of the Council of Europe, Belarusian activists cannot appeal to the European Court of Human Rights. It is the same group which decided to organise with Russian LGBTQ activists at Slavic Pride which is planned to alternate between Moscow and Minsk every year.

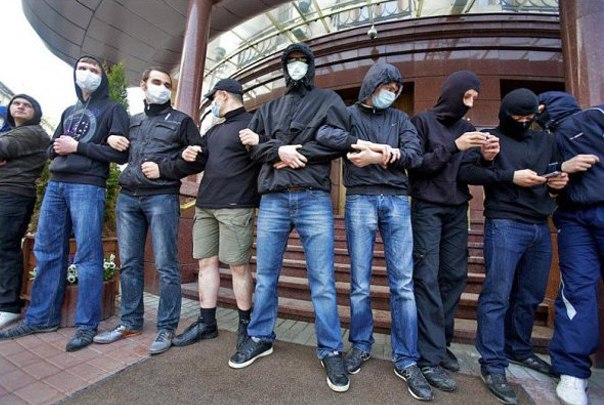
Slavic Gay Pride 2010 was contested by violent protestors

In January 2009, an event titled "The Right to Love" was planned and designed to raise public awareness about homophobia and discrimination against LGBTQ people in Belarus. Authorization was denied. LGBTQ activist Roman Mandryk filed a complaint in the Court of the Central Borough of Gomel in response to this decision of the Gomel City Administration. In the text of the complaint, Mr. Mandryk claims that the decision of the Gomel City Administration violated his right to freedom of Assembly as guaranteed by Article 35 of the Constitution of Belarus. He adds that Regulation 299 itself is unconstitutional in that it imposes unreasonable burdens on those seeking to organize public gatherings.

The 2010 Minsk Pride was also banned by the government, resulting in police beatings and arrests, including of activist Sergey Androsenko, who subsequently filed a lawsuit against the government at a Minsk court and later before the UN Human Rights Committee, which issued a statement in favor of Androsenko's claim in 2016. He also accused President Lukashenko of "state-sponsored homophobia."

=== Month against Homophobia ===
The "Month against Homophobia" was a campaign by Belarusian LGBTQ activists from 17 April to 17 May 2009 in Minsk, Grodno and Luninets. It consisted of informational campaigns and events. The month was organized by Gayby.org, Gay.by, members of the League of Sexual Equality "Lambda", and Amnesty International (Belarus). More than 50 media outlets reported about the month's events. Belarusian media began to talk about gay and lesbian people.

The main aim of the Month against Homophobia was to resist any kind of physical, moral and symbolic violence to people with a different sexual orientation and gender identity, to show solidarity to LGBTQ people in the world who are unable to fight for their rights, and to carry a wider campaign for human rights.

== Social conditions ==
=== Anti-LGBTQ violence ===
There is no Belarusian law that refers specifically to perpetrators of crimes motivated by homophobia. In the Criminal Code, homosexuals are only singled out when they are the offender, not the victim, of a crime. Judicial and police organs do not express any eagerness to collect evidence about the homophobic motives of those who perpetrate crimes. Judges are not obliged to consider such motives as aggravating the circumstances of guilt, or to impose more severe punishments when homophobic motives are present. LGBTQ people are in danger to face discrimination and violence.

On 18 April 2001, a dead body of the pensioner Alexander Stephanovich, known in Minsk as a homosexual, was found in the yard of the apartment block where he lived. His body was stabbed all over with knives. On 16 May of the same year, Andrei Babkin, an activist with Lambda Belarus, was badly beaten and raped at the entrance to his flat. He was taken to the hospital with severe injuries.

On 2 July, the police in Minsk detained and badly beat Andrei Scherbakov, one of the founders of Lambda Belarus. The next day, Ivan Suchinski, the owner of the gay club Oskar was killed. The club had been closed by the authorities in February 2000, and Ivan brought civil claims because of the unfair actions of the police. On 13 November 2001 in Molodechno, Lambda Belarus leader Edward Tarletski was assaulted which resulted in a concussion and required seven days' hospitalization.

On 15 February 2002 in Zhlobin (Gomel Region), 34-year-old accountant Victor Kovyl was found dead in his parents’ flat. He was an openly gay man both at work and in public. The police refused to give the details of the murder to Kovyl's partner Alexander and one of the members of the police said to him: “It serves you right, sodomites (faggots)!”.

On 12 April 2002, an assault and beating of gay men took place outside the gay club “Babylon”. According to witnesses a group of skin heads (10 to 12 men) attacked three patrons before the police arrived. Among the victims was Edward Tarletski, editor-in-chief of gay magazine Forum Lambda and leader of Lambda Belarus. On 10 June in Kommunar, Buda-Kashalyova District, Gomel region, three unidentified men beat and raped local resident Dmitrii L., 18. The victim was taken to the hospital where he spent two weeks.

On the evening of 2 October 2002, Edward Tarletski was assaulted outside his flat entrance on his way home. Four unidentified men asked him if his name was Tarletski and started beating him. That night he was taken to the hospital. He had a broken shoulder and three smashed teeth.

In 2002, the Minsk police started a criminal case in connection with the murder of Mikhail M., 50, whose mutilated body was found in his flat on 17 November. According to the police this was the fifth murder of this kind committed in the capital of Belarus. However, the detectives fully denied the possibility of a serial killer.

On 18 February 2003 Tarletski was beaten again by unidentified persons near his house. Edward was taken to the hospital with a head injury and plenty of bruises on his body. On 29 March of the same year, a bouncer at the night club Budda-Bar in Minsk beat Yuliya Yukhnovetz, a volunteer for Minsk Pride, because she kissed a girl in the club hallway. She was taken to the hospital where she was diagnosed with an injured cranium.

On 28 May 2008, Edward Tarletski was attacked again by three youths in Minsk. Tarletski stated that he did not intend to report the attack to police because they would not do anything about the incident. He also said this attack was the third against him in five years.

At the mid of September 2008, two transgender men had been raped in Minsk. Victims did not report to the police; they were not sure that they would help them.

In prisons and correctional facilities, homosexuality is subject to speculation, blackmail and extortion. While in prison, gays and lesbians are largely unprotected. Reportedly, executing bodies often make use of prisoners’ sexual inclinations to receive needed data, and turnkeys often encourage prisoners to abuse homosexuals.

Police officers seek information of a personal nature about homosexual persons who are victims of violence. This information is of no relevance to the prosecution the perpetrators of the crimes against those victims. Police officers collect information of a personal nature as well as passport data and mugshots of homosexual persons who visit known gay cruising areas. The national NGO “Vstrecha” [“Meeting”] (HIV-prevention group for gay men) reported about those practices in Brest and Gomel. Police officers refuse to register cases of brutality committed against sexual minorities and do not conduct investigations that would seek criminal responsibility from the perpetrators of crimes motivated by homophobic prejudice. Lambda Belarus reported many cases of brutality against lesbians and gays and passive behaviour of police in all regions of the country. Police have conducted unprovoked actions in bars frequented by homosexuals. AILGBT-Belarus, “Vstrecha”, Lambda Belarus and lesbian group “YANA” reported about those practices in Gomel and Minsk.

=== Mental health ===
A high percentage of suicide is observed amongst gays, lesbians, bisexuals and transgender people. Qualified psychological help generally is not available. In Minsk, the capital of Belarus, three universities – Belarus State University, Belarus Pedagogical University and European Humanities University – have full psychology courses in their curriculum but do not address the problems of sexual minorities.

=== Discrimination ===
==== In education ====
In May 2003, the administration of the European Humanities University in Minsk banned a showing of the documentary Outlawed about discrimination of gays and lesbians all around the world. According to the university staff, the ban was made under pressure of the Russian Orthodox Church.

==== In the military ====
According to the Belarusian Ministry of Defense and the Center for the Study of Sexual Minorities in the Military of the University of California, Santa Barbara, Belarus bans gays from serving in the military. AILGBT-Belarus has documented at least five cases of gay men from Gomel who did not serve in the army because of their sexual orientations. No cases of harassment of gays in the army are reported, but this may be the result of gay individuals hiding their sexuality.

=== Political figures' stances on LGBTQ rights ===
The open support of lesbians and gays is not a popular position for a political movement in Belarus. In July 2001, the Organising Committee of the 1st Belarusian Youth Congress, voted against allowing delegates of Lambda Belarus to participate. In March 2002, a number of Belarusian media published the statements of Young Front (the youth organisation of Belarusian Popular Front), which contained homophobic statements. Specifically, Young Front leader Paval Sieviaryniec published a letter where he called homosexuality “a death-worthy sin and perversion”. According to Sieviaryniec, the fact of the existence of homosexuals is “the result of spoiling and sinfulness in the world”.

In another incident, Belarusian sexual minorities attempted to make a formal statement of solidarity with victims of the Chernobyl disaster. This attempt created a backlash, which led to an opposition youth leader, Zmitser Dashkevich, stating on the radio program "Freedom Night" that Belarus is no place for gays, and that homosexuals are sick people and that the opposition would not enter into a dialogue with them.

In September 2004, President Lukashenko, in a speech before the Belarusian Security Council, said, "we have to show our society in the near future, what ‘they’ [the European Union and the United States] are doing here, how they are trying to turn our girls into prostitutes, how they are feeding our citizens with illicit drugs, how they are spreading sexual perversion here, which methods they are employing".

In 2018, minister of interior Igor Shunevich used abusive language on national television describing homosexuals. Human rights defenders called to open a criminal case for discriminatory statements, but the government didn't find any violations by Shunevich.

== Blood donation ==
There are no particular limitations for gay and bisexual men to donate blood. All the procedures and requirements are the same for all donors.

== Public opinion ==
Gay life is still largely underground, and most Belarusians consider homosexuality a disorder. Homophobic attitudes, suspicions and prejudices are still very strong. According to a survey by the Belarusian Lambda League for Sexual Equality (Lambda Belarus) in April 2002, 47% of Belarusians think that gays should be imprisoned. In 2007, Information Center TEMA and MyGomel.com organized a vote about the reaction of Gomel region youth to sexual minorities. 47.6% had negative feelings to sexual and gender minorities, 10% want to criminalize homosexual relations.

The most recent poll by Pew Research Center published in May 2017 suggests that 16% of Belarusians are in favor of same-sex marriage while 81% oppose the idea, which was significantly higher than in Ukraine (12%), Russia (5%) and Moldova (5%). Younger people are more likely than their elders to favor legal gay marriage (22% vs. 14%).

In May 2017, a survey by the Pew Research Center in Eastern European countries showed that 84% of Belarusians believed that homosexuality should not be accepted by society.

== Summary table ==
| Same-sex sexual activity legal | Yes (Since 1994) |
| Equal age of consent (16) | Yes |
| Freedom of expression | No (Since 2026) |
| Anti-discrimination laws in employment only | No |
| Anti-discrimination laws in the provision of goods and services | No |
| Anti-discrimination laws in all other areas (incl. indirect discrimination, hate speech) | No |
| Anti-discrimination laws concerning gender identity | No |
| Same-sex marriages | No (Constitutional ban since 1994) |
| Recognition of same-sex couples | No |
| Step-child adoption by same-sex couples | No |
| Joint adoption by same-sex couples | No |
| Gays and lesbians allowed to serve openly in the military | No |
| Right to change legal gender | No (Only nominal:Highly bureaucratic, lengthy two-stage process: deciding body meets only twice a year; permission for medical or surgical interventions only at the second stage. Flaw in passport conversion whereby passport number may reveal former designation of sex to agencies. Psychiatric disorder for a lifetime afterwards with torture from police everywhere) |
| Access to IVF for lesbians | No |
| Commercial surrogacy for gay male couples | No |
| MSMs allowed to donate blood | Yes |

== See also ==
- Human rights in Belarus
- LGBTQ rights in Europe
- Minsk Gay Pride

== Notes ==
1. "Worldwide Ages of Consent". Avert.org.
2. "Homosexual Rights Around The World". Gay Rights Info. Archived from the original on 16 September 2005.
3. Transgender Europe (TGEU) (30 November 2021). "Trans rights European Index 2017" (PDF). TGEU. Archived from the original (PDF) on 21 January 2022.
4. International Centre for Civil Initiatives (22 October 2019). "The monitoring of discrimination of transgender people in Belarus". Our House: Belarus. Republic of Belarus.
5. ""Gay Pride Belarus '99" held in Minsk from 9 to 12 September". International Lesbian and Gay Association. Archived from the original on 12 March 2005.
6. "Gay and Lesbian Issues in Belarus". A Belarus Miscellany. Archived from the original on 24 February 2001.
7. "Belarus Authorities Forbid Year 2000 Gay Pride Festival". GayToday. Archived from the original on 16 July 2012.
8. "Gay Belarus News & Reports 2004–05". Global Gayz.com. Archived from the original on 18 October 2005.
9. "International Briefs". Bay Windows.
10. ^{a} ^{b} "Month against homophobia in Belarus". Gay.by. Archived from the original on 11 January 2016.
