= Nikolay Alexeyev =

Russian LGBT rights activist and lawyer

- Николай Алексеев
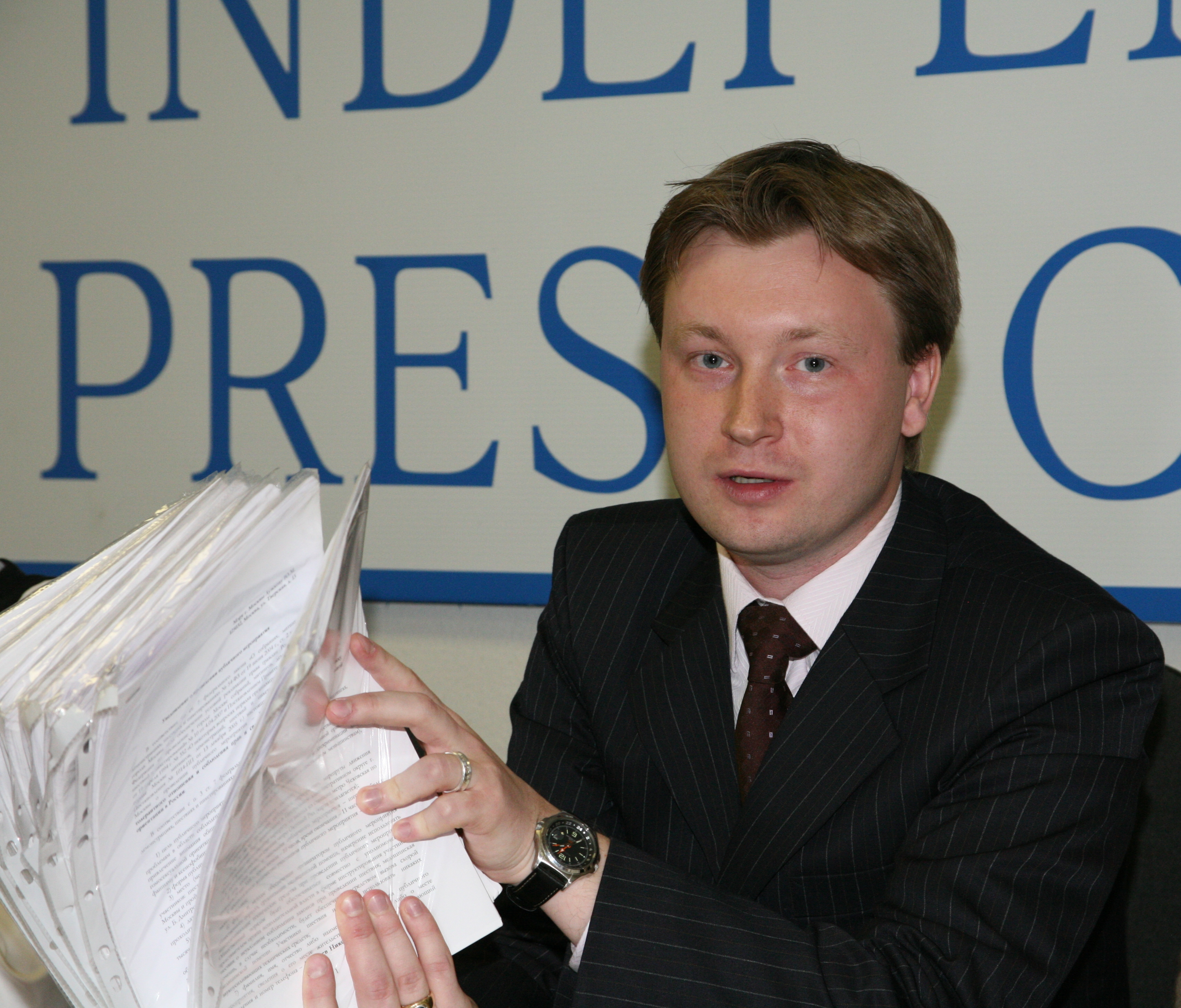
- Alexeyev at the Moscow Pride Press Conference, 16 May 2008
- Born: Nikolay Alexandrovich Alexeyev; 23 December 1977 (age 48); Moscow, Russian SFSR, Soviet Union
- Education: Moscow State University (2000)
- Occupations: LGBT rights activist, lawyer, journalist

Speech given by Nikolay Alexeyev on LGBT rights in Russia, May 25, 2009

Nikolay Alexandrovich Alexeyev (also spelled as Alekseyev, Alekseev, or Alexeev (Russian: Никола́й Алекса́ндрович Алексе́ев) born 23 December 1977) is a Russian former LGBT rights activist, lawyer and journalist.

On 21 October 2010, Alexeyev won the first ever case at the European Court of Human Rights on LGBT human rights violations in Russia. The Strasbourg-based court unanimously ruled that by banning three Moscow Prides in 2006, 2007 and 2008, Russia breached three articles of the European Convention on Human Rights. In January 2011, the Russian Government asked the Court to refer the case for re-consideration to the Grand Chamber. On 11 April 2011, five judges panel of the European Court dismissed Russia's appeal and the verdict on illegality of Moscow Pride bans came into force the same day.

From 2005, Alexeyev was known as the founder and chief organizer of Moscow Pride, which was met with extreme official hostility until its final banning in 2012. Together with the activists of his advocacy group GayRussia.Ru, Alexeyev attempted to organize a large number of public actions to defend the rights of sexual minorities in Russia. For five years, none of the LGBT public actions for which he and his fellow activists required the permission of the Russian authorities was allowed to take place. On 1 October 2010, he was for the first time ever authorized to organize a sanctioned picketing in Moscow with the aim to call for economic boycott of Swiss International Air Lines due to its role in the arrest of Alexeyev at Moscow Domodedovo airport on 15 September 2010.

Following a series of antisemitic outbursts directed at western LGBT rights figures and institutions, Alexeyev permanently ended his activism in 2013. He was granted Swiss citizenship in 2016, and lives in Geneva with his husband.

== Background ==
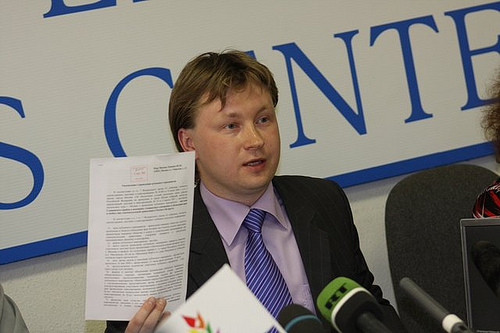
Alexeyev at the Slavic Pride Press Conference, 5 May 2009

Born and raised in Moscow, in 1995, Alexeyev graduated from high-school with the advanced study of English language. In 2000, he graduated with honors from the Lomonosov Moscow State University with a degree in Public Administration (previously known as the Institute of Public Administration and Social Studies).

During his studies, Alexeyev became interested in the Constitutional Law in Russia. In the summers of 1996, 1997, and 1998, he worked as an intern in the Secretariat of the Russian Constitutional Court in Moscow. As an assistant to the judge, he prepared case materials and confinements for the decisions of the Court.

In 1998, being a third year student of Lomonosov Moscow State University, Alexeyev released his first book Citizen's Complaints to the Constitutional Court.

Between November 2000 to February 2001, he worked as a special correspondent for the Russian daily newspaper Sevodnya. The paper which belonged to Russian oligarch Vladimir Gusinsky was closed in April 2001 after state-owned Gazprom-Media took full control over it.

After graduating from the University, Alexeyev stayed at his department to continue postgraduate studies in constitutional, municipal and administrative law. In November 2001, he was forced to leave the Postgraduate Program of the Moscow State University, Department of Public Administration (Legal Fundamentals of State Regulation Department) due to the non-acceptance of his research of the legal status of sexual minorities as his thesis. This research was published in his 2002 book "Legal Regulation of the Status of Sexual Minorities: Russia in the Light of International Organisations' Practice and Legislation of Other Countries".

In June 2002, Alexeyev published his second book "Gay Marriage: Family Status of Same-Sex Couples in International, National and Local Law" which summarized legal situation in terms of the recognition of same-sex unions around the world.

Alexeyev appealed to Court against the University claiming he was victim of sexual orientation discrimination. On 10 June 2005, Moscow's Nikulinskiy District Court dismissed his claim. The decision was confirmed on appeal by Moscow City Court in September 2005. In May 2006, Alexeyev filed his first complaint with the European Court of Human Rights in Strasbourg, France which was registered under #9689/06. As of November 2010, the case was not considered by the Court and not communicated to Russian authorities.

In October 2002, Alexeyev authored a report titled "Curbing Prostitution: Western Experience and International Law" ordered by former State Duma Deputy Alexander Barannikov. The report was supposed to help the deputy's initiative to legalize prostitution in Russia. Finally, the deputy was in minority in his party and no bill was introduced in the Parliament.

In 2003, Alexeyev authored a comprehensive research dedicated to the history and contemporary reform of the upper chamber of British Parliament "House of Lords: From the Court of King Egbert to the Revolution of Prime Minister T. Blair (825-2003)".

In February 2005, Alexeyev decided to fully dedicate himself to activism for the rights of Russian LGBT people. On 17 May 2005, on the first International Day Against Homophobia (IDAHO), he launched Russian LGBT Human Rights Project Gayrussia.ru, an organization advocating LGBT rights in Moscow. The launch of the organization was marked by a press conference which was fully ignored by the media.

In an interview with In These Times, published on 30 November 2007, Alexeyev explained that he "realized it wouldn't be possible to change things in Russia just by writing" and that "he should be involved in more activist work and try to bring changes for LGBT rights." Gay activism became his full-time occupation.

== Currently held positions ==
- Founder and Head of the Russian LGBT Human Rights Project GayRussia.Ru (since 17 May 2005)
- Founder and Chairman of Moscow Pride Organizing Committee (since foundation in July 2005)
- Vice President of the International Day Against Homophobia Committee since 2008 (previous position: Executive Secretary since creation of the organization in November 2005)
- Member of the Board and Regional Director for Eastern Europe of InterPride

== Reputation and awards ==
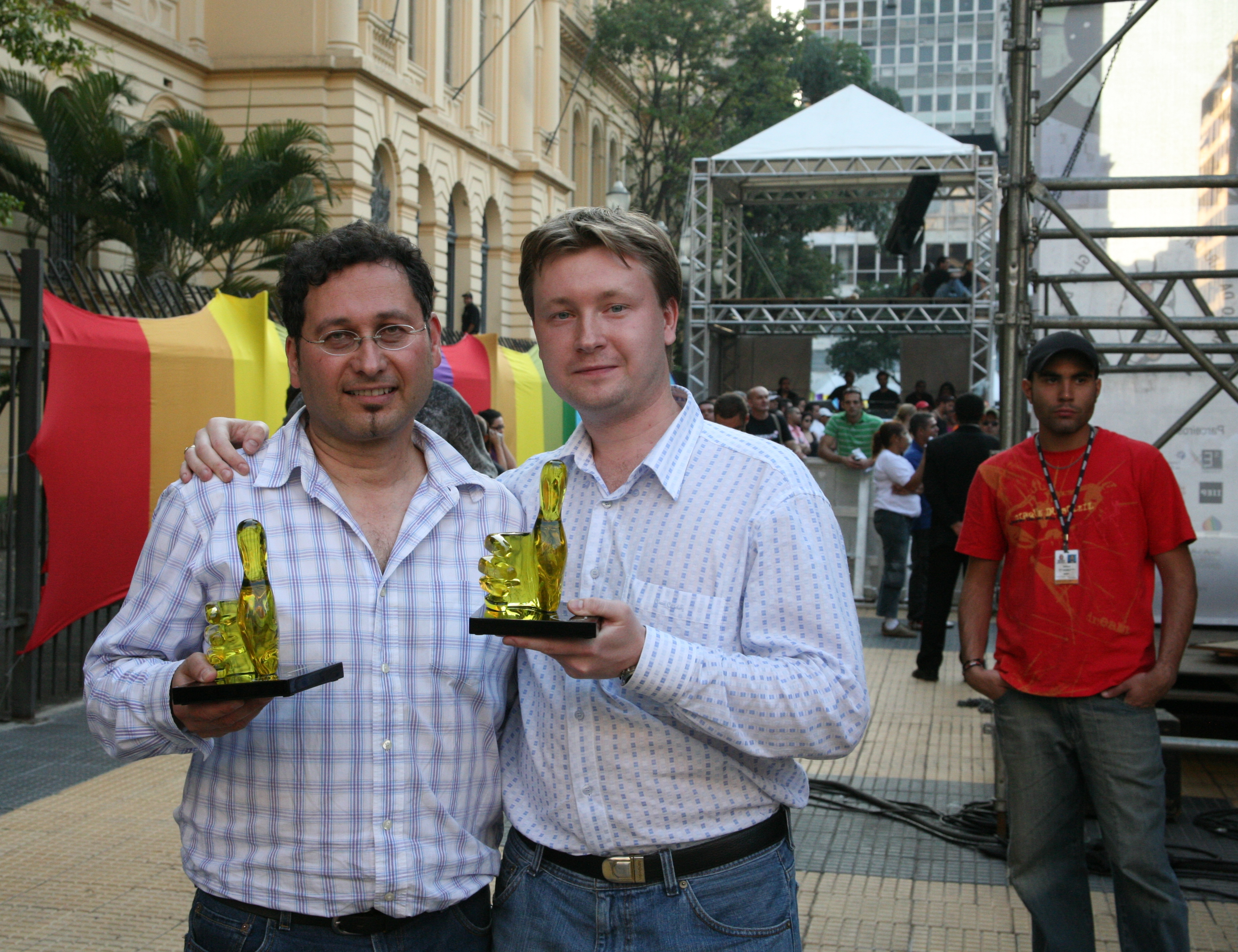
Alexeyev and Jerry Levinson from Jerusalem with the São Paulo awards, May 2008.

Since 2005, Alexeyev earned his reputation in gay activism as a person who would not compromise on his ideals and who will not give up on his fights for LGBT rights in Russia and other countries. The leading French gay and lesbian magazine Tetu called him in March 2009 "l'activiste le plus acharné du continent" which could be translated into English as "the most stubbornly persistent activist on the continent" In December 2010 leading American gay magazine "The Advocate" called Alexeyev "the most visible crusader in his country".

In 2000, Alexeyev received the "Red Diploma" (Moscow) from the Faculty of Public Administration of the Lomonosov Moscow State University for excellent achievements in studies. The Red Diploma is awarded to the graduates with the best performance.

In 2006, together with the founder of the International Day Against Homophobia Louis-Georges Tin and co-organizers of Moscow Pride Nikolay Baev and Evgenia Debryanskaya, Alexeyev received the "ILGCN Grizzly Bear" (Moscow), "honouring outstanding and courageous efforts in the face of unusually fierce homophobia".

In 2006, Alexeyev also received GALHA Award (London), in recognition of "his courage in challenging homophobia in Russia and beyond".

On 17 June 2008, The Advocate called him a Global Pride Warrior together with three other activists from Nepal, Nigeria and Chile.

Also in 2008, Alexeyev received the HERO Award (Los Angeles), "for his attempts to stage full Prides". The award was presented during the Grand Finale of the Mr Gay International Competition in Los Angeles.

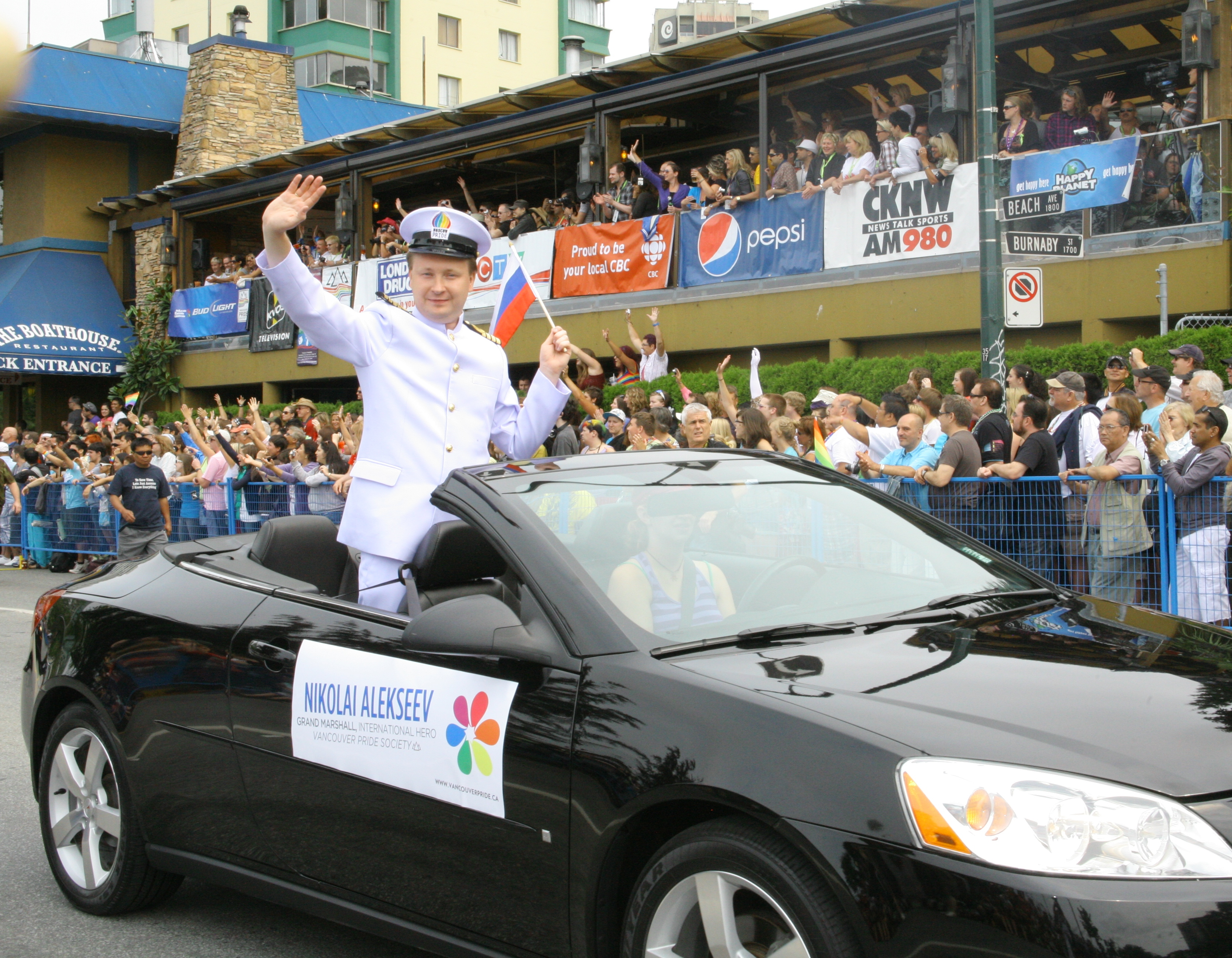
Alexeyev as Vancouver Pride grand marshal on 1 August 2010

Also in 2008, Alexeyev received São Paulo's Citizen Award for Respecting Diversity São Paulo. It was presented by the Associação da Parada do Orgulho LGBT de São Paulo (APOGLBT).

On 14 May 2009, Radio Free Europe Radio Liberty called Alexeyev "A Man of the week" after the organisation of the Slavic Pride during the "Eurovision Song Contest" final in Moscow.

In July 2010, Alexeyev received "A Hero Award" in international nomination presented by Vancouver Pride Society. On 1 August 2010, he was a grand marshal of Vancouver Gay Parade, heading the march in white navy uniform with the logo of Moscow Pride. The interview with Alexeyev was published by the leading Canadian LGBT newspaper Xtra.com. During his stay in Vancouver he also took part in two TV shows on local ShawTV explaining the situation for LGBT rights in Russia.

In December 2010, Romanian LGBT portal Angelicuss.com named Alexeyev as "A Man of the Year 2010". According to the publication, he is "one of the most respected human rights activist in the world and he is a model to us for his determination and self sacrifice. Nikolai is a symbol of dignity maintained against the waves of hatred which drown Russia".

Alexeyev is known to be a personal friend of German Bundestag member Volker Beck, British gay rights activist Peter Tatchell, President of IDAHO Committee Louis-Georges Tin, writer and Oscar Wilde's grandson Merlin Holland. He was also a friend of Jacques Teyssier.

== Media appearance ==
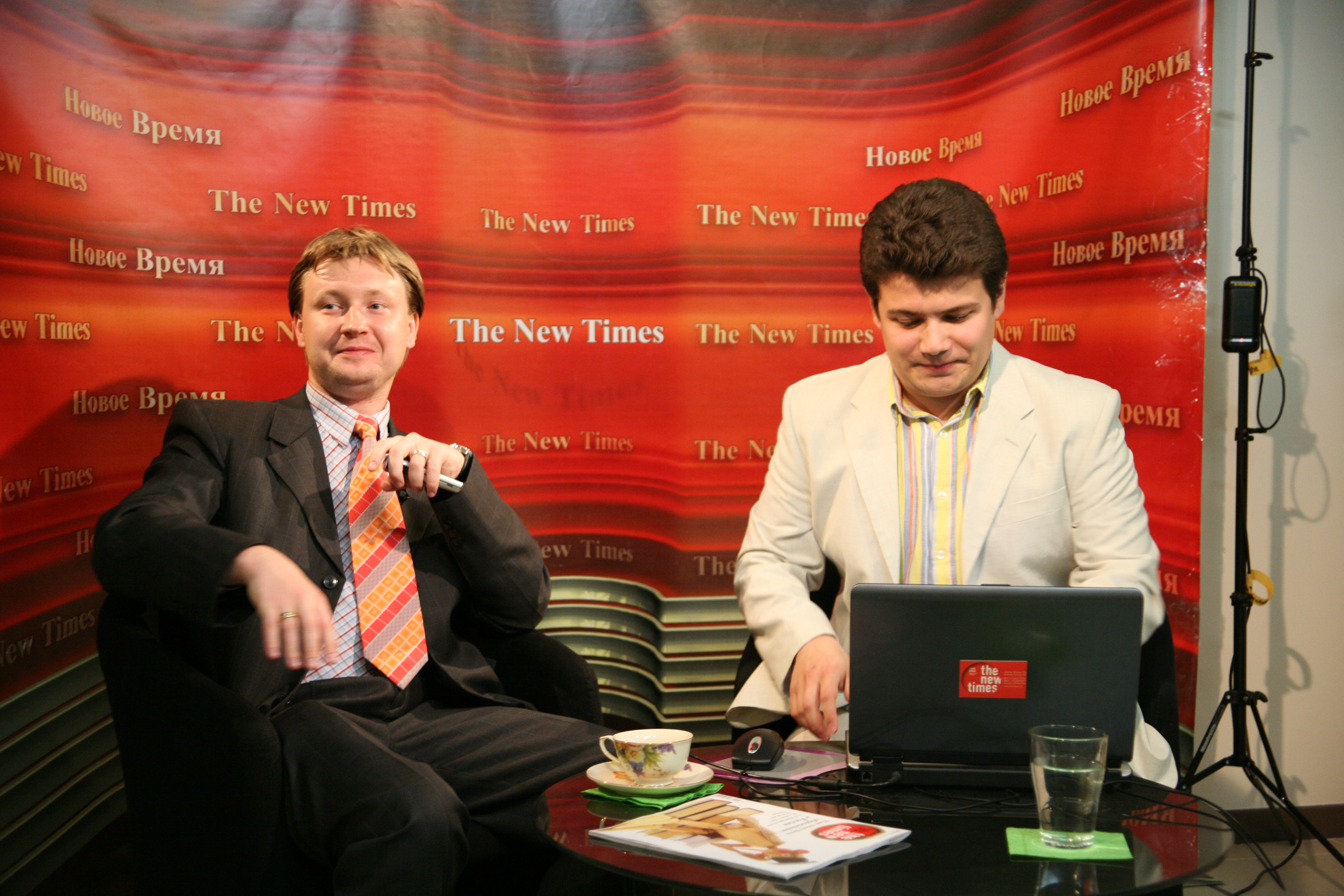
Alexeyev during the interview with The New Times after third Moscow Pride, 2 June 2008

According to the leading Russian Internet search engine Yandex.Ru, Alexeyev is the most quoted gay activist in Russian media on LGBT issues. He takes part in various TV and radio programs in Russia and abroad.

He was twice invited to take part in the most watched talk show on Russian TV K baryeru! (NTV Russia Television) hosted by Vladimir Solovyov (journalist) for six years. The show took a form of a debate between two participants with the conductor acting as a referee and asking questions. The program was widely watched in Russia because it was broadcast during prime time throughout the country. It was last aired on 23 April 2009, after which the channel's administration took a decision to close the program.

"K baryeru" - Nikolay Alexeyev v. State Duma deputy Svetlana Goryacheva, was broadcast on 18 May 2006. The debate was initiated after the organizers for the first time notified Moscow Mayor about their intention to conduct a Gay Pride in Moscow.

"K baryeru" - Nikolay Alexeyev v. State Duma deputy Alexander Chuyev was broadcast on 21 June 2007. The debate was initiated after Orthodox youth movement "Georgievtsy" organized picketings of the gay cruising area in downtown Moscow.

During the second program Alexander Chuyev linked Alexeyev to oligarch Boris Berezovsky and called him an extremist. In the final round of the show a scandal started after Alexeyev called Alexander Chuyev "gay, coward and hypocrite". A week later, at the request of the deputy, criminal investigation was started against the activist. After a private peaceful agreement between the parties Alexender Chuyev asked the judge to dismiss the charges and close the case. Alexeyev also tried to prosecute Alexander Chuyev on the basis of the very same talk show but he was denied by the prosecution department.

On 2 December 2007, Alexander Chuyev, who in 2007 initiated a bill in the State Duma to criminalize "propaganda of homosexuality", was not re-elected during the parliamentary elections. On 5 December 2007, he admitted in the interview that the reason for his defeat was his homophobia. His bill to re-criminalize homosexuality was only rejected by the State Duma on 8 May 2009, on the eve of the 1st Slavic Pride in Moscow.

In June 2007, after the second Moscow Pride, NTV channel featured Alexeyev in its program "Glavnyi geroi".

Also in 2007, Alexeyev produced the documentary Moscow Pride '06, which features the events around the first Moscow Gay Pride Festival from 25 to 28 May 2006. This documentary was included in the official programme of Berlin Film Festival in "Panorama" section in February 2007. Alexeyev and film director Vladimir Ivanov have accumulated hundreds of hours of Russian LGBT events footage. The 2008 documentary film East/West - Sex & Politics, by director Jochen Hick, included in the official programme of Berlin Film Festival in "Panorama" section in February 2008, follows Alexeyev's attempts to organise the 2007 Moscow Gay Pride Festival.

Alexeyev took part in two video programs in the studio of The New Times magazine. In January 2008 he was opposed by Russian film director and actor Nikolay Burlyaev and in June 2008 Alexeyev talked about the preparation and conduct of the third Moscow Pride.

Canadian award-winning documentary film by Bob Christie Beyond Gay: The Politics of Pride features the organisation of the third Moscow Pride in 2008 by Alexeyev and his fellow activists. It also contains footage of Alexeyev's participation in the Gay Parade in São Paulo in May 2008 and images of his arrest during first Moscow Pride on 27 May 2006.

In June 2009, French TV channel France 4 aired the programme "Global Resistance" featuring an 11-minute report about the activities of Alexeyev and his fellow activists from Russia and Belarus organizing first Slavic Gay Pride in Moscow on the day of the Eurovision Song Contest final on 16 May 2009.

On 17 May 2010, the International Day Against Homophobia, Alexeyev took part in the program "Chestnyi ponedelnik" on NTV which was dedicated to sexual minorities in Russia.

Alexeyev made several appearances on the Russian radio channel "Echo Moskvy" to discuss LGBT rights between 2005 and 2010.

2011 Australian documentary by Logan Mucha features the attempts to organize Slavic Gay Pride in Minsk, Belarus, in May 2010 and the role played by Alexeyev.

== Activities ==
=== Fight for gay rights in Russia and Belarus ===
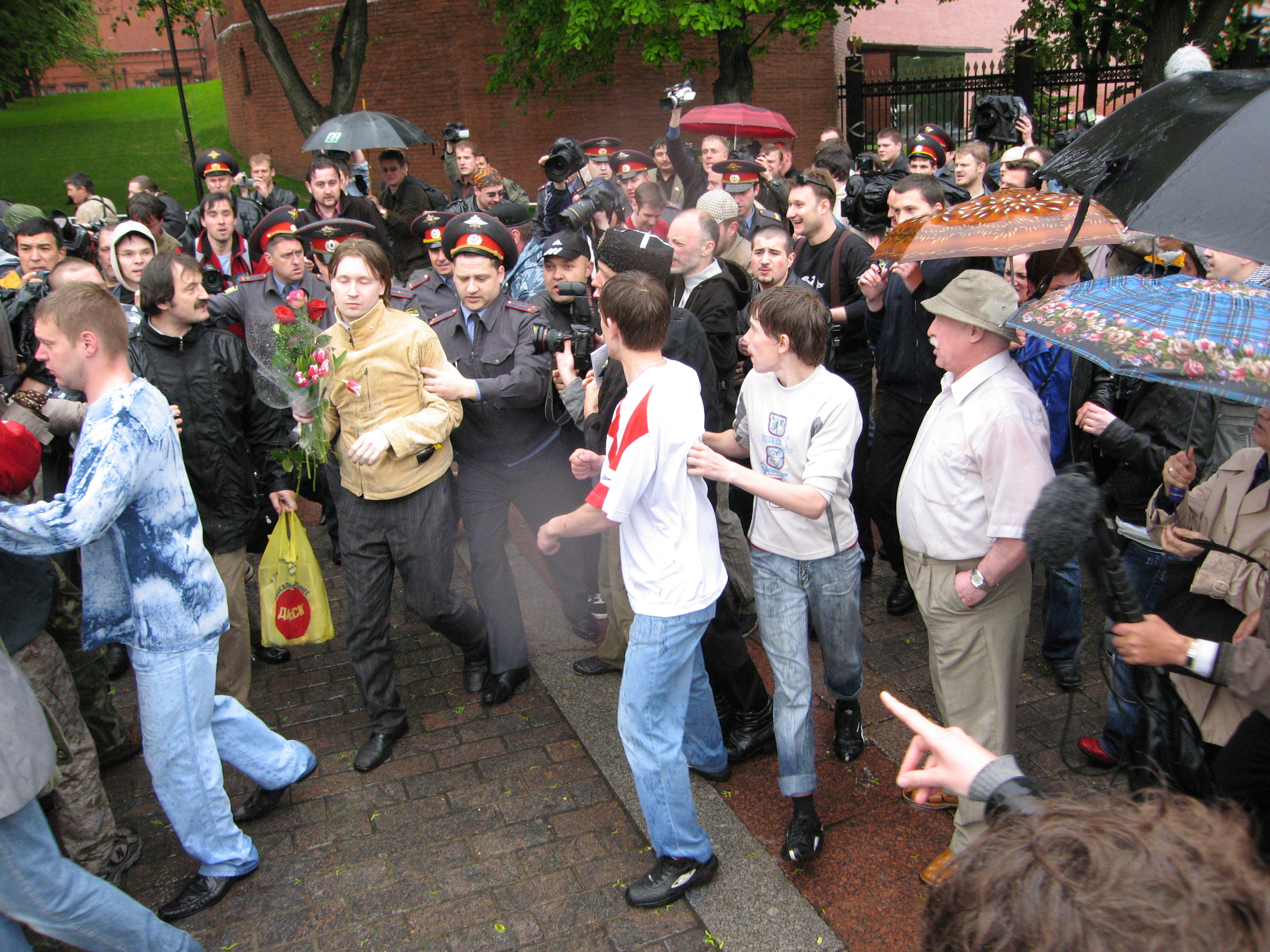
Alexeyev being arrested at the first Moscow Pride, 27 May 2006

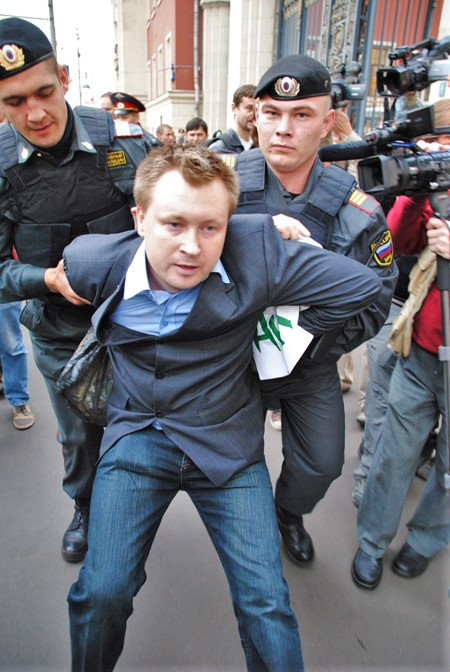
Alexeyev being arrested at Moscow City Hall while protesting against Mayor Yuri Luzhkov on 21 September 2010, one week before his dismissal

July 2005 can be seen as the starting point of Alexeyev's campaign for Freedom of Assembly of gays and lesbians in Russia.

The plans to hold a Gay Pride in Moscow in May 2006 was first revealed by Alexeyev during a joint press conference with Evgenia Debryanskaya, dedicated to the condemnation of the execution of gay minors in Iran. It took place on 28 July 2005 in Moscow at the press center of the National Information Group (NewsInfo). Alexeyev answered a question from a journalist from the Russian news agency Interfax who asked "And what the gay community is planning in Russia?" Alexeyev revealed the plans for the first Gay Pride in Moscow. Within an hour the news spread in Russian and foreign media.

The same day some Russian gay activists condemned the initiative, calling it a "provocation of officials" which was worked out after Alexeyev's visit to the Administration of the Russian President.

The day after the press conference, on 29 July 2005, Interfax contacted the Mayor of Moscow and asked him if he would allow such event in his city. Yuri Luzhkov did not measure the consequences which his answer would create saying that he had not received any application but, should he get one, he would dismiss it. He added that he "stands on the protection of the interests of Moscovites and they categorically would not support such an initiative".

Ever since the announcement of Moscow Pride initiative Alexeyev expressed his readiness to appeal all possible bans of such events by Moscow Mayor in the European Court of Human Rights. Moreover since that time the creation of media interest around Moscow Pride became strategy of Alexeyev which he wanted to use in order to attract maximum attention to the LGBT rights in Russia. The activist suggested that prior to the Moscow Pride initiative Russian media showed gays and lesbians mostly in a negative way.

Uncompromising fight for the conduct of Moscow Pride through banned public manifestations and rigorous legal work based on court appeals against all bans of LGBT public events up to European Court of Human Rights helped to elevate Alexeyev to the position of an informal leader of Russian LGBT community, the way he is frequently called by Russian and foreign media.

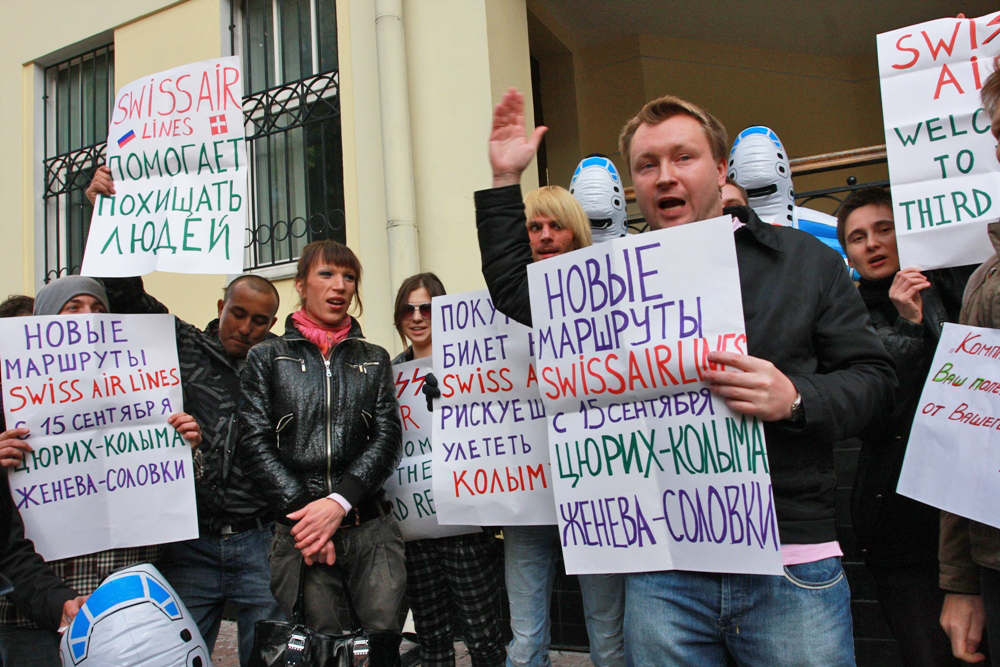
Alexeyev's first authorised protest in Moscow. Picketing of Swiss Air Lines office on 1 October 2010

For five years Alexeyev was the applicant of all public events of Moscow Prides as well as several other public LGBT manifestations in Moscow, Ryazan and Tambov. He was only once allowed by the authorities to demonstrate.

Alexeyev is one of the main ideological opponents of former Moscow Mayor Yuri Luzhkov, who called gay parades "satanic gatherings" and the participants of such events as "faggots". He also called gays weapons of mass distraction of the West and persons, responsible for the HIV epidemic in Moscow.

In February 2007, at the end of the press conference of the summit of London, Paris, Berlin, Moscow and Beijing Mayors at London City Hall Alexeyev unveiled Moscow Pride flag at the back of Yuri Luzhkov while he was giving an interview to the first channel of Russian TV. Mayor's press secretary Sergey Tsoi tried to pull it out but without success. One of the Russian leading daily newspapers "Kommersant" wrote ironically after the incident in London that "Sergey Tsoi tried to take over the gay movement flag from Nikolay Alexeyev". The activist asked Scotland Yard to initiate criminal proceedings against Sergey Tsoi but the case was never opened. Mayors' meeting in London in 2007 was their last official summit.

In November 2008, Alexeyev and three other activists of Moscow Pride travelled to Belarus and hosted a seminar with a group of Belarusian gay and lesbian activists in Minsk. The activists agreed to join efforts and launch the Slavic Pride movement. Alexeyev offered his assistance to Belarusian activists to help raising the awareness about their struggle outside Belarus. Since then he is working with the group Gaybelarus.by and its leader Sergey Androsenko.

In February 2009 Alexeyev invited Sergey Androsenko (Siarhei Androsenka), the leader of Gaybelarus.by to join him and other Russian activists in a tour of European institutions (European Parliament and the European Commission on 12 February, Press Conference in Luxembourg with MP Jean Huss on 13 February, Council of Europe in Strasbourg on 14 February, and United Nations in Geneva on 16–17 February). They also took part in two manifestations in Strasbourg and Geneva trying to attract attention to the violations of the right to freedom of assembly in Russia and Belarus.

On 16 May 2009 the first joint Russian-Belarusian Slavic Pride took place in Moscow. City authorities denied permission for the event and police forces violently dispersed the participants of the manifestation at Vorobyevy Hills. Second Slavic Pride took place in Minsk on 15 May 2010. City authorise also denied permission for the march arresting eight participants in unsanctioned rally. Third Slavic Pride is planned to take place in St. Petersburg on 25 June 2011.

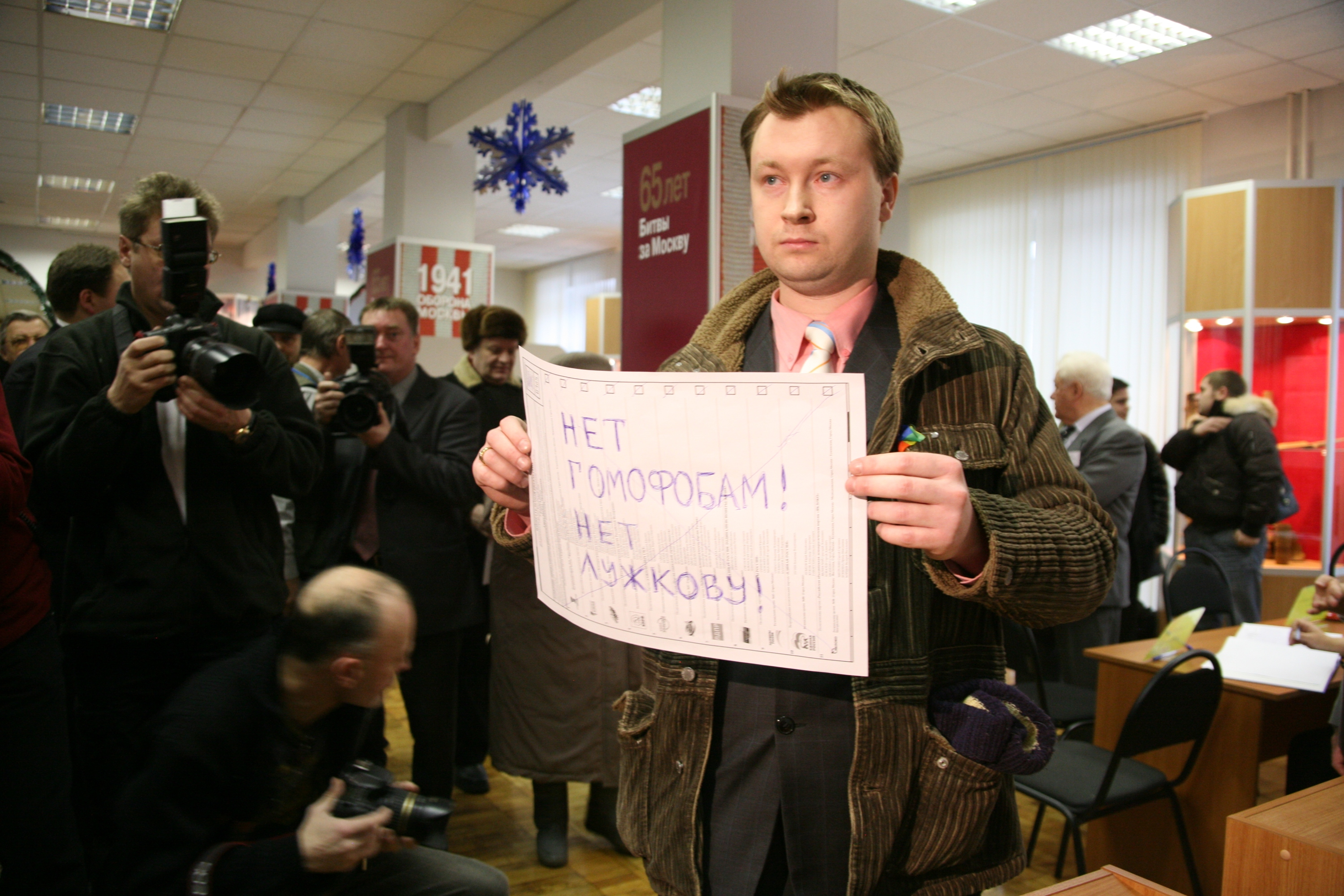
Alexeyev shortly before his arrest after spoiling the ballot paper in State Duma elections: "No to homophobes! No to Luzhkov!, 2 December 2007

During his life in activism Alexeyev was six times arrested by police for the organisation and participation in unsanctioned public events in Moscow: on 27 May 2006 next to the gates of Alexandrovsky Garden during first Moscow Pride, on 27 May 2007 next to Moscow City Hall during second Moscow Pride, on 2 December 2007 at the polling station where Moscow Mayor Yuri Luzhkov was planning to vote in parliamentary elections, on 16 May 2009 during forth Moscow Pride, on 21 September next to Moscow City Hall demanding the resignation of Moscow Mayor on his birthday and on 12 October next to Moscow City Hall while participation in the so called Day of fury.

=== Campaign for same-sex marriages in Russia ===
In May 2009 Alexeyev launched the campaign for the recognition of same-sex marriages in Russia. He became the lawyer and advisor of a lesbian couple, Irina Fedotova (Fet) and Irina Shipitko, who attempted to register their marriage in Tverskoy civil acts registration office of Moscow on 12 May 2009. They were denied and the legality of this decision was later confirmed by Tverskoy district court and Moscow City Court. In October 2009 Alexeyev organized the couple's marriage in Toronto, Canada. In July 2010 two Irinas appealed the Russian ban on same-sex marriages in the European Court of Human Rights.

In November 2009 Alexeyev founded "Marriage Equality Russia" in order to fight for the legalization of same-sex marriages in Russia. In January 2010 Ministry of Justice denied to register the organization citing a number of reasons and giving the reference to the Russian Family Code which defines that the marriage is based on the union between a man and a woman. Gagarinsky District court confirmed the legality of the registration denial citing morality grounds. Moscow City Court has not considered the appeal yet.

=== Campaign against gay blood donation ban in Russia ===
During several years Alexeyev and his fellow activists campaigned for the repeal of the ban on blood donations by homosexual men which was imposed in the regulations of the Russian Health Ministry. On 14 September 2007, gay activists organized an unsanctioned picketing of the Ministry building against the ban. The gathering was dispersed by police forces. The same day Alexeyev and a few other activists attempted to donate their blood in Moscow's Central blood transfusion centre but they were turned away. The result of this campaign came in spring 2008 when the Health Ministry amended its regulations and repealed the ban. It was the first legislative change in favor of homosexual people in Russia since the repeal of criminal prosecution for male homosexual conduct in 1993.

=== Campaign against "homosexual propaganda" ban ===
In March 2009 Alexeyev, together with Moscow Pride activists Nikolay Baev and Irina Fet, launched a campaign against the law of Ryazan region of Russia which prohibit "homosexual propaganda" to minors. Local courts and Russia's Constitutional Court ruled that the limitations are legitimate. This case is currently waiting its consideration in the European Court of Human Rights and the United Nations Human Rights Committee.

=== Fighting hate speech ===
Alexeyev consistently supports criminal prosecution of politicians, officials and public figures for the incitement of hatred towards people on the basis of their sexual orientation and gender identity.

In 2005 he asked for the opening of a criminal case against the leader of "Prezumptsia" committee from Krasnodar Albert Gayamyan for his homophobic statements during an unsanctioned rally in the center of Krasnodar in October 2005. The request was dismissed by the prosecution department. In 2006 Alexeyev, together with activist Nikolay Baev, unsuccessfully tried to achieve criminal prosecution of Russian mufti Talgat Tadjuddin who said in the interview to Interfax that gays, who would show up at the gay parade, should be whipped because the Islamic prophet, Muhammad, called for killings of homosexuals. In 2008 Alexeyev and activists Nikolay Baev and Kirill Nepomnyaschiy asked for criminal prosecution of Tambov region governor Oleg Betin who said in an interview that "gays should be torn and their pieces thrown in the wind". All Russian courts, including the Supreme Court, dismissed the complaints and the activists appealed to the European Court of Human Rights.

=== Campaign against closing of Moscow gay club "Dusha i Telo" ("Body & Soul") ===
In August 2009 Prefect of Moscow's Northern Administrative District Oleg Mitvol announced his intention to get the leading Moscow gay club "Dusha i Telo" closed. Alexeyev and his fellow activists supported the campaign against the closing of the club. In October 2009 Alexeyev organized a press conference in the Independent Press Center where the Russian pop stars, including Lolita Milyavskaya, Shura and "Mirazh" band, talked in support of the persecuted venue. "Dusha i Telo" was closed but later the courts ruled that the termination of the contract was unlawful, though the club never reopened again. In October 2010 Oleg Mitvol was dismissed from the Prefect position.

=== Pride House during Sochi Winter Olympics ===
In August 2010, after his trip to Vancouver and Whistler, Alexeyev announced the plans of his organization to open Pride House of LGBT during Sochi Winter Olympic Games in 2014. While in Canada, he studied similar project, for the first time in Olympics history realized by Vancouver gay activists. The letters of intention to open Pride House in Sochi were sent to the International Olympic Committee and the Organizing Committee of Sochi Olympics.

=== Campaign for the International Day Against Homophobia and Transphobia (IDAHO) ===
Alexeyev's involvement with IDAHO started in April 2005 when he first met with Louis-Georges Tin, founder of the International Day Against Homophobia. He accepted to become the coordinator of the Day in Russia.

The same year he offered to organize the first World Conference of IDAHO in Moscow on 26–27 May 2006 during the "Moscow Pride’06 Festival". The closing press briefing of the conference, which took place three hours before the Moscow Pride, attracted more than 100 journalists and 18 TV crews, giving an unprecedented media tribune both to gay rights in Russia and the IDAHO.

In 2006 Alexeyev became executive secretary of the Paris-based IDAHO Committee when the organization was officially registered in Paris by French authorities. In 2008 he was appointed vice president of IDAHO Committee.

In February 2009 he played a key role in the recognition of the IDAHO in Luxembourg, convincing Jean Huss, a local MP from the Green Party to introduce a motion in Parliament. On 23 April 2009, the motion was unanimously adopted.

Today Alexeyev's activities with IDAHO involve the increase of the network of coordinators around the world, especially in Asia.

=== Court cases against Russian authorities in international institutions ===
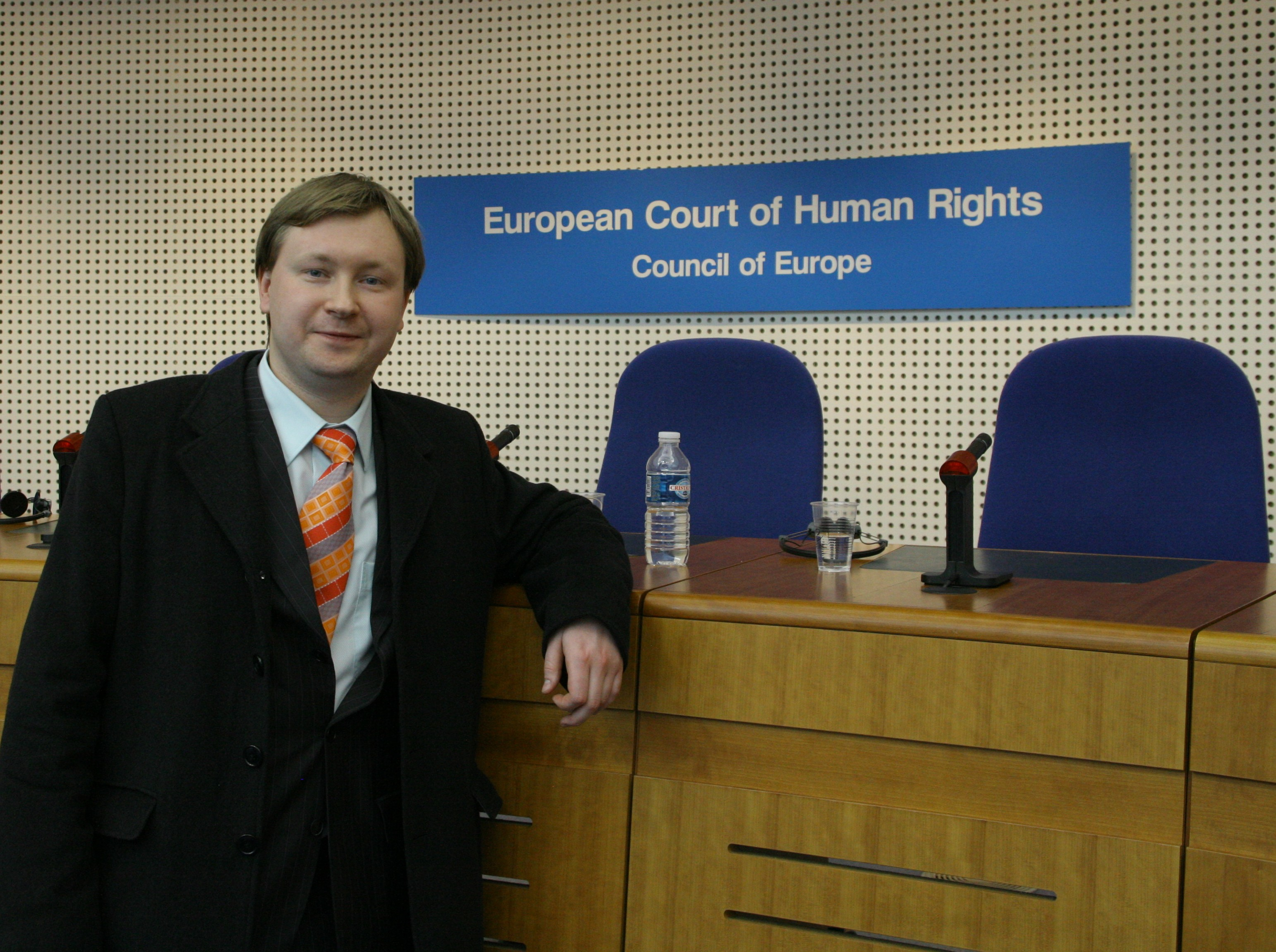
Alexeyev at the European Court of Human Rights where he won the first LGBT case against Russia. 25 February 2010 after ECHR hearing in the case of Schalk & Kopf v. Austria

As of January 2011, Alexeyev had over ten complains against Russia filed and pending at the European Court of Human Rights (Strasbourg, France).

On 14 February 2009, he, together with other Russian, Belarusian and French activists, organized a protest in the centre of Strasbourg to denounce the inaction of the European Court in considering the legality of Moscow Pride bans.

On 21 October 2010, Alexeyev won a case before the European Court concerning prohibition of 2006, 2007 and 2008 Moscow Pride marches and picketings. In Alekseyev v. Russia, the court ruled that Russia breached three articles of the European Convention, including the right to freedom of assembly (Article 11), the right to effective legal remedy (Article 13) and the ban on discrimination (Article 14). The court decided that Russia has to pay to the applicant almost 30,000 euros in compensation. The case marked the first ever international defeat of Russian Government on the issue of gay rights.

As of January 2011, Alexeyev had one complaint pending at the UN Human Rights Committee concerning the ban of a picket in front of the Iranian Embassy on 19 July 2008 in Moscow. The action was a symbolic protest asking for Iran authorities to stop killing homosexual people. In his complaint Alexeyev suggested that by banning the event Russian authorities breached Article 21 of the International Covenant on Civil and Political Rights which guarantees the right to freedom of assembly to everyone. The case was initiated at the UN on 26 March 2009. It is the first time that a case concerning an LGBT topic is sent against Russia to this institution. In April 2009 the UN Human Rights Committee gave Russian authorities 6 months to express their position on the case which was done. As of November 2010, the Committee has yet to take a decision on the admissibility and merits of the case.

=== Politics ===
Alexeyev has never been a member of any political parties or movements, trying not to associate LGBT movement with any political forces in Russia. Nevertheless, on 26 May 2007, during the press conference of second Moscow Pride, he announced his intention to put his candidature forward during the forthcoming parliamentary elections in December 2007. He finally never did it.

In August 2010 Alexeyev and his fellow activists for the first time supported Strategy 31 demonstrations in Moscow which were initiated in support of Article 31 of the Russian Constitution, which guarantees the right to freedom of assembly. At the same time he stressed that gay activists planned to take part in civil protest, not in political demonstration.

=== Domodedovo Airport arrest ===
On 15 September 2010, Alexeyev was arrested at Domodedovo Airport in Moscow as he was boarding a Swiss International Air Lines flight to Geneva. The ostensible reason for the arrest was not clear. Over the subsequent days, the Interfax Belarus news agency reported receiving text messages from him declaring he was seeking political asylum in Belarus and was abandoning his lawsuits regarding the suppression of Moscow Pride. However, LGBT rights activists raised doubts, saying the messages were out of character and wondering, if he had his cell phone, why he had not telephoned his partner or LGBT activists in Minsk. Finally, Alexeyev resurfaced in Moscow, contacting Moscow LGBT activists as well as German MP Volker Beck by phone, telling them he was never in Minsk and had not abandoned the lawsuits.

The arrest sparked complaints internationally, including by British MEP Sarah Ludford; a protest was held in front of the Russian Embassy in Berlin, and activists in the US were urged to telephone the Russian Embassy.

=== Incidents of antisemitism ===
In August 2013, Alexeyev drew criticism for a series of antisemitic comments posted on his personal Twitter and Facebook. Alexeyev first re-tweeted comments describing Advocate magazine editor Matthew Breen as a "Jewish pig" and an "Israeli monkey", referring to OUT Magazine as a "Jewish slut magazine that supports Jews and their filthy faggotry [sic] propaganda." He then tweeted and posted on Facebook several of his own comments about Jewish vodka being distilled and purified from sperm. Following these comments, Human Rights First cancelled a conference call with Alexeyev. Alexeyev was also criticized by Galha LGBT Humanists. In response to the controversy, he subsequently tweeted and posted on Facebook a large number of comments criticizing the "Jewish mafia", "yids" and "kikes" who he claimed were "trying to overtake the world" and criticised Peter Tatchell's "Love Russia, Hate Homophobia" campaign, suggesting it should be changed to "Love Jews. Hate yids (kikes)!" Although it was originally believed that his Facebook account may have been compromised or hacked following an alleged kidnapping and drugging from Putin's security forces, later comments by Alexseyev proved otherwise, as when confronted with the accusation that he was being antisemitic, he "continued his defense for over three minutes, detailing that he has Jewish friends, and adding that his mother's stepmother was Jewish, and people he works with are Jewish" which, TheNewCivilRightsMovement.com continued to state, "is an unfortunate line of defense as the irony is clear. Who hasn't heard as a defense of bigotry, "Some of my best friends are (insert oppressed minority name here)"?"

He also issued death threats to Michael Lucas, a Jewish American–Russian–Israeli LGBT activist, actor and CEO of the gay adult entertainment studio Lucas Entertainment. This was in response to an article by Lucas describing Alexeyev as the Kremlin's "pocket gay" who "can no longer be trusted as an advocate for LGBT Russians". Following this, Alexeyev claimed to quit LGBT activism in Russia forever.

== Personal life ==
On 5 September 2008, Alexeyev became the first public figure in Russia's history to enter into a same-sex family union. The marriage ceremony took place in Geneva City Hall on the basis of the Swiss Federal Law on registered partnership. He has lived with his partner, a Swiss citizen named Pierre, since November 1999.

In a 2006 interview Alexeyev called himself an Orthodox Christian, though he noted that he thinks about converting to Buddhism for it being "the World's most tolerant religion".

Alexeyev is fluent in English and French. His hobbies include traveling and sports.

== Quotes ==
- "Conformism and passivism are now behind us. We managed to generate passion and hope this finds its way into the hearts of many LGBT people in Russia and to revive the spirit of activism"
- "I thought that the main problem in the gay community is the lack of funding, I was wrong. The essential quality that this movement needs is courage and an ideal; without an ideal, nothing is possible."
- "You cannot work on human rights, you can only live with human rights issues. Fighting for human rights cannot be a job. Fighting for human rights is an ideal"

== See also ==
- Alexey Davydov, contemporary pro-LGBTQ activist in Russia
- Olympic protests of Russian anti-gay laws
- Recognition of same-sex unions in Russia
