= Gayrussia.ru =

LGBT rights organization in Russia

LGBT Human Rights Project Gayrussia.ru
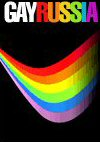
- Gayrussia.ru Logo
- Founded: 2005
- Founder: Nikolai Alekseev
- Purpose: Visibility of LGBT and Advocacy for LGBT Rights
- Location: Russia
- Origins: Российский правозащитный ЛГБТ-проект GayRussia.Ru
- Method: Networking, Campaigning, Advocacy, Outreach, Community Media, TV and Radio
- Members: 25
- Key people: Nikolai Alekseev (head), Nikolai Baev, Irina Fet, Anton Sutyagin, Yuri Gavrikov
- Website: http://www.gayrussia.ru/en/

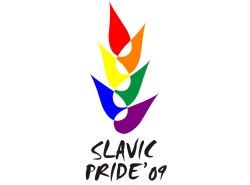
Slavic Pride Logo

Gayrussia.ru is an LGBT rights organization based in Moscow, Russia. It has organised numerous public actions in Russia, the most famous being Moscow Pride and Slavic Pride. It also sponsored the documentary Moscow Pride '06. In November 2008, Project GayRussia.Ru extended its advocacy work into Belarus where it launched the Slavic Gay Pride movement with its local partner Gaybelarus.by.

Its website www.gayrussia.ru (no longer functional) features Russian LGBT news in English and World LGBT news in Russian. It is also used to advertise the organization's campaigns and advocacy work. The website www.gayrussia.ru is frequently read by those seeking news about LGBT rights issues in Russia. As of June 2026, the website appears to be unreachable.

GayRussia.Ru tracked and revealed the homophobia of various Russian politicians and public figures, including the mayor of Moscow, Yuri Luzhkov. The page also gives practical advice for visiting Russia.

== Main goal ==
The organization, headed by Nikolai Alekseev, was created to fight discrimination based on sexual orientation and gender identity in Russia. It does this by campaigning publicly in an attempt to get LGBT issues into the media and change Russian public opinion on them.

In February 2009, the organization revealed its motto: "Gay Equality, No Compromise."

== Organization ==
=== Origins ===
Project GayRussia.Ru was launched in Moscow on 17 May 2005 by Nikolai Alekseev on the first International Day Against Homophobia. He founded the organization because no progress had been made since the decriminalisation of male homosexuality in Russia in 1993.

=== Structure ===
As a non-registered organization, it operates under article 3 of the Federal Law on public association which states : "Public organisations created by citizens can be registered in accordance with the current Federal Law and acquire the rights of registered legal body or can function without state registration and acquiring of the rights of registered legal body." The organization does not receive any funding and it has neither a bank account nor any property.

=== Key people ===
Nikolai Alekseev is the current leader of Project GayRussia. Among other activists are Nikolaj Bajev who writes articles and attends international LGBT conferences, Irina Fet who attempted to marry her partner in Moscow on 12 May 2009, Anton Sutyagin who coordinates the organization in Belarus and Yuri Gavrikov who is in charge of the logistics of the campaigns. Dmitri Bartnev is the organisation's lawyer. Gayrussia.ru is run by a rotating group of approximately 20 to 30 activists.

=== Membership ===
Project GayRussia.Ru is a Member of the IDAHO Committee (the International Day Against Homophobia), InterPride (the International Association of LGBT Pride Organizers), the EPOA (European Pride Organizers Association). It is also the founding member of the Slavic Pride movement.

== Campaigns ==
Project GayRussia.Ru has launched five main campaigns since its founding. One was successfully closed in 2008. The most famous ongoing campaign is for Freedom of Assembly which is often referred to by the media as the "Moscow Pride battle".

=== Campaign for Freedom of Assembly ===
As of July 2009, not a single LGBT public action on a street has been authorized in any city of Russia.

In July 2005, Project GayRussia.Ru launched the Moscow Pride Initiative which was announced by Nikolai Alekseev during a press conference held in Moscow. The mayor of Moscow, Yuri Luzhkov said on several occasions that he will not authorize any public action by gays in the streets of the Russian capital. Moscow Pride took place despite the bans on 27 May 2006, 27 May 2007, 1 June 2008 and 16 May 2009. Activists were arrested every year in front of members of the main international media. Reports of the events were made around the world.

Project GayRussia.Ru also extended its campaign outside Moscow and attempted to organize street public actions in Tambov in October 2008, and Ryazan in April 2009.

The organization systematically appealed any of its banned actions through the Russian courts before sending it to the European Court of Human Rights in Strasbourg, France. Not a single case was won in Russia. Russian judges denied taking into consideration the different cases set as a precedent by the European Court when making their decision. In the case of Bączkowski v Poland the Court ruled that the ban of the Warsaw Pride in 2005 was a violation of the European Convention on Human Rights, which was ratified by the Russian Federation in 1998.

As of July 2009, 168 banned events are pending consideration in seven different cases at the European Court.

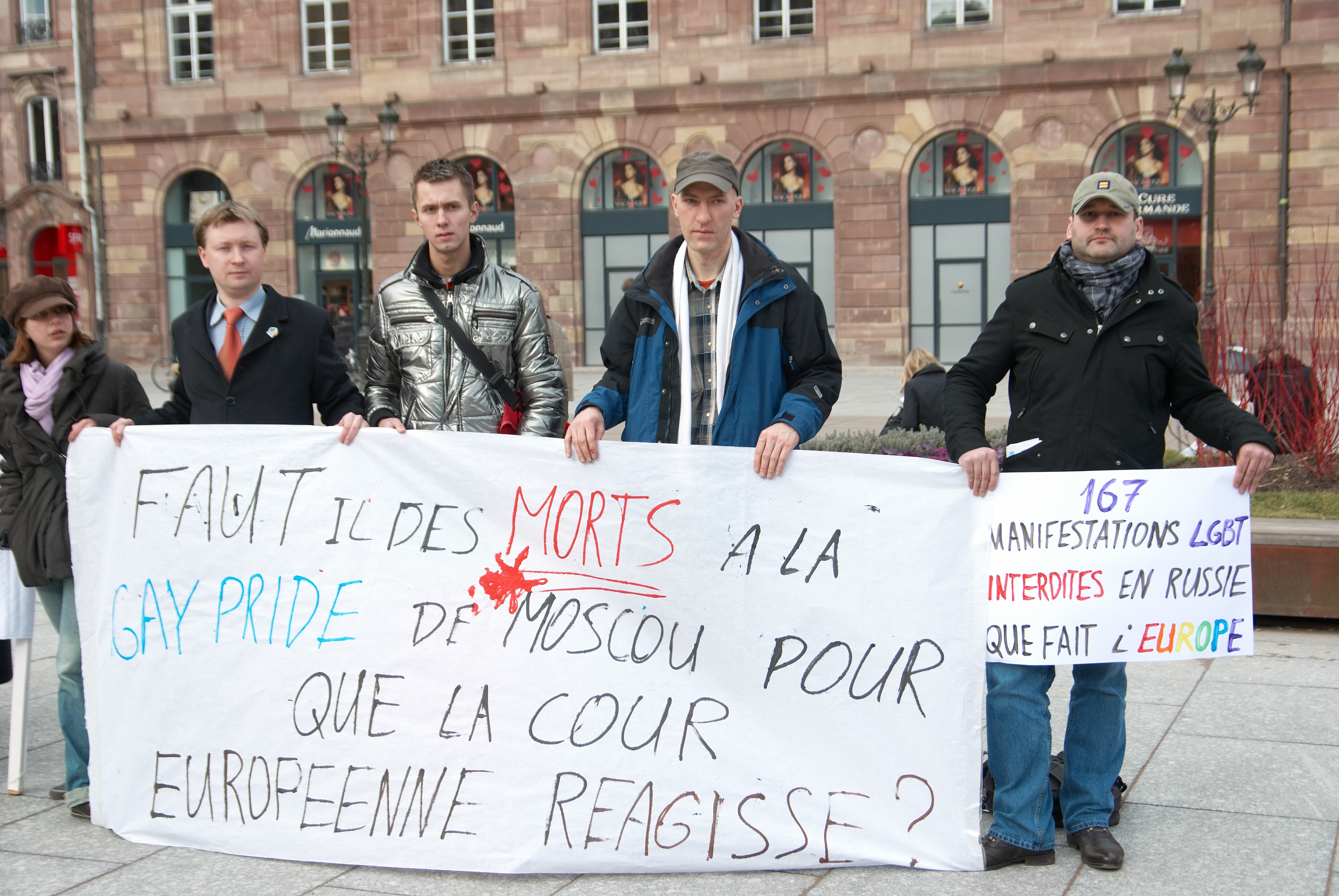
Protest organized by GayRussia and TaPaGes in Strasbourg, France, 14 February 2009

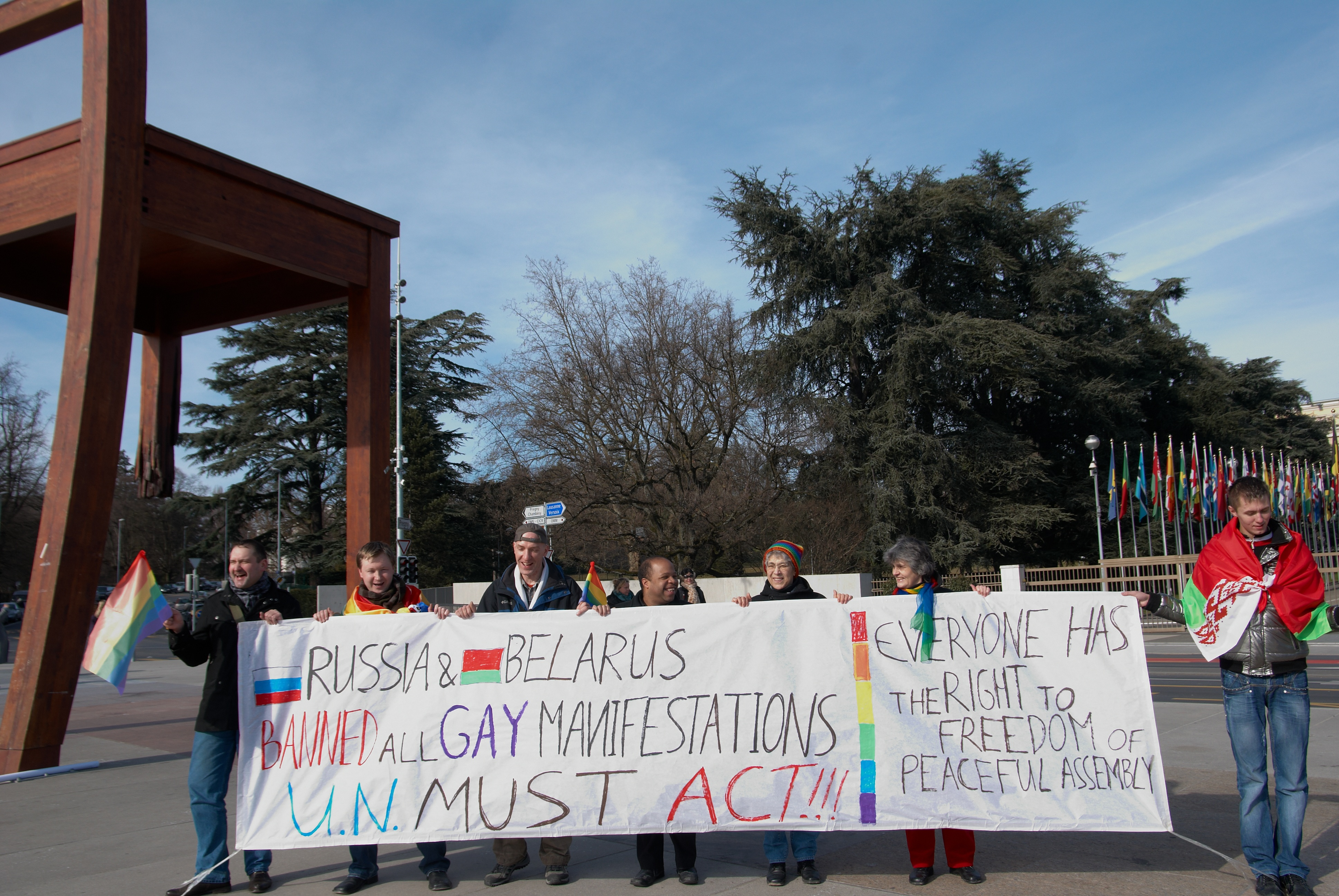
Protest organized by GayRussia at the United Nations in Geneva, Switzerland, 16 February 2009

On 14 February 2009, activists from Project Gayrussia.ru and Project gaybelarus.by joined with activists from local LGBT group TaPaGeS and organised a protest in the centre of Strasbourg asking the European Court to speed up the consideration of their complaints, the oldest being sent in January 2007.

On 19 July 2006 and 19 July 2007, a protest organized by Project Gayrussia.ru in front of the Iranian Embassy with the aim "to attract attention to the execution of minors and ask for the repeal of death penalty" was authorized by the Prefecture of the Central Administrative area of Moscow.

The application was not explicitly referring to a gay protest. However, the same protest was banned in July 2008 and July 2009 after the words "and homosexuals" was added in the application.

In April 2009, Project GayRussia.Ru decided to take the ban of the July 2008 protest to the UN Human Rights Committee. The organisation's aim is ultimately to get a ruling against Russia both at the European Court of Human Rights and at the UN Human Rights Committee. In its final report, the committee expressed its concerns about violence against lesbian, gay, bisexual and transgender (LGBT) persons as well as the systematic discrimination on the basis of sexual orientation including hate speech by public officials, religious leaders and in the media. The committee also expressed its concerns over the infringement of the right to freedom of assembly and freedom of association.

=== Campaign for lifting ban on blood donation by gay people ===
In April 2006, Project GayRussia.Ru asked the General Prosecution and the Minister of Health to amend the instruction on blood donors released by the Minister of Health on 14 September 2001 which includes homosexuals as part of the HIV high risk group.

In July 2006, the General Prosecution recognised that there is nothing in the law which prevents gays from donating their blood. Instead, the law only defines a list of diseases that can prevent the donation of blood. As a result, it asked the Ministry of Health to remove homosexuals from its instruction.

In April 2007, Project GayRussia.Ru sent a reminder to the General Prosecution and the Ministry of Health as the instruction had not been amended.

On 14 September 2007, Project GayRussia.Ru organized a protest in front of the Minister of Health asking for the instruction to be amended. It took place despite having been banned by the authorities, and several activists were arrested. The same day Nikolai Alekseev attempted to give his blood at a transfusion centre in Moscow. He was denied. The denial was recorded by several members of the media who were covering the event. In May 2008, the Ministry of Health wrote to Project GayRussia.Ru and confirmed that it had finally removed homosexuals from its instruction. As of July 2013, this campaign still marks the only discrimination against homosexuals repealed in Russia since the decriminalisation of male same sex relations in 1993.

=== Campaign to end ban on HIV+ foreigners entering country ===
In February 2009, Project GayRussia.Ru initiated a campaign for the cancellation of article 10 of the 1995 law on the prevention of the distribution of HIV in Russia, which bans HIV-positive foreigners from staying in Russia for more than three months. The organisation asked the president, the prime minister and the foreign affairs minister to stop asking foreign visa applicants for their HIV status.

=== Campaign against regional law to forbid propaganda of homosexuality to minors ===
On 24 May 2006, the local parliament of the region of Ryazan added to the list of administrative offences: "Section 3.13. Public actions oriented to propaganda of homosexuality (male and female) among minor children."

In March 2009, activists of Project GayRussia.Ru launched a campaign asking for the law to be repealed. On 30 March 2009, Nikolai Baev and Ira Fet were arrested in Ryazan and charged for exposing propaganda on homosexuality to minors after they stood next to a local school with banners reading "Homosexuality is normal" and "I am homosexual and proud of it." They were released and sentenced to a fine. Nikolai Baev appealed his arrest to the European Court of Human Rights while Irina Fet appealed to the UN Human Rights Committee. Nikolai Alekseev appealed the case of the banned March to the same Court. In January 2010, the Constitutional Court gave a decision against the three activists who claimed that the law was unconstitutional. In April 2010, the UN Human Rights Committee opened the case of Irina Fet and started communicating with both parties. As of June 2010, the European Court of Human Rights has not yet open the case. The organization also appealed for one march and one picket which were denied. The aim was to be able to challenge the constitutionality of the law at the level of the Constitutional Court and European Court of Human Rights.

== Organization of International Events ==
In 2006, Project GayRussia.Ru organized the 1st Moscow Pride Festival from 25 to 27 May despite protests.

In 2007, Project GayRussia.Ru organized the 2nd Moscow Pride Festival from 26 to 27 May.

In 2008, Project GayRussia.Ru did not organize a festival. The 3rd Moscow Pride took place in the form of 2 street actions.

In 2009, Project GayRussia.Ru organized the 1st Slavic Pride Festival in Moscow from 14 to 17 May.

In 2010, Project GayRussia.Ru co-organized with Gaybelarus.by the 2nd Slavic Pride Festival in Minsk from 14 to 16 May and the 5th Moscow Pride on 26 May.

== LGBT conference in Minsk on 26 September 2009 ==
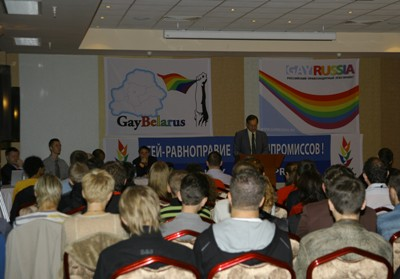
Photo of the 5th LGBT Conference in Minsk, Belarus, on 26 September 2009, taken at the Crowne Plazza Hotel.

On 26 September 2009, Gayrussia hosted with its partner gaybelarus an LGBT human rights conference in the five-star hotel Crown Plaza in Minsk. Participants came from nine different cities in Belarus, and from 10 European countries, representing more than 30 organisations. The Conference was held under the patronage of International Day Against Homophobia. The delegation of the European Commission to Belarus gave its political support to the event. Mr Jean-Eric Holzapfel, head of the delegation, insisted in his opening speech on the necessity to fight homophobia in Europe and in Belarus in particular. Also, representatives of the Swedish, French and Hungarian Embassies as well as a representative of the NGO Global Rights Defenders (ex-Swedish Helsinki Committee) were present as observers. The conference delegates discussed and adopted a joint resolution on the rights of gays, lesbians, bisexuals and transgender persons in Belarus. The text, which will be sent to President Alexander Lukashenko, the government and the parliament, is calling for a ban on discrimination on the basis of sexual orientation and gender identity, the prosecution of hate speech, the recognition of equal rights of same-sex couples, and the recognition of 17 May as the Day Against Homophobia. It further asked the authorities to provide support in organizing Slavic Pride in Minsk in May 2010.

== LGBT Barometer poll ==
In 2005, Project GayRussia.Ru initiated an "LGBT barometer" to monitor the attitude of Russians towards homosexuals. The poll was undertaken by the Independent Centre Levada. It took place in Spring 2005, Spring 2006 and Spring 2007. It was discontinued from 2008 onward due to a lack of funding. However, Project GayRussia.Ru ordered a poll in Belarus in October 2009.

== LGBT news agency ==
Project GayRussia.Ru operates as an informal news agency, providing information directed to the LGBT community in English and in Russian. This channel also served to publicise the activities of the organization. As of December 2008, Project GayRussia.Ru reported the publication of over 5,000 articles and had received 10 million hits on its website.

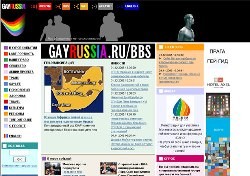
Screenshot website Gayrussia.ru

In Russia, its news is often republished by news agency Interfax, radio Echo of Moscow, and internet portal Lenta.ru, and Newsru.com.

Outside Russia, its news is republished by news agency AFP, AP and numerous LGBT magazines and internet portals such as Tetu, E-llico Illico, Yagg (France), The Advocate, 365gay.com, Queerty (USA), (UK), Pinknews (UK).

In 2005, Project GayRussia.Ru established a partnership with the LGBT news site UKGayNews.

In 2009, Project GayRussia.Ru established a partnership with Gay-Radio.ru, the main Gay Radio broadcast in Russian over the Internet.

In 2010, Project GayRussia.Ru launched an online radio GayRussia-radio which is available on stream on its Internet page.

== Recognition and awards ==
In March 2006, Project GayRussia.Ru was an Iron Donor of the XXIII ILGA World Conference which took place in Geneva, Switzerland.

In May 2009, Project GayRussia.Ru was awarded the Golden Heart Award from the Phnom Penh (Cambodia) LGBT Pride Festival in recognition of its support for the organization.

Project GayRussia.Ru was awarded the Europahøjskolen Prize (Denmark) in December 2009 for its work for the rights of minorities in Russia.

See Reputation and Awards of Nikolai Alekseev for other Awards attributed personally to him for his involvement with Project GayRussia.

A retrospective of the work accomplished by the organization from May 2005 until December 2008 is available at GayRussia Celebrates Three and a Half Years of Gay Activism.

== See also ==
- Nikolai Alekseev
- Gaybelarus.by
- Russian LGBT network
- LGBT rights in Russia
