= GayBelarus =

Belarusian LGBT organisation

- Founded: 18 January 2009
- Founder: Sergey Androsenko; Siarhei Pradzed
- Purpose: LGBT rights and visibility
- Location: Belarus
- Website: gaybelarus.by

GayBelarus (founded 2009) is a national LGBT rights organisation in Belarus. The organisation has branches in all regions of the Republic of Belarus: Brest, Grodno, Gomel, Vitebsk, Mogilev and Minsk.

== Purpose ==
=== Objectives ===
- Contribution to full LGBT human rights implementation provided by law of the Republic of Belarus (including the international agreements confirmed by the Republic of Belarus)
- Decreasing levels of homophobia and transphobia and increasing tolerance towards LGBT people
- Social and psychological support of LGBT people, their family members, and the surrounding community

=== Activities ===
GayBelarus hosts the annual human rights forum Minsk Pride, as well as national LGBT conferences. It provides legal assistance and psychological care for members of the LGBT community. It operates the Jáhada (Belarusian: Ягада, literally Berry) a website providing information for queer people. The organisation regularly reports to international organisations on the state of LGBT issues in Belarus, submits information for the alternative Universal Periodic Review at the UN, and initiates strategic litigations concerning human rights violations violations towards LGBT people. The organisation also supports cultural activities, arranges film shows, LGBT parties, roundtables to discuss current and strategic issues, and other consolidation activities.

== History ==
=== 2009 ===
GayBelarus was founded on 18 January 2009 with the goal of providing necessary aid and support for lesbians, gays, bisexuals, and transgender people and their families and friends.

==== The Month against Homophobia ====
The Belarusian campaign against homophobia was one of GayBelarus' first large-scale, public events. It began in Minsk, on April 17, 2009. The campaign involved several events, the first of which was the premiere of Fish Cannot Fly, a documentary about LGBT Christians. This was followed by debates on faith, religion, Christianity, Protestantism, and fundamentalist churches.

As a result of the campaign, the Belarusian party The Greens (BPG) announced the establishment of the Commission on Lesbian, Gay, Bisexual and Transgender (LGBT) rights. They were the first Belarusian party to have such a commission in their structure.

LiveJournal called the campaign the second most important cultural project in 2009.

==== Day of Silence ====
In April 2009, human rights activists from GayBelarus, the Belarusian Initiative for Sexual and Gender Equality, with the support of the public association Young Social Democrats (Young Gramada), held a public Day of Silence in Minsk in the form of a silent flashmob. Participants taped their mouths shut and handed out information leaflets about what homophobia is and why society needs to deal with it. While handing out the leaflets, participants were approached by two police officers with a request to show them the flyers. After looking through the anti-homophobia leaflets for a few minutes, the policemen came to conclusion that the action can continue, but the protesters should peel the tape off their mouths.

==== 5th National Belarusian LGBT Conference ====
On September 26 2009, the "LGBT - movement and non-governmental institutions" conference was held in Minsk. It focused on cooperation with NGOs and civil society to overcome homophobia in Belarus. GayBelarus collaborated with the organisation GayRussia.Ru to initiate the event. The conference was attended by representatives of some political parties, as well as a wide range of NGOs and civil initiatives, including some anarchists.

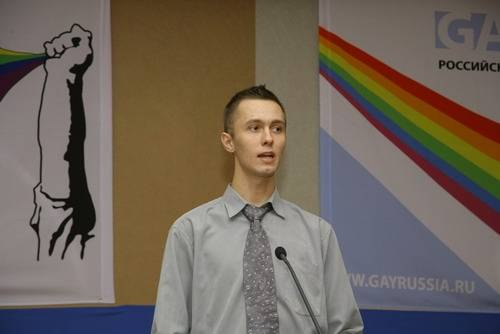
Sergey Androsenko

Speakers included:

- Louis Georges Tin – Founder of IDAHO
- Sergey Androsenko – Head of GayBelarus
- Nikolai Alexeyev – Head of GayRussia.Ru
- Jean-Eric Holzapfel – Head of the European Commission in Belarus
- Tatiana Gotsura – Deputy Chairman of the Belarusian Helsinki Committee
- Tatiana Revyaka – representative of the Viasna Human Rights Centre
- Igor Borisov – Head of Narodnaya Hramada, the Belarusian Social Democratic Party's Core Values Commission
- Oleg Novikov – Head of The Greens
- Oleg Eremin – Head of the national NGO Vstrecha
- Katsiaryna Pytleva – First Musical Channel VJ
- Alexander Polujan – Head of Gay.By

Participants from more than 30 organisations took part in the event. The conference was also attended by several observers - diplomats from Sweden, France and Hungary, as well as a representative of the Swedish human rights organisation Civil Rights Defenders.

At the end of the conference, the participants were asked to vote on a resolution demanding that the President, Alexander Lukashenko, and the Government should amend Belarusian legislation. The participants asked to add the concepts of sexual orientation and gender identity to the list of illegal grounds for discrimination, to make amendments to the criminal law in order to legally prohibit incitement of hatred and hostility on grounds of sexual orientation or gender identity, and to equal the human rights of the same-sex and opposite-sex couples.

==== Action in defence of Iranian convicts sentenced to death for sodomy ====
On December 16, 2009, GayBelarus held a protest in Minsk in defence of gay Iranian convicts who were sentenced to death for sodomy.

Protestors picketed outside of the Iranian Embassy in Belarus. The picketing only lasted 15 minutes, as the participants managed to pass their petition directly to the Ambassador of Iran. Subsequently, the protestors, as well as a reporter for the independent newspaper Nasha Niva, were detained. The reporter was released after getting her press card checked. Meanwhile, the protestors were charged for arranging or holding meetings, rallies, street processions, demonstrations, picketing, and other large-scale public actions.

=== 2010 ===
==== Monitoring of LGBT Discrimination ====
Monitoring discrimination towards LGBT people in Belarus from 2007 to 2009 was the first special-purpose complex study of the legal state of the Belarusian LGBT community. From 2010, GayBelarus carried out the monitoring with assistance from the Belarusian Initiative for Sexual and Gender Equality.

The monitoring was meant to inform the Belarusian public of the ways in which LGBT Belarusians' human rights are violated. The other goal was to develop recommendations for overcoming these violations so that queer Belarusians could fully enjoy their human rights. GayBelarus developed these recommendations for the Republic of Belarus and Belarusian NGOs, suggesting measures that should be taken to reduce homophobia in Belarus and increase the efficiency at which the state could guarantee rights and freedoms for all its citizens, regardless of sexual orientation or gender identity.

==== GAY: GoodAsYou magazine launch ====
On the night from 27 to 28 February 2010 a launch was held for the first edition of the Belarusian LGBT magazine GAY: GoodAsYou, whose Chief Editor was GayBelarus activist Sergei Praded. The magazine aimed to reveal the entire spectrum of gay people's lives, to show the diversity and richness of Belarusian gay and lesbian lives. The launch was held in a club in Minsk, and was attended by more than 200 people.

==== Meeting with BSU students ====
On April 9, 2010, GayBelarus representatives and Slavic Gay Pride organisers held a meeting with Belarusian State University students from the Departments of Psychology and Journalism. During, the event, participants watched the movie "La mala educación" ("Bad Education") by Pedro Almodóvar. Among the experts at the meeting were human rights defender Siarhei Androsenka, culture expert Oleg Grubich, and psychologist Varvara Krasutskaya.

==== Day of Silence in Minsk ====
On April 25, 2010, GayBelarus activists marched along Nezavisimosti Avenue (Independence Avenue) from the Belarusian State Philharmonic building to Gorky Park (the central children's park), handing out leaflets with information about the dangers of homophobia in what was called "The Day of Silence". This took place alongside the Republic of Belarus's local council elections, which increased the probability of protesters being arrested. However, there were no incidents involving the authorities. The participants managed to hand out all of their flyers throughout the hour and a half event.

==== International Coming-Out Day ====
On October 11, 2010, there was an event held in Minsk for International Coming-Out Day. The 10 people who took part in the event turned up with rainbow symbols, and passed along the central streets of Minsk. One of the participants was detained by the riot police (SWAT) on duty. The arrested activist was fined and detained for the night in the detention centre on Okrestsin Street in Minsk.

=== 2011 ===
==== Training workshop and debate club ====
In February 2011, GayBelarus organized a training workshop called "Citizen and Public Order. Legal and psychological aspects," as well as a debate club "Gay Pride—pros and cons. Activism is . . .". Both were carried out in Minsk. Debaters discussed several key topics such as a Gay Pride in Minsk. The debates also included topics including the life of gays in Belarus, stereotypes about gay activists, the role of activists in the community, and the work that activists should do.

==== First authorized picket against homophobia ====
On February 14 2011, a group of activists of the Belarusian LGBT community held the first authorized anti-homophobia rally in Belarus. People gathered near the Ministry of Justice of the Republic of Belarus. Due to the cold weather, the event only took place for 10–15 minutes. The participants were holding posters which said "To love a person you want is a human right", "Equal rights without a compromise", "Homophobia is a disgrace to the country" and "Belarus without homophobes".

==== East Bloc Love ====
In March 2011, Australian film director Logan Mucha filmed the documentary East Bloc Love, which featured GayBelarus and gay activist Sergey Yenin. The film premiered in 2011 at the Frameline LGBT Film Festival in San Francisco, and was later screened at a number of film festivals including Movies That Matter. The film won the prize for Best Documentary at the Merlinka Film Festival in Belgrade.

==== Film screenings in Vitebsk ====
Since April 2011, GayBelarus organised regular LGBT film screenings in Vitebsk. However, the coordinator was subjected to pressure by the local authorities and charged with organising of the so-called silent protests in Vitebsk. As a result, he stopped these weekly film screenings.

==== Information campaign in support of LGBT ====
On May 17, 2011, activists from GayBelarus and the Young social democrats (Maladaya Hramada) intended to hold an information event where they wanted to disseminate leaflets about legalising gay relationships in Belarus.

The event was to begin near the House of Officers close to the Executive Office of the President of the Republic of Belarus—a traditional meeting point for gays and lesbians in Minsk. As the group of young people gathered and went towards Nezalezhnasti Avenue, they were surrounded by police officers in civilian clothes. Special forces were called, arriving 2–3 minutes later, and they detained 15 people. After two and a half hours, all detainees were freed without drawing any reports. Four complaints about the police officers’ actions were made by the detainees, including one regarding the unlawful taking of personal belongings.

==== Founding meeting ====
(The first attempt to get registered)

On October 15 2011, the founding meeting of GayBelarus was held in Minsk and signed the charter of the organisation, elected its chair, councillors, and members of the review committee. As the words "Belarus" or "Belarusian" cannot be used in a name of an organisation unless it is endorsed by the government, the decided name was the "Human Rights Centre Alternative Plus".

In late December, the registration was rejected due to formal reasons. The letter from the Ministry of Justice stated that the founders of the organization had provided a wrong date of birth of one of the 61 founders and made a spelling mistake in the name of another founder. This inconsistency was later reflected in the monitoring of the legal status of the Belarusian nongovernmental organizations.

==== Other activities ====
- In June 2011, the ban to hold a Slavic Gay Pride 2010 was appealed in the Supreme Court of the Republic of Belarus. The course of events for Slavic pride were reflected on in a report about Belarus titled Human rights in today’s world by Amnesty International.
- From September to October 2011, regional offices of GayBelarus were opened in Brest, Grodno, Gomel, and Vitebsk.
- In October 2011, the game Searching for tolerance was held, arranged by GayBelarus and the Union of the Belarusian Students.

=== 2012 ===
==== International Week of Actions against Racism and Xenophobia ====
On 17 March 2012, GayBelarus held an action in the centre of Minsk dedicated to the International Day for the Elimination of Racial Discrimination and the European Week against Racism and Xenophobia. This involved a sprint flash mob. At the end, the participants left two toys and a bag with some glued on stickers against racism, xenophobia and the death penalty. The reason this action was so rapid and roughly formatted was because the Minsk local authorities had banned peaceful LGBT campaigns. The activists also handed out leaflets on the subway, and arranged a film screening and debates on the death penalty.

==== Free Will Day ====
On 25 March 2012, 15 human rights activists from GayBelarus appeared with rainbow flags at the procession of the Belarusian democratic opposition in Minsk, dedicated to Free Will Day. The organisers did not intervene with the LGBT procession.

==== Chernobyl Path ====
On 26 April 2012, the GayBelarus activists took part in the annual procession of the Belarusian opposition: the Chernobyl Path. The activists were holding rainbow flags and walked along with the other participants.

There was an incident when a young man tried to pull out two rainbow flags out of the gay activists’ hands.

==== The Month Against Homophobia and Transphobia ====
May 2012 was the Month Against Homophobia and Transphobia. During the month, several events were held, including the round table "LGBT and Education" and a number of film screenings. The project activists also placed stickers which called for tolerance. The Minsk City Executive Committee did not allow any public action in support of a tolerant attitude towards the LGBT community. Nevertheless, GayBelarus, together with the Society of Belarusian Students, held a public action in Minsk. During the event, the participants handed out cards with information on equality and the diversity of Belarusian society.

==== Founding Congress of GayBelarus ====
(second attempt of registration)

On 8 December 2012, in Minsk, the founding congress of the National Youth Public Association, Human Rights Center Lambda, was held. This was the name under which GayBelarus wanted to legalize their activities. Sergey Androsenko was elected president and Maxim Dmitriev his deputy.

The congress was attended by 72 delegates from all the regions of the Republic of Belarus and Minsk. They adopted the articles of the association and elected its governing bodies. The aims set out for the organisation were mainly to provide various kinds of legal assistance for lesbian, gay, bisexual, and transgender people. After the congress, an application was filed to the Ministry of Justice with a request to register the organisation.

==== Other activities in brief ====
- 10 activists from GayBelarus took part in KyivPride2012.
- 2 activists from GayBelarus took part in Baltic Pride 2012.
- 20 activists from GayBelarus, together with the members of other Belarusian organisations, took part in the Parade of Equality in Warsaw.
- GayBelarus held several other cultural, educational, and other events.
- From November 2012, GayBelarus started film screenings at their headquarters. The film screenings took place every week and the movies selected were related to LGBT issues. Everyone could attend the event, regardless of sexual orientation and gender identity.

=== 2013 ===
==== Continued issues with registration ====
On 5 February 2013, the Ministry of Justice made the decision to refuse the registration of Human Rights Center Lambda. It stated that the articles of the organisation did not have any provisions that the statutory activities of the public association would be aimed at ensuring social formation and the all-round development of young people. The Ministry of Justice reported that all the organisational faults were irremediable.

The founders of Lambda appealed against the decision of the Ministry of Justice to the Supreme Court of the Republic of Belarus. During the hearing, the applicant's claim was adjudicated. The founders of Lambda also filed a complaint against the UN Committee on Human Rights.

Because of this attempt to register the organisation, in January and February 2013, more than 60 founders of Lambda from 10 cities across the country were called in for a conversation by the representatives of the Office on Drugs and Trafficking Control of the Ministry of Internal Affairs of the Republic of Belarus. The police officers asked questions related to the founders’ private lives, including their sexual activities and orientation, the organisation's activities and the personality of its leader. To prevent non-attendance, police officers paid visits to the workplaces of the members or contacted the universities’ authorities with a request to conduct a preventive conversation with the student.

==== Police intimidation ====
The leaders of the organisation were also under pressure. The head of the organisation had his passport taken away twice. The activists were also removed from trains and searched. One of the activists was severely beaten at the police precinct. This led to a formal complaint filed to the prosecutor's office.

Amnesty International called on the Belarusian Government to respect the right for freedom of LGBT associations and to give them the opportunity to register the Human Rights Center Lambda. Amnesty International published a report on the human rights in Belarus, in particular the rights for freedom of peaceful assembly and freedom of association. This included detail of the authorities' persecution of LGBT representatives, their organisations and activists. The cases of persecution and intimidation were also stated by Ian Kelly, the chairman of the U.S. Mission to the OSCE, in his report "Statement of harassment in regards to the LGBT people and political prisoners in Belarus" to the Permanent Council in Vienna on 14 February 2013.

Between January and April 2013, there were 7 police raids on the activities of GayBelarus.

- The first incident occurred on the night from 11 to 12 January in the Minsk club ‘6_A’. The police entered the club, blocked the exit and recorded the personal information of all the customers. According to the witnesses, there were about 100 people at the club at the time of the raid. Consequently, the owner of the club ‘6_A’ started having problems with the city authorities, which made him close down the club.
- On the evening of the 12 to 13 January, a similar case occurred in the Vitebsk club ‘XXI Century’. At around 1am the police broke into the club and ordered everyone to stand against the walls: the males on one side, the females on the other. The police officers recorded the personal information (names, addresses, employment) of the customers. All the customers were also filmed on camera.

Some of the detainees during the police raids in Vitebsk filed complaints with the city executive committees on the illegal actions of the police. Similar raids took place throughout the following 4 months.

==== Vitaly Gulyak ====
In 2013, GayBelarus promoted the protection of the LGBT representative Vitaly Gulyak whose case had already been filed to the prosecutor's office. Gulyak was persecuted by an organised group of "hunters of pedophiles" called Leather Microphone. Two of the hunters were sentenced for insulting and distributing the victim's personal information and two more were announced wanted by the Criminal Investigation Department.

==== Other activities ====
- At the start of 2013, the "GayBelarus" activists delivered a lecture on the Belarusian LGBT movement to the students-politologists of the Dutch University of Radboud. The lecturers discussed their activities, shared their experience in regards to the organization of some events, and talked about the problems homosexuals encounter in Belarus.
- In April, GayBelarus filed an application to hold a picket at the Embassy of France in favour of the legalisation of gay marriage, but the Minsk City Executive Committee did not allow the LGBT representatives to conduct a peaceful action.
- GayBelarus together with the other LGBT initiatives in Belarus collectively condemned the statements by the Ambassador of France to Belarus Michel Raineri in which he stated that "as a functionary he is for the same-sex marriage, but as a true believer he speaks in favour of the union of a man and a woman". A joint letter was sent to a number of the government agencies of the French Republic with the request to admit the inadmissibility of such statements as they discriminate against LGBT people. As a result, the ambassador Michel Raineri initiated a meeting held in the Embassy of France. It was attended by the representative of GayBelarus, Natalia Mankovskaya, and Alexander Poluian from Gay Alliance of Belarus.
- The delegation of GayBelarus took part in the KyivPride2013.
- At the end of July 2013, a Minsk-Brest cycling race was held. The event was arranged in support of Minsk Gay Pride 2012. All along the route, the participants were distributing flyers about Minsk Gay Pride, thereby informing about the upcoming event.

== Present ==
Many members of the association have been forced to flee the country because of persecution of gays from the state.

== Membership ==
- A member of the International association of gay-pride organisers InterPride
- A member of the European association of gay-pride organisers EuroPride
- A representative and an organiser of Slavic gay-pride in Belarus and a co-organiser of Slavic Pride in Moscow. Organizer of the Slavic Pride in Moscow is the advocate group LGBT Human Rights Project Gayrussia.ru.
- An official coordinator of International day against homophobia in Belarus and a member of International Day Against Homophobia and Transphobia Committee
- A co-organiser of a Month against homophobia in April/May 2008 in Belarus, which was not given authorisation. Space for the event was provided, but only on condition that the names of organisations providing space remain in uncertainty. Democratic parties and politicians did not support this event.

== See also ==
- Minsk Pride
- LGBT rights in Belarus
- Human rights in Belarus
- LGBT Human Rights Project Gayrussia.ru
