= Minsk Pride =

Annual LGBT event in Minsk, Belarus

Minsk Gay Pride
- Location: Minsk, Belarus
- Founded: 1999
- Language: Russian, Belarusian, English
- Website: http://www.pride.gaybelarus.by

Minsk Pride (Belarusian: Беларусь Гей Прайд, romanized: Belarus Gey Prayd) is a gay pride parade in Minsk, Belarus. This is a festival in support of tolerance for gays, lesbians, bisexuals and transgender people in Belarus.

== Belarus Gay Pride 1999 ==
The first Belarusian Pride Festival "Belarus Gay Pride" was held in Minsk from 6 to 9 September 1999. "Belarus Gay Pride" 1999 was organized by the Belarusian League for Sexual Equality "Lambda" and the magazine for gays and lesbians "Forum Lambda". The festival programme included a seminar for journalists on "Lesbians and gay men in the media", conference on the rights of gays and lesbians in Belarus and in the world, the exhibition of photographs and films taken homosexuals, competition "Mr. Gay Belarus" and competition "Transmission". During one of parties in the club burst the raided by riot police and frisked the contestants "Transmission". In the events of "Belarus Gay Pride" was attended by about 500 people.

== Belarus Gay Pride 2000 ==
In the period from 7 to 10 September 2000 in Minsk was held second Pride festival "Belarus Gay Pride" 2000. "Belarus Gay Pride" 2000 supported by prominent figures Belarusian culture, almost all of the artists stated in the programme, have agreed free to participate in the events in support of the rights of gays and lesbians.

The planned march "Belarus Gay Pride" 2000, was banned by the authorities 24 hours before its scheduled start. The rationale for denial of the march was that the organizers failed to obtain a permit to march on time. Most of the activities were banned under the pressure of the Russian Orthodox Church. Thus, not been displayed a collection of clothes, were abolished appearances Minsk and international artists, not take place contest "Miss DIVA-2000" and the first championship of Belarus on a male strip show.

Furthermore, the authorities did everything possible to prevent the planned activities planned. On 7 September in the "Aquarium" club, hosting the opening of "Belarus Gay Pride" 2000, was raided by police. After 15 minutes of an art performance the lights went out, and the police ordered participants to leave the premises. The police then pursued participants in the streets of the city.

The next day, the authorities closed "Belarus Gay Pride" 2000 press centre, ordering an evacuation and cessation of operations, as well as the cancellation of all activities being held at the House of Culture, such as workshops and film screenings. According to the director of the House of Culture, it was closed to all visitors for alleged technical reasons. Screening of films on LGBT themes in the city's cinemas were also cancelled. The organizing committee and all the people who were in the building, left the building under the supervision of police officers in plain clothes, of leading videotaping of the car. Communication was disabled, and the organizing committee was deprived of contact with human rights organizations and the media.

Only in the evening did the organizing committee receive final information about what the club "Reactor" where all night events were cancelled and electricity was cut off in the surrounding area.

In the following days all the planned festival workshops took place in the open air. After one of the seminars, it was decided to lay flowers at the Eternal Flame in Victory Square in memory of the gays and lesbians who were killed by the Nazis during the Second World War. Flowers and a giant rainbow flag were placed in memory of the victims and a moment of silence was observed.

Despite persecution, a press conference was successfully held in front of the City Opera House, which was attended by independent media where Belarusian and Swedish activists condemned the actions of the authorities. In the afternoon a seminar was held in the city park.

September 9 finished the second Belarusian Pride Festival "Belarus Gay Pride" 2000. Closing ceremony took place despite the opposition of the city authorities and officials from the presidential administration in a Minsk clubs, after it clubs "Aquarium" and "Reactor" refused to grant their premises for organizing committee.

Was dealt a huge blow to civil liberties in the state, as the authorities have made it clear that from now on any attempt to gays and lesbians to publicly declare their rights will be fraught with brutal repression.

== Belarus Gay Pride 2001 ==
From 2 to 9 September 2001 in Minsk hosted the third Pride Festival in support of tolerance towards LGBT "Belarus Gay Pride" 2001.

During the Pride festival in Minsk cinema "Victory" was screened movies of the famous French director François Ozon, organized by Minsk "Cinema club". Were shown 4 film by François Ozon's such as "Sitcom", "Criminal Lovers", "Under the Sand", "Drops of rain on hot stones".

The movie screenings had great success. Before showing the latest film, leader of the Belarusian League for Sexual Equality "Lambda" Edward Tarletski, spoke a word of thanks to all who helped organize and conduct these screenings.

September 5 held a public action in memory of gay victims of the Nazis on the site of the former concentration camp "Trostenets" near Minsk. The first speech was by Edward Tarletski. Не said that in Belarus we have a special attitude to the problem of Nazism, because even by the estimates of Soviet historians, which are usually lowered, about 25% of Belarusians were murdered by fascists during the Second World War. Also underlined that the nazi persecution of homosexuals mostly was silenced in Belarus from Soviet times till now, also said that we need to do a lot of work to reveal the names of this heroes and obstacles of their death and hope that holding the actions like this will initiate Belarusian LGBT movement activists to work more hard for it.

September 7 in Minsk was held "Love-parade" public action a third Pride Festival "Belarus Gay Pride" 2001. The "Love Parade" was held along the sidewalk along the route from Belarus State Circus along the Avenue Skarina (now Independence Avenue) to Panikovski park on October Square in Minsk city on the day before presidential elections in Belarus in 2001.

Also this day was held a carnival-show travesty-artists under the slogan "We choose love".

September 9 in Minsk club "Vavilon" held the official closing ceremony of the festival. Addressing the audience, the international secretary of the Belarusian League for Sexual Equality "Lambda" Sergei Torpachev said that "Pride" is translated as pride, and Belarusian lesbians and gay men can truly be proud of conduct of the festival.

During the last concert at the club, with the participation of contestants "Miss DIVA-2001" and a special guest, a famous rock singer Valik Grishko, volunteers, management of the club "Vavilon" and members of the committee were presented with letters of appreciation "for their help in organizing and participation in the festival. "Letters of appreciation were also presented to the representatives of the youth association "Different-Equal", the Belarusian Federation of Anarchists, and organizations, which officially supported and participated in the first "Love-Parade".

But there have been incidents. Three people, which distributing promotional information about "Love-Parade", was taken to the police station, but were released after a while and gave them printed materials. In addition, the number of foreign visitors from Germany and Sweden, who were to participate in the festival held in the workshops was denied a visa for unspecified reasons, but unofficially them told that this is due to the upcoming presidential election.

== Belarus Gay Pride 2002 ==
In 2002, a few days before "Belarus Gay Pride" 2002, the leader of the Belarusian League for Sexual Equality "Lambda" Edward Tarletsky was summoned to the police station in Minsk. At the police station he was told that if the gay pride parade takes place, the police will not take any responsibility for the consequences. The police also threatened to Edward Tarletsky criminal prosecution, if a street pride parade to take place.

Festival of gays and lesbians "Belarus Gay Pride" 2002 was held in Minsk in September and was organized by the Belarusian League for Sexual Equality "Lambda", the magazine for gays and lesbians "Forum Lambda" and the Belarusian gay site "ApaGay". It was the fourth festival in the history of the LGBT movement in Belarus.

The aim of the festival was to draw public attention to the existence of gays and lesbians. However, unlike in previous festivals, the program "Belarus Gay Pride" 2002 was not a march through the streets of Minsk.

During the festival hosted a conference "Homosexuality in Belarus", Fashion Show Night, lecture "French literature and homosexuality", lesbian party, final transvestite contest "Miss DIVA-2002", evening of poetry and a concert "Musicians against homophobia".

== Minsk Gay Pride 2008 ==
October 11, 2008 in Minsk hosted the LGBT Pride, the motto of which was the slogan, "Be able to be! Be able to love! Be able to proud." The march was timed to the International Day of Coming out.

The parade was organized by the Belarusian Initiative for Sexual and Gender Equality. In the parade was attended by representatives of the initiative, also the public action supported movements "Antifa" and "Socialist Resistance". The action was initiated LGBT activists Siarhei Androsenka and Yuri Kozachenko.

The participants the pride parade marched from Yakub Kolas to October Square, the procession ended at the park near the building of the Presidential Administration of the Republic of Belarus. In Pride parade was attended by about 30 people.

== Slavic Pride 2010 ==
The joint efforts of Russian and Belarusian LGBT activists the second Slavic Gay Pride was held in Minsk from 14 to 17 May 2010.

Afternoon May 14, 2010 in the premises of the "Belarusian Helsinki Committee" was held a human rights seminar, after which the co-organizers of Pride Sergey Androsenko and Nikolai Alekseev spoke at a press conference dedicated to the event. The evening of 14 May at the Minsk Hotel "Crowne Plaza" the grand opening of the "Slavic Gay Pride 2010", which culminated premiere in Eastern European the Canadian documentary film directed by Bob Christie about global movement of gay pride "Beyond Gay: The Politics of Pride".

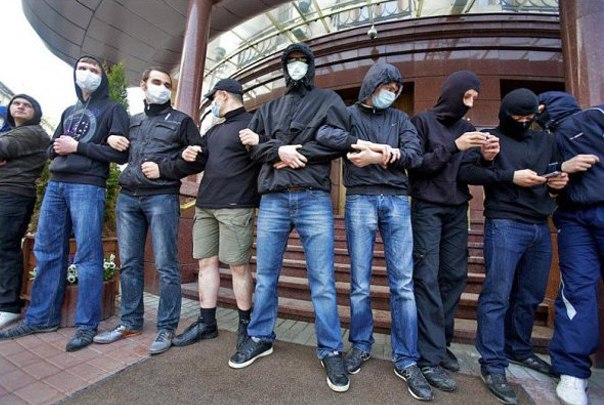
Protesters in conducting a "Slavic Gay Pride 2010"

By the beginning of movie screening to the hotel were pulled together dozens the protesters from among nationalists, extremists and football fans. The organizers were forced to postpone the beginning of the movie screening for an hour. At this time, the security service and the law enforcement agencies pushed the protesters from the entrance. 20 minutes after the start of the premiere in hotel anonymous caller said a bomb threat. The police and security service hotel asked the organizers to interrupt the show and go to another conference room, which was done. After that, hundreds of participants managed to watch the movie to the end. After the screening of the film at the "Crowne Plaza" hosted dinner for the participants, after which they left the hotel without hindrance. May 15 was held a march "Slavic Gay Pride 2010", which was attended by about 40 activists from Russia and Belarus. Participants of the action passed about 400 meters down the street Surganova in the center of the Belarusian capital. In their hands was a large 12-meter rainbow flag of the international gay movement.

After 300 meters the march participants stopped, unfurled a rainbow flags and banners, and then began to chant slogans "Homophobia - a disease", "Gay equality without compromise", "Belarus without homophobia". Activists held placards "Today prohibit gays banned tomorrow you!" and "My gender is - it's my choice." The action was covered by about 30 journalists, including more than 10 cameras. After a brief rally, which was peaceful, the participants of the march passed about 150 meters whereupon the Minsk Special Forces soldiers attacked the demonstrators route march was closed, the participants of the march dispersed and beaten wrested from them a rainbow flag. As a result of special forces operations, several people, including a member of the organizing committee of the St. Petersburg Gay Pride - Yuri Gavrikov were arrested and taken to the police station.

Later in the restaurant "Lido" on Yakub Kolas police officers in civilian detained Belarusian co-organizer of the "Slavic Gay Pride 2010" Siarhei Androsenka and three local LGBT activists. They were taken to the Soviet police department.

On the night of 15–16 May, immediately after the demonstration in the centre of Minsk, a party was held in a Minsk club dedicated to the "Slavic Gay Pride 2010", during which the names of the people marked by the human rights award of the second "Slavic Gay Pride 2010" were announced. They were the director of Minsk's "Club 6_A", Alexander Sakovich, and the President of the Committee of the International Day Against Homophobia and Transphobia IDAHO, Louis-Georges Tin.

== Minsk Gay Pride 2011 ==
"Minsk Gay Pride" 2011 was held in Minsk from 11 to 23 October 2011. More than 20 events the human rights, educational, informational, cultural and entertaining programs were held in this period.

Events "Minsk Gay Pride" 2011 received the support of the Belarusian human rights activists, some political leaders, institutions art and show business. Free Theatre in the framework of the "Minsk Gay Pride" has shown a play about sexuality in two parts of the "New York'79 - Minsk 2011", a popular youth performers' "Broken heart boy", Alex Leep, "Color of Aloe" and others spoke against violence over LGBT youth in concert at the closing day of pride.

October 11 was held opening ceremony of "Minsk Gay Pride" 2011 dedicated to the International Coming Out Day. At the event was, a host of representatives of civil society, journalists, diplomats, representatives of the LGBT community, their friends and relatives. At the opening ceremony, the premiere of the documentary "The Jury", directed by Vladimir Ivanov.

October 21 on a press conference, chairman of the organizing committee of "Minsk Gay Pride" 2011 Siarhei Androsenka announced intention to hold a march in defiance of a ban of the city authorities. According to him, the procession will not be massive, as organizers predict a forceful dispersal action. Place of demonstrations was not disclosed for the safety of its participants.

October 22 in Minsk city district Shabany, activists of LGBT movement in Belarus held a march against homophobia, about 16.40 local time about 20 activists of the LGBT movement gathered in the courtyard near the street Selitskogo. They went out to the highway and have passed about 40 meters waving rainbow flags and chanting "Belarus without homophobia!" and "Pride - normally!". Upon completion of the action activists have launched into the sky 20-meter rainbow flag, a symbol of the movement for LGBT rights, on the balloons.

The 2011 'Minsk Gay Pride' events drew significant attention to the legal and social challenges facing the LGBT community in Belarus, specifically regarding discrimination and homophobia. The event served as a catalyst for increased public and governmental discourse concerning human rights and social equality in the country.

== Minsk Gay Pride 2012 ==
The events of "Minsk Gay Pride" 2012 under the slogan "The right to be yourself!" was held in Minsk from 5 to 11 October 2012. The program of "Minsk Gay Pride" 2012 was intense, for all time within the forum was held 15 events. In the framework of the "Minsk Gay Pride" in 2012 held bright entertaining parties, who urged the LGBT community and their friends together celebrate diversity and to enjoy life here in Belarus, despite the lack of same-sex marriages and the legal field in which representatives of the LGBT community could live openly and with dignity.

In an atmosphere the triumph of tolerance and mutual support October 5, 2012 successfully held the ceremonial opening of the eighth LGBT Human Rights Forum "Minsk Gay Pride" 2012. The opening ceremony was attended by at least 100 people, among them such distinguished guests as Counsellor and Deputy Head of Mission of the Embassy of the Netherlands in Warsaw - Adrian Palm, who spoke with words of support for the Pride Week and the entire LGBT community in Belarus and well-known Belarusian human rights activist, leader Center for Legal Transformation - Elena Tonkacheva.

The opening of the Pride Week was also a day of presentation of the project "10 persons Minsk Gay Pride", which reflects the motivation, the views of people involved in, or solidarity with efforts to protect the rights of LGBT people.

The sixth Belarusian LGBT Conference. International Interdisciplinary Scientific Conference "Queer Sexuality: Policy and Practice" has collected experts from Belarus, Russia, Kyrgyzstan, Ukraine, Sweden, Poland, Latvia and other European countries. The conference was designed to create a space for analysis and understanding of the policies and practices of the construction of sexuality. Conference was organized by the efforts of the LGBT Human Rights Project "GayBelarus" and the feminist project "Gender route".

The third day of "Minsk Gay Pride" 2012 was dedicated to education. From morning until evening representatives of the LGBT community and just active youth were trained to various aspects of protection of the rights and lives of LGBT: advocacy, human rights, have learned more about the trans and Queer people.

October 11 in Minsk was held a public action of "Minsk Gay Pride" 2012. Human rights activists from the LGBT Human Rights Project "GayBelarus" rented a special tram, which was decorated with multi-colored balloons and rainbow flags in support of tolerance to the LGBT community. The tram went to 15.40 from the endpoint to the "Green Meadow" to the other terminus - "Myasnikov Square ". Thus tram passed through almost the entire capital.

== Minsk Pride 2022 ==
August 2022 31 on the Internet was published video informing on holding Minsk Pride 2022.

October 21, LGBT Human Rights Project "GayBelarus" began a campaign to collect signatures in support of public action "Minsk Pride 2013". Organizers of petition, calls on the authorities to give permission for a public action "Minsk Gay Pride 2013" in support of tolerance to the LGBT community in Belarus and to provide an opportunity the LGBT community to exercise their constitutional right to freedom of peaceful assembly and to freedom of expression without discrimination.

== See also ==
- LGBT rights in Belarus
- Recognition of same-sex unions in Europe
- Gaybelarus.by
