= Sergey Androsenko =

Belarusian LGBTQ activist (born 1988)

- Сяргей Андросенка; Сергей Андросенко
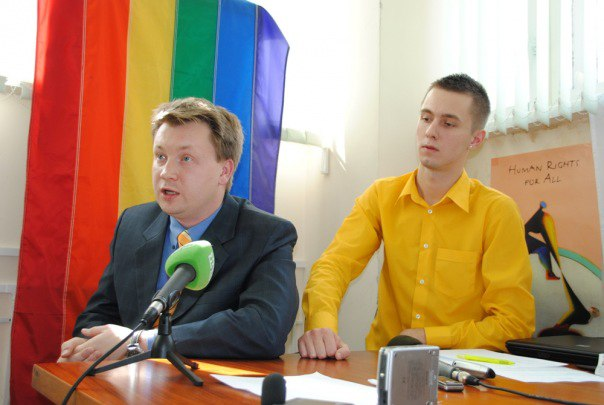
- Androsenko (right) in May 2010 with Russian activist Nikolay Alexeyev
- Born: 30 August 1988 (age 37); Minsk, Byelorussian SSR, Soviet Union
- Other political affiliations: BPF Party (early 2000s–2006) (Note: He was a member of the party's youth wing BPF Youth)

Sergey Androsenko (Note: Russian: Сергей Андросенко; Belarusian: Сяргей Андросенка, romanized: Syarhey Androsyenka) (born 30 August 1988) is a Belarusian LGBTQ rights activist and chair of the LGBTQ rights organization GayBelarus.

== Early life and political activism ==
Androsenko was born in August 1988 in Minsk into a working-class family. He graduated from an evening school in Zavodski District and worked in various private companies, taking jobs as a bartender and as an administrator of a gay club in Minsk.

In the early-to-mid 2000s, Androsenko was a member of the BPF Youth, the youth wing of the BPF Party. He eventually left, alleging intraparty homophobia, and decided to pursue LGBTQ activism. In April 2008, Androsenko marched on the occasion of the Day of Remembrance of the Chernobyl tragedy carrying a pride flag, though his applications to march in later remembrance days with his organization were turned down by authorities.

== LGBTQ activism ==
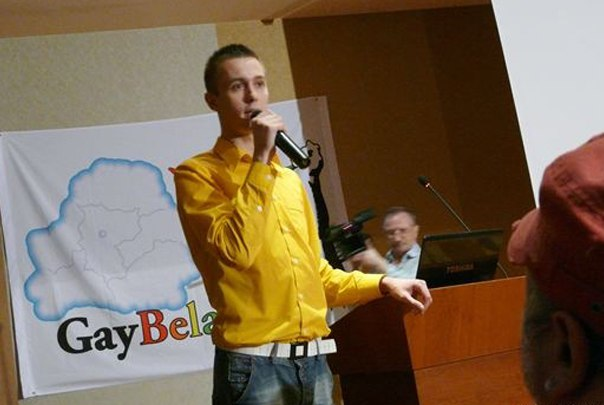
Androsenko speaking during a GayBelarus event in May 2010, promoting the 2010 Slavic Gay Pride

Androsenko became the chairman of GayBelarus in 2009, organizing three Minsk Pride parades between 2010 and 2012. During the 2012 Belarusian parliamentary election, he campaigned for the recognition of same-sex unions in Belarus, taking part in social activism to campaign for the right to civil unions.

In January 2009, Androsenko and other representatives of the Belarusian Initiative for Sexual and Gender Equality protested the conscription call for a gay man who worked as a journalist and activist. Androsenko stated to media that it was not safe for a gay person to be called for military duties in Belarus, citing the army as highly homophobic and expressing concerns, along with other activists, about the psychological and physical health of this man. The army subsequently declared the young man unfit for service.

In May 2009, Androsenko was detained by police in Moscow, Russia, while taking part in a protest against homophobia in Russia. Along with Androsenko, riot police also arrested British activist Peter Tatchell. On 16 December 2009, Androsenko was arrested outside the Iranian embassy in Minsk after he and other gay activists organized a demonstration in front of the embassy to protest Iran's treatment of gay men. One week later, on 23 December, a court in Minsk convicted him and the other activists of unauthorized assembly and fined them; in the case of Androsenko, it imposed a fine of 350,000 Belarusian rubles.

Androsenko and Russian LGBTQ rights activist Nikolay Alexeyev united in November 2018 to form the Slavic Gay Pride, in which Belarusian LGBTQ people would travel to Moscow in June 2019 for that year's Moscow Pride, which had already been banned by the end of 2018. He has also been a strong critic of President Alexander Lukashenko, whom Androsenko accused of "state-sanctioned homophobia" following the physical assaults and arrests at the 2010 Minsk Pride.

== Aggressions and exile ==
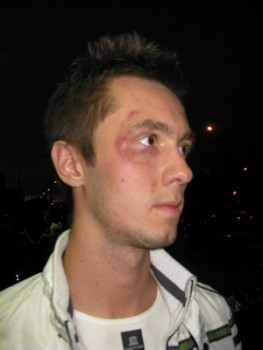
Androsenko claimed he was beaten by police in June 2011.

Between 2010 and 2013, Androsenko was arrested multiple times. In 2010, the government banned the Minsk Pride, with the courts rejecting appeals presented by Androsenko and other organizations and activists. When they marched defying the ban on 15 May 2010, police attacked them and arrested multiple participants, including Androsenko. He was arrested again along with other gay men in June 2011 in Minsk following an altercation with riot police. He was released late at night from a police station in Lyeninski District. Visibly bruised, Androsenko claimed that he was beaten by special forces in the detention bus, adding that when he told police officers at the station about the beating, they beat him too until he agreed to say that he had no complaints against police.

Before leaving Belarus in June 2013, Androsenko had been detained by border guards of the State Border Committee of the Republic of Belarus after a trip to Vilnius, Lithuania. The officers searched his belongings, conducted a search of his person and confiscated his passport. Androsenko subsequently left Belarus alleging police harassment due to being gay. He first lived in Moldova and later in other countries like Serbia, Poland, and Lithuania, before moving to Sweden in 2014, where he requested political asylum. The petition was rejected in July 2015 by the Aliens Appeals Board of Sweden. While he lived in Stockholm, Androsenko served as a board member and secretary of a local LGBTQ organization. He was also interviewed for German media and has been described as a leader of the Belarusian LGBTQ community.

== UN Human Rights Committee suit ==
After his arrest in December 2009 over his protest in front of the Iranian embassy in Minsk, Androsenko filed a lawsuit against Belarus at the UN Human Rights Committee for the treatment that he and other gay men received at the hands of police and the rulings by the Minsk City Court and the Supreme Court to dismiss his appeals on 19 January 2010 and 7 January 2010, respectively. On 30 March 2016, the UNHRC found in Androsenko's favor.
