= LGBTQ culture in Russia =

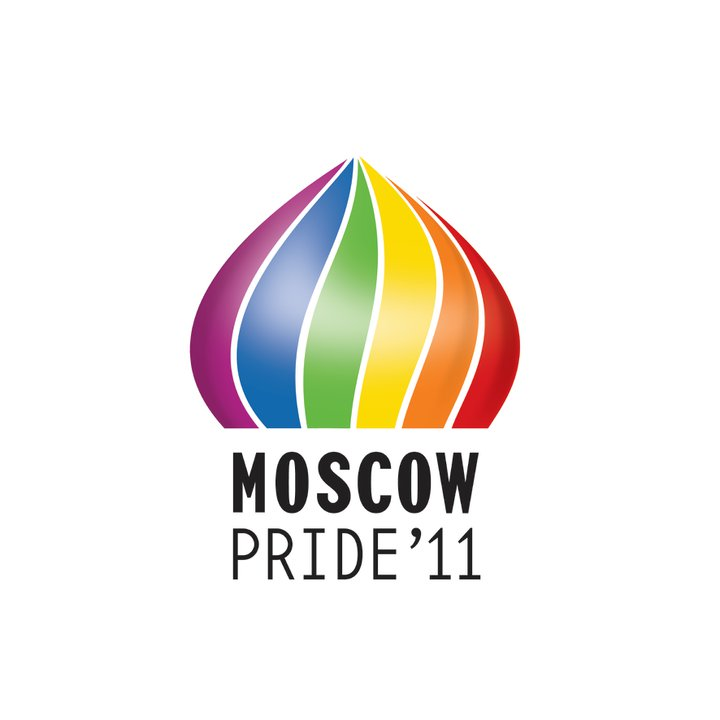
Moscow International LGBT Pride Festival was first celebrated in 2006 and was the subject of the documentary Moscow Gay Pride '06.

Although life in modern Russia allows many more liberties for gay men and lesbians than it did before the fall of communism, unofficial discrimination and fear are still rampant. "It would be foolish to interpret some new freedoms as tolerance," said Igor Kon, a sociologist who is Russia's best-known expert on sexual practices, and author of The Sexual Revolution in Russia. Gay life in Russia is less open than in Western countries. With more quickly growing acceptance, major cities like Moscow and St Petersburg now have LGBTQ clubs and venues.

In 1989, before the collapse of the USSR, 31 percent of the Russian population said in polls that homosexuals should be executed, and 32 percent said they should be isolated. Only 12 percent said they should be left alone. The figures are shifting slightly, however: in 1994, 23 percent in a poll said homosexuals should be killed, 24 percent said they should be isolated, and 29 percent said they should be left alone.

"What everyone here knows -- gay or straight -- is how to have a private life that is different from their public life," said David Tuller, an American journalist and author of Cracks in the Iron Closet: Travels in Gay and Lesbian Russia. "In the West we would call that living a lie," he said. "Here they don't think that way. This is not a talk-show culture. Nobody is ever going to appear on television to talk about wanting to sleep with short men or tall women. They just want to be able to have their lives and not be bothered. For people here that would be a big step."

== History ==
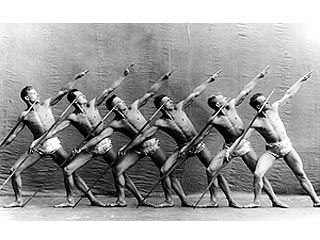
Gay show in Saint Petersburg, 1900s photo by Karl Bulla.

Medieval Russia was apparently very tolerant of homosexuality, with foreign visitors to the country surprised by displays of affection between homosexuals. The first laws against homosexuals in Russia came about in the 18th century, under the reign of Peter the Great, but only in military statutes for soldiers.

In 1832, the criminal code included Article 995, which stated that "muzhelozhstvo", or men lying with men, was a criminal act punishable by exile to Siberia for up to 5 years. Men lying with men was interpreted by courts as meaning anal sex. Application of the laws was rare, and the turn of the century found a relaxation of these laws and a general growing of tolerance and visibility.

In the wake of the October Revolution, the Bolshevik regime decriminalized homosexuality. The Bolsheviks rewrote the constitution and "produced two Criminal Codes – in 1922 and 1926 – and an article prohibiting homosexual sex was left off both." The new Communist Party government removed the old laws regarding sexual relations, effectively legalising homosexual and transgender activity within Russia, although it remained illegal in other territories of the Soviet Union, and the homosexuals in Russia were still persecuted and sacked from their jobs. Under Joseph Stalin, the Soviet Union recriminalized homosexuality in a decree signed in 1933. The new Article 121, which punished "muzhelozhstvo" with imprisonment for up to 5 years, saw raids and arrests. Female homosexuals were sent to mental institutions. The decree was part of a broader campaign against "deviant" behavior and "Western degeneracy". Discrimination against LGBT individuals persisted in the Soviet era, and homosexuality was not officially declassified as a mental illness until 1999.

Soviet Article 121 was often commonly used to extend prison sentences and to control dissidents. Among those imprisoned were the well-known film director Sergei Paradjanov and the poet Gennady Trifonov. Under Mikhail Gorbachev's administration in the late 1980s, the first gay organization came into being. The Moscow Gay & Lesbian Alliance was headed by Yevgeniya Debryanskaya and Roman Kalinin, who became the editor of the first officially registered gay newspaper, Tema. The fall of the USSR accelerated the progress of the gay movement in Russia. Gay publications and plays appeared. In 1993, a new Russian Criminal Code was signed, without Article 121. Men who had been imprisoned began to be released.

Modern gay life in Russia is in the process of increasing openness. The first gay-oriented businesses appeared, including bars, discos, saunas, even a travel agency. Life for gays and lesbians in the provinces remains difficult, but there are gay communities and open gay culture in large cities such as Moscow and St Petersburg. At a press conference on 1 February 2007, Russian President Vladimir Putin was asked for his opinion in the midst of a row over the decision by Moscow Mayor Yury Luzhkov to ban a Gay pride parade in Moscow, called Moscow Pride. Vladimir Putin said: "With regards to what the heads of regions say, I normally try not to comment. I don’t think it is my business. My relation to gay parades and sexual minorities in general is simple – it is connected with my official duties and the fact that one of the country’s main problems is demographic. But I respect and will continue to respect personal freedom in all its forms, in all its manifestations."

In 2013, Putin signed the so-called "Gay propaganda law", after it had been passed in the State Duma by an overwhelming majority. The law prohibits disseminating "propaganda" about homosexuality to minors. A number of activists have been fined under the law for advocating the acceptance of homosexuality.

== Documentaries ==
Several documentaries about gay life in Russia surfaced in the 1990s after the fall of the USSR including Kiev Blue, To My Women Friends, and Moscow Fags.

Moscow Pride '06, is a documentary about the first Moscow International LGBT Pride Festival. The premiere was held on November 27, just six months after the festival. Some focuses of the documentary include the Nordic festival, the Russian gay cultural contest, Merlin Holland’s lecture on his grandfather Oscar Wilde and the International Day Against Homophobia (IDAHO) Conference . Moscow Pride '06 also focuses on the trouble around The Kremlin and Moscow City Hall when participants gathered to protest the ban on the Moscow Pride march – and the Tverskoy Court decision to uphold Mayor Yuri Luzhkov's decision to ban the march. Vlad Ortanov, former editor of Argo, one of the oldest gay magazines in Russia, described the documentary as “a great human historical document that will say a lot to the future generations”.

== Media ==
There are modern gay journals such as Kvir along with older ones such as now defunct Tema, the first registered gay magazine.

LGBT magazines and newspapers

- Kvir (M) Gay lifestyle magazine. 2003-2012
- BF BEST FOR (M) Gay lifestyle magazine. 2005-
- Ty (M) ed. Gennady Krimenskoi, 2 issues: 1992, 1993
- Argo (M) ed. Vlad Ortanov & Konstantin Evgen'ev 1994–present, 3 issues, 4th coming soon (1996)
- Tema (M) ed. Roman Kalinin (& Vitaly Lazarenko) 1990–93, 13 issues
- 1/10 (M) ed. Dmitry Lychev, 1991–present
  - (also No. 1 / 94: 1/10 International in English
  - and SOHO Revue 8 /94 Russian insert in Czech gay magazine)
- Kristofer (SPb) ed. G. Vetskoi & Sergei Shcherbakov, 1992
- Impul's (M) ed. Grigorii Vetskoi, Nikolai Sivolobov, 1992
- Risk (M) ed. Vlad Ortanov & Dima Kuzmin, 1990–1993, 5-6 issues

LGBT Journals of literature and culture

- Gay, Slaviane! (SPb) ed. Olga Zhuk, Sergei Shcherbakov, Gennady Trifonov, 2 issues: 1993, 1994
- Risk (M) ed. Dmitry Kuzmin (Egor Gorodetskii, Yaroslav Mogutin), 2 issues: 1995, 1996

== See also ==
- Moscow Pride, Gay pride in Moscow
- Moscow Pride '06 (film)
- LGBT rights in Russia
