= Moscow Pride =

Former annual LGBT event in Moscow, Russia

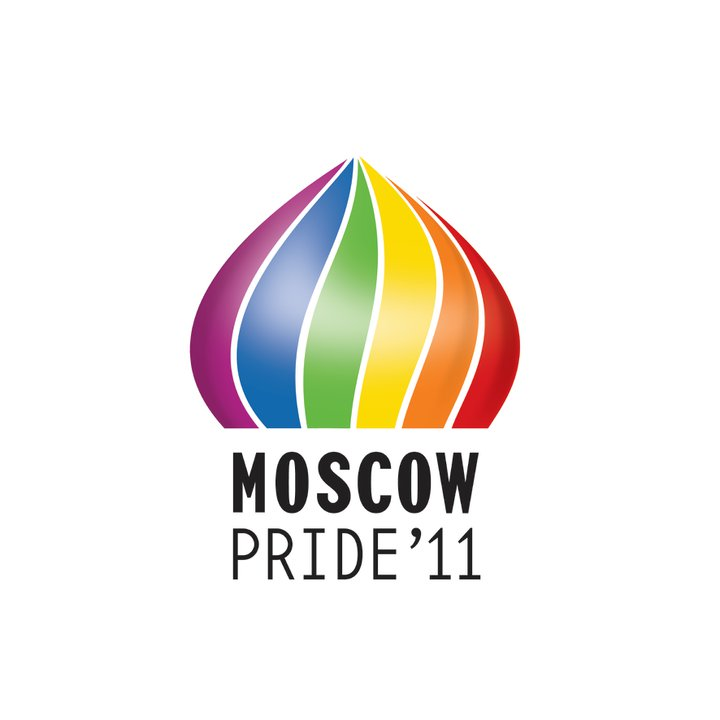
Moscow International Gay Pride Festival Logo

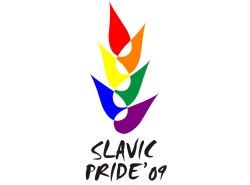
Slavic Pride Logo

Moscow Pride (Russian: Московский Гей-Прайд, romanized: Moskovskiy Gey-Prayd, lit. 'Moscow Gay Pride') was a demonstration of LGBTQ people in Russia. It was intended to take place in May annually since 2006 in the Russian capital Moscow, but has been regularly banned by the Government of Moscow, headed by Mayor Yury Luzhkov until 2010. The demonstrations in 2006, 2007, and 2008 were all accompanied by homophobic attacks, which was avoided in 2009 by moving the site of the demonstration at the last minute. The organizers of all of the demonstrations were Alexey Davydov, Nikolai Alekseev and Gayrussia.ru.

In June 2012, Moscow courts enacted a hundred-year ban on gay pride parades. The European Court of Human Rights has repeatedly ruled that such bans violate freedom of assembly guaranteed by the European Convention on Human Rights.

== Moscow Pride 2006 ==
The 2006 Moscow Pride was banned by the authorities. The Moscow Mayor's chief of security, Nikolai Kulikov, stated in an interview on Echo Moskvy, a radio station, that the Gay Pride conference and festival would be banned because of the negative views of the Russian population towards it: "all public expressions [by gays and lesbians] must be banned [...] They violate our rights. We have our traditions, lots of religious groups told us that they were against this gay pride." The chief mufti of Russia's Central Spiritual Governance for Muslims, Talgat Tadzhuddin, advocated violence towards any protesters: "The parade should not be allowed, and if they still come out into the streets, then they should be bashed. Sexual minorities have no rights, because they have crossed the line. Alternative sexuality is a crime against God". Russian Orthodox leaders echoed his views, declaring that homosexuality is a "sin which destroys human beings and condemns them to a spiritual death".

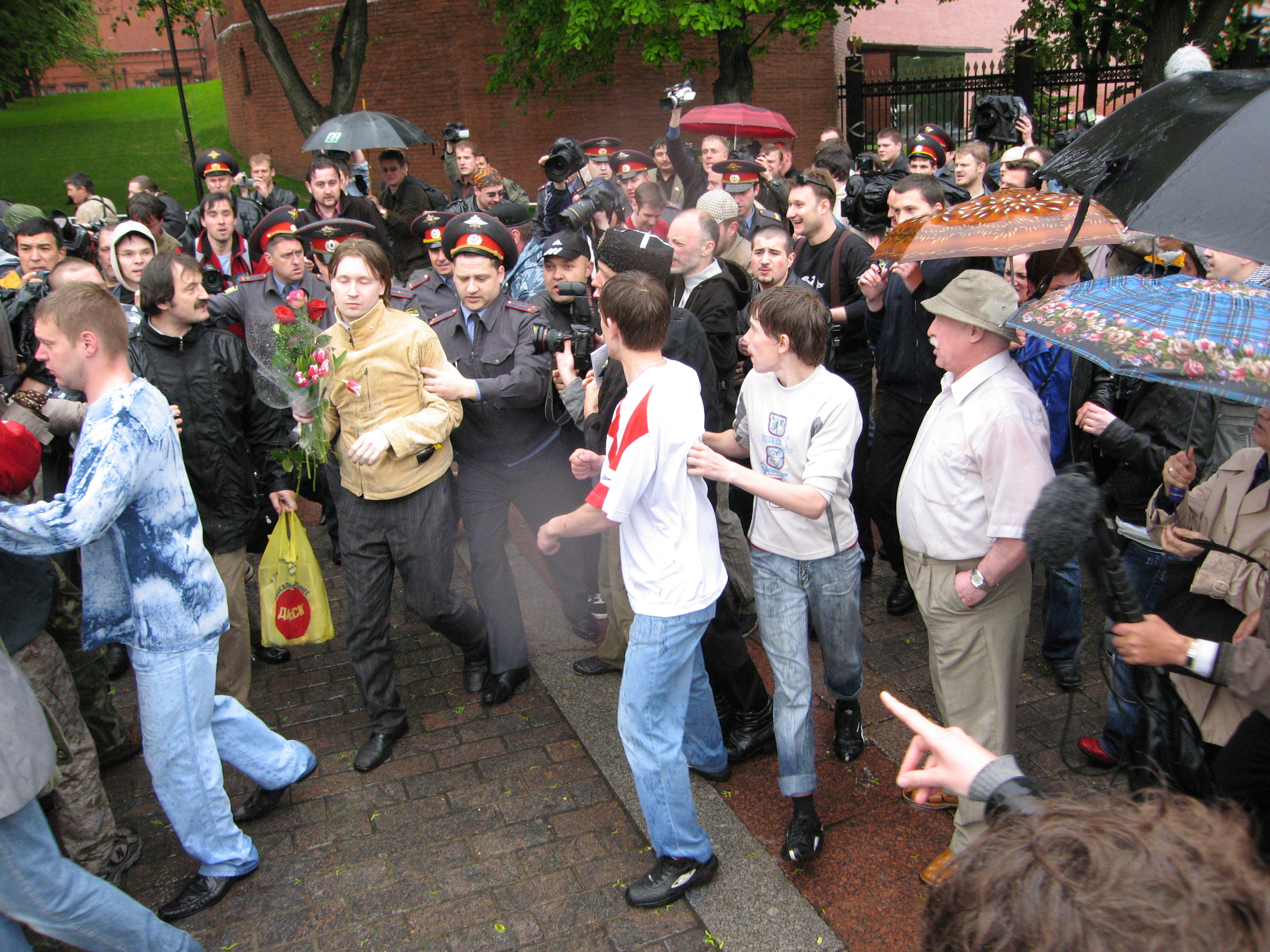
Nikolai Alekseev at the first Moscow Pride in 2006

On May 27, several dozen Russian lesbian, gay, bisexual, and transgender protestors, accompanied by Russian and foreign supporters, including members of the European and Volker Beck, member of the German parliaments, sought to hold two successive protest rallies after a court upheld Mayor Yuriy Luzkhov's ban on a march they planned for that day to commemorate the 13th anniversary of the decriminalization of homosexuality in Russia. The parade went ahead as planned but was attacked by counter-protesters and finally broken up by the police. There were two main confrontations, the first of which occurred when activists approached the Tomb of the Unknown Soldier near the Kremlin, in an attempt to lay wreaths. According to Human Rights Watch, at both events hundreds of antigay protesters, including skinheads and nationalists attacked the participants, beating and kicking many, while throwing projectiles and chanting homophobic slogans. Police intervened belatedly, failing to protect demonstrators, thus aggravating the violence. Volker Beck was attacked and injured, the attackers have never been arrested. According to campaigner Peter Tatchell, "We were immediately set upon by about 100 fascist thugs and religious fanatics who began pushing, punching and kicking us". Injured participants included German Member of Parliament Volker Beck and Merlin Holland, Oscar Wilde's grandson.

Russian LGBT Human Rights Project Gayrussia.ru sponsored a documentary film showing the events that took place around the first Moscow Pride festival. The documentary is called by his producer Nikolai Alekseev as vivid testimony of the fight for freedom of assembly in Russia. See Moscow Pride '06.

== Moscow Pride 2007 ==
The 2007 Moscow Pride was held on May 27. Its press conference and protest in front of the City Hall was attended by several high-profile supporters, including Marco Cappato, Vladimir Luxuria, Peter Tatchell, Volker Beck, Richard Fairbrass of Right Said Fred and the pop duo t.A.T.u. It degenerated into violent clashes with anti-gay extremists. For the second time police failed to protect gay rights activists. Italian MP Marco Cappato was kicked by an anti-gay activist and then detained when he demanded police protection. British gay rights veteran Peter Tatchell and Russian gay leader Nikolai Alekseev were detained as well. Tatchell and Beck were punched in the face by protesters. According to Tatchell: "The police were standing nearby and did nothing. Eventually they moved in. I was arrested while my attackers were allowed to go free." Between eight and ten protesters were arrested for participating in the rally.

Condemnation of the authorities' handling of the parade came from all over Europe. Mayor of Rome Walter Veltroni said: "What happened in Moscow, leaves you speechless: to use or even tolerate violence against those who are demonstrating in a peaceful manner for the recognition of their human and civil rights is a sad sign." Bertrand Delanoë, the Mayor of Paris, also condemned it.

The Pride was the central event in Jochen Hick's 2008 documentary film East/West - Sex & Politics, which follows the organisation of the Pride and the authorities' suppression of it.

== Moscow Pride 2008 ==
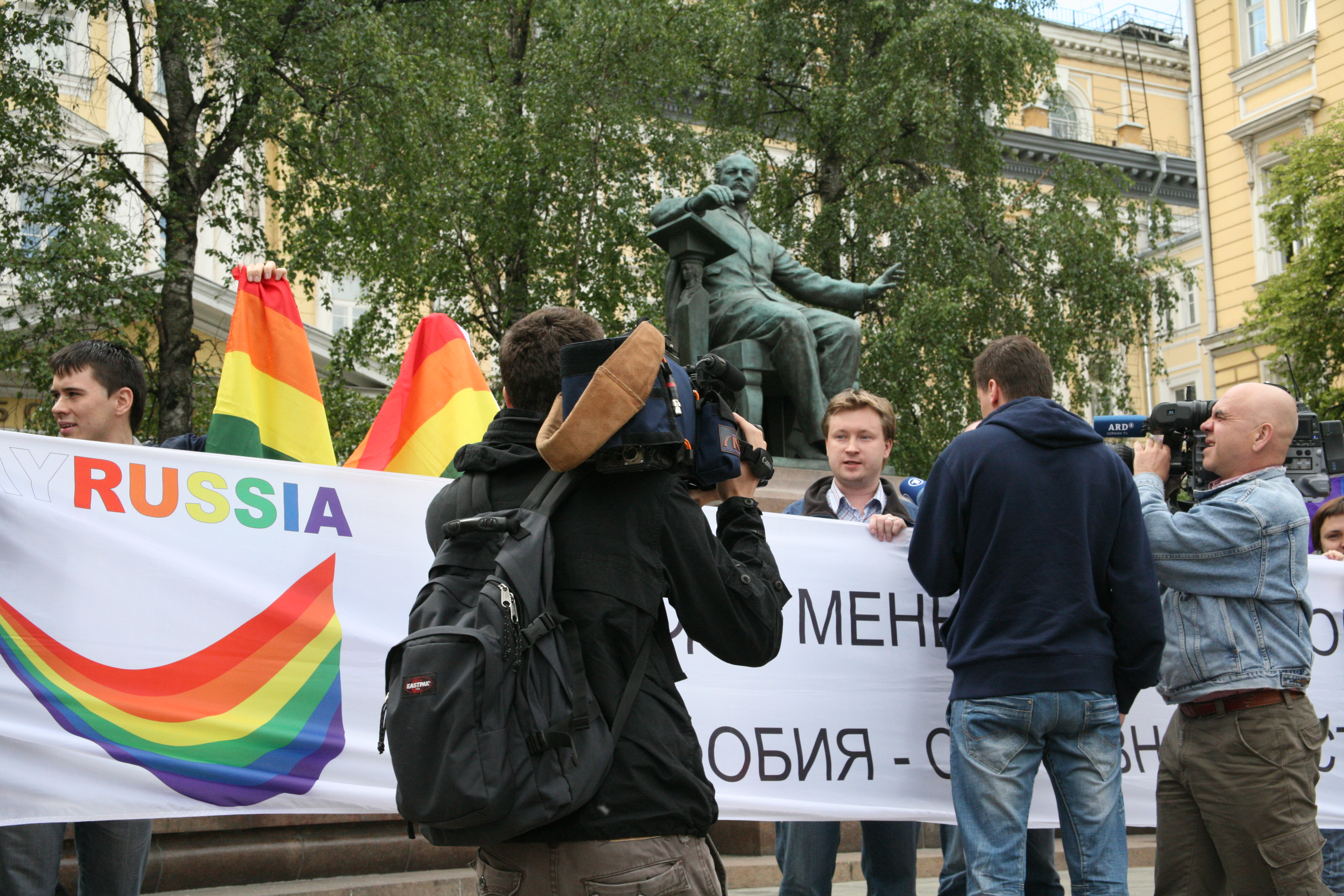
Photo of the Moscow Pride 2008 on June 1, 2008.

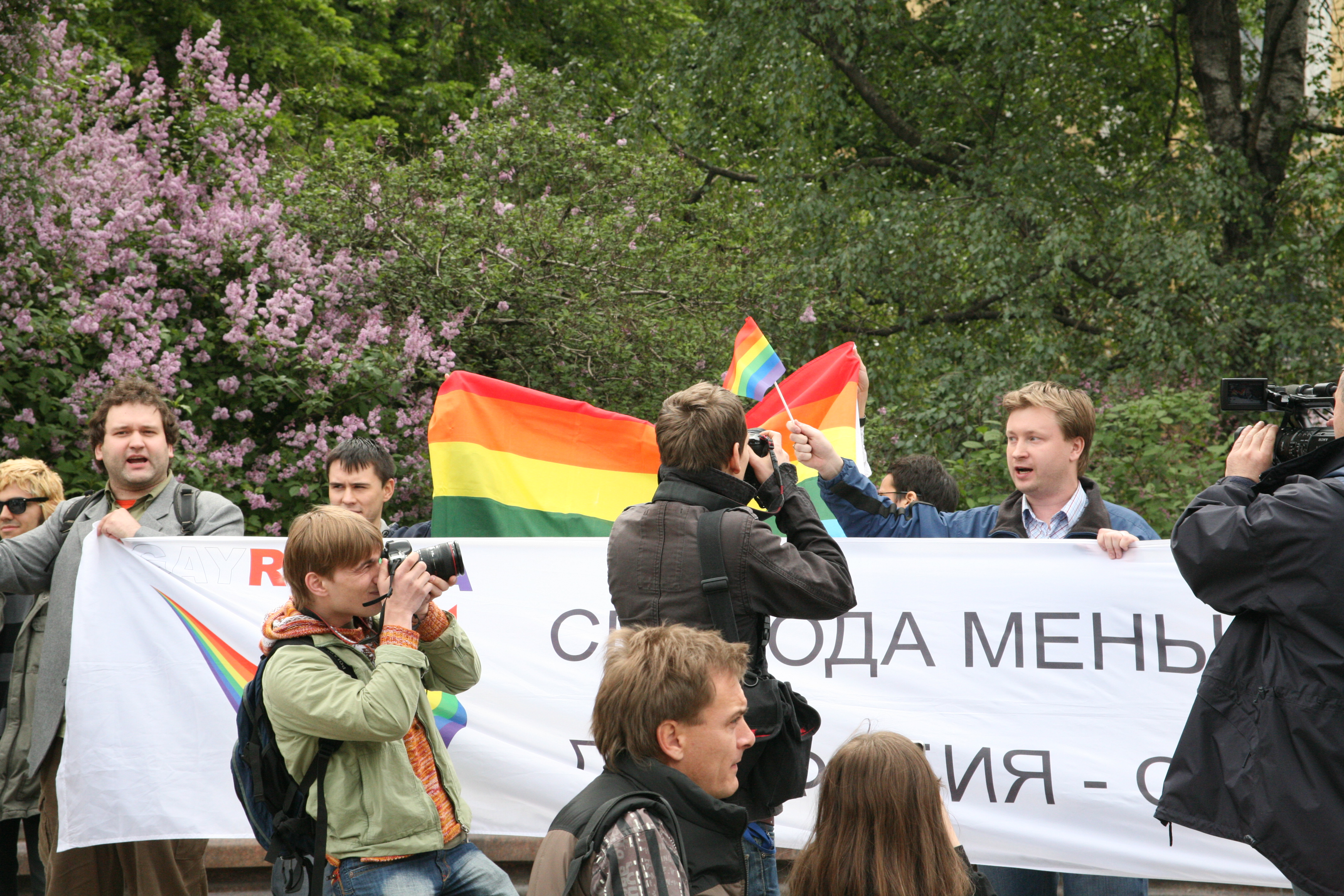
Photo of the Moscow Pride 2008 on June 1, 2008.

Organizers applied for five marches in different locations per every day in May, but Moscow Mayor banned all the 155 events saying that "they will endanger public order and cause negative reaction of the majority of the population". President of Russia, Dmitry Medvedev, phoned the Prefecture of the Central Administrative area of Moscow and told him to authorise the gay demonstration, nevertheless, authorization was refused. Organizers introduced the ban of all marches to the European Court of Human Rights after they lost in Russian courts. The event took place on Sunday June,1 in two locations : First, a flashmob protest which gathered around thirty LGBTQ activists led by Nikolai Alekseev in front of the Statue of famous Russian music composer Tchaikovsky and second they unveiled a banner quoting "Rights to Gays and Lesbians. Homophobia of Mayor Luzhkov should be prosecuted" from the third floor of a building in front of the Moscow City Hall. The trick of the activists worked. While they were able to have their flashmob protest without being assaulted or arrested in a different location, they symbolically made their protest in front of the City Hall and avoid clashes with protesters as they were not on the ground.

== Moscow Pride 2009 hosted the first Slavic Pride ==
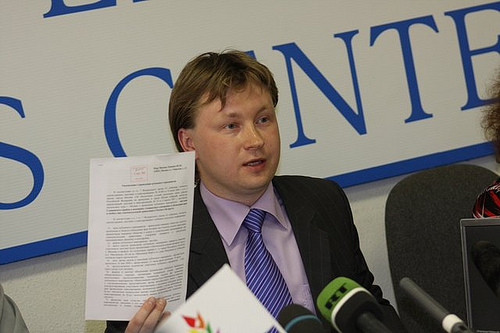
Press Conference Slavic Pride 2009

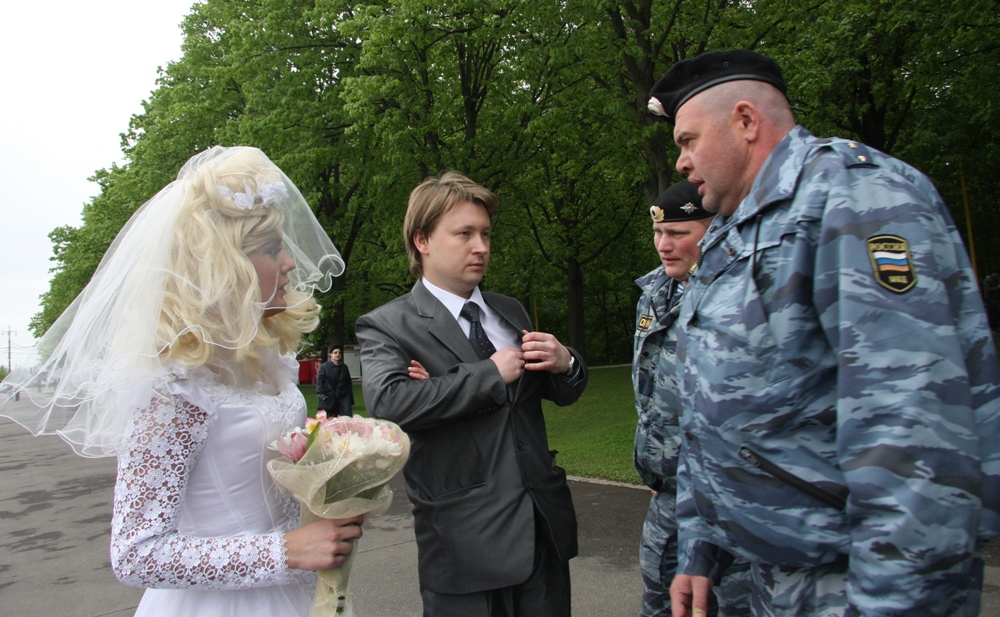
Nikolai Alekseev at the Slavic Pride on May 16, 2009. Two OMON (riot police) officers stopped Nikolai Alekseev and his bride, a transsexual activist from Belarus, and asked for his ID papers before arresting both.

The 2009 edition of Moscow Pride took place on May 16, 2009, the same day as the finale of the 2009 Eurovision Song Contest being hosted by Moscow, and on the eve of the International Day Against Homophobia. The parade was called "Slavic Pride, as it will promote gay rights and culture from across the entire Slavic regions of Europe. A group of 15 Belarusian activist led by Sergey Androsenko, the leader of Gaybelarus. Peter Tatchell and Andy Thayer were the only foreigners to take part in this demonstration, all other participants came from Russia and Belarus. Although Moscow government has had a history of denying requests for authorization of such parades, it was stated that as with previous years, the parade would go on no matter what.

Ultimately, the parade was denied authorization by Moscow officials, but Nikolai Alekseev praised the decision, considering the parade a risk that must be taken, "otherwise the homophobes and authoritarians will win". Moscow officials had issued statements regarding this matter, stating that protesters would be treated "toughly" and would face "tough measures" by the police department. The protest was originally announced as taking place at Novopushkinsky Skver in central Moscow, but organizers changed the location at the last moment to the Vorobyovy Gory viewpoint near Moscow State University, a popular spot for wedding photographs to avoid queer-bashing attacks as in previous years.

The demonstration was under the motto "Gay Equality - No compromise"; postulating the recognitition of same-sex marriage, also see Recognition of same-sex unions in Russia. Protestors were arrested within minutes, while being filmed by television crews, including state-financed Russia Today, among them Nikolai Alekseev and human rights campaigner Peter Tatchell, who exclaimed that "this shows the Russian people are not free" as he was taken away by police. The OMON troops were "needlessly violent", Peter Tatchell said. In violation of Russian law, activists were detained overnight. Belarusian activists were freed about 2 a.m. Nikolai Alekseev was held overnight in prison and was interrogated for hours at a time.

Some EU Embassies (UK, Sweden, Netherlands, Finland) which had been invited by the organizers to monitor the events on the spot, concluded that they did not find any ground to make a diplomatic actions. The activists commented it: "It shows that it is easier to act for the EU Embassies in smaller countries such as Latvia where several EU Embassies brought support but when it turns to be in Russia, things are different."

Samuel Žbogar, Minister for Foreign Affairs of Slovenia and chairman of the Committee of Ministers of the Council of Europe, expressed his concern about the action taken against the organisers of the Slavic Gay Pride parade in Moscow at the same night:

According to the established case law of the European Court of Human Rights, peaceful demonstrations cannot be banned simply because of the existence of attitudes hostile to the demonstrators or to the causes they advocate. The fact that this is not the first year such a situation has developed is of concern to the Chairman of the Committee of Ministers of the Council of Europe.

Nikolai Alekseev had written earlier to the Prime Minister of Slovenia in April 2009 asking him to take the issues with the Russian authorities.

== Moscow Pride 2010 ==
The 2010 Moscow Pride took place on May 29, 2010. Not unexpectedly, the Moscow Pride was banned the fifth successive year. The Gayrussia group appealed unsuccessfully the decision in court before the March. The organizers turned to foreign Embassies for political support like it has been the case in 2010 in Vilnius and Bucharest. "We turned to ambassadors of the EU states and ambassadors of Canada, the USA and Australia in Moscow with a request to hold a public action in the territory of the embassy," Mr. Alekseev said.

A press conference took place on May 27, speakers at the conference will be Nikolai Alekseev, Nikolai Baev, Volker Beck (First Whip of the Green Party in German Bundestag), Peter Tatchell, Louis-Georges Tin (President of the IDAHO Committee), Maria Efremenkova (Chairman Organizing Committee of St. Petersburg Gay Pride) and Andy Thayer (Gay Liberation Network Chicago).

== Slavic Pride 2010 ==
Activists from Russia and Belarus organized the second Slavic Pride in Minsk, Belarus on May 15, 2010.

== Moscow Pride 2011 ==
Activists saw hope for a successful 6th Annual Moscow Pride parade. In 2010, the European Court of Human Rights had fined Russia $40,000 for human right violations and damages, for the responses from 2006 through 2008. All the same, new Mayor of Moscow Sergei Sobyanin refused the parade's petition in February, and repeated his position two days before the May 28, 2011 festival.

Moscow Pride's organizer Nikolay Alexeyev held the event as planned. The parade lasted only a few minutes before an ultra-Eastern Orthodox protest group attacked the parade. Moscow police arrested over 30 participants, including three prominent gay rights activists: Americans Dan Choi and Andy Thayer; and France's Louis-George Tin.

== Views of Yuri Luzhkov ==
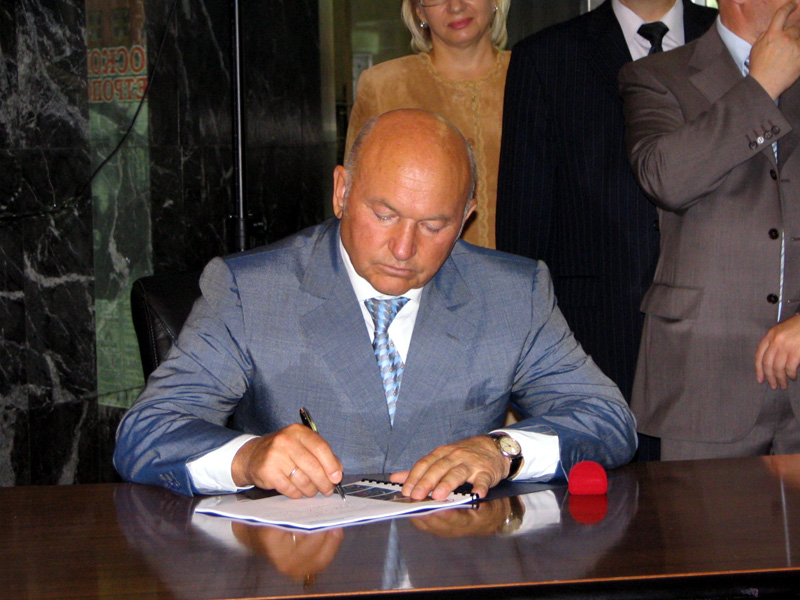
Yuri Luzhkov

Yuri Luzhkov, who was mayor of Moscow until being dismissed in September 2010, consistently opposed gay parades in the capital for a variety of reasons. In 2007 he attracted international attention when he said of the 2006 parade: "Last year, Moscow came under unprecedented pressure to sanction the gay parade, which cannot be called anything other than satanic. [...] We did not let the parade take place then, and we are not going to allow it in the future." He blamed groups which he accused of receiving grants from the West for spreading what he called "this kind of enlightenment" in Russia. "We think that destructive sects and propaganda of same-sex love are inadmissible", he said of attempts to promote gay rights in Russia. He also thanked Alexy II, the then head of the Russian Orthodox Church, for backing him in banning the 2006 Pride. In response, Moscow Pride organisers sued Luzhkov for slander. Nikolai Baev and Nikolai Alekseev sought a retraction of the statement that the parade was "satanic" and demanded 2,000 roubles (around $80) in damages. The suit was heard by the Moscow City Court, which found in favour of Luzhkov on 11 October. It decided that Luzhkov "had not attacked Alekseev and Baev personally, but only the gay parade in general, and also concurred that Luzhkov was expressing a personal opinion". The organisers plan to appeal to the European Court of Human Rights.

At an international AIDS conference in Moscow in 2008 Luzhkov said he would persist in banning gay pride parades in order to prevent the spread of HIV/AIDS. He commented:

We have banned and will continue to forbid this propaganda by sexual minorities, as they could turn out to be one of the factors in the spread of HIV infections [...] Certain homegrown democrats believe that sexual minorities can be a primary indicator and symbol of democracy, but we will forbid the dissemination of these opinions in the future as well.

Luzhkov's stance has received support from various religious groups, including the Russian Orthodox Church, Chief Rabbi Berl Lazar, and the Muslim Grand Mufti Talgat Tadzhuddin.

== Views of the Activists ==
=== Rights granted by the Russian Constitution ===
The Activists refer to their Constitutional / Civil Right of Freedom of Speech and Freedom of Assembly. Both rights are granted in the Russian Constitution (Chapter two, Article 29 and 31), and also in the European Convention on Human Rights (CETS 005, Article 10 and 11), which was ratified by the Russian Federation in 1998. Also, both rights are declared as Human Rights in the Universal Declaration of Human Rights (Article 19 and 20).

=== Verdict done by the Chamber of the European Court of Human Rights ===
After a gay pride in Warsaw, Poland, locally known as the "Parada Rownosci" (Equality Parade) was banned by the then City Mayor, Lech Kaczyński, the organizers of that pride introduced a case at the European Court of Human Rights in Strasbourg. Poland, represented by Lech Kaczyński has meanwhile been found guilty by the European Court of Human Rights for violating basic human rights such as the freedom of assembly with his actions against Warsaw Pride. See also Bączkowski v Poland. Subsequent Prides in Warsaw have been more peaceful events.

Organizers of the gay pride in Moscow are sure that there will be a positive decision by the European Court of Human Rights. Up to now, there are 175 cases pending at the European Court of Human Rights. On September 17, the European Court of Human Rights has given Russia until January 20, 2010, to answer the bans of the 2006, 2007 and 2008 Moscow Pride marches and pickets. Later, at the request of Russian authorities, this deadline was extended until February 20. The Memorandum of the Russian authorities insists that all public activities of the prides were banned in full compliance with the requirements of the European Convention on Human Rights and Fundamental Freedoms. The Memorandum indicated that the Moscow authorities were not able to guarantee the safety of the participants declared public events in connection with the fact that they had the opposition of the majority of the population. Also, the Memorandum referred to several decisions of the European Court of Justice relating to the limitation of the right to freedom of expression on the grounds of violating "public morality", taken in the 1970s and 1980s.

In their application to the European Court of Human Rights the claimants insist that the ban of the picketing on June 27, 2007, and its further confirmation in Russian courts, breached a number of Articles of the European Convention, including Article 11 (right to freedom of assembly), Article 14 (ban on discrimination) in conjunction with Article 11 and Article 13 (right to court protection).

On October 21, 2010, the European Court of Human Rights issued its verdict. The unanimous decision says that there had been a violation of the articles 11, 13 and 14 of the European Convention of Human Rights. The Court stressed that if the exercise of the right to peaceful assembly and association by a minority group were conditional on its acceptance by the majority, that would be incompatible with the values of the Convention. The Court held that Russia was to pay to Nikolai Alekseev 12,000 EUR in respect of non-pecuniary damage and 17,510 EUR for costs and expenses.

=== Strategy of Visibility ===
The Moscow Pride gave the activists a wide access to mass media or even massive media coverage. Andy Thayer, of the Gay Liberation Network Chicago, spoke out both before and after the Moscow Pride 2009 event:

The aim is to cause maximum embarrassment to the government if they attempt to arrest us or allow the neo-fascists to attack.

After a sentence or two praising the courage of Russian and Belarusian LGBTQ activists, I began speaking about how the police attack on gay and lesbian rights should be a concern of all Russians as it was an attack on their democratic freedoms. At just that point the OMOH cops grabbed and dragged me away, making my point much more effectively than any words I could have uttered.

The 4th annual gay Pride in Moscow was an unqualified success, with the political points of its organizers broadcast around the world, which can only serve to help isolate the anti-gay regime.

Peter Tatchell spoke about the aims of media visibility:

The Russian media has been full of reports about gay issues for the last week. This has hugely increased public awareness and understanding of gay people. Slowly, we are eroding homophobic attitudes. Through this media visibility, we are helping to normalise queer existence. After our successive gay protests in Moscow since 2006, people are less shocked about homosexuality. We have a long way to go, but gradually we are winning hearts and minds, especially among younger Russians. (...) The same has been true all throughout history. It has been direct action by radical campaigners like Mahatma Gandhi and Martin Luther King Jr. that has most dramatically and effectively overturned injustice. By adapting their tactics, the Slavic Pride coordinators ran rings around the Russian and Moscow authorities and put them on the defensive. (...) All in all, it was a PR disaster for the Russian and Moscow authorities, ensuring that Eurovision 2009 will be forever associated with police brutality, government homophobia and the suppression of a peaceful protest.

Possible consequences of ‘quiet lobbying’ instead was commented by Nikolai Baev in July 2009:

In Vilnius, the Lithuanian Seimas passed a Bill banning any discussions on homosexuality in schools and making illegal any "gay propaganda" in the media. Moreover, most of Lithuanian deputies on Tuesday annulled the presidential veto. (...) Also this week, the Ukrainian Culture Ministry banned the movie Brüno because of its "homosexual propaganda". (...) Latvia and Poland are no less homophobic societies than Lithuania, Ukraine and Russia. But already in early 2000s Latvian and Polish gay activists have chosen absolutely different strategy of LGBTQ visibility. First in Poland, then in Latvia, Gay Pride Parades were organised – the strongest and the most efficient gay events, both in media and in politics. Latvian and Polish activists had mounted a very hard legal and political battle against homophobic bans by local courts and authorities. Now Gay Pride Parades are held in Riga, Warsaw and Kraków. At the same time neither in Latvia nor in Poland have been passed such shameful laws introducing homophobic censorship like Lithuanian parliament did.

== See also ==
- Nikolai Alekseev
- LGBTQ rights in Russia
- LGBTQ rights in Belarus
- Recognition of same-sex unions in Russia
- Bączkowski v Poland
- Moscow Pride '06 (film)
- LGBT Human Rights Project Gayrussia.ru
- Olympic protests of Russian anti-gay laws
