= Gay Liberation Network =

American direct action organization

- Formation: 1998; 28 years ago
- Founders: Andy Thayer; Bob Schwartz
- Founded at: Chicago, Illinois
- Location: Chicago, Illinois, United States
- Website: gayliberation.net/blog/
- Formerly called: Chicago Anti-Bashing Network

The Gay Liberation Network (GLN) is a multi-issue LGBT direct action organization based in Chicago, Illinois. The group was founded in September 1998, after Matthew Shepard was murdered and three homophobic attacks took place in Boystown, Chicago. It was originally called the Chicago Anti-Bashing Network; the group changed its name in 2004 to the Gay Liberation Network. They describe themselves as "A Lesbian, Gay, Bisexual and Trans Direct Action Organization".

In addition to their LGBT advocacy, the GLN regularly campaigns with non-gay groups about issues concerning immigrant's and women's rights and the wars in Iraq and Afghanistan.

== Co-founder ==
Thayer co-founded the Gay Liberation Network in 1998; it was originally called the Chicago Anti-Bashing Network; the group changed its name in 2004 to the Gay Liberation Network. He is also the co-founder of Chicago Coalition Against War & Racism. Thayer has protested against the Iraq War, been investigated by the FBI, organized protests for marriage equality, traveled to Moscow, Russia to take part in a gay pride parade, and has been arrested numerous times in various protests.

== Activism and protests ==
Shortly after their formation in 1998, one of their first protests was against the anti-gay preacher Fred Phelps, who was making an appearance at a church in Chicago to speak out against same-sex marriage. Beginning in 2000, the organization frequently protested against the Chicago Police Department, for what they perceived as "anti-homosexual and racist attitudes", during arrests of LGBT citizens. The group was also active in protesting against Laura Schlessinger, for her derisive comments about the LGBT community. Schlessinger created controversy when she called gay people "deviants", and homosexuality a "biological error", and said that homosexuality was acceptable as long as it was not public. Schlessinger was slated to begin a TV talk show in 2000. The GLN said "we think that any responsible broadcaster wouldn't consider for a moment giving a nationwide TV show to someone who holds such hateful views".

In 2001, they supported, along with the ACLU, filing hate crime charges against a man who was verbally harassing gay Pakistani American poet Ifti Nasim in a Chicago restaurant. The GLN gained attention in 2004, when they got Chicago mayor Richard Daley to sign a petition in support of gay marriage. A spokesman for Daley later walked back the petition signature, saying Daley "had no problem with the issue of gay marriage, [but] is not taking a politically active role in supporting gay marriage". The GLN was later instrumental in helping to get SB 10 passed in Illinois, a bill which legalized same-sex marriage via a state statute in November 2013.

The GLN has been active in protesting against Jamaican singers Capleton and Buju Banton, who have received international criticism for their anti-gay lyrics that allegedly "promotes violence against gays and lesbians". In 2004, they protested and initiated a boycott against the Chicago House of Blues, when Capleton was scheduled to appear there. The venue however refused to cancel his appearance, stating "we are not in the business of censoring content". In 2009, working alongside the Los Angeles LGBT Center, they were successful in convincing Live Nation to cancel its portion of a tour by Buju Banton, who had called for the "murder of gays in his songs". And in 2010, a concert by Capleton at Kinetic Playground was canceled after pressure from the GLN.

The GLN successfully lobbied the Southern Poverty Law Center to list the anti-gay organization Americans for Truth about Homosexuality as an anti-LGBT hate group in 2010. They have also called for a boycott against the Salvation Army, for their "selective interpretation of the Bible to promote discrimination against LGBT people in employment benefits and leadership positions within the Army".

The group is also active in women's rights, immigration issues and the anti-war movement. In 2002, in anticipation of a war in Iraq, the group took out full-page ads in the Windy City Times and The Chicago Free Press, denouncing the "wholesale loss of life" a war would bring, and that the LGBT community would especially be affected by reductions in social services. They were also a signatory on a full-page ad that ran in The New York Times in 2003 against the invasion of Iraq. They participated in the 2008 United States immigration reform protests, and at a rally held in 2009, for the annual May Day immigration reform march, the GLN opined that the DREAM Act was a "noxious piece of legislation that preys on the poor". After Roe v. Wade was overturned in 2022, the GLN marched in Chicago alongside pro-abortion advocates on the anniversary in 2023, and stated that people in Illinois who are pro-abortion rights "can't be complacent because conservative judges have been appointed to key court positions and that's why we have to be in the streets".

Additionally, the GLN produces monthly episodes on Chicago Access Network Television, where they discuss various issues, including: an interview with a Black Lives Matter activist about the 'No Cop Academy' movement, to prevent AECOM from building a law-enforcement academy in Chicago. They have also discussed the incarceration of Japanese Americans during World War II, and the crisis in Honduras, and policies affecting Latin America.

== See also ==
- 20 March 2003 anti-war protest
- List of anti-war organizations
- Chicago Police Department controversies
- List of LGBT rights activists
- List of LGBT-related organizations and conferences
- List of LGBT rights organizations in the United States
