= Alexey Davydov =

Russian activist (1970s–2013)

- Алексей Давыдов
- Born: 1976 or 1977
- Died: 27 September 2013 (aged 36); Moscow, Russia
- Citizenship: Russia
- Years active: 2006–2013
- Organization: Solidarnost
- Known for: Pro-democracy and pro-LGBTQ activism in Russia; Co-founding Moscow Pride
- Movement: LGBTQ rights in Russia

Alexey Davydov (also spelled Alexei, Russian: Алексей Давыдов, 1976 or 1977 – 27 September 2013) was a Russian pro-democracy and pro-LGBTQ rights activist. With the former, he was involved with the anti-Putin political movement Solidarnost, while with the latter, he cofounded Moscow Pride alongside fellow Russian gay activist Nikolay Alexeyev. During the late 2000s and early 2010s, he was involved in numerous protests and demonstrations around Russia. In September 2013, he died of kidney failure. Following his death, The Huffington Post called him "one of Russia's most prominent LGBT activists", while Julia Ioffe of The New Republic reported that his death had left a "glaring hole" in the LGBTQ rights movement in Russia.

== Biography ==
According to Russian activist Nikolay Alexeyev, Davydov had been involved in the Russian LGBTQ rights movement since 2006. Prior to his involvement in that movement, Davydov had been active in pro-democracy protests with Solidarnost, a political group that expressed opposition to Vladimir Putin. According to Gay Star News, in 2007, he co-founded Moscow Pride along with Alexeyev. In June of that same year, Davydov was one of roughly two dozen individuals involved in a planned gay rights protest outside of the offices of the European Union in Moscow. The target of the protest was Yury Luzhkov, the mayor of Moscow, who had been an outspoken critic of LGBTQ individuals and, in his capacity as mayor, had banned pride parades in the city. While the protests had initially been sanctioned, the Moscow City Police rescinded the sanctioning, citing concerns that the protesting would interfere with nearby construction work. Speaking to the Associated Press, Davydov said, "Authorities in Moscow have broken the law again by not allowing our picket." Davydov and another protestor were ultimately arrested by police after trying to unfurl a banner. On 1 June of the following year, Davydov was attacked by members of the National Slavonic Union while speaking to reporters at a Moscow Pride event. In a report prepared by the United States Department of State, they stated that police arrested both the perpetrators and Davydov and did not file any charges against the attackers.

=== 2011 injury and health issues ===
In 2011, Davydov participated in a small protest conducted by Solidarnost to defend the right to freedom of assembly, during which time he was arrested. According to Pavel Chikov, head of the Russian human rights group Agora, police had violently disrupted the protest and broke Davydov's arm during his arrest, though the police denied that they were responsible for the injury. Due to the injury, which included multiple bone fractures, Davydov spent one month in a hospital. While in the hospital, Davydov, who was diabetic, developed acute kidney failure and began to undergo kidney dialysis. According to Chikov, Davydov's health deteriorated following his hospital stay. For instance, in a later trip to Voronezh to protest for gay rights, Davydov suffered from a bout of food poisoning that led him to experience his first coma. Concerning the cause of the injury, the Ministry of Internal Affairs stated that the police were not responsible, and no investigation into the matter was initiated by the Investigative Committee of Russia.

=== Later life ===
In July 2013, Davydov participated in a gay rights protest in Red Square. That same month, he protested outside of a children's library in Moscow by displaying a sign that said, "Being gay is normal." Following the protest, he became the first individual to be charged with violating the newly implemented Russian anti-LGBT law, which banned the spreading of "propaganda about non-traditional sexual orientations among minors". Davydov said that he hoped to challenge the law by forcing courts to address the vague wording of the law, hoping to escalate the case to the Constitutional Court of Russia. The following month, in one of the last interviews he gave before his death, he spoke to the American publication The New Republic. At that time, he was living in an apartment with two friends, including a fellow gay activist, in the Novogireyevo District of Moscow. He was receiving dialysis and disability assistance. In mid-September, he participated in a protest outside of the State Duma where he called the antigay stances of the politicians there a mental disorder.

=== Death ===
On 25 September, several protestors conducted a demonstration outside of the Olympic headquarters in Moscow in protest of Russia's anti-gay laws, which would be in effect during the 2014 Winter Olympics in the Russian city of Sochi. During the protests, 10 activists were arrested. Davydov had planned to participate, but that morning, he was admitted to the hospital. According to one of his roommates, he had become unconscious after a dialysis treatment, prompting them to take him to the hospital. On the evening of the next day, he entered into a coma. The following day, Friday, 27 September, while still in the hospital, he died at the age of 36.

While his cause of death was not immediately disclosed, it was later reported that his death was due to an infection, which he had contracted in August, that had led to kidney failure. According to his former roommate, Gleb Latnik, the doctor overseeing him had failed to perform hemodialysis on him, leading to his death. However, according to BuzzFeed News, Davydov had no immediate family and friends were unable to gain access to his medical records, which hurt their chances of pursuing any sort of legal actions over his death. Concerning the long-term impact that the police beating in 2011 had had on his health, Julia Ioffe of The New Republic said, "The police did not kill Davydov, in other words, but they sure didn't help."

Following his death, activists, including Alekseyev, created a Facebook page to raise funds for his funeral. British actress Tilda Swinton made a large donation, allowing the organizers to exceed their goals. His funeral was held on Monday, 30 September. During the memorial services for Davydov, anti-gay protestors shouted at mourners, saying, "What are these faggots doing here?" and "Moscow is not Sodom!"

=== Legacy ===
In their reporting on his death, The Huffington Post called Davydov "one of Russia's most prominent LGBT activists", while The Advocate called him a "leading Russian gay activist". Fellow Russian activist Alekseyev called him "the vanguard of the struggle for human rights in Russia." Concerning his relationship with Alexeyev, The Advocate said that the two had been close confidants, while BuzzFeed News said that Davydov was "widely viewed as a controlling influence" on Alexeyev. Ioffe of The New Republic reported that his death left a "glaring hole" in the LGBTQ movement in Russia, with activist Masha Gessen saying, "He was the creative force behind LGBTA direct action, and this is what makes one realize just how few people there are."

== See also ==
- LGBTQ culture in Russia
