= Kvir =

Russian gay lifestyle magazine

- Editor: Vladimir Voloshin
- Categories: Gay men's lifestyle, Men's
- Frequency: Monthly
- Publisher: www.gay.ru
- Founded: 2003
- Final issue: 2012 (as printed)
- Company: www.gay.ru
- Country: Russia
- Language: Russian

Kvir (Квир, from English queer) was a Russian gay lifestyle magazine. It was launched by www.gay.ru which runs the LGBT Center "Together", a non-profit organization. The magazine is a non-profit project designed to provide Russian society with correct and diverse information on homosexuality, to increase public tolerance of homosexuals, as well as to support and unify the gay community in Russia. It is also made to raise self-acceptance within the gay community. The magazine's name (Kvir) stems from the English word "queer".

== History ==
The glossy color magazine was first published in 2003. Yearly circulation was 33000 issues. "Kvir" entered the top five best-selling "men's magazines" in Moscow according to the rating of SIRPP - the Union of publishers and distributors of printed products in Russia in September 2004 and September 2006. The physical publication ceased in 2012 with 113 issues printed. KVIR is transitioned to an all-digital format and currently is an online Internet magazine.

In May 2022, access to the magazine’s website was blocked in the Russian Federation by the decision of Roskomnadzor.

== Publishing house ==
In addition to the magazine, the publishing house "Kvir" was established in 2005 with the book "69. Russian gays, lesbians, bisexuals and transsexuals". Since then, more than 30 books have been published. These are collections of prose and poetry by authors from Russia, Canada, USA, Italy, Germany and other countries of the world. The house publishes yearly mini-anthologies “Russian Gay Prose” and “Lesbian Prose”. Today, "Kvir" is the oldest publishing gay project in Russia.

== Authors ==
Among the authors of the magazine are fashion historian Alexander Vasilyev, writers Almat Malatov, Margarita Sharapova, Andrei Goncharov, Marusya Klimova, Dmitry Bushuev, playwright Konstantin Kostenko, publicist Yevgeni Ponasenkov. The magazine published photo shoots of Russian and international photographers - Serge Golovach, Seva Galkin, Olga Fomina, Igor Zeiger and others. The magazine published interviews with Roman Viktyuk, Svetlana Surganova, Yaroslav Mogutin, Boris Moiseev, Thomas Anders and many others.
