= Moscow Pride '06 =

2006 Russian documentary film

- Directed by: Vladimir Ivanov
- Produced by: Nikolai Alekseev
- Starring: Nikolai Alekseev; Nikolaj Bajev; Evgenia Debryanskaya; Foreign gay activists: Peter Tatchell; Louis-Georges Tin; Briand Bedford; Foreign politicians: Volker Beck; Sophie in 't Veld; Clémentine Autain
- Music by: Desireless
- Release dates: 2006 (Moscow, Russia)
- Running time: 84 min.
- Country: Russian Federation
- Languages: Russian; English
- Budget: LGBT Human Rights Project Gayrussia.ru was the sponsor of the film

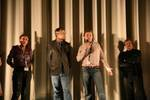
Photo of the Premiere of the documentary Moscow Pride '06 in the Berlin Film Festival in February 2007

Moscow Pride '06 is a 2006 documentary film about the 2006 gay pride parade in Moscow.

== Synopsis ==
The documentary features the events that took place around the first Moscow Pride festival in Russia's capital from May 25 to 27, 2006. Some focuses of the documentary include the Nordic festival, the Russian gay cultural contest, Merlin Holland's lecture on his grandfather Oscar Wilde, and the International Day Against Homophobia (IDAHO) first World Conference. Moscow Pride '06 also focuses on the troubles around the Kremlin and Moscow City Hall when participants gathered to protest the ban of the Pride march as well as the Tverskoi District Court decision to uphold Mayor Yuri Luzhkov’s ban on the march.

== First Private Screening in Moscow ==
The documentary was first screened during a private projection at the National Film Centre in Moscow where 60 guests gathered at the invitation of the film director and producer. German journalists from RTL Television and ZDF were among the guests.

At the premiere, Nikolai Alekseev, Moscow Pride Chief Organizer said:

We are proud because this movie is an important work that will stay in history. It’s the first long documentary that deals with LGBTQ issues which took place in Russia. This is a living testimony that will be distributed in Russia and abroad. I am happy to see that a new generation of activists has emerged. Conformism and passivism are now behind us. We managed to generate passion and hope this finds its way into the hearts of many LGBT people in Russia and to revive the spirit of activism.

Vladimir Ivanov, the film's director, said: "I am very proud that I took part in this event". The first screening also marked Ivanov's 60th birthday and 35 years of his career in the Russian film industry.

Evgenia Debryanskaya described Moscow Pride 2006 as "historical – an event that will stay in history forever". Debryanskaya, leader of Russian lesbian movement, was arrested together with more than 200 activists in front of Moscow City Hall on the day of the Pride.

Nikolaj Bajev, one of the organizers, said "We have succeeded in bringing the subject of homosexuality into homes through the media". Vlad Ortanov, former editor of Argo, one of the oldest gay magazines in Russia, described the movie as "a great human historical document that will say a lot to the future generations". Nikolai Khramov, leader of the Russian Radicals movement at the time, the first political movement to support Moscow Pride, said that "this movie shows that there was something strong behind the gay pride and not only a desire of a few people to go in the streets".

Tamara B, who described herself as a heterosexual pensioner said: "Now, I understand what happened in Moscow and why they organized this action. But unfortunately, in the current political climate in Russia the majority of the population will never see it as it will be ignored by local TV."

== Selection at the 57th Berlin International Film Festival (Berlinale) ==
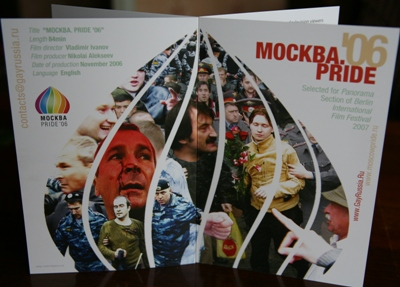
Brochure printed to present the documentary Moscow Pride '06.

The documentary was selected at the Berlin Film Festival in February 2007 and presented in the official programme of section "Panorama Documente" of Berlinale. It also entered the competition for the Teddy Award, an international award for LGBT films.

During the festival, three screenings took place:

- Cinema Coliseum, on February 11 at 3.30 pm (World Premiere)
- Cinema CineStar 7, on February 14 at 8 pm
- Cinema CineStar 7, on February 15 at 2.30 pm

Nikolai Alekseev, Vladimir Ivanov, as well as Evgenia Debrianskaya attended the screenings in Berlin.

During the world premiere of the film, on February 11, Wieland Speck, the head of Panorama section and one of the founders of Teddy Award, led a discussion on the movie. Volker Beck, the German MP whose attack at Moscow Pride is shown in the Film, appeared to answer questions from the audience together with Nikolai Alekseev, Vladimir Ivanov and Evgenia Debryanskaya.

As an introduction to the movie Wieland Speck said from the stage, "Even here in Berlin we had to appeal for the help of the police to avoid any incidents... This is further proof of the difficulties that the organisers and participants of the first Moscow Gay Pride have to face."

Speck was referring to the police presence in the theatre after threats of attacks from nationalists had been received prior to the Premiere. The presence of Speck is very rare at such screenings.

During the Teddy Awards Ceremony on February 16, the Mayor of Berlin, Klaus Wowereit, introduced Nikolai Alekseev and Evgenia Debryanskay to the audience: "Courageous organisers of the pride from Moscow, risking their lives, conducted the event in Russian capital which was banned by city authorities".

Volker Beck was also invited as a speaker during the ceremony. While he was sharing with the audience the difficulties faced by the LGBT community in Poland and Russia, images of his attack at Moscow Pride were shown on big screens.

== Secondary screenings of the movie ==
- London, United Kingdom, March 2007

The Gay and Lesbian Humanist Association (GALHA) Film Festival presented the movie on Saturday 17th at the exclusive private screening room at the One Aldwych Hotel.

- Luzern, Switzerland, November 2007

The movie was shown on Sunday 18th at 6.30 pm at the Stattkino during the Pink Panorama – LesBISchwules Festival Luzern. Before the screening, Nikolai Alekseev was invited to introduce the film and answered questions from the audience. The speech was moderated by Christoph Schmitt.

== Short Version of the Documentary ==
A 12 minute version of the documentary was produced just after the first Moscow Pride took place. It was first shown a day before the Torino Gay Pride (Italy) on June 16, 2006, at 6 pm at the Centro Congressi Regione Piemonte.

== See also ==
- LGBT Human Rights Project Gayrussia.ru
- LGBT rights in Russia
- LGBT culture in Russia
