= Chicago Coalition Against War & Racism =

Non-Governmental Organization against war and racism

Chicago Coalition; Against War & Racism
- Successor: Chicago Committee; Against War and Racism
- Formation: 2001; 25 years ago
- Founders: Andy Thayer
- Founded at: Chicago, Illinois
- Purpose: Direct action; Anti-war movement
- Location: Chicago, Illinois, United States
- Website: ccawr.org

Chicago Coalition Against War & Racism (CCAWR) was formed in September 2001 to protest the imminent United States invasion of Afghanistan. As of 2018, they had changed their name to Chicago Committee Against War and Racism. CCAWR gained a foothold in Chicago street politics and rose to prominence when it organized a rally at Federal Plaza the day after the U.S. invaded Iraq on March 20, 2003.

== Activism and protests ==
During the March 20 protest, about 10,000 Chicagoans marched and took over Lake Shore Drive in a direct action that led to national news. The Chicago Police Department reported that 543 people were arrested in the protest and that 353 of them were charged, mainly with reckless behavior. (Note: Other sources have reported the number of arrested at "about 900 people" or "more than 900 people".NBC Chicago 2011; Chicago Tribune 2012; Courthouse News 2011) In April 2003, as a result of those arrests, the Chicago chapter of the National Lawyers Guild filed a class action lawsuit against the city and the police department for what it claimed was the "unlawful arrest and imprisonment of hundreds of people". The lawsuit alleged that the police used illegal tactics like "herding, sweeping and pinning" of the bystanders and protesters. The city agreed to pay $6.2 million to the arrested protesters to settle the lawsuit.

In 2002, they were part of a protest at Northwestern University in Evanston, Illinois, against "Israel's treatment of Palestinians" and the local police department who had questioned at least three Arabs. On the 8th anniversary of the U.S. war and occupation of Iraq, the CCAWR was part of 1500 protesters who were demonstrating against the U.S. military getting involved in Libya. The group was one of the main organizers that arranged protests during the 2012 Chicago summit, a meeting that included heads of state and heads of government of NATO. Thousands of protesters showed up to express their opposition to NATO.

In 2018, on the 50th anniversary of the 1968 Democratic National Convention in Chicago, the CCAWR organized a protest on a wide range of issues, like the wars in the Middle East to the "funding of the military at the expense of public services". In 2021, members of the organization demonstrated at Federal Plaza, "demanding the Biden administration move forward with policies that will end the war in Yemen during his first 100 days in office".

== See also ==
- 20 March 2003 anti-war protest
- Anti-war movement
- List of anti-war organizations
- List of peace activists
- Peace

== Sources ==
- "Hundreds March in Mag Mile Anti-War Protest". NBC Chicago. March 19, 2011. "Federal Judge Richard Posner said police acted "without justification" when they arrested about 900 people at a downtown protest on March 20, 2003."
- Heinzmann, David; Dardick, Hal (June 5, 2012). "City owes $11 million for wrongful arrests in 2003 Iraq War protest". Chicago Tribune. "[...] mass arrests at the end of a March 20, 2003, Iraq War protest march [...] some 900 people who were detained or arrested on charges that were later dropped."
- Celentino, Joe (March 22, 2011). "Chicago May Be Liable for Busting Anti-War Rally". Courthouse News Service. "More than 900 people who were arrested by Chicago police during a 2003 protest of the Iraq War can sue the city, the 7th Circuit ruled."
