= Dan Choi =

American LGBT activist (born 1981)

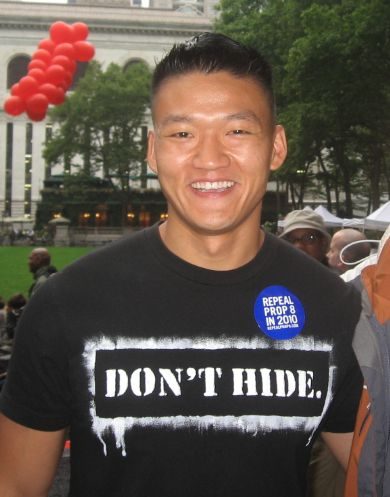
- Choi at an LGBT pride rally in Bryant Park
- Born: February 22, 1981 (age 45)
- Military career
- Allegiance: United States
- Branch: United States Army
- Service years: 1999–2010
- Rank: First Lieutenant
- Conflicts: Operation Iraqi Freedom

Dan Choi (born February 22, 1981) is an American former infantry officer in the United States Army who served in combat in the Iraq War during 2006–2007. He became an LGBT rights activist following his coming out on The Rachel Maddow Show in March 2009 and publicly challenged America's Don't Ask, Don't Tell policy, which forbade lesbian, gay and bisexual (LGB) service members from serving openly.

On October 19, 2010, Choi applied to rejoin the US Army.

== Early life ==
Choi is a native of Tustin in Orange County, California, the son of a Korean-American Baptist minister. He graduated from Tustin High School then attended the United States Military Academy at West Point. Choi has also taken courses at the Harvard Extension School.

Choi was very active with extracurriculars during his high school years. He served as student body president, was on the varsity swim team, and was the marching band drum major. During his senior year, after watching Saving Private Ryan, he decided to attend West Point.

== Military education and career ==
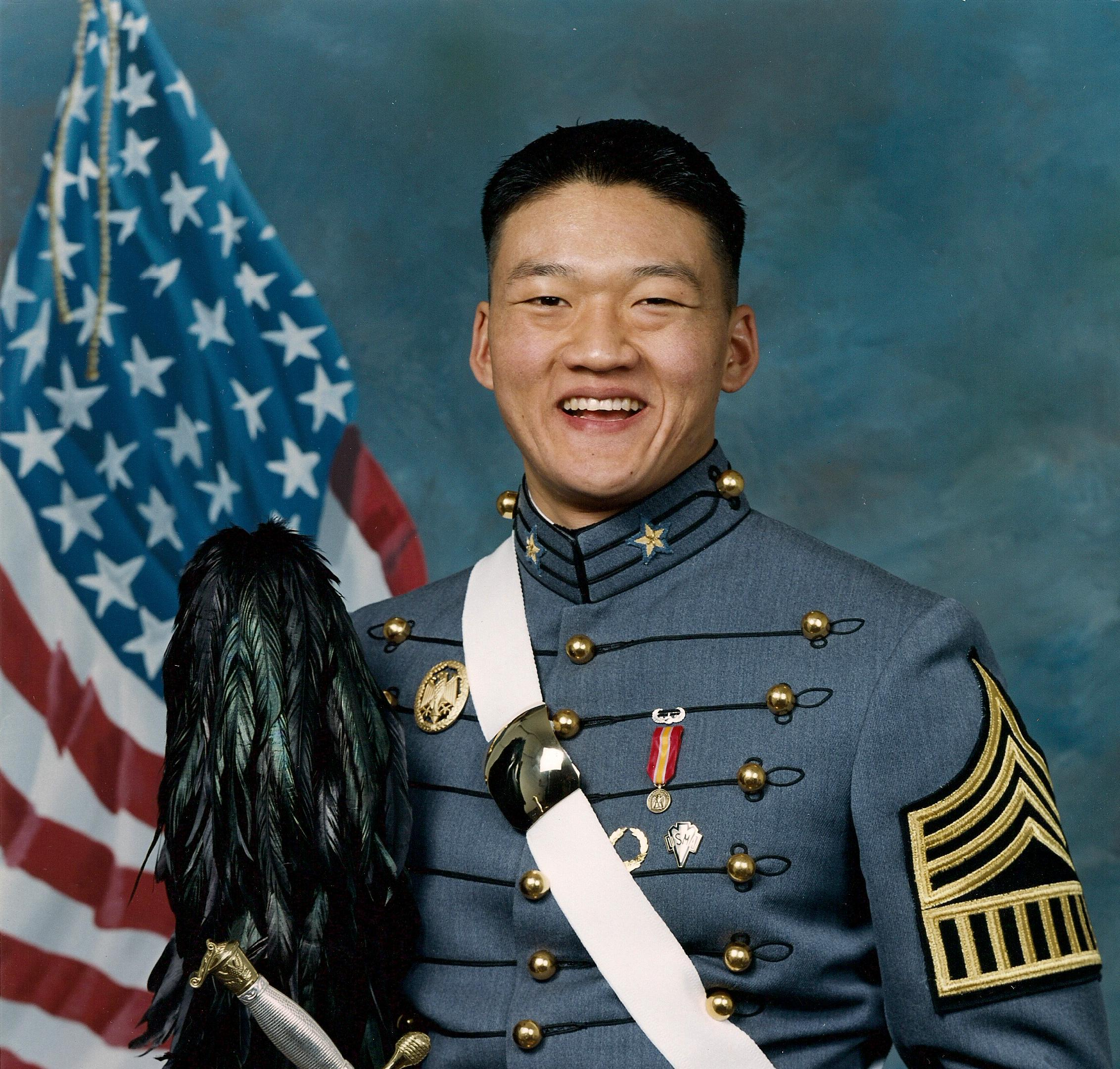
Cadet Choi on his West Point graduation portrait, 2003

Choi graduated from West Point in 2003 with degrees in Arabic and environmental engineering. Choi served as an infantry officer in Iraq with the 10th Mountain Division in 2006 and 2007. In June 2008, he transferred from active duty Army to the New York Army National Guard. Choi served as an Army guardsman with the 1st Battalion, 69th Infantry, based in Manhattan.

Choi received a discharge letter following his coming out on The Rachel Maddow Show. In response, Choi penned an open letter to U.S. President Barack Obama and the United States Congress. In the letter, Choi challenged the morality and wisdom of Don't Ask, Don't Tell, writing that the policy is "a slap in the face to me. It is a slap in the face to my soldiers, peers and leaders who have demonstrated that an infantry unit can be professional enough to accept diversity, to accept capable leaders, to accept skilled soldiers."

Despite his appeal and a Courage Campaign petition signed by almost 162,000 people, on June 30, 2009, a panel of New York National Guard officers recommended that Choi be discharged from the military. As of February 2010, Choi was serving again in his Army National Guard unit, the discharge having not yet been "finalized". On June 29, 2010, Choi's discharge was finalized.

Choi is among 59 gay Arabic linguists, along with nine gay Farsi linguists, who have faced a discharge from the U.S. military from 2004 through 2009, according to the Servicemembers Legal Defense Network.

== Gay rights activism ==
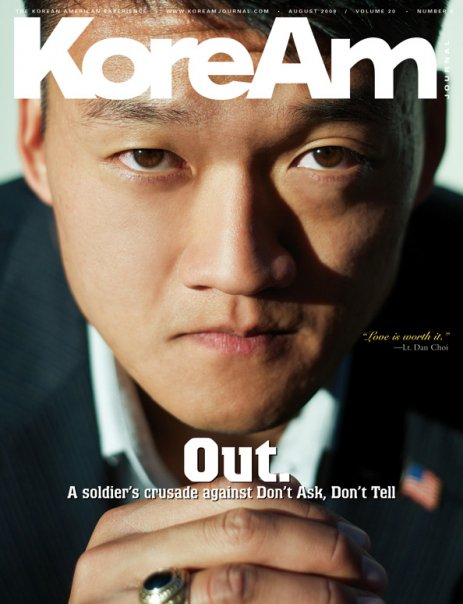
On the cover of KoreAm, August 2009

Since Choi's coming out, 38 West Point alumni also came out and announced the formation of Knights Out, an organization of West Point alumni who support the rights of LGBT soldiers to serve openly. Choi was one of the founding members and is the spokesperson for the group. The organization offers "to help their alma mater educate future Army leaders on the need to accept and honor the sacrifices of lesbian, gay, bisexual and transgender troops."

Choi has also spoken at numerous gay rights events, including a march in Los Angeles following the California Supreme Court's affirmation of Proposition 8. On May 27, 2009, he addressed a demonstration of gay activists outside the Beverly Hilton Hotel, where President Barack Obama was speaking at a Democratic National Committee fund raising event. In addition, Choi spoke at the 2009 Pride Rally in New York City and served as a Grand Marshal alongside Knights Out in San Francisco's 2009 Gay Pride Parade.

On July 16, 2009, Choi was in Culver City, California, to introduce the premiere of Abe Forman-Greenwald's documentary called Silent Partners. The documentary is the fourth episode in the In Their Boots series, with the episode focusing on the partners of LGBT soldiers deployed to Iraq and Afghanistan. In the episode, Choi criticizes the U.S. military's neglect of the partners of service members.

In February 2010 Choi was selected to be a Grand Marshal of the 41st Annual New York LGBT Pride March by its producers, Heritage of Pride. At the event, Choi led the Pledge of Allegiance at the New York City Council Chambers.

In March 2013, Outright Libertarians announced that Dan Choi was joining the GLBTQ caucus of the Libertarian Party as an honorary board member.

In June 2013, Choi and numerous other celebrities appeared in a video showing support for Chelsea Manning.

=== 2010 protests and arrests ===
On March 18, 2010, Choi and another ousted military officer, Capt. Jim Pietrangelo, handcuffed themselves to the fence of the White House. They were eventually removed with the use of a master handcuff key and arrested. Choi and Pietrangelo were initially set to be tried for "failure to obey a lawful order" on April 26, 2010. Trial was postponed until July 14, by which time the charges against both men had been dropped.

On April 20, 2010, Choi and Pietrangelo again participated in a self-chaining protest on the White House fence with Petty Officer Larry Whitt, Petty Officer (Rtd.) Autumn Sandeen, Cadet Mara Boyd and Cpl. Evelyn Thomas. All six were removed with a master hand-cuff key and arrested.

On May 27, 2010, Choi and Pietrangelo began a hunger strike until President Obama ends DADT and adds a non-discrimination policy to the military code. They ended the hunger strike seven days later, with Choi saying, "The fast of the past seven days has been a success because people have been educated to the use of fasting as a tool to bring attention to a set of clear political and social demands."

In November, 2010, Choi again handcuffed himself to the White House fence with 12 other protestors. He was subsequently arrested and charged in Federal court. The case of United States v. Choi took more than two years to conclude. On March 28, 2013, Choi was convicted of a misdemeanor charge of "Failure to Obey Lawful Order" and fined $100.

=== Court ruling ===
Dan Choi being interviewed in New York City, July 2011.

On October 12, 2010, U.S. federal judge Virginia Phillips ordered the Department of Defense to stop enforcing "don't ask, don't tell", the law that prohibited openly gay people from serving in the military. On October 19, Judge Phillips further refused a federal government request to stay the order pending appeal. That same day, Dan Choi went to the Times Square recruiting station in New York to rejoin the U.S. Army (referred to in one source as "reaccesion"); his request is in process. Choi reaffirmed his intention to rejoin the service on December 19. Following the repeal of "don't ask, don't tell" by Congress, Choi was present at the U.S. Interior Department to attend President Obama's signing of the bill on December 22, 2010.

=== 2011 arrest in Moscow ===
On May 28, 2011, Choi was among a number of both Russian and foreign activists (including Louis-Georges Tin and Andy Thayer) who were arrested by Moscow police when Moscow Pride was held in spite of a ban by city authorities.

== See also ==
- United States v. Choi
- Sexual orientation and the United States military
