= United States v. Choi =

2011 criminal case

- Court: United States District Court for the District of Columbia
- Full case name: United States of America v. Daniel Choi
- Docket nos.: 1:10-mj-00739
- Prosecution: Angela S. George
- Citation: 818 F. Supp. 2d 79

Case history
- Subsequent actions: Cert. denied, 566 U.S. 1022 (2012)

Court membership
- Judge sitting: Royce C. Lamberth

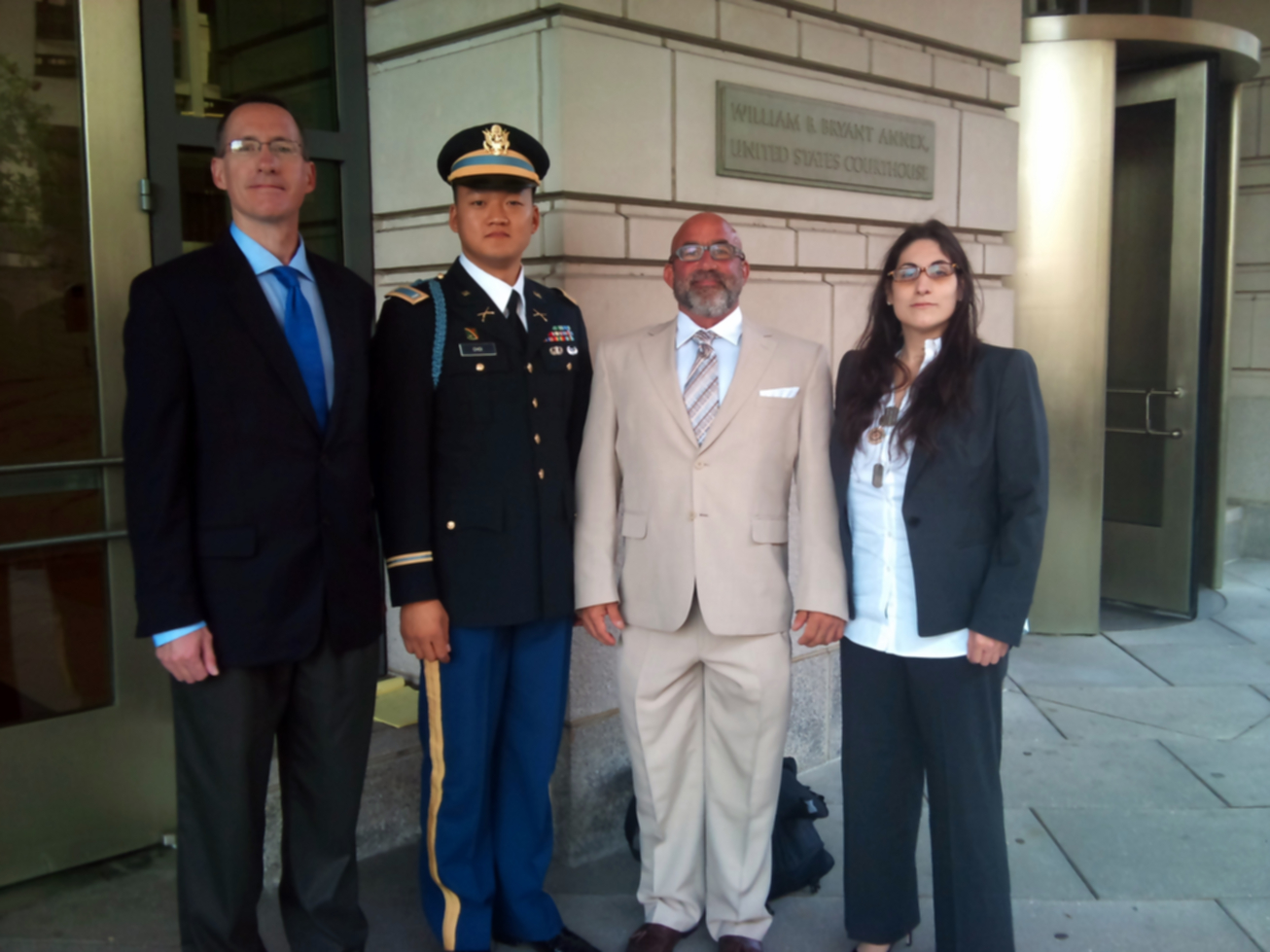
United States v Choi day 1

United States v. Choi, 818 F. Supp. 2d 79 (D.D.C. 2011), was a federal criminal case in the United States District Court for the District of Columbia. In November 2010, Choi and 12 other protesters chained themselves to the White House fence in protest of the military "Don't Ask Don't Tell" policy, shouting "Let us serve." All 13 were arrested and charged federally. Choi rejected a plea bargain deal, and trial commenced on August 29, 2011, before United States Magistrate Judge John M. Facciola. It was halted by the prosecution after three days to pursue a writ of mandamus prohibiting the defense of selective and vindictive prosecution. After the writ was issued, Choi was convicted of a single misdemeanor charge on March 28, 2013, and fined $100.

== Charges ==
On November 15, 2010, a group of 13 gay-rights activists, including former Army Lieutenant Daniel "Dan" Choi stood on the masonry base of the White House fence and handcuffed themselves in protest of the military "Don't Ask Don't Tell" policy. The policy barred openly gay, lesbian or bisexual service members from revealing their sexual orientation. The 13 were arrested and charged with "Failure to Obey a Lawful Order", a United States Park Police regulation, Title 36 C.F.R. Section 2.32(a)(2).

At pre-trial hearings and conferences, prosecutors offered the group a wired plea deal. In return for pleading guilty to the charge, the group would have all charges dismissed after four months of no arrests upon probable cause. Choi refused to plead guilty, but the deal was offered to the other 12.

== Trial ==
Trial commenced for Choi on August 29, 2011. Prosecutor Angela George filed a motion in limine asking the judge to prohibit the defenses of impossibility and selective prosecution. Magistrate Judge John M. Facciola ruled against this motion until the submission of all evidence at trial. Prosecution called witnesses from the United States Park Police including the arresting officer, Lieutenant Robert LaChance, who testified to the existence of Secret Service advance knowledge of the protest. Defense team led by Robert Feldman (pictured above) filed a motion to compel evidence of Secret Service emails and issued subpoena to directors of Homeland Security and the Department of the Interior. After Choi himself testified in the defense case, Judge Facciola made a prima facie finding for selective and vindictive prosecution. Prosecution petitioned for a writ of mandamus to prohibit Judge Facciola from entertaining the defense, and the trial was stayed.

== Selective prosecution ==
Choi asserted pre-trial that the decision to federally prosecute the group of 13 protesters was selective enforcement of the regulations, noting a rally at the White House following the death of Osama bin Laden, where none of the revelers were arrested. Choi also asserted at trial that he was arrested two previous times, on March 18, 2010, and April 20, 2010, for the same conduct but charged at municipal court. During those prosecutions, all charges against Choi were dropped, without an official statement from the Washington D.C. Office of the Attorney General. Choi claimed the federal charges were a result of White House and prosecutor vindictiveness, to punish him for successfully asserting his constitutional rights to free speech. Choi pointed out that he was the only protester in history to stand federal trial for handcuffing himself to the White House fence. He claimed the wiring of the plea deal was an attempt to punish Choi although several of the others were never previously arrested. At trial, prosecution revealed an email between US Park Police detective Sgt. Timothy Hodge communicating with Department of Interior Solicitor Randolph Myers on prosecuting the group with federal charges. After evidence of White House LGBT Liaison Brian K. Bond alerting Secret Service, Homeland Security and US Park Police to the protest, three days prior, two of the 12 protesters withdrew their guilty pleas in order to stand trial with Choi. Their motions were denied by Magistrate Judge Alan Kay.

== Interlocutory petition for mandamus ==
On October 7, 2011, a mandamus hearing was held, and on October 11 a federal district court chief judge granted a writ of mandamus against a magistrate judge of the same district court, for the first time in history. In his opinion, Chief Judge Royce C. Lamberth expressed the rare nature of this action but granted the writ after finding the defense should have raised the selective and vindictive prosecution claim before trial. Judge Lamberth agreed with the prosecution's claim that responding to a selective prosecution claim would be too costly for the government.

Choi appealed this decision to the US Court of Appeals for the District of Columbia Circuit, and petitioned for a writ of mandamus prohibiting Judge Lamberth's writ of mandamus. He terminated his attorneys and proceeded pro se.

== Re-enlistment in the military ==
During the course of the trial, the "Don't Ask Don't Tell" policy was officially repealed and Choi, discharged under the policy in July 2010, attempted to re-enlist in the U.S. Army. However, he was told by recruiters that the federal trial prevented his re-enlistment.

== Civil suit ==
Choi filed a civil suit against the United States Park Police and Secret Service for the wrongful arrest on November 14, 2011. He also filed conspiracy charges against White House officials involved in the arrest and subsequent federal charges.
