= Andy Thayer =

American activist

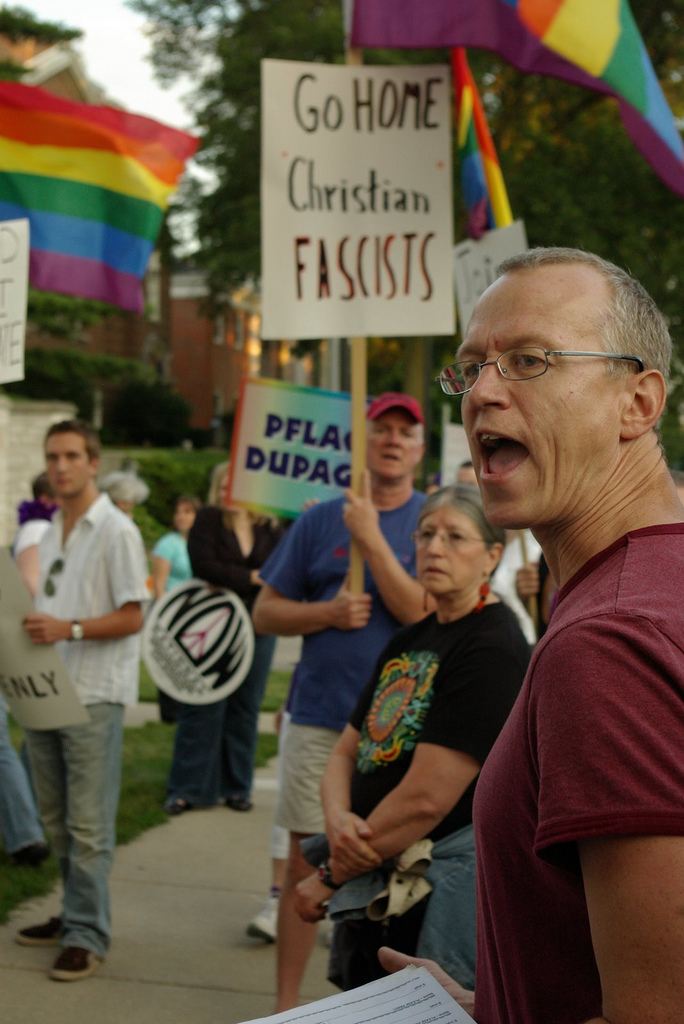
- Born: May 1, 1960 (age 66)
- Occupation: Political activist
- Website: Gay Liberation Network

Andy Thayer (born May 1, 1960) is an American socialist, LGBTQ rights and anti-war activist. He is co-founder of the Gay Liberation Network, one of the largest LGBTQ direction-action groups in Chicago. He is also the co-founder of Chicago Coalition Against War & Racism.

== Early life ==
Thayer was born in the state of New York. He and his family lived in Holland, New York. His father designed missile parts, and his mother was an activist who helped draft dodgers of the Vietnam War escape to Canada.

At the age of 17, Thayer wrote articles against corruption in his high school newspaper at Holland Central High School. His articles led to the school shutting down the school newspaper. Thayer later studied journalism at Northwestern University in 1978.

== Gay Liberation Network ==
Thayer founded the Gay Liberation Network in September 1998 under the original name "Chicago Anti-Bashing Network" which was changed to the Gay Liberation Network in 2004. The group is one of the largest and most-active LGBTQ direct-action groups in the area of Chicago.

== Anti-war activism ==
Thayer organized protests against the Iraq War.

On March 18, 2006, Thayer organized another march against the Iraq war down Michigan Avenue. Despite having permits, Thayer was directed by police to have the march earlier; Thayer refused to change the time, and started the march at 7pm, the original time he planned for and had on the permit.

=== March 20th, 2003 demonstration and arrest ===
On March 20, 2003, Thayer as one of the leaders of the Chicago Coalition Against War & Racism held a demonstration against the Iraq War that drew an estimated 10,000 – 15,000 people. Thayer was among those who were arrested.

The demonstration led to the arrest of anywhere from 500 to 700 people on Lake Shore Drive. Some of whom were demonstrators others who may have been bystanders.

In 2012, $6.2 million was awarded to those arrested in the settlement of a class action suit (Vodak v. City of Chicago).

=== March 19th, 2005 demonstration and arrest ===
On March 19, 2005, Thayer, as head of the Chicago Coalition Against War & Racism, organized a demonstration against the Iraq war which attracted over 1000 demonstrators. The demonstration was scheduled for March 19, but Thayer was denied a permit to demonstrate by the city of Chicago. Despite warning from the city and the Chicago Police Department (CPD), Thayer decided to hold the demonstration anyway in a form of a press conference.

Thayer was arrested on the corner of Michigan Avenue and Oak Street after holding a press conference instead of a march. Thayer was charged with disorderly conduct, resisting arrest, and violation of the permit ordinance. Thayer later appealed the arrest in 2005 arguing that the city violated his first amendment rights, but was officially denied in September 2012. As a result of his charges, Thayer was fined $1,000 by the city.

== FBI raid and investigation ==
In 2010, Thayer was one of twenty-three activists that had their house raided by the FBI due to "the material support of terrorism." The FBI claimed that Thayer and the other antiwar activists were providing material support to terrorist organizations like Hamas, the F.A.R.C. and many others.

No arrests were made in the investigation as there has not been any connection made between Thayer and terrorists groups.

In response to the raids of the twenty-three activists, demonstrations were held across the country against the FBI's harassment of Thayer and the other activists.

== Chelsea Manning ==
Thayer is a supporter of transgender whistleblower Chelsea Manning. Thayer has organized protests in support of Manning and serves on the advisory board for the Bradley Manning Support Network. For the past few years, Thayer has marched in the Chicago Gay Pride Parade with a message to pardon Manning of her crimes.

== Gay rights activism ==
Thayer founded the Gay Liberation Network in 1998. Thayer has organized protests for marriage equality and has called an end to the discrimination that LGBTQ people face. In February 2001, Thayer was arrested along with one other activist for attempting to chain and lock the doors of the Cook County's clerk building in protest of not being able to receive a marriage license. Thayer was charged with a felony and spent the night in jail and was later released on a $3,000 bail.

In 2008, Thayer organized a protest against Prop 8 in Chicago, the amount of demonstrators was in the thousands.

Thayer was one of the organizers and speakers at the 2013 March on Springfield for Marriage Equality on October 22.

In 2011, Thayer was arrested in Moscow alongside Lt. Dan Choi for taking part in a gay pride parade unsanctioned by the city.

In December 2013, Thayer visited Honduras to assist local LGBTQ activists with the fight for equality and to help monitor the Honduras presidential election.

== Personal life ==
Thayer is openly gay and currently lives in Chicago in the Uptown neighborhood. Thayer got engaged in November 2013 and married in the summer of 2014. Thayer is also an atheist.

== See also ==
- 20 March 2003 anti-war protest
- List of LGBT rights activists
