= Talgat Tadzhuddin =

Russian mufti and religious leader

Sheikh-ul-Islam Talgat Tadzhuddin
- Талгат Таджуддин; Тәлгать Таҗетдин
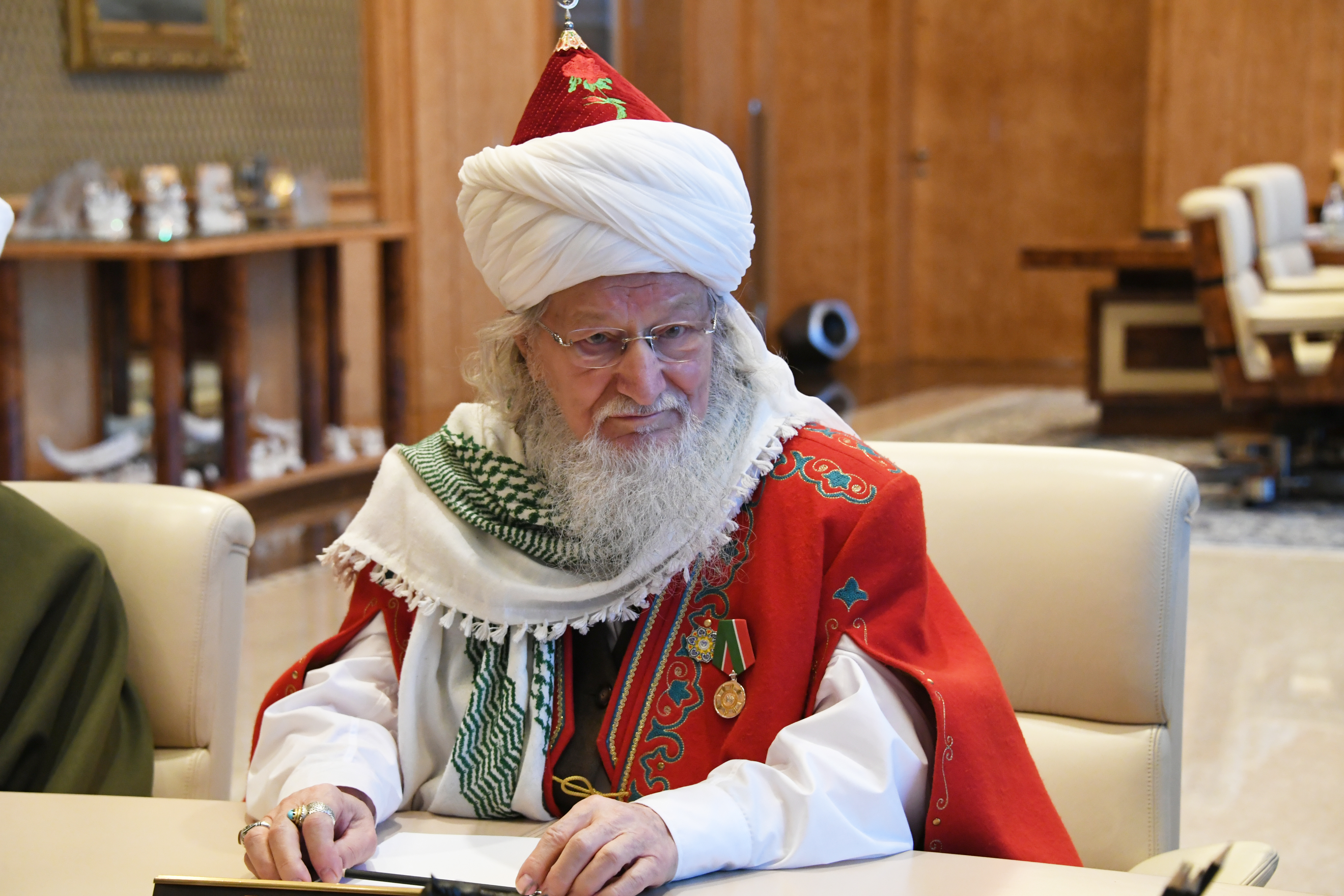
- Tadzhuddin in 2025

Personal life
- Born: 12 October 1948 (age 78) Kazan, Tatar ASSR, Russian SFSR, Soviet Union
- Citizenship: Russia
- Occupation: Grand Mufti

Religious life
- Religion: Islam
- Denomination: Sunni
- School: Hanafi school

Muslim leader
- Post: Chairman of the Spiritual Administration of the Muslims of the European Part of the USSR and Siberia (1980–1992); Chairman of the Central Spiritual Administration of the Muslims of Russia (1992–present)
- Awards: Order "For Merit to the Fatherland" 3rd class

Talgat Safich Tadzetdinov, better known as Tadzhuddin (Russian: Талгат Сафич Тадзетдинов / Талгат Таджуддин, Tatar: Тәлгать Сафа улы Таҗетдинев, Tälğät Safa ulı Tacetdinev; born 12 October 1948) is a Russian Shaykh al-Islām. He is Grand Mufti of Russia and Chairman of the Central Spiritual Administration of the Muslims of Russia, from 1980 to the present. Tadzhuddin is a polarizing figure in Russia due to his public statements, which include for example suggesting that participants of a pride parade should be attacked physically, and more recently, that the Russian invasion of Ukraine is a "necessary measure". Tadzhuddin supports Eurasianism.

== Biography ==
Talgat Tadzhuddin was born in Kazan, USSR, on 12 October 1948 to a Tatar family. His father was a lorry driver and his mother worked at a factory.

In 1966, he was admitted at the Mir-i Arab Madrassah in Bukhara (then in the USSR) where he graduated with honours in 1973. He also studied at Cairo′s Al-Azhar University in 1978.

In 1973, he was elected second imam khatib of the historical Märcani Mosque in Kazan and in 1978 he was elected first imam of the mosque.

On 19 June 1980, he was elected a mufti and chairman of the Spiritual Administration of the Muslims of the European Part of the USSR and Siberia (DUMES), one of four such directorates in the USSR then.

In May 1990, the conference of heads of Muslim Spiritual Directorates of the USSR elected him chairman of the directorate for international relations of the USSR′s Muslim organisations, later the Association of external relations of Muslim organisations, which he still heads.

In 1992, DUMES was transformed into the Central Spiritual Administration of the Muslims of Russia and the European countries of the CIS; the rank of Grand Mufti was created and bestowed on Talgat Tadzhuddin.

In December 2015 Tadzhuddin relinquished his administrative positions. However, on February 20, 2016, at an expanded meeting of the Presidium of the Central Spiritual Administration of Muslims in Ufa, a decision was made to cancel the farman decree. Thus, T. Tadzhuddin remained at his post.

== Public statements ==
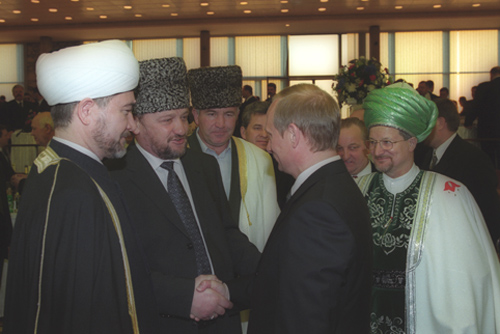
Ravil Gainutdin, Akhmad Kadyrov and Talgat Tadzhuddin (right) with president Vladimir Putin in May 2000.

Tadzhuddin has at least on one occasion claimed that he is a Bulgarian, arguing that Tatars are the descendants of Volga Bulgaria after it fell during the Mongol invasions.

In February 2006, Tadzhuddin joined leaders of the Russian Orthodox Church as well as the city of Moscow government in protesting against a planned gay pride parade in Moscow. He urged Russia's Muslims to stage violent protests if the march went ahead: "If they come out on to the streets anyway they should be flogged. Any normal person would do that - Muslims and Orthodox Christians alike [...] [The protests] might be even more intense than protests abroad against those controversial cartoons."

Tadzhuddin supports the Russian invasion of Ukraine and blames the Ukrainian government and "the Western world" for "trying to arrange a genocide [of the Russian people] and revive fascism".

Tadzhuddin supports Eurasianism and believes that Muslims and Christians in Russia together form a "unique civilization".

== Honours and awards ==
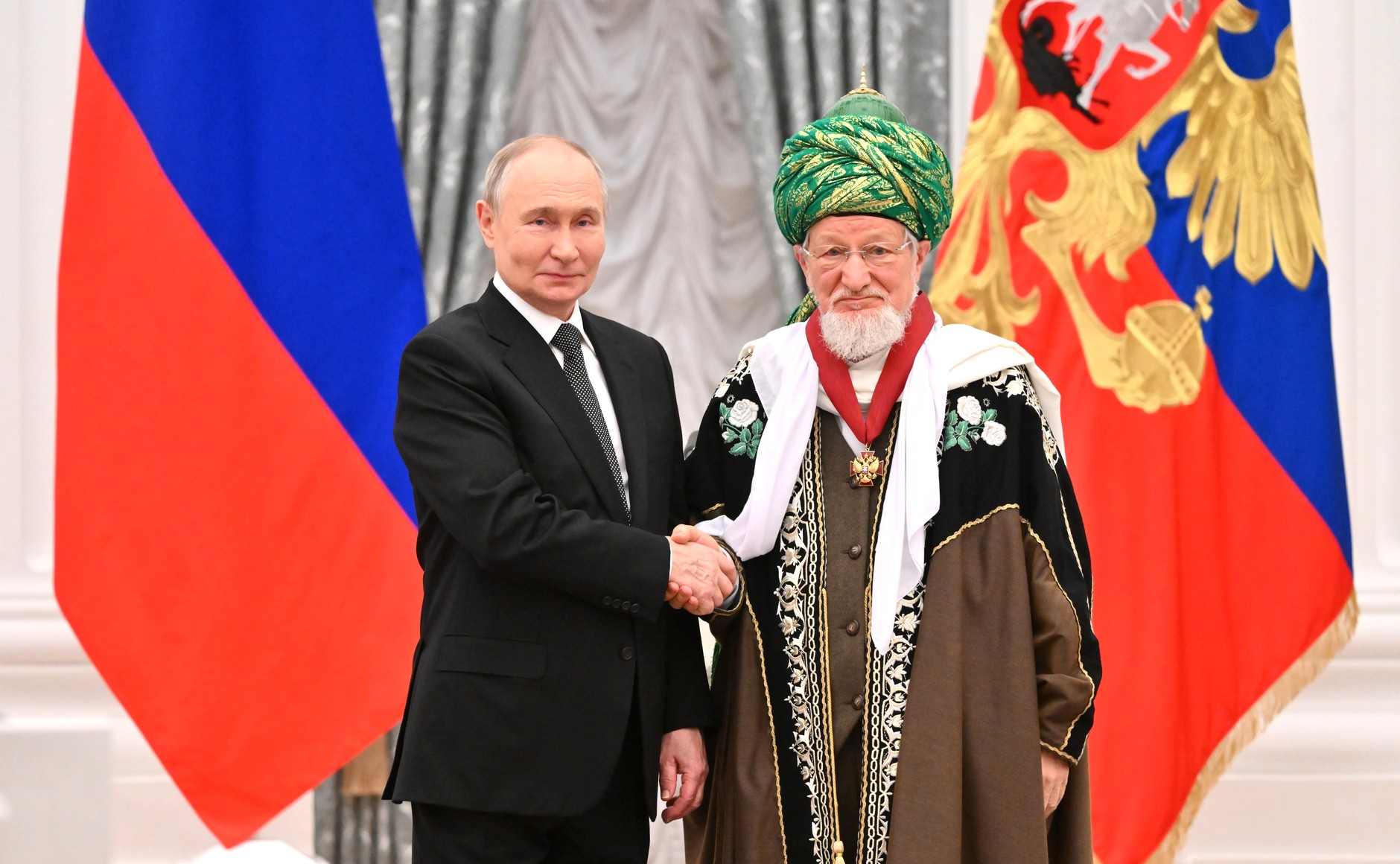
Presentation of the Order "For Merit to the Fatherland", 2nd class with President Vladimir Putin, 12 December 2024

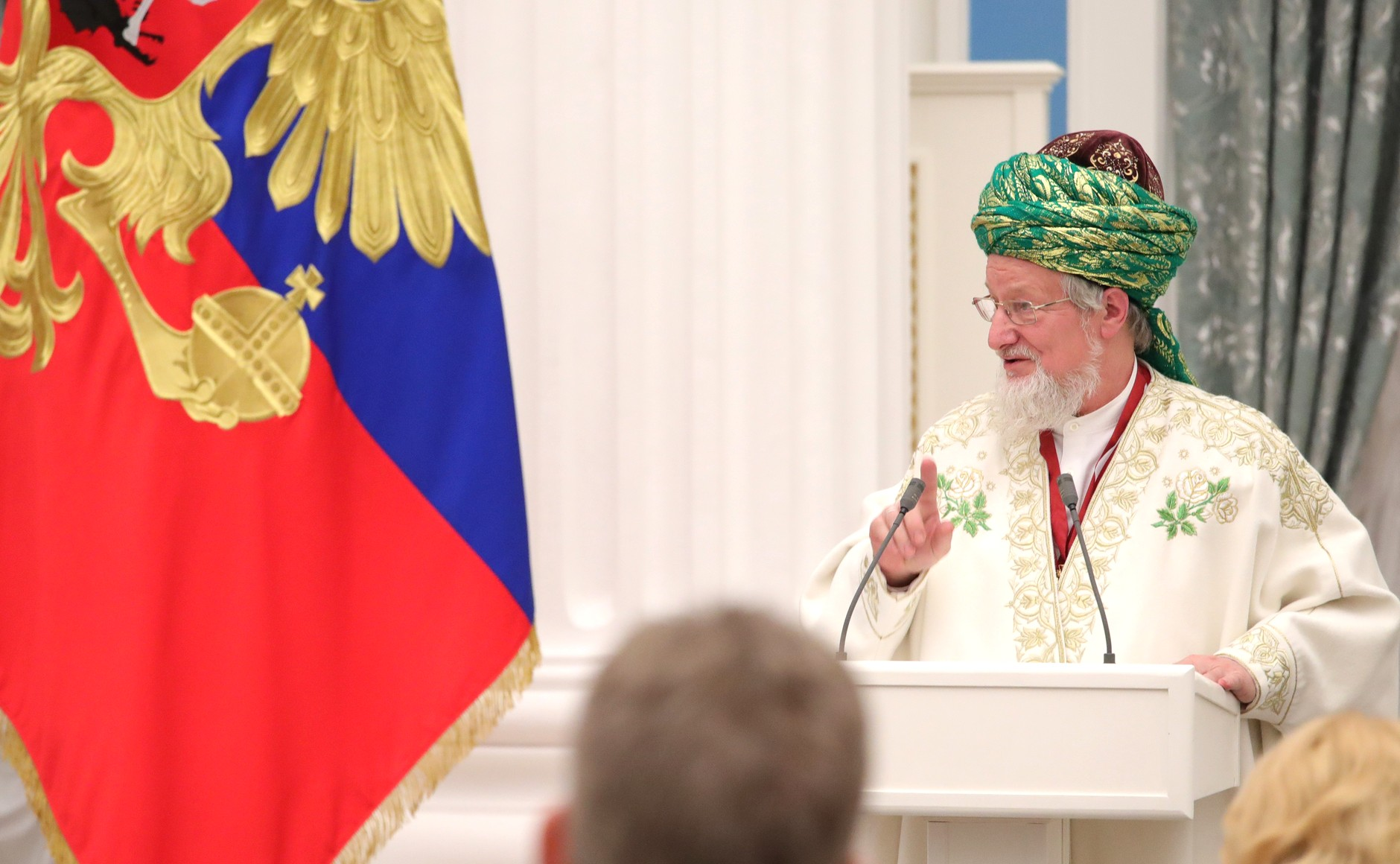
Presentation of the Order "For Merit to the Fatherland", 3rd class, 21 November 2019

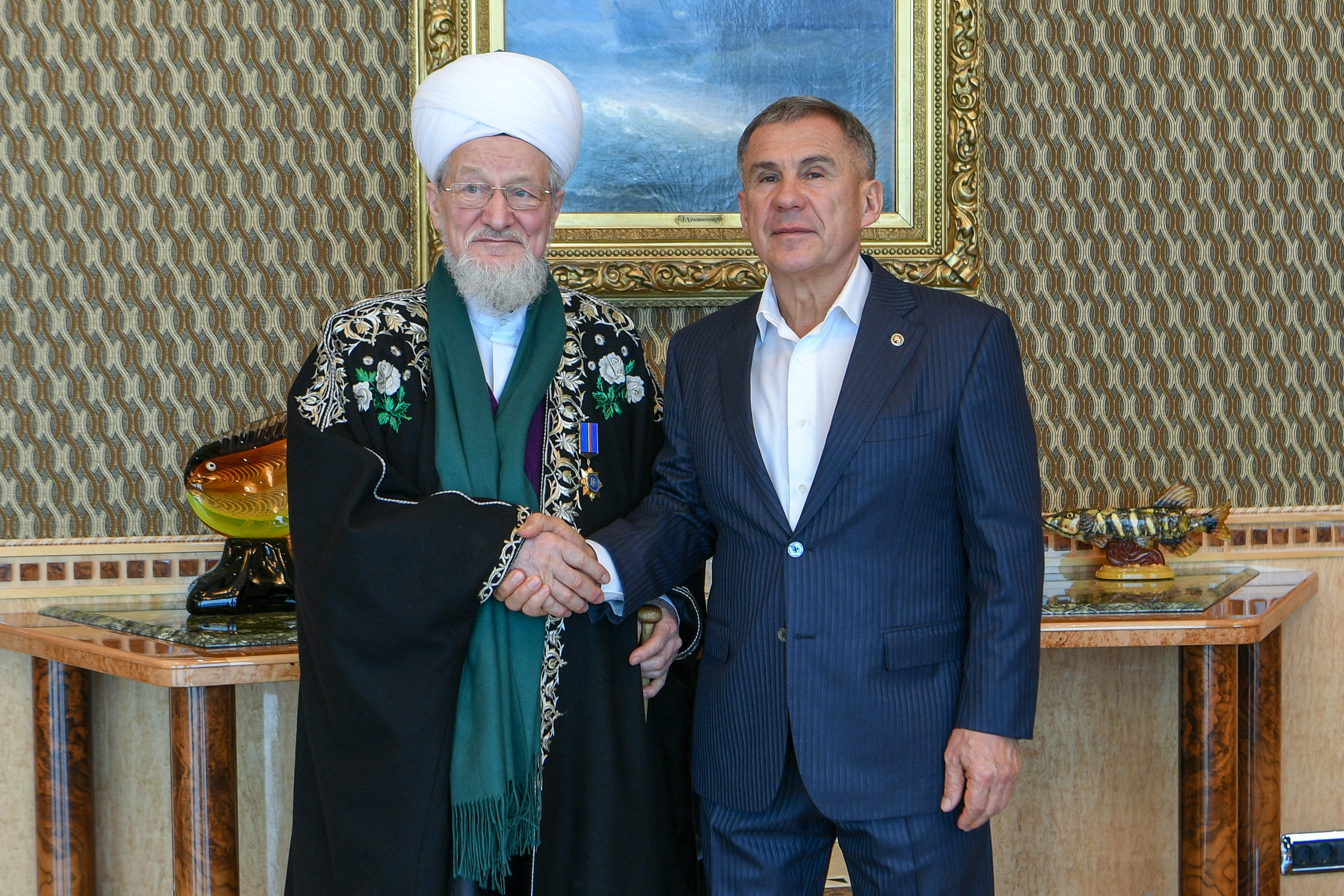
With Rustam Minnikhanov, 5 March 2019

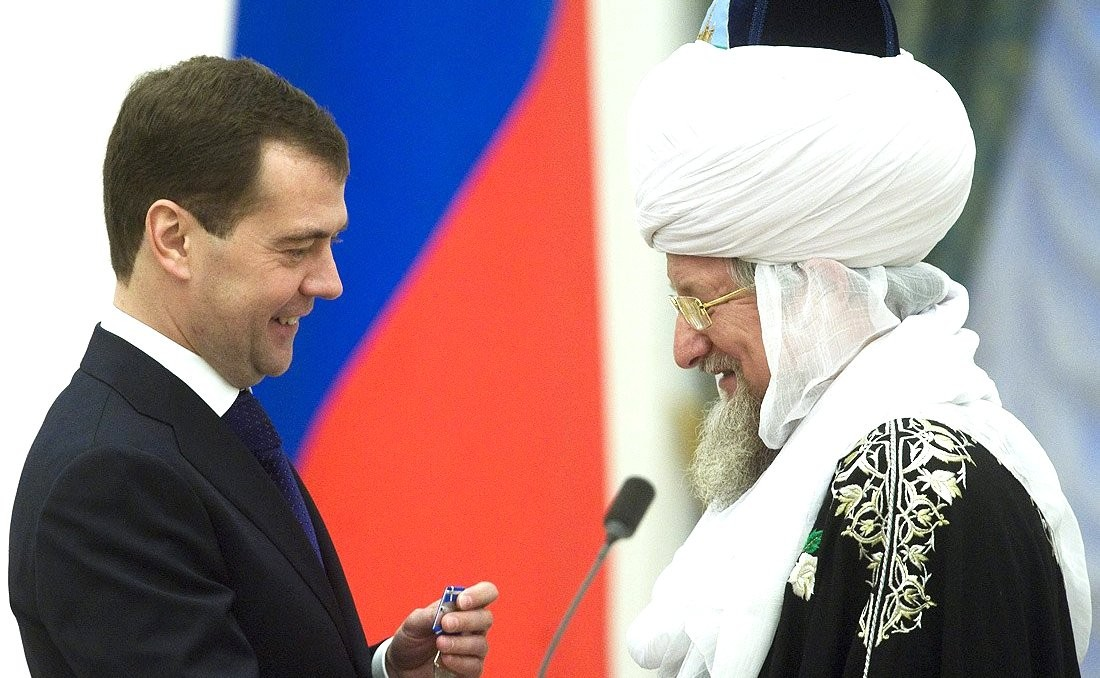
Presentation of the Order of Honour with President Dmitry Medvedev, 28 December 2009

- Order of Honour (12 October 2008) - for services to the development of spiritual culture and strengthening friendship between peoples
- Order of Friendship (21 September 1998) - for his great contribution to strengthening friendship and cooperation between peoples
- Order of St. Prince Daniil Moskovsky, 2nd class (Russian Orthodox Church, 2008) - for strengthening inter-religious peace and harmony
