= Serge Golovach =

Sergey Mikhaylovich Golovach (born June 3, 1970, in Birobidzhan, Soviet Union) is a contemporary artist. He uses body-art, performance art, panoramic photography, photo-films, silk screen printing, animation as well as pod-casting as artistic media. He regularly and actively participates in gallery and art museum exhibitions and projects, and contributes to the artistic concept of several magazines.

In 1986 he graduated from a local art school. In 2001 he graduated from DVAGS in Khabarovsk (Russian Far East), and in 2006 obtained a DMAN through the "Seminar for Young Managers of Cultural Institutions and Museums in the Russian Federation" program in Celle (Germany, Lower Saxony). He moved to Moscow in 2001, where he had his first major exhibition that same year at the Union of Journalists' Center of Photography. Golovach continues to travel between Moscow and Vitebsk.

== Work ==
Golovach has created art projects of societal significance, including AIDS, tuberculosis and cancer. Such projects include "Eye to Eye. Women Against AIDS" (Polytechnic Museum, Moscow, 2008), a photo exhibition at the First Medical University for the Russian Red Cross for World TB Day 2012, or "GRüNLinie. Body Diagrams” & “Beauty Will Save The World” (2009).

=== Collections ===
- The State Russian Museum, Saint Petersburg, 2005
- Moscow Museum of Modern Art, Moscow, 2003 & 2009
- National Centre for Contemporary Arts, Moscow, 2003
- Moscow House of Photography, Moscow, 2003
- Far East Art Museum / Khabarovsk, 2002 & 2009
- Centre for Contemporary Art, Vitebsk, 2003
- Private collections : Sophia Trotsenko, Alexander Schumov Supremus, Nikolai Palaschenko, Sergey Popov, Andrey Malakhov, Sergey Kardanovskyi, Jorg Bongarts, Anna & Roman Mitanchin

=== Educational institutions ===
- Far-Eastern Academy of Public Service (2001)
- Deutsche Management Akademie Niedersachsen (2006)

=== Professional unions ===
He has been a member of the Union of Photo Artists since 2000, the International Association "Society of Designers" and the International Federation of Journalists since 2001, the Professional Union of Artists since 2003 and the Creative Union of Artists of Russian since 2009.

== Publications ==
=== Photo albums and magazines ===
- Nikon Photo Contest International 2000-2001, catalogue Tokio
- FotoBiennale, catalogue, Moscow 2002
- K.A.Efimov "Forbidden Themes", "Ganymedes" Tver 2002
- F.Mondimore "A Natural History of Homosexuality", "U-Faktorya" Ekaterinburg 2002
- I.S.Kon "The Male Body in Cultural History", "Slovo" Italy 2003
- "Eurasia", "Blue Iceberg" Paris-Saint-Petersburg 2003
- Art Klyazma, catalogue, Moscow 2003
- Gallery on Solyanka, catalogue, Moscow 2004
- FotoBiennale, catalogue, Moscow 2004
- DAR, catalogue, Moscow 2005
- "Fashion and Style in Photography", catalogue, Moscow 2005
- Malevich. Classic Avant-Garde-8, Almanach. 2005
- I.Isaev, A. Bartenev "Body-Art : People and Colours", "Niola XXI Century" Moscow 2005
- "Dead Times and Great Expectations", "Blue Iceberg" Paris-Saint-Petersburg 2005
- Photo Catalogue "Nude", "ArtCity" Klin 2006
- FotoBiennale, catalogue, Moscow 2006
- V. Tarasenko "64 Strategists. Book of Business Mutations", "Genesis" Moscow 2006
- "Men for Men. Homoerotism and Male Homosexuality in the History of Photography Since 1840". Random House, London, 2007
- "Stars Against AIDS", catalogue, Moscow 2008
- FotoBiennale, catalogue, Moscow 2008
- "Best of Russia - 2008", catalogue, Moscow 2008
- "Eli Lilly MDR-TB Partnership in Russia", catalogue, Moscow 2008
- "Fashion and Style in Photography", catalogue, Moscow 2009
- "Best of Russia - 2009", catalogue, Moscow 2009

=== Publications in magazines ===
L`Officiel, GQ, Playboy, Sex and the City, Cosmopolitan, Magia Cosmo, Black Square, Hello!, Menu Magazine, the New Times, Foto & Video, Ом, Good House, Mezonine, Madam Figaro, Otdokhni, PhotoDelo, Dialogue of Arts, SNOB, Domovoy

=== Publications in newspapers ===
Kommersant, Vremya Novostey, Nezavisimaya Gazeta, Moskovskiy Komsomolets, Komsomolskaya Pravda, Vecherniaya Moskva, The San Diego Union-Tribune
