= 20 March 2003 anti-war protest =

Protest against the 2003 invasion of Iraq

On 20 March 2003, the day after the invasion of Iraq had begun, thousands of protests and demonstrations were held around the world in opposition to it. In many cases, these protests were known as "Day X" protests, reflecting the fact that they had been organized to occur when war started, whatever day that might have been. At least 350,000 people participated. The previous protests in February had been substantially larger.

== United States ==
In some United States cities, including Washington, DC, Chicago, San Francisco, New York, Pittsburgh, and Portland, Oregon, demonstrators blocked traffic in the city centers with the goal of shutting the cities down. In other cities, such as Boston, Atlanta, and Carmel-by-the-Sea, California, demonstrations were less confrontational. However in other cities, including Auburn, Indiana and St. Paul, Minnesota, people counter-demonstrated in support of the war.

In San Francisco, well over 5,000 protesters, having planned weeks in advance to shut down the city on "Day X" as part of Direct Action to Stop the War, blockaded the Financial District resulting in 2,200 arrests. Other protesters, marching as a black bloc, attacked and looted several military recruitment centers. A Critical Mass of cyclists also attempted to block traffic to the Bay Bridge. Approximately 300 protesters demonstrated outside of the federal building. Some of the protesters apparently began vomiting on the sidewalks and plaza areas in front of the building and behind the building. Spokespeople told reporters that it was the protesters' way of saying that war in Iraq "made them sick." Seven demonstrators were arrested after attempting to block about twenty federal employees and other visitors trying to enter the building.

Similarly, over 100 protesters were arrested in Philadelphia after blocking the entrances to various federal office buildings.

In Chicago, a massive gathering of some 10,000 people was held at the Federal Plaza, followed by a seemingly spontaneous march up Lake Shore Drive during rush hour. The march was originally in the northbound lanes, but the march spilled into the southbound lanes also stopping traffic going both ways. At some point, marchers at the front decided to jump the dividers and head over to Michigan Avenue (the touristy Magnificent Mile). The police who had been mild-mannered until then began to get afraid of something akin to the World Trade Organization protests in Seattle in 1999 happening and started to call for back-up and block the protesters from reaching Michigan Avenue. The march was eventually blocked at Chicago Water Tower from going down Michigan Avenue. The police closed the protesters in from both sides and wouldn't let them move or leave. At this point, the group of protesters had dwindled down to 600 or so. After an hour, many protesters wanted to leave but were unable to. They began chanting things like: "Let us leave. We have to pee." Every ten minutes or so, three or four police officers would go into the crowd and beeline for a certain person (possibly those the police believed were organizers) who they would grab and arrest. The police arrested more than five hundred protesters, and detained several hundred more.

== Worldwide ==
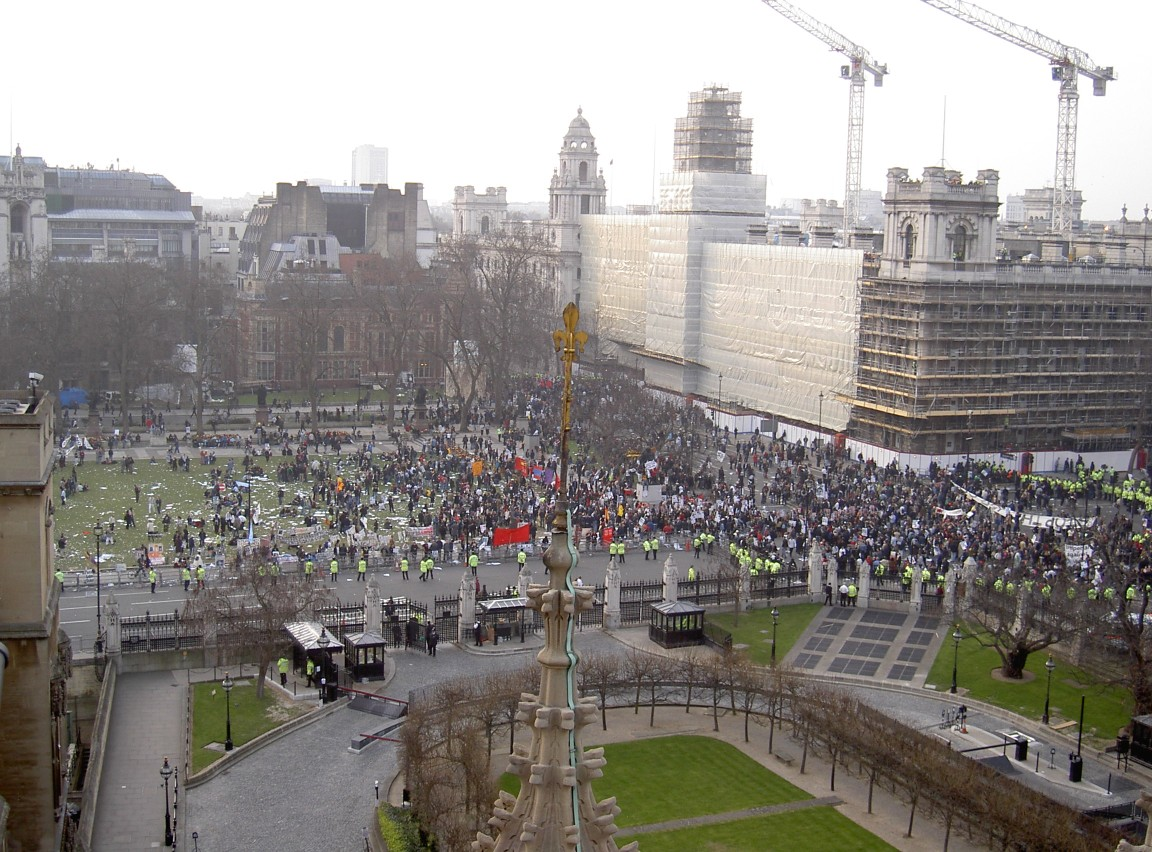
Anti-war protesters gather in Parliament Square in London, on the afternoon of March 20, as seen from the roof of the Palace of Westminster

On the morning of March 20, 2003, school students all over Germany held spontaneous marches; in Berlin more than 120,000 marched. Actions started also in Heidelberg, Frankfurt, Leipzig and Nuremberg. Some students reported that their teachers and principals had tried to prevent them from doing so. In Munich, students gathered in front of the university and then marched to the US consulate, where they demanded that the US flag be lowered in honor of the killed Iraqi civilians. They walked to the central place of Munich afterwards, where the demonstration turned into a mixture of party and protest.

There were demonstrations across the United Kingdom. In York, school students joined council and union representatives in a daytime demonstration. A school student responded to a BBC journalist's question of whether it was just an excuse to bunk off school by saying, "We're not just here for a day off school. The more supporters the better. It makes a bigger statement."

In Scotland demonstrations took place in disrupted traffic in Glasgow and Edinburgh and also took place in Dundee, Inverness and Aberdeen. The Edinburgh demo saw 500 people at midday march to the foot of The Mound, the rally was addressed by MSPs Tommy Sheridan and Lloyd Quinan. The protesters then blocked Princes Street and The Mound. Later 3,000 protesters marched up the Royal Mile to the Scottish Parliament. In Glasgow around 1,000 protesters (BBC estimate) blocked the streets in the city center for several hours.

Protests in most other cities were similar. In Switzerland, tens of thousands demonstrated in all major cities. In Italy, the public services union announced a strike. In Cairo, Egypt, 50,000 people rioted; protesters burned a US flag, and riot police outnumbered the protesters. In Paris, 20,000 people met in front of the American embassy. In Greece, 150,000 people protested. In San José, Costa Rica, people marched against the US military intervention in Iraq.

== See also ==
- Protests against the Iraq War
