= LGBTQ history in the Soviet Union =

Life for lesbian, gay, bisexual, transgender, and queer (LGBTQ) people varied greatly under the Soviet Union. Throughout its existence (1922 to 1991), criminalisation of homosexual relations shifted. After the October Revolution of 1917, homosexuality was decriminalised in Soviet Russia with the repeal of the legal code of the Russian Empire, and this decriminalisation was confirmed with new criminal codes in 1922 and 1926. Under Joseph Stalin, the Soviet government reversed course in the late 1920s and promoted harsher policy against LGBTQ rights. In 1933, homosexuality was recriminalised in the Soviet Union, and Article 121, which prohibited male homosexuality, was added to the Soviet penal code in the following year. Following the death of Stalin, attitudes toward sexual issues in Soviet Union were liberalised, but discrimination against and persecution of LGBTQ individuals persisted. The LGBTQ rights movement accelerated during the glasnost period in the late 1980s, and in 1993, after the dissolution of the Soviet Union Article 121 was removed from the penal code of Russia.

== Early history (1917–1927) ==
The government of the Russian Soviet Republic (later the Russian Soviet Federative Socialist Republic) decriminalised homosexuality in December 1917, following the October Revolution and the discarding of the legal code of the Russian Empire.

The legalisation of homosexuality was confirmed in the penal code of the Russian Soviet Federative Socialist Republic in 1922 as well as in its redrafting in 1926. According to Dan Healey, archival material that became widely available following the collapse of the Soviet Union in 1991 "demonstrates a principled intent to decriminalize the act between consenting adults, expressed from the earliest efforts to write a socialist criminal code in 1918 to the eventual adoption of legislation in 1922".

The legalisation of private, adult and consensual homosexual relations applied exclusively to the Russian Soviet Federative Socialist Republic and the Ukrainian Soviet Socialist Republic. Homosexuality or sodomy remained a crime in the Azerbaijan Soviet Socialist Republic, having been officially criminalised there in 1923, as well as in the Transcaucasian Socialist Federative Soviet Republic and the Central Asian republics throughout the 1920s. Similar criminalising laws were enacted in the Uzbek Soviet Socialist Republic in 1926 and in the Turkmen Soviet Socialist Republic the following year.

Despite decriminalising homosexuality in 1917, wider Soviet social policy on the matter of wider homosexual rights and the treatment of homosexual people in the 1920s was often mixed. Official policy in both the Russian Soviet Federative Socialist Republic and the wider Soviet Union in the 1920s on homosexuality fluctuated between toleration and support, attempts at legal equality and social rights for homosexual people, examples of open state hostility against homosexuals, and state attempts to classify homosexuality as "a mental disorder to be cured". During the 1920s, such divergences of opinion and policy on Soviet treatment of homosexuality were also common within the Communist Party, ranging from positive, to negative, to ambivalent over views about homosexuals and homosexual rights. Some sections and factions of the Bolshevik government attempted to improve rights and social conditions for homosexuals based on further legal reforms in 1922 and 1923 while others opposed such moves. In the early 1920s, Commissar of Health Nikolai Semashko for example was sympathetic to homosexual emancipation "as part of the [sexual] revolution" and attempted such reforms for homosexual rights in the area of civil and medical areas. According to Wayne R. Dynes, some sections of the Bolsheviks of the 1920s actively considered homosexuality a "[social] illness to be cured" or an example of "bourgeois degeneracy" while other Bolsheviks believed it should be legally/socially tolerated and respected in the new socialist society.

The Bolsheviks also rescinded Tsarist legal bans on homosexual civil and political rights, especially in the area of state employment. In 1918, Georgy Chicherin, a homosexual man who kept his homosexuality hidden, was appointed as People's Commissar for Foreign Affairs of the Russian Soviet Federative Socialist Republic. In 1923, Chicherin was also appointed People's Commissar for Foreign Affairs of the Soviet Union, a position he held until 1930.

In the early 1920s, the Soviet government and scientific community took a great deal of interest in sexual research, sexual emancipation and homosexual emancipation. In January 1923, the Soviet Union sent delegates from the Commissariat of Health led by Commissar of Health Semashko to the German Institute for Sexual Research as well as to some international conferences on human sexuality between 1921 and 1930, where they expressed support for the legalisation of adult, private and consensual homosexual relations and the improvement of homosexual rights in all nations. In both 1923 and 1925, Dr. Grigorii Batkis, director of the Institute for Social Hygiene in Moscow, published a report, The Sexual Revolution in Russia, which stated that homosexuality was "perfectly natural" and should be legally and socially respected. In the Soviet Union itself, the 1920s saw developments in serious Soviet research on sexuality in general, sometimes in support of the progressive concept of homosexuality as a natural part of human sexuality, such as the work of Dr. Batkis prior to 1928. Such delegations and research were sent and authorised and supported by the People's Commissariat for Health under Commissar Semashko.

== Under Stalin (1927–1953) ==
In the late 1920s and early 1930s, Soviet policy and attitudes shifted against homosexuality and homosexual rights, as did wider social backlash. Alongside increased repression of political dissidents and non-Russian nationalities, LGBT themes and issues faced increasing government censorship and uniformly harsher policy across the entire Soviet Union following Joseph Stalin's rise to power. Homosexuality was officially labelled a disease and a mental disorder in the late 1920s (specifically over a period from 1927 to 1930). In this climate, Commissar Semashko reduced his support for homosexual rights and Dr. Batkis and other sexual researchers repudiated (in 1928) their own earlier scientific reports of homosexuality as a natural human sexuality. This followed earlier Soviet tendencies in sections of the medical and health communities, even in the early 1920s, to classify homosexuality, if not as a crime, then as an example of mental or physical illness. Earlier examples of this type of hardening Soviet attitude towards homosexuality include the 1923 report from the People's Commissariat for Health entitled The Sexual Life of Contemporary Youth, authored by Izrail Gel'man, which stated: "Science has now established, with precision that excludes all doubt, that homosexuality is not ill will or crime but sickness. The world of a female or male homosexual is perverted, it is alien to the normal sexual attraction that exists in a normal person". The official stance from the late 1920s could be summarised in an article of the Great Soviet Encyclopedia of 1930 written by medical expert Sereisky (based on a report written in the 1920s):

Soviet legislation does not recognise so-called crimes against morality. Our laws proceed from the principle of protection of society and therefore countenance punishment only in those instances when juveniles and minors are the objects of homosexual interest ... while recognizing the incorrectness of homosexual development ... our society combines prophylactic and other therapeutic measures with all the necessary conditions for making the conflicts that afflict homosexuals as painless as possible and for resolving their typical estrangement from society within the collective

— Sereisky, Great Soviet Encyclopedia, 1930, p. 593

Under Joseph Stalin, the Soviet government recriminalised sex between men through a decree that was signed in 1933. The decree was part of a broader campaign against "deviant" behavior and "Western degeneracy". On 7 March 1934, Article 121 was added to the criminal code of the Soviet Union. It expressly prohibited male homosexuality, punishing "muzhelozhstvo" with the sentencing of up to five years of hard labour in prison. There were no criminal statutes regarding sex between women. During the Soviet era, Western observers believed that between 800 and 1,000 men were imprisoned each year under Article 121.

Some historians have noted that Soviet propaganda during this time began to depict homosexuality as a sign of fascism and that Article 121 may have been a political tool to use against dissidents, irrespective of their true sexual orientation, and to solidify Soviet opposition to Nazi Germany, which had broken its treaty with the Soviet Union. In a famous article in Pravda on 23 May 1934, Maxim Gorky said: "There is already a sarcastic saying: Destroy homosexuality and fascism will disappear."

In 1993, declassified Soviet documents revealed that Stalin had personally demanded the introduction of an anti-gay law in response to a report from deputy secret police chief Genrikh Yagoda, who had conducted a raid on the residence of hundreds of homosexuals in Moscow and Leningrad in August 1933, about "Pederast activists" engaging in orgies and espionage activities. Beyond expressed fears of a vast "counterrevolutionary fascist homosexual conspiracy", there were several high-profile arrests of Russian men accused of being pederasts. In 1933, 130 men "were accused of being 'pederasts' – adult males who have sex with boys. Since no records of men having sex with boys at that time are available, it is possible this term was used broadly and crudely to label homosexuality". Whatever the precise reason, homosexuality remained a serious criminal offense until it was repealed in 1993.

The Soviet government refrained from publicizing the new law outside of the Soviet Union, and there was little international response. In 1934, the British communist Harry Whyte wrote a long letter to Stalin condemning the law and its prejudicial motivations. He laid out a Marxist position against the oppression of homosexuals as a social minority and compared homophobia to racism, xenophobia and sexism. Stalin did not reply to the letter, but ordered it to be archived, and added a note describing Whyte as "An idiot and a degenerate."

A few years later in 1936, Justice Commissar Nikolai Krylenko publicly stated that the anti-gay criminal law was correctly aimed at the decadent and effete old ruling classes, thus further linking homosexuality to a right-wing conspiracy, i.e. Tsarist aristocracy and German fascists.

On 12 September 1937, Varvara Yakovleva, a bisexual woman who was the RSFSR People's Commissar for Finance, who had previously been in Leon Trotsky's Left Opposition from 1923–1927, and who had been the deputy head of the Petrograd Cheka from 1918–1922, was arrested by the NKVD and taken into custody. Yakovleva was charged with sabotage and terrorism against the Soviet Union, and of membership in a "Trotskyite-fascist diversionary terrorist organization", with interrogators bringing up her past same-sex relationships as "evidence" of her "Trotskyite-fascist tendencies". At a secret trial on 14 May 1938, Yakovleva was convicted of sabotage, terrorism and membership in a "Trotskyite-fascist diversionary terrorist organization", and was sentenced to 20 years in prison. She was held in solitary confinement at Oryol Prison, where she was executed on 11 September 1941 in the Medvedev Forest massacre, together with 156 other inmates. The Medvedev Forest massacre came less than three months after the German invasion of the Soviet Union, and 26 days before Nazi troops invaded Oryol. The Medvedev Forest massacre was one of the many NKVD prisoner massacres committed in 1941.

At the time of Yakovleva's arrest in 1937 and conviction in 1938, the NKVD agency executive was Nikolai Yezhov. It was Yezhov who oversaw the most brutal repressive period of Stalin's Great Purge. Despite this service to Stalin, Yezhov fell from Stalin's favour in 1938 and left his NKVD leader post in November 1938. On 10 April 1939, Yezhov himself was arrested by the NKVD, which was now run by Lavrentiy Beria, with Yezhov taken into custody. Yezhov stated during his interrogation that he had many lovers, including Filipp Goloshchyokin, the then party functionary in Kazakh ASSR, during the latter half of 1925, and that they had shared an apartment in Kyzylorda. On 4 February 1940, Yezhov was shot in the basement of a small NKVD station on Varsonofevskii Lane (Varsonofyevskiy pereulok) in Moscow. The basement had a wall made of logs and a sloping floor so that it could be hosed down after executions, and had been built according to Yezhov's own specifications near the Lubyanka. The main NKVD execution chamber in the basement of the Lubyanka was deliberately avoided to ensure total secrecy.

== Under Khrushchev (1953–1964) ==
When Stalin came to power, homosexuality had become a topic unfit for public depiction, defense or discussion. Homosexual or bisexual Soviet citizens who wanted a position within the Communist Party were expected to marry a person of the opposite sex, regardless of their actual sexual orientation. A notable example was the Russian film director Sergei Eisenstein, who despite his homosexuality managed to survive by leading a double life, having affairs with men while married to a woman, producing films that were politically pleasing to Stalin.

After Stalin died in 1953, he was replaced by Nikita Khrushchev, who proceeded to liberalise Stalin-era laws regarding marriage, divorce, and abortion, but the anti-gay criminal law remained. The Khrushchev government believed that absent of a criminal law against homosexuality, the sex between men that occurred in the prison environment would spread into the general population as they released many Stalin-era prisoners. Whereas the Stalin government conflated homosexuality with pedophilia, the Khrushchev government conflated homosexuality with the situational, sometimes forced, sex acts between male prisoners.

Although the topic of homosexuality was practically unmentionable, some references to homosexuality could be found in Soviet sex education manuals for young people and their parents. These manuals were published from the early 1950s to the early 1960s in the hope of restricting the sexual activity of Soviet people and to raise their awareness of venereal diseases. These manuals mentioned homosexuality to prevent Soviet children and youth from engaging in it. The first Khrushchev-era sex education manual to mention homosexuality was The Youth Becomes a Man (1960) and described homosexuals as child molesters: "...homosexuals are aroused by and satisfy themselves with adolescents and youngsters, even though the latter have a normal interest towards girls. Homosexuals go all out to gain the affection of the youngsters' society; they buy sweets and cigarettes for youngsters, tickets to the cinema, give them money, help to do home assignments and generally pretend that they unselfishly love youngsters. However, after such preparation, they sooner or later proceed to act. Do not let them touch you! Do not be shy about reporting them to your parents or educators, do not hesitate to report such attempts aimed at you or other young men! Both parents and educators will willingly help: homosexuality is a punishable crime, homosexuals are perfectly aware of that: that is why it is not difficult to get rid of them..".

In the late 1950s some Soviet jurists attempted to decriminalise consensual sodomy. On 23 July 1959, a committee of Soviet jurists convened to discuss and propose changes to the new criminal code of the Russian Soviet Federative Socialist Republic. Two members of the committee proposed to eliminate the law penalising consensual sodomy, yet their proposal was not supported by other members of the committee.

In 1958, the Interior Ministry sent a secret memo to law enforcement ordering them to step up enforcement of the anti-gay criminal law. Despite this, Aline Mosby, a foreign reporter in Russia, attributed in 1962 to the more liberal attitude of the Khrushchev government the fact that she did see some gay couples in public, as well as the fact that seeing men waiting outside of certain theaters looking for dates with male performers was not uncommon in the Soviet Union during the late 1950s and early 1960s.

== Under Brezhnev (1964–1982) ==
Discussions between Soviet legal scholars on the value of the anti-sodomy law continued under Brezhnev. Those legal scholars, who believed that consensual homosexuality should not be a crime, argued that it was a disease, which had to be dealt with by medical knowledge. They also contended that homosexuality was a congenital condition and therefore gay people were not guilty of being different from others. Finally, these scholars argued that investigating sodomy cases, where both partners had consensual sex, was not only pointless, but technically difficult. Other legal scholars, mainly those who worked for the Interior Ministry educational institutions, opposed the idea of decriminalising consensual homosexuality. They criticised their pro-decriminalisation colleagues and argued that such propositions were ill-timed and dangerous, since homosexuality could easily spread if not controlled by the law. Likewise, they believed that homosexuality was inconsistent with the Communist Morality.

Brezhnev-era police often prosecuted homosexuals using concocted evidence and also by the act of intimidating witnesses. If the witnesses were reluctant to testify against the presumed suspect, they could face criminal charges themselves. Once a sodomy case was initiated, pressure from the Party made it impossible to drop and the defendant would most likely end up in jail. Soviet advocates could do very little to help their clients in such cases despite their appeals to the General Procuracy.

Thousands of people were imprisoned for homosexuality and government censorship of homosexuality and gay rights did not begin to relax until the early 1970s, allowing for brief statements. Kozlovsky was permitted to include a brief interior monologue about homosexuality in Moscow to the End of the Line (1973). Perhaps the first public endorsement of gay rights since Stalin was a brief statement, critical of Article 121 and calling for its repeal, made in the Textbook of Soviet Criminal Law (1973).

These references were characterised as being brief statements in a novel or textbook and were made by heterosexuals. Vicktor Sosnora was allowed to write about witnessing an elderly gay actor being brutally murdered in a Leningrad bar in The Flying Dutchman (1979), but the book was only allowed to be published in East Germany. If an author were gay and in particular if they were seen as supporting gay rights, the censors tended to be much harsher.

Russian gay author Yevgeny Kharitonov illegally circulated some gay fiction before he died of heart failure in 1981. Author Gennady Trifonov served four years of hard labour for circulating his gay poems and upon his release was allowed to write and publish only if he avoided depicting or making reference to homosexuality.

Despite sodomy being a punishable crime, the practitioners of new sexological science ("sexopathology"), which emerged in the 1960s, argued that homosexuality should be treated with psychotherapy. They provided such treatment to homosexual men in the privacy of their consultation rooms and went to great lengths to preserve their patients' anonymity. Some of these doctors even went as far as to suggest that the sodomy law should be abolished altogether so that homosexuals could resort to medical help without fear of prosecution. Their calls, however, fell on deaf ears.

In 1960s and 1970s the emerging sexopathology (up to this point concerned with sexual orientation and intersex conditions) encountered its first trans patients seeking sex reassignment surgeries. In 1960s Moscow psychiatrist Aron Isaakovich Belkin met a patient from Tashkent named Rakhim, who desired a sex change to female, while having no intersex conditions. Rakhim was the first patient of Institute of Endocrinology to receive a diagnosis of transsexualism. Belkin didn't permit surgery on his transsexual patients, fearing making irreversible mistakes, but it is known that by 1974 Rakhim had undergone a vaginoplasty and an official name change outside of Moscow.

In 1968 another Soviet doctor, Latvian surgeon Viktors Kalnbērzs met a suicidal patient named Inna, looking for a sex change from female to male. After obtaining verbal consent from Minister of Health of the Latvian Soviet Socialist Republic Vilhelms Kaņeps, Kalnbērzs performed nine operations on the patient, now named Innokenty, over the span of 1970–1972. After that, Minister of Health of the Soviet Union Boris Petrovsky threatened Kalnbērzs with a criminal process and a Gulag sentence, citing Article 108 of the Soviet Criminal Code (premeditated infliction of serious bodily injury). Kalnbērzs was spared this by Kaņeps, but central authorities decided that sex reassignment surgeries were mutilations and unfit to Soviet ideology, silencing Kalnbērzs and regional Ministries of Health from talking and writing about them and carrying them. Despite the order, Kalnbērzs performed several more similar operations.

== Final years (1982–1991) ==
In 1983, following the 1980 adoption of the ICD-9 by the Soviet Union, the Scientific Center for Social and Forensic Psychiatry published a separate edition of the fifth section of the ICD-9 (“Mental disorders”), adapted in accordance with "the theoretical principles of Soviet science". From that moment on, the diagnosis of "transsexualism" officially appeared in Soviet medicine, though instructions for managing patients with such a diagnosis would not appear until 1991, when Aron Belkin and A. S. Karpov published “Transsexualism. Guidelines for gender reassignment”.

In 1983, a group of 30 Russian gay men met and attempted to organise a gay rights organisation under the name «Гей-лаборатория» («Голубая лаборатория») "Gay lab" / ("Blue lab"). At this point, homosexual relations were still punishable by a term of up to five years in prison. The group was put under pressure by the KGB and finally broke up in 1986. Public discussion about re-legalizing private, consensual adult homosexual relations was not permitted until later in the glasnost period.

A poll conducted in 1989 reported that homosexuals were the most hated group in Russian society and that 30 percent of those polled felt that homosexuals should be "liquidated". In a 1991 public opinion poll conducted in Chelyabinsk, 30 percent of the respondents aged 16 to 30 years old felt that homosexuals should be "isolated from society", 5 percent felt they should be "liquidated", 60 percent had a "negative" attitude toward gay people and 5 percent labeled their sexual orientation "unfortunate". From 1989 to 1990, the Moscow gay rights organisation «Ассоциация сексуальных меньшинств» ("Association of Sexual Minorities"), led by Evgenia Debryanskaya, was permitted to exist, with Roman Kalinin given permission to publish a gay newspaper, Tema.

In 1993, after the dissolution of the Soviet Union, Article 121 was removed from the criminal code of Russia, and homosexuality was formally declassified as a mental illness in 1999.

At least 25,688 convictions of men under Article 121 were recorded during the 59 years between 1934 and 1993, but that figure is incomplete because it does not include all jurisdictions, and there are no records for 22 years in which the law was in effect. The highest estimate is 250,000 convictions, but LGBT rights groups in the Russian Federation tend to estimate 60,000 convictions. The first official information was released only in 1988, but it is believed to be about 1,000 convicted a year. According to official data, the number of men convicted under Article 121 had been steadily decreasing during the glasnost period. In 1987, 831 men were sentenced under Article 121; in 1989, 539; in 1990, 497; and in 1991, 462.

== See also ==
- LGBTQ history in Russia
- LGBTQ rights in the post-Soviet states
- Communism and LGBT rights
- The Fall of Communism as Seen in Gay Pornography
