= Muromtsev =

Muromtsev (Russian: Муромцев, from Муромец meaning citizen of Murom) is a Russian masculine surname, its feminine counterpart is Muromtseva. It may refer to

- Sergey Muromtsev (1850–1910), Russian lawyer
  - Muromtsev Dacha, built in 1893 by Sergey Muromtsev
