= LGBTQ history in Russia =

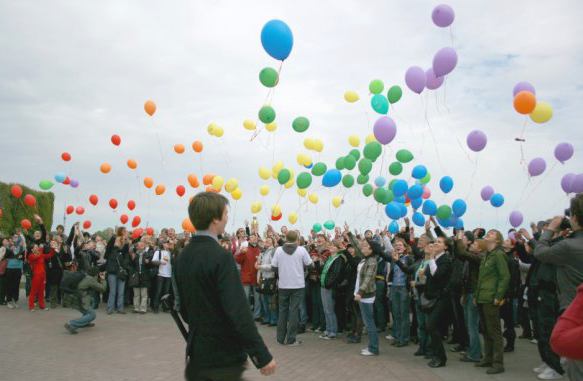
A pro-LGBT rights "Rainbow flash mob" that took place on International Day Against Homophobia and Transphobia in Saint Petersburg, 2009

The history of LGBTQ in Russia and its historical antecedents (the Soviet Union and the Russian Empire) has largely been influenced by the political leanings of its rulers. Medieval Catholic-Protestant Europe had the largest influence on Russian attitude towards homosexuality. Russian LGBT history was influenced by the ambivalent attitude of the Russian Orthodox religiosity regarding sexuality.

Under the reign of Peter the Great in the 18th century, who introduced a wide range of reforms aimed at modernizing and Westernizing Russia, male homosexual activity was banned only for soldiers in military statutes. In 1832, the criminal code included Article 995, which stated that "muzhelozhstvo", or men lying with men, was a criminal act punishable by exile to Siberia for up to five years. Men lying with men was interpreted by courts as meaning anal sex. Application of the laws was rare, and the turn of the century found a relaxation of these laws and a general growing of tolerance and visibility.

In the wake of the October Revolution, the Bolshevik government decriminalized homosexuality. The Bolsheviks rewrote the constitution and "produced two Criminal Codes – in 1922 and 1926 – and an article prohibiting homosexual sex was left off both." The new Communist Party government removed the old laws regarding sexual relations, effectively legalising homosexual activity within Russia, although it remained illegal in other territories of the Soviet Union, and the homosexuals in Russia were still persecuted and sacked from their jobs. Under Joseph Stalin, the Soviet Union recriminalized homosexuality in a decree signed in 1933. The new Article 121, which punished "muzhelozhstvo" with imprisonment for up to five years, saw raids and arrests. Female homosexuals were sent to mental institutions. The decree was part of a broader campaign against "deviant" behavior and "Western degeneracy". Following Stalin's death, there was a liberalisation of attitudes toward sexual issues in the Soviet Union, but homosexual acts remained illegal. Discrimination against LGBT individuals persisted in the Soviet era, and homosexuality was not officially declassified as a mental illness until 1999.

Soviet Article 121 was often commonly used to extend prison sentences and to control dissidents. Among those imprisoned were the well-known film director Sergei Paradjanov and the poet Gennady Trifonov. Under Mikhail Gorbachev's administration in the late 1980s, the first gay organization came into being. The Moscow Gay & Lesbian Alliance was headed by Yevgeniya Debryanskaya and Roman Kalinin, who became the editor of the first officially registered gay newspaper, Tema. The fall of the USSR accelerated the progress of the gay movement in Russia. Gay publications and plays appeared. In 1993, a new Russian Criminal Code was signed, without Article 121. Men who had been imprisoned began to be released.

Since 2000, a campaign by Russian president Vladimir Putin and the Russian Orthodox Church to promote "traditional Russian values" and oppose "liberalism" in regards to homosexuality has led to many pieces of anti-LGBT legislation being passed federally, including the banning of distribution of "propaganda of non-traditional sexual relationships to minors" in 2013, an amendment in Russia's constitution banning same-sex marriage passed in 2020, and expansion of the 2013 propaganda law signed in 2022 to apply it to anyone, regardless of age.

== Muscovite Russia ==
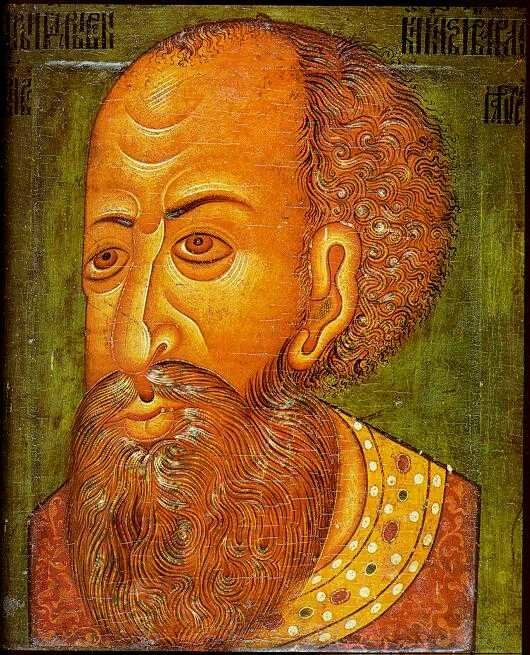
Tsar Ivan the Terrible was accused of having homosexual relations by his political opponents

The Austrian royal councilor Sigismund von Herberstein described in his report Rerum Moscoviticarum Commentarii (Notes on Muscovite Affairs) his observations during his travels in Moscow in 1517 and 1526. He stated that homosexuality was present among all social classes. The English poet George Turberville who visited Moscow in 1568 when Ivan IV ruled Russia during a bloody phase, was not shocked by the carnage, but about the open homosexuality of the Russian peasants. Adam Olearius also reported that homosexuality among men existed on all levels of society and was not treated as a crime. There are also reports of homosexual relationships between women. Testimony of contemporaries in this regard is probably exaggerated, since any tolerant attitude towards homosexuals was equated to sodomy. In 1551, at the ''Stoglaviy sobor'' ("hundred-domed Cathedral"), a real ecclesiastical, but not criminal, punishment for a homosexual act was introduced - excommunication, but the spread of this punishment is doubtful, since the homosexual act was "nothing more than a joke" at the tsar's court and among the people. Ivan the Terrible was accused of being homosexual in an attempt to discredit him. Despite this, there have been outbreaks of homophobia, for example when Tsar False Dmitry I was overthrown, his broken body was dragged through the streets by his genitals alongside his supposed male lover.

== Russian Empire ==
In 1706, under Peter the Great the first homophobic provision appeared, which provided for the death penalty in the army for a homosexual act, but 10 years later the decision was relaxed: corporal punishment was provided for a voluntary sexual act, and exile for rape. Such laws did not apply to civil society until 1832.

In 1832, Tsar Nicholas I added Article 995 which outlawed muzhelozhstvo (archaic Russian term for sodomy). While this could have created a ban on all forms of private adult voluntary homosexual behavior, the courts tended to limit its interpretation to anal sex between men, thus making private acts of oral sex between consenting men legal. The law did not explicitly address female homosexuality or cross-dressing, although both behaviors were considered to be equally immoral and may have been punished under other laws (similar to how the Church would punish girls for being "tomboys") as lesbians were previously punished by law in the 17th century and prior. Those convicted of a voluntary act were sent into exile for 4–5 years, and for a violent act - for 12. However, there were practically no lawsuits, in fact, this law was "dead", the persecution of homosexuals in Russia was less than in the rest of Europe. In the second half of the 19th century and the beginning of the 20th, there was a legal relaxation of penalties for homosexuality.

Author and critic Konstantin Leontiev was bisexual and one of the most famous couples in the late 19th century Russian literary world were the lesbians Anna Yevreinova (a lawyer) and Maria Feodorova (an author). Another notable Russian lesbian couple were poet Polyxena Solovyova and Natalia Manaseina. Other notables included poet Alexei Apukhtin, Pyotr Tchaikovsky, conservative author and publisher Prince Vladimir Meshchersky, Sergei Diaghilev, who had an affair with his cousin Dmitry Filosofov and after the breakup with Vaslav Nijinsky. Mikhail Kuzmin's novel Wings (1906) became one of the first "coming out" stories to have a happy ending and his private journals provide a detailed view of a gay subculture, involving men of all classes.

While there was a degree of government tolerance extended to certain gay or bisexual artists and intellectuals, especially if they were on friendly terms with the Imperial family, the pervasive public opinion, greatly influenced by the Eastern Orthodox Church, was that homosexuality was a sign of corruption, decadence and immorality. Russian author Alexander Amfiteatrov's novel titled People of the 1890s (1910), reflected this prejudice with two gay characters: a masculine lesbian attorney and a decadent gay poet. Leo Tolstoy's Resurrection introduces a Russian artist, convicted for having sex with his students, but given a lenient sentence; and a Russian activist for gay rights as examples of the widespread corruption and immorality in Tsarist Russia.

Russian urbanization had helped to ensure that Saint-Petersburg and Moscow both had gay brothels, along with many public places where men would buy and sell sexual services for or from other men. While there certainly was lesbian prostitution and some alleged lesbian affairs, less was publicly said, good or bad, about gay or bisexual women. Grand Duke Sergei Alexandrovich Romanov (the younger brother and uncle, respectively, of Russian Emperors Alexander III and Nicholas II) served as the governor of Moscow from 1891 to 1905. His homosexual relationships were widely famous in Moscow. In general, the experience of the Russian Empire shows that Russians were often more humane and tolerant of homosexuality than other Europeans. Development of homophobia began later, with the October Revolution and the establishment of Bolshevik power.

=== Anarchists and Kadets ===
Anarchist Alexander Berkman softened his prejudice against homosexuality through his relationship with Emma Goldman and his time spent in jail, where he learned that working-class men could be gay, thus debunking the idea that homosexuality was a sign of upper middle class or wealthy exploitation or decadence.

One of the founders of the Kadets party, Vladimir Dmitrievich Nabokov, had written a research paper on the legal status of homosexuality in Russia, published by early gay rights advocate Dr. Magnus Hirschfeld in Berlin. In addition to the legal research, the paper argued that the anti-gay criminal law should be repealed, making him the first Russian politician to publicly express support for gay rights.

== Soviet Union ==
=== LGBT history after the October Revolution: 1917–1933 ===
The Soviet government of the Russian Soviet Republic (RSFSR) decriminalised homosexuality in December 1917, following the October Revolution and the discarding of the Legal Code of Tsarist Russia.

The legalisation of homosexuality was confirmed in the RSFSR Penal Code of 1922, and following its redrafting in 1926. According to Dan Healey, archival material that became widely available following the collapse of the Soviet Union in 1991 "demonstrates a principled intent to decriminalize the act between consenting adults, expressed from the earliest efforts to write a socialist criminal code in 1918 to the eventual adoption of legislation in 1922."

The legalisation of private, adult and consensual homosexual relations only applied to the Russian SFSR and the Ukrainian SSR. Homosexuality or sodomy remained a crime in the Azerbaijan SSR (officially criminalised in 1923) as well as in the Transcaucasian and Central Asian Soviet Republics throughout the 1920s. Similar criminal laws were enacted in the Uzbek SSR in 1926 and in the Turkmen SSR the following year.

Despite decriminalising homosexuality in 1917, wider Soviet social policy on the matter of wider homosexual rights and the treatment of homosexual people in the 1920s was often mixed. Official Soviet policy in both the RSFSR and the wider USSR in the 1920s on homosexuality fluctuated between toleration and support, attempts at legal equality and social rights for homosexual people, to open examples of state hostility against homosexuals and state attempts to classify homosexuality as "a mental disorder to be cured". In the Communist Party itself during this period of the 1920s, such divergences of opinion and policy on Soviet treatment of homosexuality was also common, ranging from positive, to negative, to ambivalent over views about homosexuals and homosexual rights. Some sections and factions of the Bolshevik government attempted to improve rights and social conditions for homosexuals based on further legal reforms in 1922 and 1923 while others opposed such moves. In the early 1920s, Commissar of Health Nikolai Semashko for example was sympathetic to homosexual emancipation "as part of the [sexual] revolution" and attempted such reforms for homosexual rights in the area of civil and medical areas. According to Wayne R. Dynes, some sections of the Bolsheviks of the 1920s actively considered homosexuality a "[social] illness to be cured" or an example of "bourgeois degeneracy" while other Bolsheviks believed it should be legally/socially tolerated and legally/socially respected in the new socialist society.

The Bolsheviks also rescinded Tsarist legal bans on homosexual civil and political rights, especially in the area of state employment. In 1918, Georgy Chicherin, a homosexual man who kept his homosexuality hidden, was appointed as People's Commissar for Foreign Affairs of the RSFSR. In 1923, Chicherin was also appointed People's Commissar for Foreign Affairs of the USSR, a position he held until 1930.

In the early 1920s, the Soviet government and scientific community took a great deal of interest in sexual research, sexual emancipation and homosexual emancipation. In January 1923, the Soviet Union sent delegates from the Commissariat of Health led by Commissar of Health Semashko to the German Institute for Sexual Research as well as to some international conferences on human sexuality between 1921 and 1930, where they expressed support for the legalisation of adult, private and consensual homosexual relations and the improvement of homosexual rights in all nations. In both 1923 and 1925, Dr. Grigorii Batkis, future director of the Institute for Social Hygiene in Moscow, published a report, The Sexual Revolution in Russia, which stated that homosexuality was "perfectly natural" and should be legally and socially respected. In the Soviet Union itself, the 1920s saw developments in serious Soviet research on sexuality in general, sometimes in support of the progressive idea of homosexuality as a natural part of human sexuality, such as the work of Dr. Batkis prior to 1928. Such delegations and research were sent and authorised and supported by the People's Commissariat for Health under Commissar Semashko.

However, in the late 1920s and early 1930s Soviet policy and attitudes on homosexuality and homosexual rights changed, alongside wider social backlashes against homosexual rights in general in the USSR. Along with increased repression of political dissidents and non-Russian nationalities under Stalin, LGBT themes and issues faced increasing official government censorship and a uniformly harsher policy across the entire Soviet Union. Homosexuality was officially labelled a disease and a mental disorder in the late 1920s (specifically over a period from 1927 to 1930). In this climate, Commissar Semashko reduced his support for homosexual rights and Dr. Batkis and other sexual researchers repudiated (in 1928) their own earlier scientific reports of homosexuality as a natural human sexuality. This followed earlier Soviet tendencies in sections of the medical and health communities, even in the early 1920s, to classify homosexuality, if not as a crime, then as an example of mental or physical illness. Earlier examples of this type of hardening Soviet attitude towards homosexuality include the 1923 report from the People's Commissariat for Health entitled The Sexual Life of Contemporary Youth, authored by Izrail Gel'man, which stated: "Science has now established, with precision that excludes all doubt, that homosexuality is not ill will or crime but sickness. The world of a female or male homosexual is perverted, it is alien to the normal sexual attraction that exists in a normal person". The official stance from the late 1920s could be summarised in an article of the Great Soviet Encyclopedia of 1930 written by medical expert Sereisky (based on a report written in the 1920s):

Soviet legislation does not recognise so-called crimes against morality. Our laws proceed from the principle of protection of society and therefore countenance punishment only in those instances when juveniles and minors are the objects of homosexual interest

—Sereisky, Great Soviet Encyclopedia, 1930, p. 593

=== LGBT history under Stalin: 1933–1953 ===
In 1933, the Soviet government under Stalin recriminalised sex between men. On 7 March 1934, Article 121 was added to the criminal code for the entire Soviet Union that expressly prohibited only male homosexuality, with up to five years of hard labour in prison. There were no criminal statutes regarding sex between women. During the Soviet era, Western observers believed that between 800 and 1,000 men were imprisoned each year under Article 121.

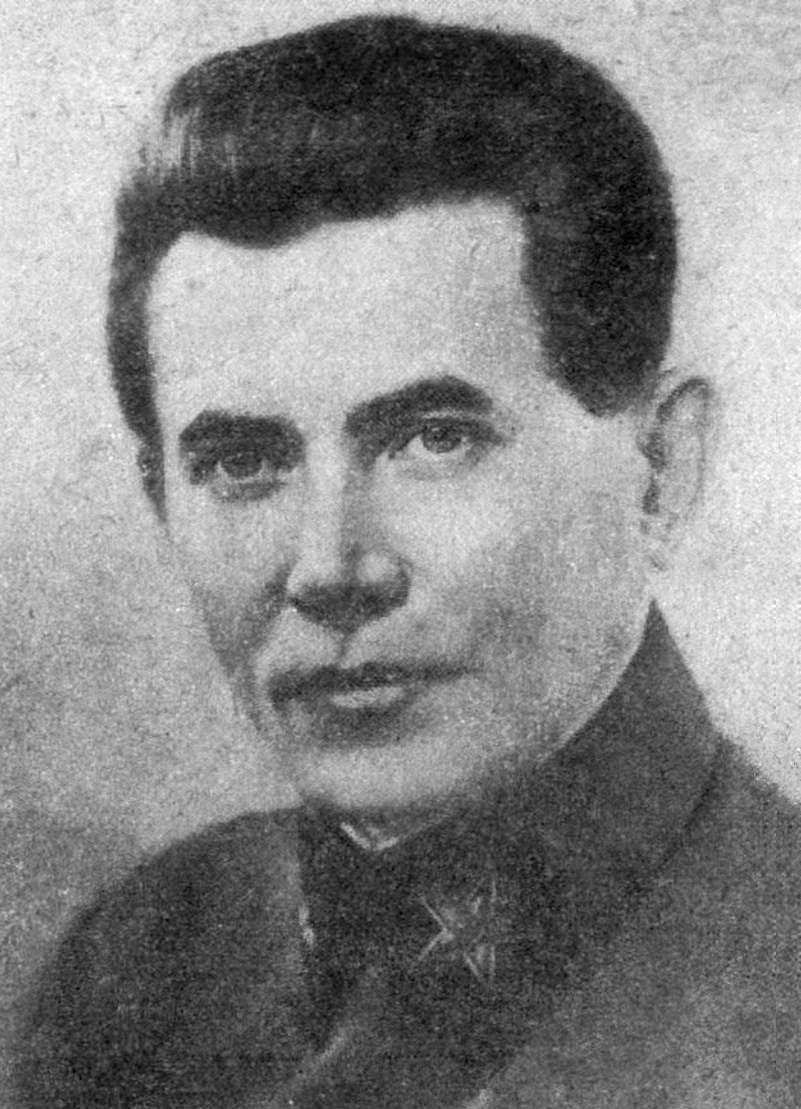
Commissar Ezhov, who confessed to homosexuality before his execution

Some historians have noted that it was during this time that Soviet propaganda began to depict homosexuality as a sign of fascism and that Article 121 may have a simple political tool to use against dissidents, irrespective of their true sexual orientation and to solidify Soviet opposition to Nazi Germany, who had broken its treaty with the USSR. In a famous article in Pravda on 23 May 1934, Maxim Gorky said: "There is already a sarcastic saying: Destroy homosexuality and fascism will disappear."

In 1993, declassified Soviet documents revealed that Stalin had personally demanded the introduction of an anti-gay law, in response to a report from deputy secret police chief Genrikh Yagoda, who had conducted a raid on the residence of hundreds of homosexuals in Moscow and Leningrad in August 1933, about "Pederast activists" engaging in orgies and espionage activities. Beyond expressed fears of a vast "counterrevolutionary fascist homosexual conspiracy", there were several high-profile arrests of Russian men accused of being pederasts. In 1933, 130 men "were accused of being 'pederasts' – adult males who have sex with boys. Since no records of men having sex with boys at that time are available, it is possible this term was used broadly and crudely to label homosexuality". Whatever the precise reason, homosexuality remained a serious criminal offense until it was repealed in 1993.

The Soviet government refrained from publicizing the new law outside of the USSR, and there was little international response. In 1934, the British communist Harry Whyte wrote a long letter to Stalin condemning the law and its prejudicial motivations. He laid out a Marxist position against the oppression of homosexuals as a social minority and compared homophobia to racism, xenophobia and sexism. Stalin did not reply to the letter, but ordered it to be archived, and added a note describing Whyte as "An idiot and a degenerate."

A few years later in 1936, Justice Commissar Nikolai Krylenko publicly stated that the anti-gay criminal law was correctly aimed at the decadent and effete old ruling classes, thus further linking homosexuality to a right-wing conspiracy, i.e. Tsarist aristocracy and German fascists.

On 12 September 1937, Varvara Yakovleva, a bisexual woman who was the RSFSR People's Commissar for Finance, who had previously been in Leon Trotsky's Left Opposition from 1923–1927, and who had been the deputy head of the Petrograd Cheka from 1918–1922, was arrested by the NKVD and taken into custody. Yakovleva was charged with sabotage and terrorism against the Soviet Union, and of membership in a "Trotskyite-fascist diversionary terrorist organization", with interrogators bringing up her past same-sex relationships as "evidence" of her "Trotskyite-fascist tendencies". At a secret trial on 14 May 1938, Yakovleva was convicted of sabotage, terrorism and membership in a "Trotskyite-fascist diversionary terrorist organization", and was sentenced to 20 years in prison. She was held in solitary confinement at Oryol Prison, where she was executed on 11 September 1941 in the Medvedev Forest massacre, together with 156 other inmates. The Medvedev Forest massacre came less than three months after the German invasion of the Soviet Union, and 26 days before Nazi troops invaded Oryol. The Medvedev Forest massacre was one of the many NKVD prisoner massacres committed in 1941.

At the time of Yakovleva's arrest in 1937 and conviction in 1938, the NKVD agency executive was Nikolai Yezhov. It was Yezhov who oversaw the most brutal repressive period of Stalin's Great Purge. Despite this service to Stalin, Yezhov fell from Stalin's favour in 1938 and left his NKVD leader post in November 1938. On 10 April 1939, Yezhov himself was arrested by the NKVD, which was now run by Lavrentiy Beria, with Yezhov taken into custody. Yezhov stated during his interrogation that he had many lovers, including Filipp Goloshchyokin, the then party functionary in Kazakh ASSR, during the latter half of 1925, and that they had shared an apartment in Kyzylorda. On 4 February 1940, Yezhov was shot in the basement of a small NKVD station on Varsonofevskii Lane (Varsonofyevskiy pereulok) in Moscow. The basement had a wall made of logs and a sloping floor so that it could be hosed down after executions, and had been built according to Yezhov's own specifications near the Lubyanka. The main NKVD execution chamber in the basement of the Lubyanka was deliberately avoided to ensure total secrecy.

=== LGBT history post-Stalin: 1953–1991 ===
When Stalin came to power, homosexuality became a topic unfit for public depiction, defense or discussion. Homosexual or bisexual Soviet citizens who wanted a position within the Communist Party were expected to marry a person of the opposite sex, regardless of their actual sexual orientation. A notable example was the Russian film director Sergei Eisenstein, who despite his homosexuality managed to survive by leading a double life, having affairs with men while married to a woman, producing films that were politically pleasing to Stalin.

After Stalin died in 1953, he was replaced by Nikita Khrushchev, who proceeded to liberalize the Stalin era laws regarding marriage, divorce and abortion, but the anti-gay criminal law remained. The Khrushchev government believed that absent of a criminal law against homosexuality, the sex between men that occurred in the prison environment would spread into the general population as they released many Stalin-era prisoners. Whereas the Stalin government conflated homosexuality with pedophilia, the Khrushchev government conflated homosexuality with the situational, sometimes forced, sex acts between male prisoners.

Although the topic of homosexuality was practically unmentionable, some references to homosexuality could be found in Soviet sex education manuals for young people and their parents. These manuals were published from the early 1950s to the early 1960s in the hope of restricting the sexual activity of Soviet people and to raise their awareness of venereal diseases. These manuals mentioned homosexuality to prevent Soviet children and youth from engaging in it. The first Khrushchev-era sex education manual to mention homosexuality was The Youth Becomes a Man (1960) and described homosexuals as child molesters: "...homosexuals are aroused by and satisfy themselves with adolescents and youngsters, even though the latter have a normal interest towards girls. Homosexuals go all out to gain the affection of the youngsters' society; they buy sweets and cigarettes for youngsters, tickets to the cinema, give them money, help to do home assignments and generally pretend that they unselfishly love youngsters. However, after such preparation, they sooner or later proceed to act. Do not let them touch you! Do not be shy about reporting them to your parents or educators, do not hesitate to report such attempts aimed at you or other young men! Both parents and educators will willingly help: homosexuality is a punishable crime, homosexuals are perfectly aware of that: that is why it is not difficult to get rid of them..".

=== LGBT history under Brezhnev ===
In 1958, the Interior Ministry sent a secret memo to law enforcement ordering them to step up enforcement of the anti-gay criminal law. Yet during the late 1950s and early 1960s, Aline Mosby, a foreign reporter in Russia at the time, attributed to the more liberal attitude of the Khrushchev government to the fact that she did see some gay couples in public and that it was not uncommon to see men waiting outside of certain theaters looking for dates with male performers.

In the late 1950s some Soviet jurists attempted to decriminalise consensual sodomy. On 23 July 1959 a committee of Soviet jurists convened to discuss and propose changes to the new RSFSR republican criminal code. Two members of the committee proposed to eliminate the law penalising consensual sodomy, yet their proposal was not supported by other members of the committee.

Discussions between Soviet legal scholars on the value of the anti-sodomy law continued under Brezhnev. Those legal scholars, who believed that consensual homosexuality should not be a crime, argued that it was a disease, which had to be dealt with by medical knowledge. They also contended that homosexuality was a congenital condition and therefore gay people were not guilty of being different from others. Finally, these scholars argued that investigating sodomy cases, where both partners had consensual sex, was not only pointless, but technically difficult. Other legal scholars, mainly those who worked for the Interior Ministry educational institutions, opposed the idea of decriminalising consensual homosexuality. They criticised their pro-decriminalisation colleagues and argued that such propositions were ill-timed and dangerous, since homosexuality could easily spread if not controlled by the law. Likewise, they believed that homosexuality was inconsistent with the Communist Morality.

Brezhnev-era police often prosecuted homosexuals using concocted evidence and intimidating witnesses. If the witnesses were reluctant to testify against the presumed suspect, they could face criminal charges themselves. Once a sodomy case was initiated, pressure from the Party made it impossible to drop and the defendant would most likely end up in jail. Soviet advocates could do very little to help their clients in such cases despite their appeals to the General Procuracy.

Thousands of people were imprisoned for homosexuality and government censorship of homosexuality and gay rights did not begin to slowly relax until the early 1970s, allowing for brief statements. Kozlovsky was permitted to include a brief interior monologue about homosexuality in Moscow to the End of the Line (1973). Perhaps the first public endorsement of gay rights since Stalin was a brief statement, critical of Article 121 and calling for its repeal, made in the Textbook of Soviet Criminal Law (1973).

These references were characterized as being brief statements in a novel or textbook and were made by heterosexuals. Vicktor Sosnora was allowed to write about witnessing an elderly gay actor being brutally murdered in a Leningrad bar in The Flying Dutchman (1979), but the book was only allowed to be published in East Germany. When the author was gay and in particular if they were seen as supporting gay rights, the censors tended to be much harsher.

Russian gay author Yevgeny Kharitonov illegally circulated some gay fiction before he died of heart failure in 1981. Author Gennady Trifonov served four years of hard labour for circulating his gay poems and upon his release was allowed to write and publish only if he avoided depicting or making reference to homosexuality.

Despite sodomy being a punishable crime, the practitioners of new sexological science ("sexopathology"), which emerged in the 1960s, argued that homosexuality should be treated with psychotherapy. They provided such treatment to homosexual men in the privacy of their consultation rooms and went to great lengths to preserve their patients' anonymity. Some of these doctors even went as far as to suggest that the sodomy law should be abolished altogether so that homosexuals could resort to medical help without fear of prosecution. Their calls, however, fell on deaf ears.

In 1960s and 1970s the emerging sexopathology (up to this point concerned with sexual orientation and intersex conditions) encountered its first trans patients seeking sex reassignment surgeries. In 1960s Moscow psychiatrist Aron Isaakovich Belkin met a patient from Tashkent named Rakhim, who desired a sex change to female, while having no intersex conditions. Rakhim was the first patient of Institute of Endocrinology to receive a diagnosis of transsexualism. Belkin didn't permit surgery on his transsexual patients, fearing making irreversible mistakes, but it is known that by 1974 Rakhim had undergone a vaginoplasty and an official name change outside of Moscow.

In 1968 another Soviet doctor, Latvian surgeon Viktors Kalnbērzs met a suicidal patient named Inna, looking for a sex change to male. After obtaining verbal consent from Minister of Health of the Latvian SSR Vilhelms Kaņeps, Kalnbērzs performed nine operations on the patient, now named Innokenty, over the span of 1970–1972. After that, USSR Minister of Health Boris Petrovsky threatened Kalnbērzs with a criminal process and a Gulag sentence, citing Article 108 of the Soviet Criminal Code (premeditated infliction of serious bodily injury). Kalnbērzs was spared this by Kaņeps, but central USSR authorities decided that sex reassignment surgeries were mutilations and unfit to Soviet ideology, silencing Kalnbērzs and regional Ministries of Health from talking and writing about them and carrying them. Despite the order, Kalnbērzs performed several more similar operations.

In 1980, the USSR adopted the ICD 9. In 1983, the Scientific Center for Social and Forensic Psychiatry published a separate edition of the fifth section of the ICD-9 (“Mental disorders”), adapted in accordance with "the theoretical principles of Soviet science". From that moment on, the diagnosis of "transsexualism" officially appeared in Soviet medicine, however, first instructions for managing patients with such a diagnosis appeared only in 1991, when Aron Belkin and A. S. Karpov published “Transsexualism. Guidelines for gender reassignment”.

In 1983, a group of 30 Russian gay men met and attempted to organize a gay rights organization under the name «Гей-лаборатория» («Голубая лаборатория») "Gay lab" / ("Blue lab"). At this point, homosexual relations were still punishable by a term of up to five years in prison. The group was put under pressure by the KGB and finally broke up in 1986. It was not until later in the glasnost period that public discussion was permitted about re-legalizing private, consensual adult homosexual relations.

A poll conducted in 1989 reported that homosexuals were the most hated group in Russian society and that 30 percent of those polled felt that homosexuals should be liquidated. In a 1991 public opinion poll conducted in Chelyabinsk, 30 percent of the respondents aged 16 to 30 years old felt that homosexuals should be "isolated from society", 5 percent felt they should be "liquidated", 60 percent had a "negative" attitude toward gay people and 5 percent labeled their sexual orientation "unfortunate". In 1989–1990, the Moscow gay rights organization «Ассоциация сексуальных меньшинств» ("Association of Sexual Minorities") led by Evgenia Debryanskaya was permitted to exist, with Roman Kalinin given permission to publish a gay newspaper, Tema.

In 1993, after the collapse of the USSR, Article 121 was finally removed from the RSFSR Penal Code.

There were at least 25,688 recorded convictions of men under Article 121 during the 59 years between 1934 and 1993, but that figure is incomplete because it does not include all jurisdictions, and there are no records for 22 years in which the law was in effect. The highest estimate is 250,000 convictions, but LGBT rights groups in the Russian Federation tend to estimate 60,000 convictions. The first official information was released only in 1988, but it is believed to be about 1,000 convicted a year. According to official data, the number of men convicted under Article 121 had been steadily decreasing during the glasnost period. In 1987, 831 men were sentenced under Article 121; in 1989, 539; in 1990, 497; and in 1991, 462.

== Russian Federation ==
=== LGBT history under Yeltsin: 1991–1999 ===
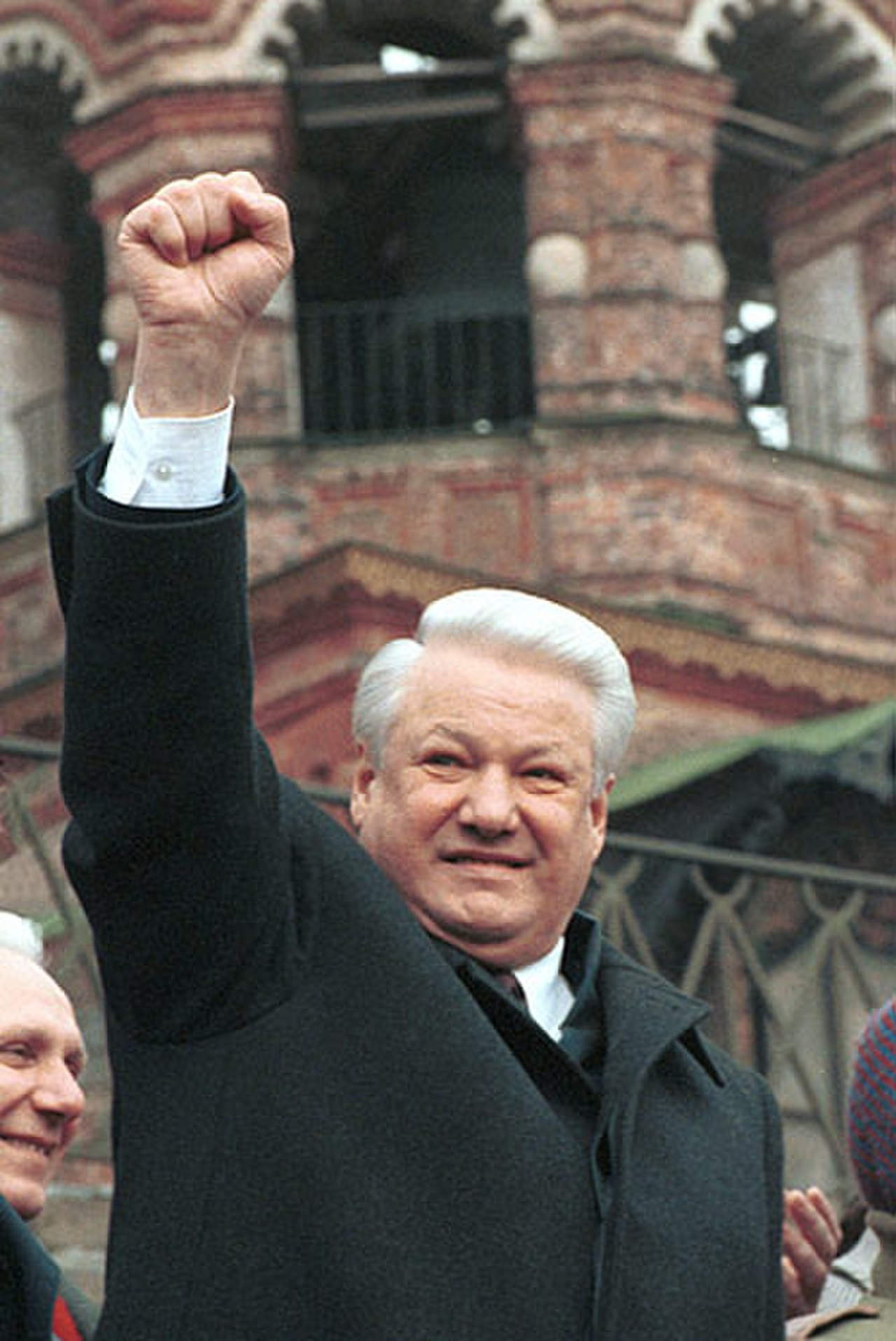
In 1993, President Boris Yeltsin signed a law decriminalizing homosexual acts in Russia

The International Gay and Lesbian Symposium and Film Festival took place in Moscow and Leningrad (now Saint Petersburg) from 23 July to 2 August 1991.

On 27 May 1993, homosexual acts between consenting males were legalised. However, there have been reports that by 13 August 1993 "not all persons serving sentences under the old legislation have been released from jail" and there have been "cases of homosexuals being re-sentenced and kept in jail, cases of imprisoned homosexuals who cannot be located and of missing files". The reform was largely the result of pressure from the Council of Europe. While President Boris Yeltsin signed the bill into law on 29 April 1993, neither he nor the parliament had any interest in LGBT rights legislation.

Two openly gay candidates ran for election in 2016; no openly LGBT Russian has been elected to the parliament.

In 1996, a Russian LGBT human rights organization called Triangle was formed, with several new LGBT themed publications and local organizations arising in light of the fall of the Soviet Union. Yet as was the case with the groups that arose during 1989–1990, many of these organizations, including Triangle, folded due to lack of funding as well as legal and social harassment.

=== LGBT history under Putin: 1999–present ===
==== 1999–2013 ====
In 1999, homosexuality was formally removed from the list of Russian mental disorders (due to endorsing ICD-10, which removed homosexuality in 1990).

In 2002, Gennady Raikov, who led a conservative pro-government group in the Russian Duma, suggested outlawing homosexual acts. His proposal failed to generate enough votes, but the suggestion generated public support from many conservative religious leaders and medical doctors.

In 2003, a new statute about military and medical expertise was adopted (1 July 2003) and it contained a clause of "deviations of gender identification and sexual preferences" among the reasons of disability for military service [...] this clause irritated the proponents of having equal rights for people of different sexual orientation [...] [while] another clause said that different sexual orientation should not be considered a deviation". Finally, Valery Kulikov, the Major-General of the Medical Service, announced:

The new statute about military and medical expertise from 1 July 2003 does not forbid people of non-standard sexual orientation from serving in the military.... The issue of person's homosexuality is not medical. There is no such diagnosis as homosexuality in medicine. There is no such illness in the classification of World Health Organization. The new statute about military and medical expertise follows international law practice. Therefore the reasons for evaluating the ability to serve for homosexuals are the same: physical and psychic health.

People of non-standard sexual orientation can have problems when being in the Army, and therefore should not reveal their sexual preferences, Valery Kulikov said: "Other soldiers are not going to like that, they can be beaten".

In May 2005, LGBT human rights project Gayrussia.ru was founded by Nikolai Alekseev to fight discriminations on the basis of sexual orientation and raise awareness of LGBT issues in Russia. In July 2005, Alekseev launched the Moscow Pride initiative which has been organized every year since May 2006. As of July 2009, Gayrussia.ru is a transnational organization promoting LGBT rights in Russia and Belarus.

In 2006, Grand Mufti Talgat Tadzhuddin was quoted as saying about Moscow Pride marchers: "If they come out on to the streets anyway they should be flogged. Any normal person would do that – Muslims and Orthodox Christians alike". Similar comments were made by one of Russia's Chief Rabbis, Berl Lazar, who joined Tadzhuddin in condemning the march, saying that it "would be a blow for morality".

Russian LGBT network was founded in May 2006. As of July 2009, this was the first and only interregional LGBT organization in Russia.

In late April and early May 2006, protesters blockaded some popular gay clubs in Moscow. After initial complaints that police had failed to intervene, later blockade attempts were met with arrests.

In May 2006, a gay rights forum was held in Moscow. An accompanying march was banned by the mayor in a decision upheld by the courts. Some activists, head of them Nikolai Alekseev, tried to march despite the ban and attempted to lay flowers at the Tomb of the Unknown Soldier. This march is known as the first Moscow Pride. This act and the presence of non-Russian activists aroused a nationalist reaction in addition to a religious condemnation of homosexuality, leading to the presence of both nationalist groups and Orthodox protesters threatening the gay activists. Anti-march protesters beat the marchers and about 50 marchers and 20 protesters were arrested when riot police moved in to break up the conflict. The documentary Moscow Pride '06 featured the events that took place from 25 to 27 May that year in Moscow. It contains a vivid testimony of the first attempt to stage a gay pride march in Russia as well as the festival organized around it.

Also in May 2006, the Ryazan Region became the first region in Russia to ban "propaganda of homosexuality" in an amendment to local Article 3.10, entitled, "public acts aimed at the propaganda of homosexualism (sodomy and lesbianism) among minors."

With regards to what the heads of regions say, I normally try not to comment. I don't think it is my business. My relation to gay parades and sexual minorities in general is simple – it is connected with my official duties and the fact that one of the country's main problems is demographic. But I respect and will continue to respect personal freedom in all its forms, in all its manifestations.

— President Vladimir Putin, when quizzed on the ban of the Moscow Pride Parade, 1 February 2007

On 27 May 2007, Moscow Pride was banned again by the former Moscow Mayor Yuri Luzhkov, who had earlier branded it as "satanic", was held in Moscow again and for the second year running degenerated into violent clashes with anti-gay protestors. For the second time, police failed to protect gay rights activists. Italian MP Marco Cappato was kicked by an anti-gay activist and then detained when he demanded police protection. British gay rights veteran Peter Tatchell and Russian gay leader Nikolai Alekseev were detained as well. The march is documented in the 2008 film East/West - Sex & Politics.

On 1 June 2008, Moscow Pride again attempted to hold a gay parade. Some 13 Orthodox opposers were held by police for violent actions against protesters.

In February 2009 at the final press conference in Moscow, the Russian LGBT Network and the Moscow Helsinki Group published a paper titled "The Situation of Lesbian, Gay, Bisexual and Transgender People in Russian Federation". This is the first complex study of the legal situation of LGBT people in the history of Russia. The 100-page paper contained the analysis of relevant Russian laws and also assembles and generalizes specific instances of infringement of rights and discrimination.

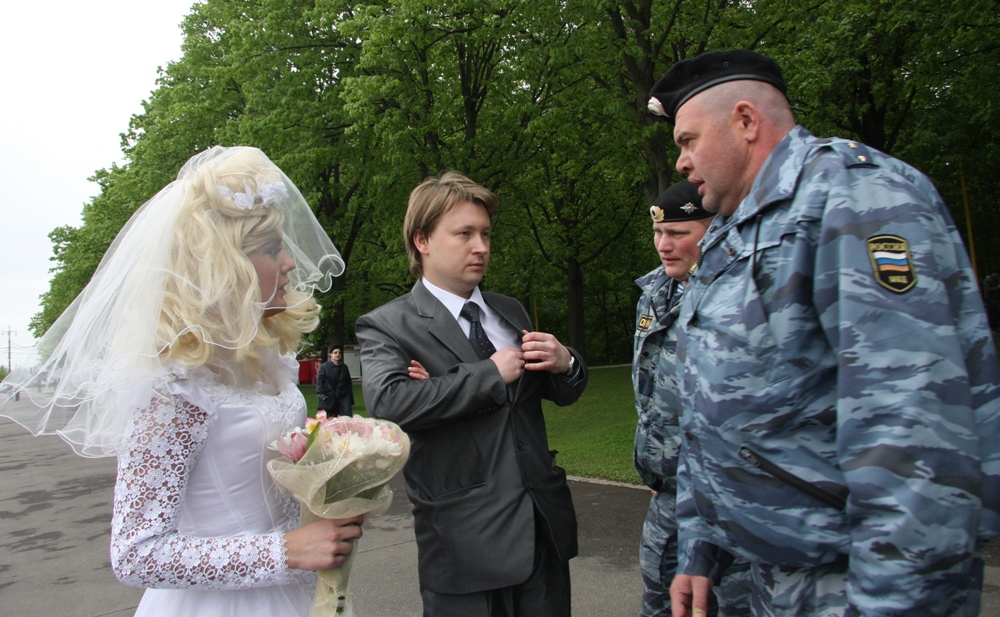
Nikolai Alekseev at the Slavic Pride festival on 16 May 2009—two anti-riot police stopped Alekseev and his partner, a transgender activist from Belarus

On 8 May, Russian Duma rejected a bill criminalizing gay "propaganda" in Russia (with only 90 votes in favor against 226 minimum required). This bill was initiated in 2007 by a Fair Russia party member and suggested depriving those who "openly demonstrated a homosexual way of life and a homosexual orientation" of the right to hold posts in educational establishments or in the army for a term from 2 to 5 years. According to Interfax, the parliamentarians decided that gay "propaganda" was not dangerous for society and thus could not be punished under the criminal code. Nikolai Alekseev, Chief organizer of the Moscow Pride, commented that with parliament rejecting this bill, it is likely that the Constitutional Court of Russia follows Moscow Pride's request to cancel a similar law that is in force in the Ryazan Region.

On 16 May, the Moscow Pride timed to coincide with Moscow's hosting of the 2009 Eurovision song contest finals was broken up by police, with all 30 participants – including British human rights activist Peter Tatchell – arrested.

On 17 May, for the International Day Against Homophobia Russian LGBT network organized the Rainbow Flash Mob in Saint Petersburg; this event brought together from 100 to 250 people by various estimations and the organizers consider it to be the most large-scale action in the whole history of Russia dedicated to the problem of LGBT rights. The action in smaller scales has also passed in more than 30 cities of Russia.

In 2010, Russia was fined by the European Court of Human Rights under allegations by Nikolay Alexeyev that cities were discriminating against gays by refusing to approve pride parades. Although they claimed a risk of violence, the court ruled that their decision "effectively approved of and supported groups who had called for [their] disruption". He considered the ruling to be a "crippling blow to Russian homophobia on all accounts".

In 2011, the Arkhangelsk Oblast and Kostroma Oblast legislatures followed the Ryazan Region, passing laws banning "propaganda of homosexuality." In March 2012, the St. Petersburg Duma also passed a law prohibiting "public acts aimed at the propaganda of sodomy, lesbianism, bisexuality, and transgenderism among minors." By the end of 2012, the regions of Magadan, Novosibirsk, Samara, and Krasnodar all had bans on the "propaganda of homosexuality."

Also in 2011, Moscow's mayor Sergey Sobyanin blocked Nikolay Alexeyev's request for permission to organize Moscow Pride in the city for the next 100 years. In August 2012, contravening the previous European Court of Human Rights ruling, Moscow upheld Sobyanin's ruling, citing the possibility of public disorder.

In March 2012, an attempt to organize a Pride House at the 2014 Winter Olympics was struck down by the Ministry of Justice, which refused to approve the registration of the NGO set up to run it on the basis of the Pride House inciting "propaganda of non-traditional sexual orientation which can undermine the security of the Russian society and the state, provoke social-religious hatred, which is the feature of the extremist character of the activity".

==== 2013–present ====
In June 2013, Russia passed a federal law banning the distribution of "propaganda of non-traditional sexual relationships" to minors. Article 6.21 of the Code of the Russian Federation on Administrative Offenses was approved by the State Duma in a 436–0 vote prior to being signed in by Vladimir Putin. Putin's justifications for it are to promote "traditional Russian values" in opposition of Western state liberalism in regards to homosexuality, "protect the children" and to boost Russia's falling birthrate. Much of the support for the "propaganda" law comes from the Russian Orthodox Church and other conservative groups. This support is so intense that the only Parliament member to abstain was one Ilya Ponomarev, who has history of supporting pro-LGBT protests. Earlier, the Duma's final vote had been 388–1–1. This level of state support reflects the opinions of the general Russian population: polls conducted by the Levada Center indicate that nearly two-thirds of Russians consider "morally unacceptable and worth condemning". The same research indicates that half of Russians are against gay rallies and same-sex marriage and approximately a third of them think homosexuality results from "a sickness or a psychological trauma". Vitaly Milonov, a heavily conservative Russian Orthodox politician who was and is one of the main driving forces behind Russian anti-LGBT legislation, claimed that "only a man and a woman can be a family" and that the "propaganda" covered by the law is "dangerous" as "children are very vulnerable to manipulation" and could be led to believe that "only homosexuals experience true feelings".

Article 6.21 of the Code of the Russian Federation on Administrative Offenses deems the following as a punishable offense: "Propaganda of non-traditional sexual relations among minors, manifested in the distribution of information aimed at forming non-traditional sexual orientations, the attraction of non-traditional sexual relations, distorted conceptions of the social equality of traditional and non-traditional sexual relations among minors, or imposing information on non-traditional sexual relations which evoke interest in these kinds of relations".

Distributing any such "propaganda" is punishable by fining: 4,000 to 5,000 rubles for individuals (about $120–$150 U.S. dollars) and up to 800,000 to 1 million rubles (about $24,000–$30,000 U.S. dollars) for corporations and other legal entities. Foreigners are also subject to Article 6.21 and violation results in up to fifteen days of incarceration and/or deportation. Such strict enforcement has been heavily criticized due to Article 6.21's vague wording as prior its officiation the law's wording was changed from addressing "homosexual propaganda" to "propaganda of nontraditional sexual relations", which is nebulous enough to leave the definition up to police and courts to interpret when detaining LGBT activists. It has also been noted that the wording essentially equates homosexuality with paedophelia as the latter also falls under the "nontraditional sexual relations" category. Despite such criticisms, President Putin has stated that "homosexuals are equal citizens enjoying full rights" and Prime Minister Dmitri Medvedev has said that he "[believes] that only a negligible part of the Russian population is actually concerned about [the new law]".

Following Article 6.21's passage, there has been an increase in violence and harassment towards LGBT individuals in Russia. People have been subject to smear campaigns from homophobic civilians and administrative fines, some even had to resign from their jobs to lessen the load. Two vigilante groups in particular have been conducting extensive anti-LGBT campaigns, infringing the privacy of thousands of Russian youth: Occupy Gerontophilia, which targets gay teenagers; and Occupy Paedophilia, which focuses on gay adults (equating homosexuality with pedophilia all the while). These groups often operate by "ambushing" LGBT adults and youth by contacting them online and attempt to convince them to come to allegedly gay-friendly meetings. Once the victims arrive, they are viciously harassed and humiliated on-camera. Occupy Gerontophilia posted dozens of videos to the social network VKontakte before it was shut down for infringing the privacy of minors—but not before the organizations page got 170,000 subscribers. Occupy Gerontophilia and Occupy Paedophilia are not the only ones hostile towards the LGBT community: in May 2013, a 23-year-old man was brutally beaten and killed in the city of Volgograd not long after the "propaganda" law's passage, all because he had admitted his status as a gay man to his friends. Despite the severe situation, Russian law "[does] not outlaw discrimination based on sexual orientation", leaving millions of people without any kind of widespread protection. Though Maxim Martsinkevich, the founder of Occupy Paedophilia, was arrested and convicted on charges of "inciting and fomenting cases of extremism", in his videos and postings on VKontakte the prosecution did not actually include any of his homophobic videos or statements as evidence in its case against Martsinkevich.

The sole public support and safe space for LGBT youth is a group called Deti-404 (Children-404), founded by LGBT activist Lena Klimova, which has active pages on Facebook and VKontakte. On Deti-404, LGBT youth can share and discuss their experiences in their country's hostile environment. However, the group has already faced bureaucratic violence from the Russian government. On 31 January 2014, Klimova was charged for the "promotion of nontraditional sexual relations to minors" under the new law, potentially facing a fine of up to 100,000 rubles ($2,800). The case against Klimova was eventually dismissed due to "absence of an administrative offence", but Christian conservative politician Vitaly Milonov, who was the one to originally urge the case, has stated his intention to appeal.

Since before Article 6.21's passage, the number of Russian asylum seekers has been dramatically increasing and since the law's passage that number has increased still more. It has been speculated that the greater number of asylum seekers is due to the aforementioned rise in anti-LGBT harassment and violence. Even in 2012, in the time leading up to Article 6.21's passage the advocacy group Immigration Equality stated that had it won more gay and lesbian asylum cases for Russians than from any other country other than Jamaica in the previous two years. By 2013, the United States had received 837 new asylum applications from Russian nationals and in 2014 this number rose to 969 new applications. According to Immigration Equality, the majority of the inquiries come from young (under the age of 30) Russians who fear being harassed, beaten, or even killed by homophobic groups like Occupy Paedophilia. Spectrum Human Rights, a Virginia-based advocacy group, has received double the amount of enquiries from the Russian LGBT community since last year.

As the situation has worsened, protests from the LGBT community have continued despite the fact that President Putin has passed a law outlawing repeated street protests. Notably, the Russian LGBT Network has "53 events to spread information about LGBT rights and problems, 144 events for the members of LGBT community, [and] 33 street actions and 21 advocacy events" on record for 2014. However, participants in pro-LGBT events have faced heavy opposition. In October 2013, a pro-LGBT rally meant to observe National Coming Out Day in Saint Petersburg consisting of roughly 15 people had been accosted and harassed by about 200 conservative and religious protestors. The situation escalated to violence after one of the religious protesters tore a rainbow flag out of a woman's hands—at which point the police, which remained passive up to this point, arrested 67 people on both sides.

State persecution of and harsh tactics against the LGBT community increased in 2022 during the Russian invasion of Ukraine. In July 2023 President Putin signed legislation banning gender affirming surgeries, after the act unanimously passed both houses of parliament. In November 2023, a Russian court designated what it called "the international LGBT public movement" as an "extremist organization", which would ban its activities across Russia.

== See also ==
- LGBT rights in Asia
- LGBT rights in Europe
- LGBT rights in Russia
- Russian gay propaganda law
- LGBT rights protests surrounding the 2014 Winter Olympics
- The Fall of Communism as Seen in Gay Pornography
