= William E. Jones (filmmaker) =

American artist

William E. Jones (born 1962) is an American experimental filmmaker, artist and writer based in Los Angeles known for his work with found footage. In recent years he has turned to painting.

== Early life ==
Raised in Massillon, Ohio, William is a graduate of Yale University.

== Selected filmography ==
- Massillon (1991)
- The Fall of Communism as Seen in Gay Pornography (1998)
- Film Montages (for Peter Roehr) (2006)
- V.O. (2006)
- Bay of Pigs (2012)
- Shoot Don't Shoot (2012)
- Actual T.V. Picture (2013)
- Psychic Driving (2014)
- Rejected (2017)
