= Venedikt Yerofeyev =

Russian writer and Soviet dissident

- Венедикт Ерофеев
- Born: Venedikt Vasilyevich Yerofeyev; October 24, 1938; Niva-3 settlement, suburb of Kandalaksha, Murmansk Oblast, Russian SFSR, Soviet Union
- Died: May 11, 1990 (aged 51); Moscow, Soviet Union
- Resting place: Kuntsevo Cemetery
- Occupation: Writer
- Spouse(s): Valentina Vasilevna Zimakova, Galina Pavlovna Nosova
- Children: Venedikt Venediktovich Yerofeyev
- Writing career
- Period: Contemporary
- Genres: Novel; prose poetry; satire; play; fictional diary; diary
- Notable work: Moscow-Petushki
- Literary movement: Soviet nonconformism; Surrealism; Russian postmodernism

Venedikt Vasilyevich Yerofeyev, also Benedict Erofeev or Erofeyev (Russian: Венеди́кт Васи́льевич Ерофе́ев; 24 October 1938 in Niva-3 settlement, suburb of Kandalaksha – 11 May 1990 in Moscow) was a Russian writer and Soviet dissident.

== Biography ==
Yerofeyev was born in the maternity hospital of Niva-3 by Kandalaksha, Murmansk Oblast, a settlement of "special settlers" employed in the construction of a hydroelectric power station Niva GES-3 on the Niva River (now Niva-3 is a microdistrict of Kandalaksha). The record made in his birth certificate declares his birthplace to be his parents' place of residence: Chupa railway station, Loukhsky District, Karelian ASSR.

His father was imprisoned during Great Purge but survived 6 years in the gulags. Most of Yerofeyev's childhood was spent in Kirovsk, Murmansk Oblast. He managed to enter the philology department of the Moscow State University but was expelled from the university after a year and a half because he did not attend compulsory military training. Later he studied in several more institutes in different towns, including Kolomna and Vladimir, but he never managed to graduate from any, usually being expelled due to his "amoral behaviour".

Between 1958 and 1975, Yerofeyev lived without propiska in various towns in Russia, Ukraine, Belarus, and Lithuania, also spending some time in Uzbekistan and Tajikistan, doing different low-level and underpaid jobs; for a time he lived and worked in the Muromtsev Dacha in Moscow. He started writing at the age of 17; in the 1960s he unsuccessfully submitted several articles on Ibsen and Hamsun to literary magazines.

== Literary legacy ==
Yerofeyev is best known for his 1969 "poem in prose" (ironical assignment of the genre) Moscow-Petushki (several English translations exist, including Moscow to the End of the Line, Moscow Circles, and Moscow Stations). It is an account of a journey from Moscow to Petushki (Vladimir Oblast) by electric train, one of many futile attempts to visit his small son: each time such a journey becomes soaked in alcohol and fails. During the trip, the hero becomes involved in philosophical discussions about drinking, recounts some of the fantastic escapades he participated in, including declaring war on Norway, charting the drinking statistics of his colleagues when leader of a cable-laying crew, and obsessing about the woman he loves.

Referred to by David Remnick as "the comic high-water mark of the Brezhnev era", the poem was published for the first time in 1973 in a Russian-language magazine in Jerusalem. It was not published in the Soviet Union until 1989.

Of note is his smaller 1988 work My Little Leniniana (Моя маленькая лениниана, Moya malenkaya Leniniana), which is a collection of quotations from Lenin's works and letters, which shows the unpleasant parts of the character of the "leader of the proletariat". Alexander Bondarev tells the story of its origin.

Yerofeyev also claimed to have written in 1972 a novel Shostakovich about the famous Russian composer Dmitri Shostakovich, but the manuscript was allegedly stolen in a train. The novel has never been found. Before his death of throat cancer Yerofeyev finished a play called Walpurgisnacht, or the Steps of the Commander ("Вальпургиева ночь или Шаги командора") and was working on another play about Fanny Kaplan.

== Personal life and death ==
Venedikt Yerofeyev was married twice: firstly to Valentina Vasilevna Zimakova and then Galina Pavlovna Nosova.

In 1966 Yerofeyev's wife, Valentina Zimakova gave birth to a son - Venedikt Venediktovich Yerofeyev. Galina Nosova died three years after Yerofeyev - having thrown herself off the balcony of her 13th floor apartment in Moscow.

In 1985 Yerofeyev was diagnosed with throat cancer. Doctors operated on him, after which he could only speak using an Electrolarynx. A film was made about Moskva-Petushki in the last years of Yerofeyev's life and he can be seen speaking with the help of this apparatus. In his last years he divided his time between Moscow and Abramtsevo in Moscow Oblast.

Yerofeyev died five years after he was first diagnosed with the disease, on 11 May 1990, at the Russian Oncological Centre in Moscow. He is buried in Kuntsevo Cemetery.

== Works ==
- Moscow-Petushki (1969)
- My Little Leniniana (1988)
- Walpurgisnacht (1990)
