= The Fall of Communism as Seen in Gay Pornography =

1998 documentary film

- Directed by: William E. Jones
- Release date: 1998
- Running time: 19 minutes
- Country: United States
- Language: English

The Fall of Communism as Seen in Gay Pornography is a 1998 American short documentary film by William E. Jones. The film covers the gay pornography industry in the former Eastern Bloc between 1993 and 1998, when Western pornographic filmmakers began to expand into post-communist countries such as the Czech Republic, Bulgaria, Hungary, and Russia to film young men in need of money due to the mass unemployment and economic insecurity following the dissolution of the Soviet Union and the fall of communism. The film portrays this period in gay pornography through the lens of economic exploitation for the benefit of Western audiences.

== Content ==
William E. Jones said that the development of The Fall of Communism as Seen in Gay Pornography was a "product of severe material constraints", as he was able to access Eastern European pornography made for Western audiences but could not travel to Eastern Europe to create a conventional documentary film.

The film frames the rise of Eastern European gay pornography produced for Western (primarily American) audiences as symptomatic of the economic exploitation of the Eastern Bloc following the fall of communism. The film samples footage from gay pornographic films created between 1993 and 1998 in the Czech Republic, Bulgaria, Hungary, and Russia. It does not show explicit content, instead focusing on the faces of the young male performers. The documentary portrays the pornography of the era as cheaply produced, uncomfortable, and pervaded by "an atmosphere of coercion", noting that many performers participated in pornography out of desperation. The documentary notes that, at the time, Eastern European gay sex workers were paid one-tenth of the wage of Western sex workers, and that "the only thing young people had to sell was access to their bodies".

The film's opening juxtaposes pornographic clips with scenes of Eastern European city streets, markets, and beggars, invoking exoticism and poverty porn. The second half of the film shows screen tests of the performers, drawing attention to their coercive conditions. One performer says that he is "doing it for the money". The film argues that the American audiences that these films were intended for were aroused by the idea that the performers were under duress and showing visible discomfort.

== Reception ==
Jones has stated that The Fall of Communism as Seen in Gay Pornography is his most widely shown work. The film has been screened at multiple art galleries, museums, and events including the Kunstverein in Hamburg, the ACMI, the London Short Film Festival, and the David Kordansky Gallery.

The ACMI described the film as "startling", saying that it "refutes the libertarian aesthetics of much of western queer politics". The Baffler said that The Fall of Communism as Seen in Gay Pornography, alongside the documentary film Ask Any Buddy, present "archival fragments of subcultures and moments that have long since vanished", but that "the ghosts of these moments can still be felt". It also wrote that the two films "explore [...] what it means to desire and be desired", but also "reveal the darkness that lies beneath it—the commodification and exploitation of young men, the packaging of desire for consumption". The magazine Sleek said that the film was "seminal", arguing that the film's thesis on economic exploitation in pornography continues to be applicable to the contemporary global Internet pornography industry.

== See also ==
- Gay-for-pay
- LGBTQ history in Russia
- LGBTQ history in the Soviet Union
