= LGBTQ rights in the post-Soviet states =

LGBTQ rights in the former Soviet Union
- Former Soviet Union
- Legal status: Legal (illegal for males in Turkmenistan and Uzbekistan)
- Gender identity: Legal (except in Armenia, Russia and Turkmenistan)
- Military: Legal in Armenia (varies), Belarus (varies), Estonia, Georgia, Kazakhstan, Latvia, Lithuania, Moldova, Russia and Ukraine (varies)
- Discrimination protections: Legal in Estonia, Georgia, Latvia, Lithuania, Moldova and Ukraine

Family rights
- Recognition of relationships: In Estonia, Latvia and Lithuania Same-sex marriage legal in Estonia
- Adoption: Legal in Estonia. Case law stepchild adoption in Lithuania.

Lesbian, gay, bisexual, transgender, queer, or questioning (LGBTQ) persons in the post-Soviet states face legal challenges not experienced by non-LGBTQ residents.

== History ==
=== After the October Revolution: 1917–1933 ===
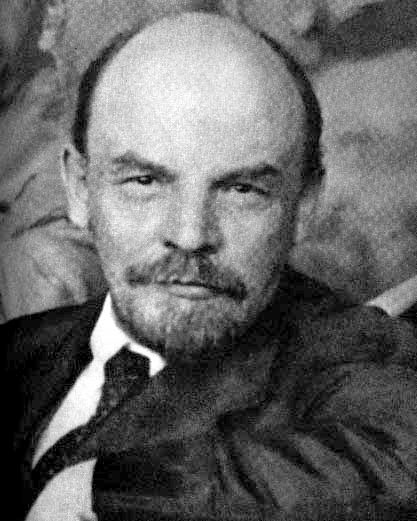
Premier of the Soviet Union Lenin.

The Soviet Government of the Russian Soviet Republic decriminalised homosexuality in December 1917, following the October Revolution and the discarding of the Legal Code of Tsarist Russia.

Through the abolishment of the Tsarist legal code in 1917, the Russian Communist Party effectively legalised homosexuality. The initial Russian Soviet criminal code contained no criminalisation of homosexuality as the subject was omitted.

Yet, the abrogation of the Tsarist law, was part of an overall rejection of the laws of the Russian Empire, and the Soviets never undertook any campaign to reduce prejudice against homosexuality.

The legalisation of private, adult and consensual homosexual relations only applied to the Russian SFSR and the Ukrainian SSR. Homosexuality or sodomy remained a crime in Azerbaijan (officially criminalised in 1923), as well as in the Transcaucasian and Central Asian Soviet Republics throughout the 1920s. Similar criminal laws were enacted in Uzbekistan in 1926 and in Turkmenistan the following year.

Despite decriminalising homosexuality in 1917 wider Soviet social policy on the matter of wider homosexual rights and the treatment of homosexual people in the 1920s was often mixed. Official Soviet policy, in both the RSFSR and the wider USSR, in the 1920s, on homosexuality, fluctuated between toleration and support, attempts at legal equality and social rights for homosexual people, to open examples of state hostility against homosexuals and state attempts to classify homosexuality as 'a mental disorder to be cured'. In the Communist Party itself during this period of the 1920s such divergences of opinion and policy on Soviet treatment of homosexuality was also common - ranging from positive, to negative, to ambivalent, over views about homosexuals and homosexual rights. Some sections and factions of the Bolshevik Government attempted to improve rights and social conditions for homosexuals based on further legal reforms in 1922 and 1923, while others opposed such moves. Commissar of Health Nikolai Semashko, in the early 1920s, for example, was sympathetic to homosexual emancipation 'as part of the [sexual] revolution' and attempted such reforms for homosexual rights in the area of civil and medical areas. According to Wayne R. Dynes, some sections of the Bolsheviks of the 1920s actively considered homosexuality a "[social] illness to be cured" or an example of "bourgeois degeneracy", while other Bolsheviks believed it should be legally/socially tolerated and legally/socially respected in the new socialist society.

The Bolsheviks also rescinded Tzarist legal bans on homosexual civil and political rights - especially in the area of state employment. In 1918 Georgy Chicherin, an openly homosexual man, was appointed as People's Commissar for Foreign Affairs of the RSFSR. In 1923 Chicherin was also appointed People's Commissar for Foreign Affairs of the USSR, a position he held until 1930.

In the early 1920s the Soviet government and scientific community took a great deal of interest in sexual research, sexual emancipation and homosexual emancipation. In the 1920s the Soviet Union sent delegates from the Commissariat of Health, led by Commissar of Health Semashko, in January 1923, to the German Institute for Sexual Research, as well as to some international conferences on human sexuality between 1921 and 1930, where they expressed support for the legalisation of adult, private, and consensual homosexual relations, and the improvement of homosexual rights in all nations. In both 1923 and 1925 Dr Grigorii Batkis, director of the Institute for Social Hygiene in Moscow, published a report, The Sexual Revolution in Russia, which stated that homosexuality was 'perfectly natural' and should be legally and socially respected. In the Soviet Union itself the 1920s saw developments in serious Soviet research on sexuality in general, sometimes in support of the progressive idea of homosexuality as a natural part of human sexuality - such as the work of Dr Batkis prior to 1928. Such delegations and research were sent, and authorised, and supported by the People's Commissariat for Health under Commissar Semashko.

However, in the late 1920s and early 1930s, Soviet policy and attitudes on homosexuality and homosexual rights changed, alongside wider social backlashes against homosexual rights in general in the USSR. Along with increased repression of political dissidents and non-Russian nationalities under Stalin, LGBTQ themes and issues faced increasing official government censorship, and a uniformly harsher policy across the entire Soviet Union. Homosexuality was officially labelled a disease and a mental disorder in the late 1920s (specifically over a period from 1927 to 1930). In this climate Commissar Semashko reduced his support for homosexual rights and Dr Batkis and other sexual researchers repudiated (in 1928) their own earlier scientific reports of homosexuality as a natural human sexuality. This followed earlier Soviet tendencies in sections of the medical and health communities, even in the early 1920s, to classify homosexuality, if not as a crime, then as an example of mental or physical illness. Earlier examples of this type of hardening Soviet attitude towards homosexuality include the 1923 report from the People's Commissariat for Health entitled The Sexual Life of Contemporary Youth, authored by Izrail Gel'man, which stated that "Science has now established, with precision that excludes all doubt, that homosexuality is not ill will or crime but sickness. The world of a female or male homosexual is perverted, it is alien to the normal sexual attraction that exists in a normal person." The official stance from the late 1920s could be summarised in an article of the Great Soviet Encyclopedia of 1930 written by medical expert Sereisky (based on a report written in the 1920s):

Soviet legislation does not recognise so-called crimes against morality. Our laws proceed from the principle of protection of society and therefore countenance punishment only in those instances when juveniles and minors are the objects of homosexual interest ... while recognizing the incorrectness of homosexual development ... our society combines prophylactic and other therapeutic measures with all the necessary conditions for making the conflicts that afflict homosexuals as painless as possible and for resolving their typical estrangement from society within the collective

— Sereisky, Great Soviet Encyclopedia, 1930, p. 593

=== Stalin: 1933–1953 ===
In 1933 the Soviet government, under Joseph Stalin, recriminalised homosexuality. On March 7, 1934, Article 121 was added to the criminal code, for the entire Soviet Union, that expressly prohibited only male homosexuality, with up to five years of hard labor in prison. There were no criminal statutes regarding lesbianism. During the Soviet regime, Western observers believed that between 800 and 1,000 men were imprisoned each year under Article 121. The precise reason for the new law is still in some dispute.

Some historians have noted that it was during this time that Soviet propaganda began to depict homosexuality as a sign of fascism, and that Article 121 may have a simple political tool to use against dissidents, irrespective of their true sexual orientation, and to solidify Soviet opposition to Nazi Germany, who had broken its treaty with the USSR.

More recently, a third possible reason for the anti-gay law has emerged from declassified Soviet documents and transcripts. Beyond expressed fears of a vast "counterrevolutionary" or fascist homosexual conspiracy, there were several high-profile arrests of Russian men accused of being pederasts. In 1933, 130 men "were accused of being 'pederasts' – adult males who have sex with boys. Since no records of men having sex with boys at that time are available, it is possible this term was used broadly and crudely to label homosexuality." Whatever the precise reason, homosexuality remained a serious criminal offense until it was repealed in 1993.

The Soviet government itself said very little publicly about the change in the law, and few people seemed to be aware that it existed. In 1934, the British Communist Harry Whyte wrote a long letter to Stalin condemning the law, and its prejudicial motivations. He laid out a Marxist position against the oppression of homosexuals, as a social minority, and compared homophobia to racism, xenophobia and sexism. The letter was not formally replied to.

A few years later, 1936, Justice Commissar Nikolai Krylenko publicly stated that the anti-gay criminal law was correctly aimed at the decadent and effete old ruling classes, thus further linking homosexuality to a right-wing conspiracy, i.e. tsarist aristocracy and German fascists.

=== De-Stalinization and onwards: 1953–1991 ===
When Stalin came to power, homosexuality became a topic unfit for public depiction, defense or discussion. Homosexual or bisexual Soviets who wanted a position within the Communist Party were expected to marry a person of the opposite sex, regardless of their actual sexual orientation. A notable example was the Russian film director Sergei Eisenstein, who despite his homosexuality managed to survive by leading a double life, having affairs with men while married to a woman, producing films that were politically pleasing to Stalin.

After Stalin died in 1953, he was replaced by Nikita Khrushchev, who proceeded to liberalize the Stalin era laws regarding marriage, divorce, and abortion, but the anti-gay criminal law remained. The Khrushchev government believed that absent of a criminal law against homosexuality, the sex between men that occurred in the prison environment would spread into the general population as they released many Stalin-era prisoners. Whereas the Stalin government conflated homosexuality with pedophilia, the Khrushchev government conflated homosexuality with the situational, sometimes forced, sex acts between male prisoners.

In 1958, the Interior Ministry sent a secret memo to law enforcement ordering them to step up enforcement of the anti-gay criminal law. Yet, during the late 1950s - early 1960s, Aline Mosby, a foreign reporter in Russia at the time, attributed to the more liberal attitude of the Khrushchev government to the fact that she did see some gay couples in public and that it was not uncommon to see men waiting outside of certain theaters looking for dates with male performers.

A 1964 Soviet sex manual instructed: "With all the tricks at their disposal, homosexuals seek out and win the confidence of youngsters. Then they proceed to act. Do not under any circumstances allow them to touch you. Such people should be immediately reported to the administrative organs so that they can be removed from society."

Despite these rare examples, thousands of people were imprisoned for homosexuality and government censorship of homosexuality and gay rights did not begin to slowly relax until the early 1970s, allowing for brief statements. Kozlovsky was permitted to include a brief interior monologue about homosexuality in Moscow to the End of the Line (1973). Perhaps the first public endorsement of gay rights since Stalin was a brief statement, critical of Article 121 and calling for its repeal, made in the Textbook of Soviet Criminal Law (1973).

These references were characterized as being brief statements in a novel or textbook and were made by heterosexuals. Vicktor Sosnora was allowed to write about witnessing an elderly gay actor being brutally murdered in a Leningrad bar in The Flying Dutchman (1979), but the book was only allowed to be published in East Germany. When the author was gay and, in particular, if they were seen as supporting gay rights, the censors tended to be much harsher.

Russian gay author Yevgeny Kharitonov illegally circulated some gay fiction before he died of heart failure in 1981. Author Gennady Trifonov served four years of hard labor for circulating his gay poems and, upon his release, was allowed to write and publish only if he avoided depicting or making reference to homosexuality.

In 1984, a group of Russian gay men met and attempted to organize an official gay rights organization, only to be quickly shut down by the KGB. It was not until later in the Glasnost period that public discussion was permitted about re-legalizing private, consensual adult homosexual relations.

A poll conducted in 1989 reported that homosexuals were the most hated group in Russian society and that 30 percent of those polled felt that homosexuals should be liquidated. In a 1991 public opinion poll conducted in Chelyabinsk 30 percent of the respondents aged 16 to 30 years old felt that homosexuals should be "isolated from society," 5 percent felt they should be "liquidated," 60 percent had a "negative" attitude toward gay people and 5 percent labeled their sexual orientation "unfortunate."

In 1989–1990 a Moscow gay rights organization led by Yevgeniya Debryanskaya was permitted to exist, with Roman Kalinin given permission to publish a gay newspaper, "Tema".

The precise number of persons prosecuted under Article 121 is unknown, with the first official information was released only in 1988, but it is believed to be about 1000 prosecuted a year. According to official data, the number of men convicted under Article 121 had been steadily decreasing during the Glasnost period. In 1987, 831 men were sentenced under Article 121; in 1989, 539; in 1990, 497; and in 1991, 462.

=== After 1991 ===
In January 2016, same-sex couples in Estonia were given recognition in the form of cohabitation agreements that gave the same legal protections available to opposite-sex couples. In June 2023, Estonia became the first former Soviet state to legalize same-sex marriage and joint adoption for gay couples. In June 2022, Latvia introduced similar cohabitation agreements (without marriage and adoption). In January 2019, the Supreme Court of Lithuania ruled that same-sex spouses must be granted residence permits, while cohabitation agreements are pending. In July 2024, Latvia legalized civil unions. In April 2025, same-sex civil unions became legal in Lithuania.

== Summary table ==
LGBTQ rights in:	Same-sex sexual activity	Recognition of same-sex unions	Same-sex marriage	Adoption by same-sex couples	LGBTQ people allowed to serve openly in military?	Anti-discrimination laws concerning sexual orientation	Laws concerning gender identity/expression
(Armenian Soviet Socialist Republic) / Armenia	Yes Yes Legal since 2003 + UN decl. sign.	No No	No No Constitutional ban since 2015	No No LGBTQ individuals may adopt, but not same-sex couples.	No No	No No	No No
(Azerbaijan Soviet Socialist Republic) / Azerbaijan	Yes Yes Legal since 2000	No No	No No	No No	No No	No No	No No
(Byelorussian Soviet Socialist Republic) / Belarus	Yes Legal since 1994	No	No Constitutional ban since 1994	No	No / Yes Banned from military service during peacetime, but during wartime homosexuals are permitted to enlist as partially able	No	Yes / No (Highly bureaucratic, lengthy two-stage process.)
(Estonian Soviet Socialist Republic) / Estonia	Yes Legal since 1992 + UN decl. sign.	Yes Cohabitation agreement since 2016	Yes Legal since 2024	Yes Stepchild adoption since 2016; joint adoption since 2024	Yes Includes transgender people	Yes Bans all anti-gay discrimination	Yes Gender reassignment legal; surgery not required
(Georgian Soviet Socialist Republic) / (Georgia (country)) Georgia	Yes Yes Legal since 2000 + UN decl. sign.	No No	No No Constitutional ban since 2018	No No	Unknown	Yes Yes Bans all anti-gay discrimination	Yes Yes Requires sterilization and sex reassignment surgery for change
(Kazakh Soviet Socialist Republic) / Kazakhstan	Yes Yes Legal since 1998	No No	No No	No No	Yes Yes Since 2022	No No	Yes Yes
(Kirghiz Soviet Socialist Republic) / Kyrgyzstan	Yes Yes Legal since 1998	No No	No No Constitutional ban since 2016	No No	Unknown	No No	Yes Yes Requires sex reassignment surgery
(Latvian Soviet Socialist Republic) / Latvia	Yes Legal since 1992 + UN decl. sign.	Yes Registered partnerships since 2024	No Constitutional ban since 2006	No LGBTQ individuals may adopt, but not same-sex couples, incl. stepchild adoption	Yes	Yes Bans some anti-gay discrimination	Yes Legal change allowed but requires "full" transition and doctor's or court's approval. Sterilization required.
(Lithuanian Soviet Socialist Republic) / Lithuania	Yes Legal since 1993 + UN decl. sign.	Yes Registered partnerships since 2025	No Constitutional ban since 1992	Yes / No Stepchild adoption admitted by the judiciary since 2024	Yes Since 2015	Yes Bans all anti-gay discrimination	Yes Effective from 2/2/2022, gender change on legal documents permitted without surgery and no non-binary option available.
(Moldavian Soviet Socialist Republic) / Moldova	Yes Legal since 1995 + UN decl. sign.	No	No Constitutional ban since 1994	No	Yes	Yes Bans all anti-gay discrimination	Yes No longer requires sterilisation or surgery for change since 2017
(Russian Soviet Federative Socialist Republic) / Russia	Yes Yes Fully legal nationwide since 1993 (de-facto illegal in Chechnya)	No No	No No Constitution limits marriage to opposite-sex couples since 2020	No No	Yes Yes	No No	No No Gender change has not been legal since 2023
(Tajik Soviet Socialist Republic) / Tajikistan	Yes Yes Legal since 1998	No No	No No	No No	Unknown	No No	Yes Yes Requires sex reassignment surgery
(Turkmen Soviet Socialist Republic) / Turkmenistan	No No Male illegal since 1927; Penalty: up to 2 years imprisonment. Yes Yes Female always legal	No No	No No	No No	No No	No No	No No
(Ukrainian Soviet Socialist Republic) / Ukraine	Yes Legal since 1991 + UN decl. sign.	No	No Constitutional ban since 1996	No LGBTQ individuals may adopt, but not same-sex couples	Yes	Yes Bans some anti-gay discrimination	Yes No longer requires sterilisation or surgery for change since 2016
(Uzbek Soviet Socialist Republic) / Uzbekistan	No No Male illegal since 1926; Penalty: up to 3 years imprisonment. Yes Yes Female always legal	No No	No No	No No	No No	No No	No No

== See also ==
- Communism and LGBTQ rights
