= Digest of Laws of the Russian Empire =

Code of laws in the Russian Empire

The Digest of Laws of the Russian Empire (Russian: Свод законов Российской империи; pre-1917 orthographic reforms: Сводъ законовъ Россійской имперіи) was the code of penal and civil law in the Russian Empire starting on January 1, 1835.

It was based on the Complete Collection of Laws of the Russian Empire (Полное собрание законов Российской империи; pre-1917: Полное собраніе законовъ Россійской имперіи), which is composed of 46 volumes.

The complete collection was so large, chronologically arranged, and attempted to dictate even the most intimate details of everyday life in an autocratic society, that the Digest of Laws became what most literate people relied on for what was legally allowed.
