= Sergey Muromtsev =

Russian lawyer and politician (1850-1910)

Sergei Muromtsev
- Сергей Муромцев
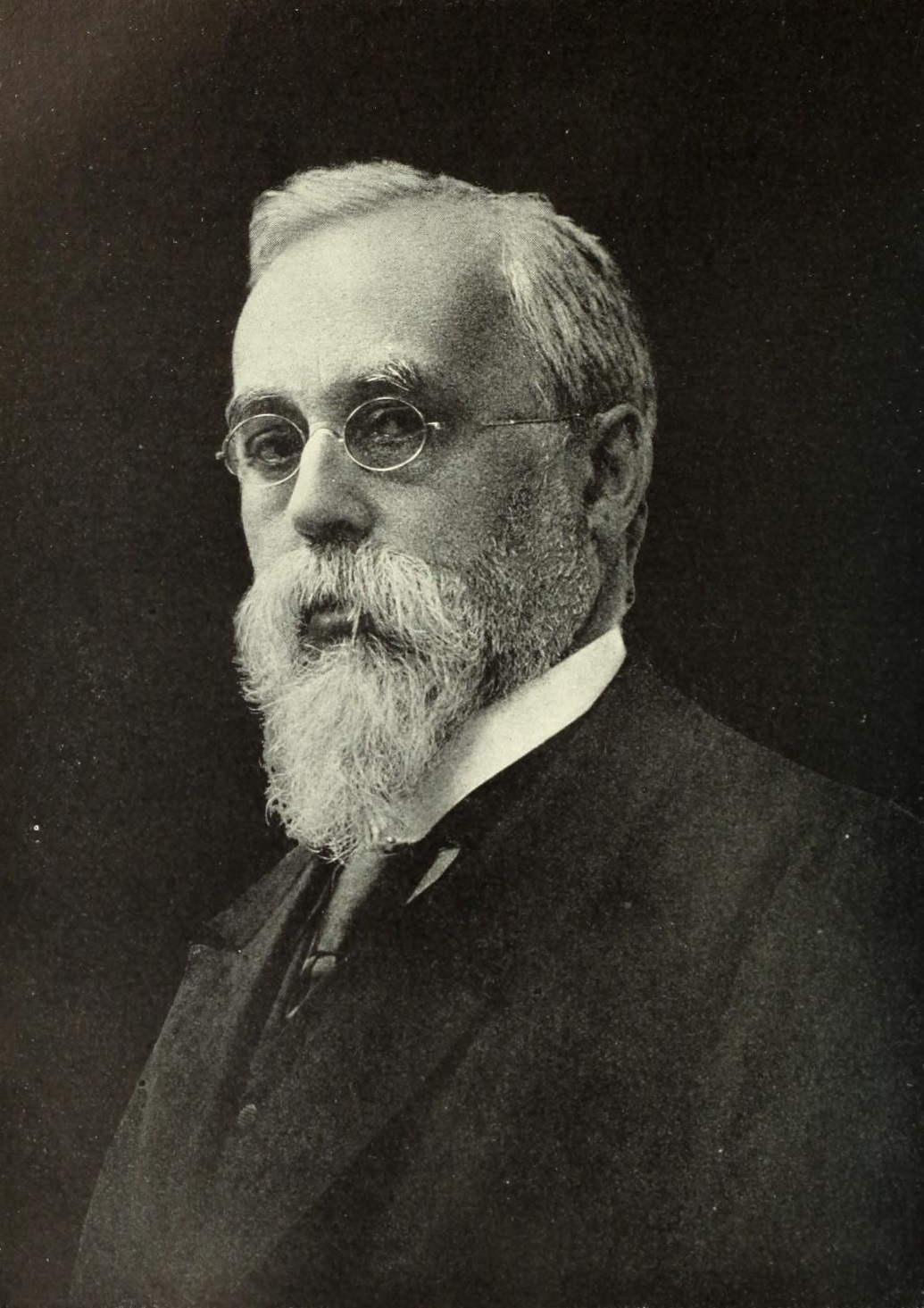
- Muromtsev before 1906

1st Chairman of the State Duma
- In office 27 April 1906 – 8 July 1906
- Monarch: Nicholas II
- Succeeded by: Fyodor Golovin

Personal details
- Born: Sergei Andreevich Muromtsev; 5 October 1850 Saint Petersburg, Russian Empire
- Died: 17 October 1910 (aged 60) Moscow, Russian Empire
- Party: Constitutional Democratic Party
- Spouse: Mariya Klimentova–Muromtseva
- Children: Olga

Sergei Andreevich Muromtsev (Russian: Серге́й Андре́евич Му́ромцев; 5 October [O.S. 23 September] 1850 – 4 October 1910) was a Russian lawyer and politician, and chairman of the First Imperial Duma in 1906.

Muromtsev was a Russian nobleman from Tula and a Professor of Roman Law at Moscow University. In 1893, he and his wife Marya built the Muromtsev Dacha in Moscow. In the late 19th century, he was among the creators of the Constitutional Democratic Party, better known as the KD or Cadet party, of which he was chairman for several years. In April 1906, he was elected as a representative for Moscow in the First Duma, of which he was then elected chairman (or president) on 10 May. He tried to maintain some degree of order and dignity in this difficult assembly, which is often known as the "Duma of the Public Anger".

He was much praised for the way he chaired the debates, always keeping to the strictest legality but always pursuing a constitutional and anti-autocratic agenda. Despite his efforts, the Duma was dissolved on 21 July 1906, by Imperial ukase of tsar Nicholas II. Muromtsev wanted the elected Duma to continue its work and proposed that it should retreat to Finland. For signing this appeal, he was imprisoned for some months and could not be re-elected in the later Dumas.

His funeral, at the New Donskoy Cemetery on 7 October 1910, was the occasion of one of the first public demonstrations of support for constitutional ideas since the dissolution of the Duma. His niece, Vera Muromtseva, was the wife of Ivan Bunin, a celebrated Russian author.

== Contributions to jurisprudence ==
In the 1870s, he advanced the then-novel sociological approach for the study of law, employing the functional (функционального) and historical comparative ("историко-сравнительного") methods. Muromtsev was a staunch opponent of formalism and positivism.

From 1879 to 1892, Muromtsev was the co-editor, along with Maksim Kovalevsky of the law journal Juridical Vestnik («Юридический Вестник»).

== See also ==
- List of Russian legal historians
- Russian legal history
