= Muromtsev Dacha =

Coordinates: 55°36′31.37″N 37°40′5.18″E

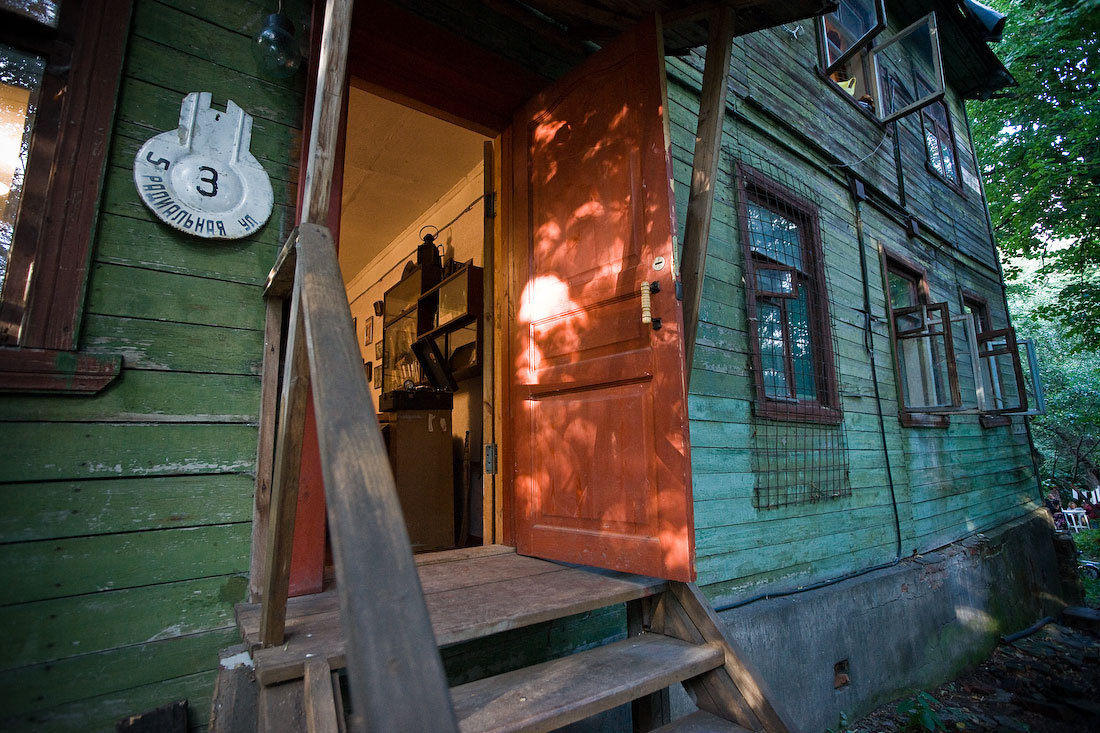
Modern Muromtsev Dacha (1965 - 2010)

The Muromtsev Dacha (Russian: Да́ча Му́ромцева) was a wooden dacha built at the end of the 19th century in Moscow’s southern Tsaritsyno District (“historical Muromtsev Dacha”) and largely rebuilt in the 1960s (“modern Muromtsev Dacha”). It was demolished in 2010.

The historical Muromtsev Dacha was a three-story wooden building with “Swedish-style” turrets. Because of the damage it suffered in the German-Soviet War, it was dismantled, and a new wooden building was erected on its foundations.

== Building history ==
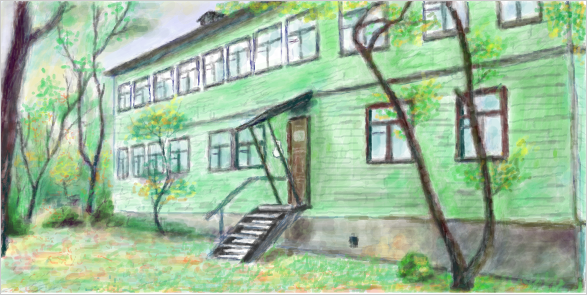
Modern Muromtsev Dacha (1965 - 2010)

The Muromtsev Dacha in Moscow’s Tsaritsyno District was built in 1893 by Sergey Muromtsev. After Muromtsev's death, his wife Marya Nikolaevna Klementova sold it in 1914 to a merchant’s widow, Raisa Ivanovna Vlasova.

In 1918 a large number of the Tsaritsyno dachas were nationalized. The former summer cottages of S. A. Muromtsev and N. P. Bakhrushin were transformed into an elementary and a high school called “Vlasovka” and “Bakhrushinka” after the names of their former owners.

In 1937 a new brick building was erected, and the old ones were transformed into flats for the teachers.

During the German-Soviet War the area was heavily bombed by the German air force because of the proximity of the largest urban grain elevator. During one of the bomb raids in 1941 a high-explosive bomb fell into the pond near the house. One of the walls was damaged and a corner of the house fell in. The slit was stopped up with blankets. Teachers continued to live in the house until 1964.

In the early 1960s the house was largely dismantled and it was rebuilt into a two-storey long-corridor wooden house on a total area of 616 sq.m. The foundations of the old dacha were preserved as well as its furnace, located on the same ground on the floor plans of the old and the new building. In the autumn of 1964 the former inhabitants could move in again.

In 1979 the house was declared uninhabitable because of dilapidation and handed over to the Institute of Clinical and Experimental Medicine (Russian: Институт клинической и экспериментальной медицины (ИКЭМ СО АМН) “to accommodate special equipment” for a period of five years, after which the demolition of the building and improvement of the area was foreseen by the Soviet Academy of Medical Sciences. However, the lease was continuously renewed until 1989.

The house was not demolished then, but the Krasnogvardeysky District executive committee passed it unconditionally to the accounting of the Mercury Commercial Center. In April 1991 this latter gave written authorization to six citizens and their families to live in the house provided they attended to the maintenance of the house and its grounds at their own expense.

On 3 June 1991, “Mercury” wrote the house off their accounting. The house no. 3 on Fifth Radial Street (Russian: Пятая Радиальная улица) formally ceased to exist.

At the end of 2005, in terms of the declaration issued on 24 October 2005 by the Moscow Land Registry, nobody claimed the rights to the plot where the house stood.

In 2006 the inhabitants went to court with the demand to recognize their right of ownership to the house on the basis of Ch. 14, Art. 234, by title of acquisitive prescription. In court, the Moscow City Property Department refused to be a defendant as “the house did not figure in the accounting of the Department”, as did the Department of Housing Policy and Housing Funds because “the house was not officially considered inhabited”.

On 28 August 2007, the administration of Moscow, without waiting for the completion of the proceedings of the recognition of property rights for the residents of the house, handed over the house in the management of the Tsaritsyno State Museum-Reserve.

On 10 October 2007 the Prefecture declared the plot, together with the house, a “parking lot for cleaning and electric equipment”.; on 25 October the right to the property of the house was not owned by anyone, as evidenced by an extract from the Land Registry.

On 3 January 2010, the house was almost completely destroyed by fire, the cause of which was considered arson by the building’s residents (see below).

== Cultural importance ==
The historic owner of the dacha was the Russian lawyer, publicist and politician Sergey Muromtsev, Professor of Moscow University, Chairman of the First Imperial Duma in 1906, co-author of the first Constitution of Russia.

The dacha was built at the expense of Muromtsev’s wife Marya Nikolaevna Klimentova, the famous opera singer who at the personal insistence Pyotr Ilyich Tchaikovsky sang the role of Tatiana for ten years in the opera Eugene Onegin in the Bolshoi Theatre.

The house was often visited by later Nobel laureate Ivan Bunin, who met here his future wife Vera Nikolaevna Muromtseva, niece of the owner of the house. From 1906 they lived together, and although Bunin preferred to travel in abroad, in the summer they often came home to Russia and lived in the spacious dacha of Sergey Muromtsev in Tsaritsyno.

In recent decades a museum was established in the dacha, dedicated to the memory of the several outstanding people who various times visited Tsaritsino or lived here during the past century. A number of celebrities lived and worked in the dacha or were guests of it: the writer Venedict Yerofeyev, director Boris Yukhananov, painter Konstantin Vasilyev, sculptor Vyacheslav Klykov, director Ivan Maximov.

The museum housed the meetings of the veterans of Tsaritsyno, arranged puppet shows for children, student seminars, evenings for the association of families with many children, public readings of contemporary literature, and collective screenings of contemporary Russian animated films organized by “Nike” laureate director Ivan Maximov.

== Application for the recognition of the area as a cultural heritage site ==
On 15 May 2009 the representatives of the Social Movement “Arkhnadzor” Y. V. Mezentseva and K. P. Mikhailov in the legally required way presented an application for the recognition of “the dachas of old Tsaritsyno, linked between 1900 and 1970 to the name prominent national historical and cultural figures S. A. Muromtsev, I. A. Bunin, Venedict Yerofeyev, K. Vasilyev and others, at Fifth Radial Street 3, the former dacha of S. A. Muromtsev, and Fifth Radial Street 7, the gate of the former Yerokhov Dacha” as objects of cultural heritage. This application and the enclosed historical materials, evidencing of the historical and cultural, natural and architectural value of the above-mentioned objects, were registered under the provisional number 16-02-519/9-(1).

In accordance with the Regulation of the City Registry of immovable cultural heritage, as approved by the Government of Moscow on 18 July 2006 under no. 510-PP, the plot and dacha of S. A. Muromtsev and the gate of the Erokhov Dacha as “submitted objects” were registered both in the Registry and in the open electronic submission list on the Internet under the name “Dacha of S. A. Muromtsev where I. A. Bunin lived and worked for 20 years” and “The gate building of the Erokhov Dacha, late 19th-early 20th century”. The application has not been judged yet.

== Demolition and controversy ==
On 7 March 2010 the house was demolished without the executives’ presenting any other legal document than a “permission to remove building debris”. The inhabitants of the house have asserted that the demolition was illegal, while the authorities labeled it “removal of fire debris”.

The newscast Vesti-Moscow of Russia 1 TV Channel reported that among the persons sent to demolish the house there was no bailiff, and that the inhabitants were not shown any writ of execution or order of demolition. “People were thrusted out of the house without any explication. Bulldozers started to break down the walls, although there were people in the building. Those fleeing to the second floor and on the roof were extremely roughly taken away by riot police wearing masks.” A few people, including 20 years old inhabitant Anfisa Boldyreva were taken to hospital after the forced eviction with injuries on the head and elsewhere.

The Prefecture declared to the court that the ownership of the house belonged to them. Their evidence, an extract from the Moscow Land Registry, had no issue or receipt number whatsoever. However, before the beginning of the proceeding – and even as late as 10 September 2008 – it was not on file in the Unified State Registry.

Even before the end of the proceeding for the inhabitants’ rights of property to the house, the Prefecture disposed of the territory and of the house as an owner, without being officially authorized to this by any document. They attempted to intimidate the residents by constant and brutal police raids.

In September 2008 the Unified State Registry repeatedly confirmed that the house was not in the registry, although in the meantime certain state organs have presented claims for this object. According to verbal information, this organ was the City of Moscow.

As of 10 March 2010, the proceeding for the residents’ property right to the house are still in progress. To substantiate such rights, the continuous possession in good faith of the house for a period of 15 years must be evidenced. The court does not accept the testimony of witnesses as an evidence, on the grounds that they are the friends of the inhabitants. However, this refusal is one-sided, as on the basis of utility bills and on the absence of any alternative housing of the residents there can be no doubt on their continuous use of the house.
