= Moscow-Petushki =

Book by Venedikt Yerofeyev

Moscow - Petushki
- Author: Venedict Yerofeyev
- Original title: Москва - Петушки
- Language: Russian
- Genre: postmodernist prose poem
- Publisher: Self-published (Samizdat)
- Publication date: 1970 (Samizdat) & 1973 (commercial release, in Israel)
- Publication place: Soviet Union
- OCLC: 6144525

Moscow-Petushki, also published in English as Moscow to the End of the Line, Moscow Stations, and Moscow Circles, is a postmodernist prose poem by Russian writer and satirist Venedikt Yerofeyev.

Written between 1969 and 1970 and passed around in samizdat, it was first published in 1973 in Israel and later, in 1977, in Paris.

It was published in the Soviet Union only in 1989, during the perestroika era of Soviet history, in the literary almanac Vest' (Весть) and in the magazine Abstinence and Culture (Трезвость и Культура, Trezvost i Kultura) in a slightly abridged form.

According to David Remnick, "Yerofeyev’s vodka-sodden classic is an account of one broken man’s attempt to get from here to there in an era of absolute societal rot. It’s the funniest thing in Russian since Ilf and Petrov".

== Plot ==
The story is a first-person narrative by an alcoholic intellectual, Venya (or Venichka), as he travels by a suburban train on a 125 km (78 mi) journey from Moscow along the Gorkovsky suburban railway line to visit his beautiful beloved and his child in Petushki, a town that is described by the narrator in almost utopian terms.

At the start of the story, he has just been fired from his job as foreman of a telephone cable-laying crew for drawing charts of the amount of alcohol he and his colleagues were consuming before and during work hours. These graphs showed a weird correlation with personal characters. For example, for a Komsomol member, the graph is like the Kremlin Wall, that of a "shagged-out old creep" is like "a breeze on the river Kama", and Venya's chart simply shows his inability to draw a straight line because of the amount he has drunk.

Venichka spends the last of his money on liquor and food for the journey. While on the train, he engages in lengthy monologues about history, philosophy and politics. He also befriends many of his fellow travellers and discusses life in the Soviet Union with them over multiple bottles of alcohol.

Eventually Venichka oversleeps, misses his station, and wakes up on the train headed back for Moscow. Still drunk, half-conscious and tormented by fantastic visions, he wanders the night city streets aimlessly, happens upon a gang of thugs, who chase and murder him.

== Literary criticism ==
Moscow-Petushki is a complicated work with a seemingly simple plot. Its text intermixes pathos with obscenities; it includes apparent and veiled references to the Bible, to Russian classical literature and to Soviet cliches. Literary critic Lev Oborin draws a parallel of the novel with another prominent Russian satirical novel Dead Souls, in which the plot of a travel of the main character is filled with numerous satirical and pathetical digressions.

The historian-orientalist and religious scholar Alexei Muravyev interprets Yerofeyev's poem as an apocalyptic narrative about eschatological journey to God: "Yerofeyev's hero goes to God, but he can only get there by emptying, gutting himself and, eventually, passing through death. The four people mentioned in this treatise are the four Horsemen of the apocalypse."

Others note the kenotic motifs peculiar to the Orthodox spiritual tradition: humiliation that opens the way to the heaven. "Kenosis is the descent of being, the urge to descend, down. Again, to death as the shortest – the only possible! – paths to paradise. And Venichka's return from halfway to Petushki back to Moscow, to the Kremlin they had never seen before – this is the Christian mystery..."

Of note are numerous cocktails invented by Venichka, with ironical names, such as "Komsomol Girl's Tear", "Canaan Balsam", "The Spirit of Geneva", "Currents of Jordan", "The First Kiss", "The Kiss Forced", etc. Quite a few commentaries to the novel tried to figure out the meanings of the allusions in their recipes, pondering issues such as why Venicka states that in "The Spirit of Geneva" it is inadmissible to replace white lilac with silvery lily of the valley, regardless of Venichka's explanation that "lily of the valley, for example, excites the mind, disturbs the conscience, and strengthens the sense of justice. And white lilac, on the contrary, calms the conscience and reconciles a person with the ulcers of life...".

== Stage versions ==
The first play by the novel was staged at the Experimental Stage of the Altai Theatre in Barnaul directed by Vitaly Mozgalin. In a 1989 interview to the newspaper Vzglyad Yerofeyev said he disliked it.

In 1994, Moscow Stations was adapted as a one-man play (from a translation by Stephen Mulrine) and presented at the Garrick Theatre, London, starring Tom Courtenay in the role of Venya. The production won Critics Circle and Evening Standard awards, and transferred to New York in 1995 where it played at the Union Square Theatre, receiving excellent reviews.

== Monument ==
There is a monument for the novel in Struggle Square, Moscow, by the artists Valery Kuznetsov and Sergei Mantserev, unveiled on May 11, 2000, the 10th anniversary of the writer's death. It consists of two sculptures. One shows a man clinging to the train station sign Moscow and the sentence "You cannot trust an opinion of a person who hasn't yet got some hair of the dog" written on the pedestal. The other one shows a young woman under the train station sign Petushki and the sentence "In Petushki the jasmine never stops blooming and the birds always sing".
