= Anti-gay purges in Chechnya =

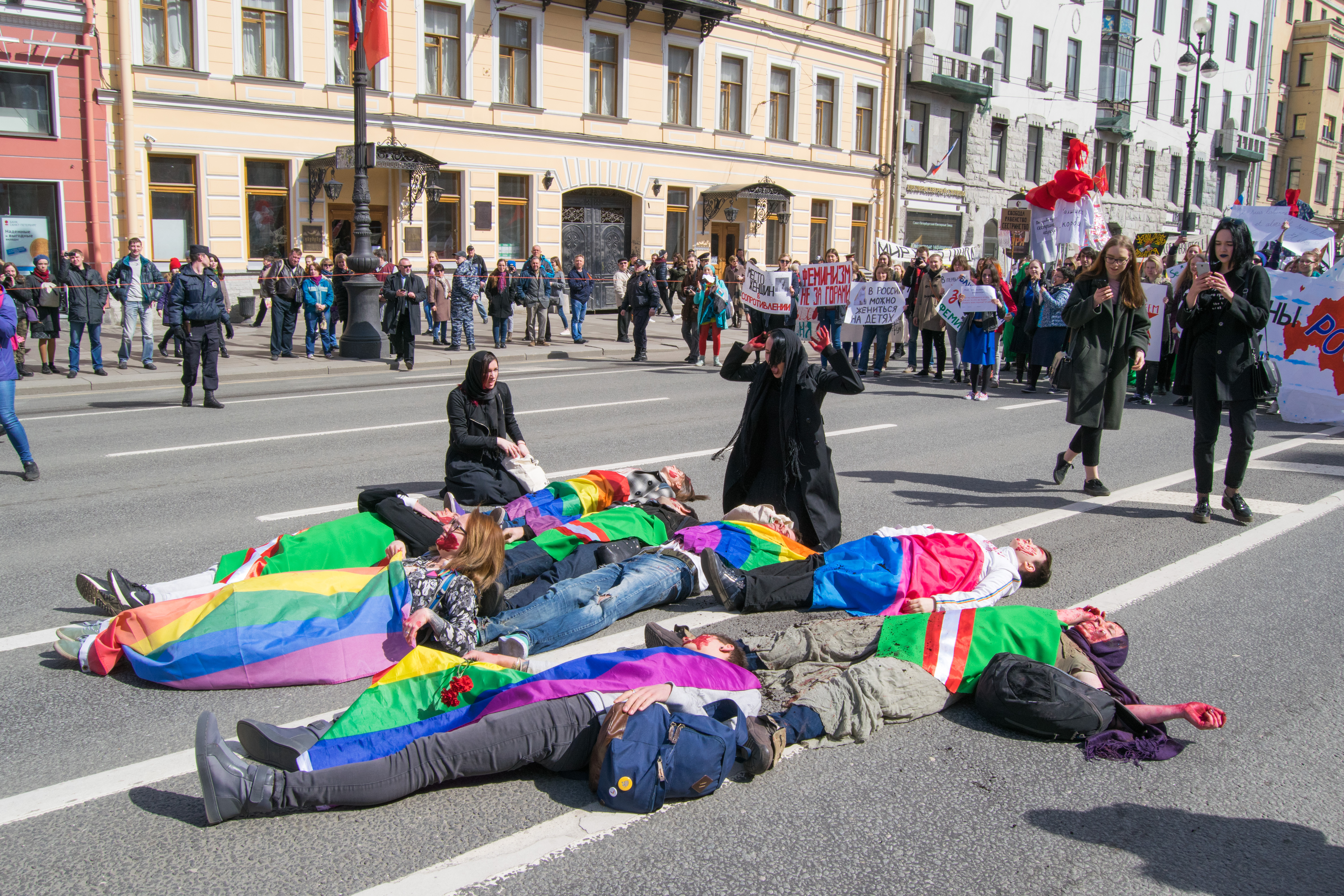
- A public die-in demonstration, "Chechen mothers mourn their children", was staged on 1 May 2017 after a purge on Nevsky Prospect in Saint Petersburg, to protest the persecution of gay men in Chechnya.
- Location: Chechnya
- Date: Early 2017–present
- Target: Primarily gay men
- Attack type: Purge
- Perpetrator: Kadyrovites

Anti-gay purges in Chechnya, a part of the Russian Federation, have included forced disappearances, secret abductions, imprisonment, torture and extrajudicial killing by authorities targeting persons based on their perceived sexual orientation, primarily gay men. At least 2 of the 100 people, whom authorities detained on suspicion of being gay or bisexual, have reportedly died after being held in what human rights groups and eyewitnesses have called concentration camps.

Allegations were initially reported on 1 April 2017 in Novaya Gazeta, a Russian-language opposition newspaper, which reported that since February 2017 over 100 men had allegedly been detained and tortured and at least three had died in extrajudicial killings. The paper, citing its sources in the Chechen special services, called the wave of detentions a "prophylactic sweep". The journalist who first reported on the subject went into hiding. There have been calls for reprisals against journalists who report on the situation.

As news spread of Chechen authorities' actions, which have been described as part of a systematic anti-LGBTQ purge, Russian and international activists scrambled to evacuate survivors of the camps and other vulnerable Chechens but were met with difficulty obtaining visas to conduct them safely beyond Russia.

The reports of the persecution were met with a variety of reactions worldwide. The Head of the Chechen Republic Ramzan Kadyrov denied not only the occurrence of any persecution but also the existence of gay men in Chechnya, adding that such people would be killed by their own families. Officials in Moscow were skeptical, although in late May the Russian government reportedly agreed to send an investigative team to Chechnya. Numerous national leaders and other public figures in the West condemned Chechnya's actions, and protests were held in Russia and elsewhere. A report released in December 2018 by the Organization for Security and Cooperation in Europe (OSCE) confirmed claims that persecution of LGBT persons had taken place and was ignored by authorities. In a 2021 Council of Europe report into anti-LGBTI hate crimes, rapporteur Foura ben Chikha described the "state-sponsored attacks carried out against LGBTI people in Chechnya in 2017" as "the single most egregious example of violence against LGBTI people in Europe that has occurred in decades".

On 11 January 2019, it was reported that another 'gay purge' had begun in the country in December 2018, with several gay men and women being detained. The Russian LGBT Network believes that around 40 people were detained and two killed.

Though some men have fled Chechnya, and in some cases have received status in the countries where they moved, Chechen agents have pursued them out of the region. In some instances, false accusations have been made to prosecute the detainees.

In September 2022, Chechen authorities detained at least six men on suspicion of being gay, threatening them with fabricated criminal charges and coercing them into signing military contracts to fight in Ukraine. According to the North Caucasus SOS Crisis Group, at least seven such cases were confirmed, one of whom was subsequently killed at the front. Similar detentions continued into 2023, when four men and one woman were detained; the men were again forcibly sent to fight in Ukraine.

On 30 November 2023, Russia's Supreme Court declared the "international LGBT movement" an extremist organization, effectively banning all LGBT rights activism in the country. The ruling was condemned by the UN High Commissioner for Human Rights, Amnesty International, and Human Rights Watch, who warned it exposed LGBT people and their defenders to criminal prosecution carrying sentences of up to ten years.

== Background ==
The status of LGBT rights in the Chechen Republic has long been a cause of concern to human rights organizations (including Amnesty International) and it has also been described as being "especially bleak" within the Russian Federation as a whole. It was also singled out for criticism by human rights organisations such as Amnesty International before the 2017 crackdown. Chechnya is a predominantly Muslim, ultra-conservative society in which homophobia is widespread and homosexuality is taboo, and where having a gay relative is seen as a "stain on the entire extended family".

The federal Russian LGBT laws apply in Chechnya, which is a part of the Russian Federation. However, in Chechnya, as in other regions of southern Russia, Russian President Vladimir Putin "has empowered local leaders to enforce their interpretation of traditional values, partly in an effort to co-opt religious extremism, which has largely been driven underground".

Although homosexuality was legalized in Russia in 1993, in 1996 Chechnya's separatist president Aslan Maskhadov adopted sharia law in his Chechen Republic of Ichkeria, and article 148 of the Chechen penal code made all "sodomy" punishable by caning after the first two offenses and punishable by execution after the third offense. Chechnya returned to direct Russian rule in 2000, formally complying with its federal laws and human right statutes. De facto, it retains some autonomy, and the current Head of the Chechen Republic, Ramzan Kadyrov, "has brought Islam to the fore of Chechnya's daily life, and gay people who reveal their sexuality are often discriminated against and shunned by their families".

== Key events ==
=== Large-scale raids and killings ===
The detentions began in February 2017 after a Chechen man who had allegedly committed a drug-related offense was stopped by police and arresting officers discovered contact information for other gay men on his phone.

A second wave of detentions began after the LGBT rights organization Gayrussia.ru applied for permits to hold gay pride parades in four cities within Kabardino-Balkaria in Russia's predominantly Muslim North Caucasus region, although not within Chechnya itself. The application in this district was denied by the Kabardino-Balkar authorities. An anti-gay demonstration followed, along with posts on social media calling for gay people to be murdered by various methods.

Gayrussia.ru organizer Nikolay Alexeyev dismissed suggestions that attempts to organize pride parades in the region had sparked the violence against gay Chechens as speculative and unfounded. The organization had not focused on the Muslim districts in particular, and it had applied for permits for gay pride parades in 90 municipal governments all across Russia in an attempt to collect the inevitable denials, which would be used in a case about freedom of assembly and gay rights before the European Court of Human Rights.

Human Rights Watch reported in 2017 that "it is difficult to overstate just how vulnerable LGBT people are in Chechnya, where homophobia is intense and rampant. LGBT people are in danger not only of persecution by the authorities but also of falling victim to 'honour killings' by their own relatives for tarnishing family honor." Kadyrov has encouraged extrajudicial killings by family members as an alternative to law enforcement – in some cases, gay men in prison have been released early specifically to enable their murder by relatives.

The Chechen police and military have conducted entrapment schemes, in which a victim is lured on a date, beaten and humiliated. A recording is produced, and blackmail money is solicited in return for silence. Law enforcement agencies in Chechnya already keep lists of "suspects". According to a source from Radio Liberty, raids on gay people began in December 2016, subsided briefly, and resumed on a large scale in February 2017. The first gay men who were detained via entrapment were tortured in attempts to reveal the names of their acquaintances.

All of the correspondence in their phones was checked, adding to the "suspect" list. This resulted in the number of victims growing exponentially. According to Novaya Gazeta, at the end of February, the police detained and checked the phone of a person who was in a state of intoxication. The phone had "pictures and videos with explicit content" and "dozens of contacts of local homosexuals". The detainee was sent to a "secret prison". Subsequently, a "wave of persecution" began in Chechnya as an attempt to purge the country of those who are homosexual or are perceived to be homosexual. Chechen police are reportedly pressuring parents in the region to kill their children who they suspect of being homosexual. To facilitate this, police have reportedly been releasing detainees into the custody of their families and outing them.

=== Imprisonment and torture ===
According to independent media and human rights groups, gay men are sent to clandestine camps in Chechnya, which one eyewitness described to Novaya Gazeta as a "closed prison, the existence of which no one officially knows". Around 100 men have been imprisoned and at least three people have already died. Some of the guards in these allegedly unofficial jails are accused of releasing the prisoners to their relatives if their relatives promise to kill them (at least one man was reported by a witness as having died after returning to his family). One location of a secret prison is allegedly in the southern city of Argun. Another prison is located in Tsotsin-Yurt, south of the Chechen capital Grozny.

According to escapees interviewed in the Russian newspaper Novaya Gazeta and the British-owned The Guardian, 30 to 40 people are detained in one room (two to three metres big), and often kept for months on end without trial. Witnesses report they are also beaten (with polypropylene pipes below the waist), and tortured with electricity. In addition to physical torture, individuals report being mocked, humiliated and insulted, as well as being forced to clean the prison and spat in the face. In some cases the process of torture ends in the death of the person being tortured.

In May 2017, it was reported that the building in Argun had been buried under demolition rubble and that prisoners had been moved to a new, unknown location. Investigators say that prisoners are likely to have been moved to a Special Police Force training base in Terek, about 60 kilometres (37 mi) 60 in Argun, but they have been denied entry, because "training is taking place".

=== Media's attention ===
The persecution of LGBT people in Chechnya beginning in early 2017 is "particularly well documented." Human Rights Watch has confirmed that authorities have "rounded up dozens of men on suspicion of being gay and that they are currently torturing and humiliating the victims. Some of the men have forcibly disappeared. At least three men have died since this brutal campaign began." An investigation by Radio Liberty in April 2017 reported that prisoners are being released to their families if their families promise to murder them.

A lengthy analysis published on 26 May by Human Rights Watch reported the presence of leading government officials at the camps while detainees were being tortured. The report, which includes graphic descriptions of the ordeals faced by several survivors of the camps, suggested that several victims of the camps were still being detained at the time of its publication.

In June, a journalist with VICE News visited a now-abandoned detention center in Argun believed to be the site of one of the camps, and interviewed the local minister of internal affairs, who also acts as prison warden. The warden denied that abuse had taken place, and said, "My officers would not even want to touch such people, if they exist, let alone beating or torturing them". Shown footage of the detention center, a man who described being electrocuted by his captors identified it as the site where he was held, and also identified the warden as one of his tormentors.

In December 2018, the Organization for Security and Cooperation in Europe (OSCE) special rapporteur found that there was "overwhelming evidence that there have been grave violations of the rights of LGBTI persons in the Chechen Republic." The OSCE found that there were several waves of persecution or "purges" of LGBT: the first from December 2016 to February 2017; the second wave from March to May 2017, and a subsequent third, "which largely stopped because of the international outcry." The OSCE report found that there were "still new cases as recent as September and October 2018." The OSCE report found that the persecutions followed a consistent pattern. Persons suspected of being homosexual would be arrested (at homes, workplaces, or while traveling) by police and military officers, particular black-clad SOBR members. Those arrested would be taken to a police station and then later a detention facility, sometimes an "unofficial prison"; Argun was a common location. Those arrested would be humiliated, tortured, and interrogated to force a confession "that they were gay and to give names of other gays"; torture methods included being beaten with various items such as sticks, tubes, and cables, and sometimes electric shocks. Prisoners were often forced to work, sometimes by cleaning cars or floors. Medical treatment, food, and water was withheld from the prisoners. Prisoners were "mistreated and tortured on a daily basis mostly for about two weeks or until they made and signed a confession or reported others or expressed their willingness to cooperate." Some were reportedly killed; others were ransomed; some were told to commit suicide; others were handed over to their relatives, who were told to kill them, and "In many cases victims have been forced to marry in order to save the family honor."

Experts at the Office of the High Commissioner for Human Rights released a statement in 2019, indicating the worsening situation of LGBT people in Chechnya: "Abuse inflicted on victims has allegedly become more cruel and violent compared with reports from 2017. It is no longer only gay men in Chechnya who are being targeted but women also." Reportedly, more than 40 people have been arrested since December 2018. People who tried to flee the republic were prevented from doing so by the authorities.

=== A second wave of persecutions in 2019 ===
After a lull, the Russian LGBT Network announced in July 2017 that it was again receiving reports of authorities persecuting gay Chechens. The group voiced doubt that the Russian government was conducting an actual investigation, despite earlier claims to the contrary from the Kremlin.

=== Forced military service in Russo-Ukrainian War ===
In September 2024, North Caucasus SOS published a report claiming that security forces in Chechnya were detaining homosexual men, and forcing them to Ukraine by blackmailing them into volunteering for the frontlines. They cited seven incidents of this, beginning prior to September 2022 mobilizations. Men were detained for being homosexual, and then given the choice of paying a ransom or volunteering for the war in Ukraine. The Akhmat unit was using the mobilized queer men as sex slaves, according to David Isteev.

== Individual cases ==
=== Maxim Lapunov ===
On 15 March 2017, a gay man by the name of Maxim Lapunov was detained by police in Grozny in a sting, and subsequently brought to the police station, where he was allegedly beaten, tortured and raped, and held hostage for 12 days. Lapunov became the only person to put a face to the official complaints against Chechen authorities in 2017.

A North Caucasus court subsequently ruled against opening a criminal investigation into the case. Justice minister Alexander Konovalov said preliminary investigations found no evidence of arrests and torture.

In May 2019, Lapunov filed a complaint with the European Court of Human Rights (ECHR), saying Russia had failed to protect him as he was arrested and beaten up by police in the Chechen capital Grozny in 2017, and claiming his case was not properly investigated by Russian authorities. On 12 September 2023, the ECHR found that Lapunov had been "detained and subjected to ill-treatment by state agents [which] amounted to torture" and was perpetrated "solely on account of his sexual orientation".

He appeared as himself in the film Welcome to Chechnya.

On 12 September 2023, the ECHR ruled in the case of Maxim Lapunov — the only publicly identified victim of the 2017 purge to seek legal redress — finding that he had been detained and tortured by state agents "solely on account of his sexual orientation." Following Russia's expulsion from the Council of Europe in 2022, there is no mechanism to compel implementation of the ruling.

=== Disappearance of Zelim Bakaev ===
While on a visit to Grozny for his sister's wedding in August 2017, Moscow-based Chechen singer Zelim Bakaev disappeared, never to be seen again. He was reportedly arrested by security forces, according to eyewitnesses in local media reports, and his cell phone deactivated on the day of his disappearance. The singer's mother made a public appeal to Chechen president Ramzan Kadyrov but Chechen authorities have refused to open an investigation into Bakaev's disappearance.

Dzhambulat Umarov, Chechnya's minister for national policy, external relations, press, and information, was quoted in RBC as saying, "The guy is not a Wahhabi, not a terrorist, he isn't involved in any cases. No structures took him, for a hundred years no-one will need him", adding that Bakaev would "reappear soon".

=== Salekh Magamadov and Ismail Isaev ===
The brothers Salekh Magamadov and Ismail Isaev, who are gay, moved to the city of Nizhny Novgorod in Russia July 2020 with the intention to flee the country. Chechen authorities abducted them and took them back in February 2021. They were booked under the country's anti-terrorism laws for allegedly providing food to terrorists. In February 2022 they were convicted. They appealed but the decision upheld.

=== Idris Arsamikov ===
Idris Arsamikov fled to the Netherlands in 2018 after having been tortured. In May 2022, Arsamikov returned to Chechnya to attend his father's funeral. Once in Chechnya, the police confiscated all his foreign documents so he could not leave. He was repeatedly arrested and tortured during the year. On February 15, 2023, he was arrested again at Moscow Domodedovo Airport, charged with fraud, and sent back to Chechnya. His whereabouts are unknown. A video made while in jail shows Arsamikov saying that he is fine and does not need help.

== Response of the Russian authorities ==
=== Statements by the Chechen and Russian authorities ===
Chechen and Russian authorities have denied that the purges and persecutions occurred. Chechen government authorities denied that purges occurred. Alvi Karimov, a spokesperson for Ramzan Kadyrov, claimed that gay people "just don't exist in the republic" and that "If there were such people in Chechnya, the law-enforcement organs wouldn't need to have anything to do with them because their relatives would send them somewhere from which there is no returning," an apparent reference to so-called "honor killing." Karimov later claimed that reports of persecutions of LGBT people were part of an "economic, political, psychological and informational attack directed against Russia" waged by Americans and Europeans, and asserted that "There is not a single case of arrest on these grounds in Chechnya." In a July 2017 television interview, Kadyrov denied the existence of any gays in Chechnya, saying "We don't have any gays. If there are any, take them to Canada. To purify our blood, if there are any here, take them." Kadyrov called the men who stated they had been tortured "devils" and "subhuman." In January 2019, following reports of a new wave of anti-gay purges beginning December 2018, Dzhambulat Umarov, the Chechen Minister of National Policy, claimed that gay people's "sick imagination" was to blame for purge reports. Russian President Vladimir Putin, through his spokesman Dmitry Peskov, endorsed Chechen leaders' denials of anti-gay persecution, and Russian Minister of Foreign Affairs Sergey Lavrov claimed the reports were not "based on fact."

Sources have said that Chechen leader Ramzan Kadyrov wanted the LGBT community to be eliminated by 26 May 2017.

=== Arrests and the targeting of activists and journalists ===
The Russian LGBT Network, an inter-regional LGBT rights organization based in Saint Petersburg, is attempting to assist those who are threatened and evacuate them from Chechnya. In May 2019, the association reported that seven people broke into the apartment of one of its volunteers in Saint Petersburg, where they threatened the activist and other staff with physical violence and murder, saying "We will take you to the police office and will break all your bones." The assailants interrogated the activists about the whereabouts of a young Chechen woman who had escaped from the region and Russian LGBT Network emergency programme coordinator David Isteev, saying "to tell David Isteev that they were going to find and kill him." Three of the assailants were identified as Chechens and four implied they were police officers from Chechnya's capital Grozny, but refused to provide identification documents.

In May 2017, five activists were arrested in Moscow while en route to the prosecutor general's office to deliver a petition calling for an unbiased investigation. According to the Russian LGBT Network, the petition bore more than two million signatures of people in various countries. The arrests followed an incident at a May Day parade in St. Petersburg in which riot police reportedly detained 17 protesters who sought to bring attention to the anti-gay violence in Chechnya.

In January 2019, Igor Kochetkov, a leading Russian LGBT Network activist, filed a complaint with the Investigative Department of Russia's Interior Ministry, naming 14 people that authorities unlawfully detained and tortured in Chechnya's capital, Grozny. He also reported the name of one man who police allegedly killed in January. After the complaint, however, Ali Baskhanov, the leader of a pro-government group in Chechnya, uploaded a YouTube video threatening Kochetkov, calling him a "son of the devil," and warned that if he came to Chechnya it would be his "final stop", according to Human Rights Watch. Kochetkov says authorities did not take his complaints of the threat seriously. He is now planning to sue the Investigative Department. Human Rights Watch urged to Russia to protect the activist and said that "The threats against Igor Kochetkov are very serious and deserve a prompt reaction by the Russian authorities. Given the danger LGBT people have been facing in Chechnya, the Interior Ministry's lack of response is dangerous and unacceptable."

=== Investigation by the Kremlin's human rights ombudswoman ===
In late May 2017, following weeks of international pressure, the Kremlin authorized its human rights ombudswoman, Tatyana Moskalkova, to conduct an investigation, Investigators were sent to Chechnya. but Chechen officials attempted to sabotage the team's investigation. In 2020, the Russian newspaper Novaya Gazeta reported that Chechen authorities had deliberately attempted to deceive Moskalkova; in September 2017 meetings in Chechnya, Moskalkova met with two men "identified to her as being among those who had reportedly been killed in the raids, [...] in what appeared to be an effort by local authorities to undermine the reports about the raids"; the men were in fact the siblings of two men who were victims of extrajudicial killings.

== International reactions ==
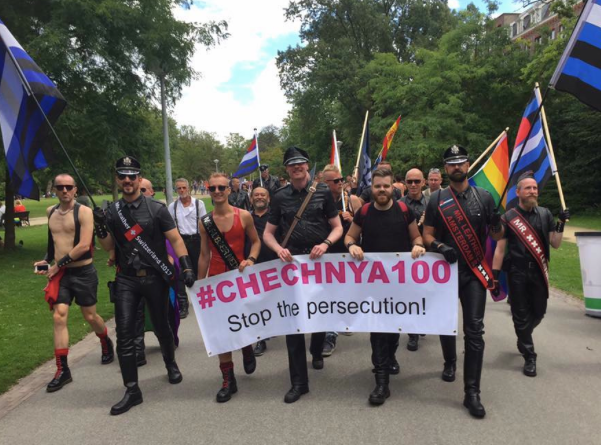
Protest and fundraising during Amsterdam Pride Walk 2017.

Human rights groups and foreign governments have called upon Russia and Chechnya to put an end to the torture and killings of gays.

=== United Nations and other intergovernmental bodies ===
In April 2017, a panel of five experts that advises the United Nations Human Rights Council called on Chechnya to "put an end to the persecution of people perceived to be gay or bisexual in the Chechen Republic who are living in a climate of fear fueled by homophobic speeches by local authorities"; the same month, the director of the human rights office at the Organization for Security and Cooperation in Europe said that Moscow must "urgently investigate the alleged disappearance, torture and other ill-treatment" of gay men in Chechnya.

In January 2019, the UN Office of the High Commissioner for Human Rights (OHCHR) expressed its concern with reports of additional arrests following an anti-purge in the Russian republic, and called on Russia to take action to halt the detention and abuse of gay and bisexual people in Chechnya. The UN experts are Elina Steinerte, Agnes Callamard, David Kaye, Victor Madrigal-Borloz, Nils Melzer, Dubravka Šimonovic, and Ivana Radačić.

In March 2019, a number of countries, at the 40th Session of the Human Rights Council, issued a joint statement calling for "a swift, thorough and impartial investigation into the alleged persecution" and accountability for those responsible. Albania, Argentina, Australia, Austria, Belgium, Canada, Chile, Costa Rica, Czech Republic, Denmark, Estonia, Finland, France, Germany, Iceland, Italy, Ireland, Latvia, Lithuania, Luxembourg, Malta, Montenegro, the Netherlands, New Zealand, Norway, Slovenia, Spain, Sweden, Switzerland, Ukraine, the United Kingdom and Uruguay all supported the joint statement; however, the United States under the Trump administration refused to sign on to the statement.

=== Human rights and LGBT organizations ===
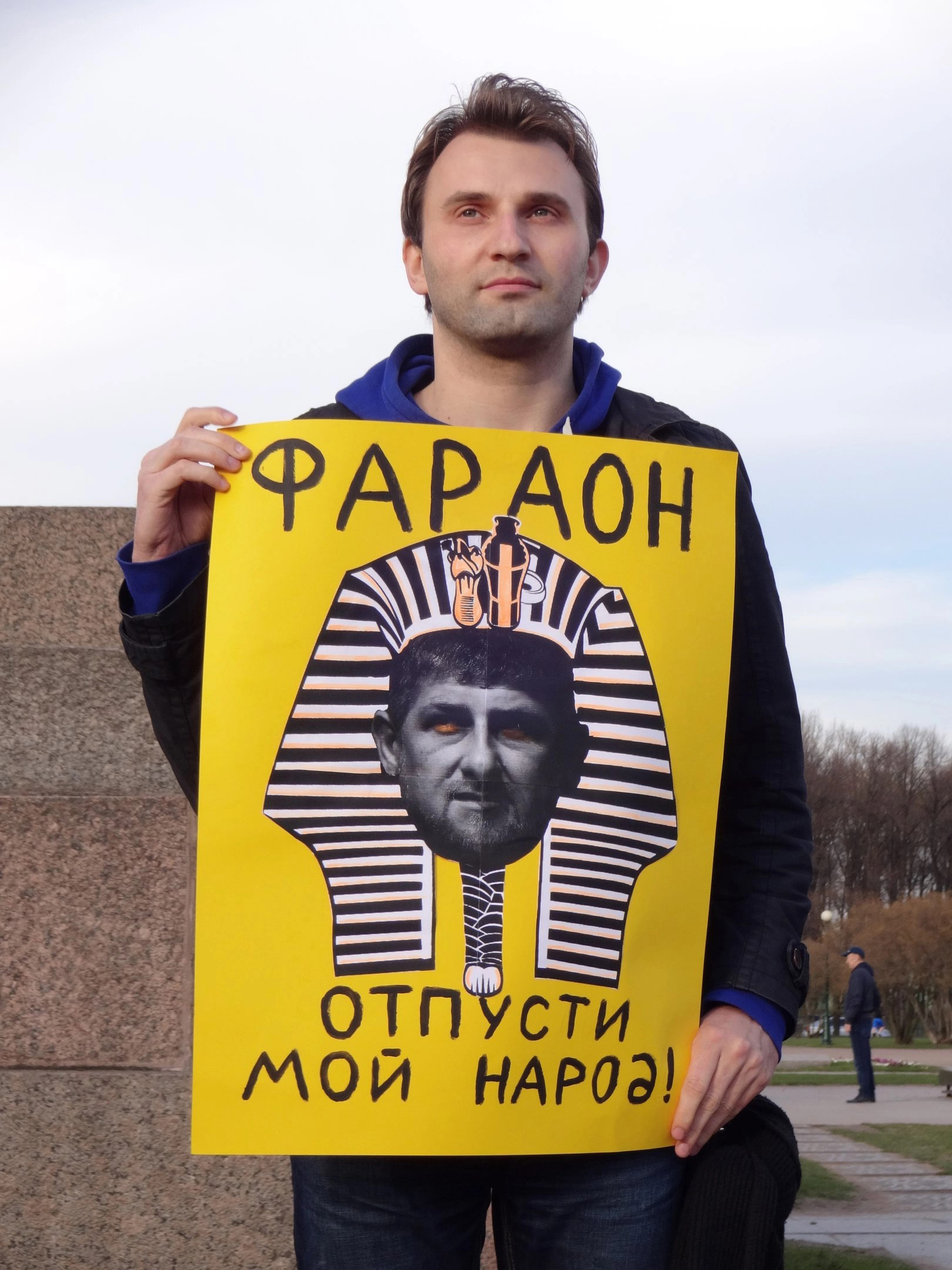
Petr Voskresensky-Stekanov with poster with Ramzan Kadyrov and the demand "Pharaoh, let my people go!". May 17, 2017.

In April 2017 Amnesty International called for a prompt investigation and intervention, and more than 130,000 people signed a petition started by the organization in opposition to alleged human rights violations. The same month, the United States Holocaust Memorial Museum condemned the persecution of gay men in Chechnya and called on Chechen and Russian authorities to investigate the matter and "ensure the safety of LGBT populations within the Russian Federation".

Three France-based human rights organizations filed a complaint in May 2017 with the International Criminal Court (ICC) accusing Chechen government officials of genocide. and Chechen President Kadyrov as the "logistician" of the concentration camps. Putin announced in 2016 that Russia, which signed but never ratified the treaty creating the ICC, would end its relationship with the treaty in November 2017.

Many celebrities and LGBT activists such as Troye Sivan, Ellen DeGeneres, Matt Bomer, Mark Ruffalo, and Billy Eichner have voiced their strong condemnation of persecution of LGBT persons in Chechnya.

In February 2021, the European Center for Constitutional and Human Rights and the Russian LGBT Network filed a 97-page charge sheet against five Chechen officials connected with Kadyrov, including his deputy prime minister Abuzayed Vismuradov, police chief Ayub Katayev, and the chair of the Chechen parliament, Magomed Daudov. If accepted by German authorities, the five named officials would be charged with crimes against humanity.

==== Protests outside Russian diplomatic missions ====
Hundreds of people have attended demonstrations outside Russian diplomatic missions, protesting the anti-gay persecutions in Chechnya. Demonstrations took place in April 2017, outside the Embassy of Russia in London; and in January 2019, outside New York City's Russian Consulate, in solidarity with gay and lesbian people facing a "second wave" of persecution in Chechnya. On the occasion of International Holocaust Remembrance Day, a protest attended by around a hundred people was held on 27 January 2019, outside the Embassy of Russia in London. In May 2019, on the International Day Against Homophobia, Transphobia and Biphobia, LGBT activists laid a giant rainbow flag on the steps of the Russian embassy in London, handing in a 65,000-signature petition calling on the Russian authorities to investigate the purge.

=== Foreign governments ===
==== France ====
The camps became an issue in the 2017 French presidential election, with Jean-Luc Mélenchon, Benoît Hamon and Emmanuel Macron condemning Chechnya for them, while François Fillon and Marine Le Pen remained silent. In a meeting with Putin in 2017, French President Macron pressed the Russian leader on the plight of LGBT Chechens and promised constant vigilance on the issue. According to Macron, Putin reported having taken steps to ascertain "the complete truth on the activities of local authorities".

==== United Kingdom ====
In 2017, British MEPs urged Prime Minister Theresa May and Foreign Secretary Boris Johnson to meet with the Russian ambassador. Johnson condemned the Chechen government's persecution of gay men as "outrageous" and "abhorrent."

In 2019, Foreign Office minister Alan Duncan said: "The persecution of LGBT people in Chechnya is utterly appalling. ...The Russian authorities must protect their people from these human rights abuses, and conduct a credible investigation into these reports immediately. There should be no climate of impunity for those who commit these abuses. We and the international community have repeatedly called for the Russian Government to conduct an investigation and hold those responsible for human rights abuses in Chechnya to account, including through the 2018 OSCE Moscow Mechanism."

==== Australia ====
In 2017, Julie Bishop, the Australian Foreign Minister, condemned both the arrests and the camps.

==== Canada ====
In April 2017, the Government of Canada called the "persecution of LGBTQ2 people in Chechnya reprehensible", calling upon Russia to investigate and ensure the safety of those at risk.

==== United States ====
In April 2017, the United States Department of State expressed concern about "numerous credible reports indicating the detentions and deaths of LGBTI individuals" in Chechnya. The same month, fifty members of Congress signed a letter urging Secretary of State Rex Tillerson, who was in Russia in April, to publicly question the validity of the reports and to pressure the Russian government to investigate and put a stop to the arrests. Also in April 2017, Nikki Haley, the U.S. ambassador to the United Nations, said, "We continue to be disturbed by reports of kidnapping, torture, and murder of people in Chechnya based on their sexual orientation and those persecuted by association. If true, this violation of human rights cannot be ignored – Chechen authorities must immediately investigate these allegations, hold anyone involved accountable, and take steps to prevent future abuses." Former Secretary of State and 2016 presidential candidate Hillary Clinton condemned the developments and called on the administration of President Donald Trump to do the same.

In June 2017, the U.S. House of Representatives unanimously passed House Resolution 351, which condemned the atrocities against LGBT people in Chechnya and called upon the Russian government to condemn the violence.

According to a National Security Council spokesperson, the topic of anti-gay persecution did not arise at a May 2017 meeting between Trump and Putin's Foreign Minister, Sergey Lavrov. A White House spokesperson said that she was "not 100 percent sure" whether Trump had been briefed on the issue. Testifying before a House of Representatives committee in June 2017, Tillerson reported that he had not discussed the matter during a meeting with Lavrov and did not know if Trump had raised it with Putin.

In December 2017, the U.S. Department of the Treasury imposed sanctions under the Magnitsky Act on Kadyrov and another Chechen official, Ayub Katayev, citing "gross violations of internationally recognized human rights"; the sanctions freeze assets and restrict the individuals' ability to travel in the U.S. A spokesman for Putin called the sanctions "illegal" and indicated that Moscow would enact similar restrictions on U.S. officials in response. In May 2019, the U.S. government imposed new financial sanctions on Chechen officials linked to the roundups of gay men in Chechnya, including Abuzayed Vismuradov, the commander of the "Terek Special Rapid Response Team" unit.

In 2018, the United States Department of State released the Country Reports on Human Rights Practices of 2017. The report on Russia detailed multiple human rights abuses against LGBTI people in Chechnya over the preceding year, including extrajudicial killings of LGBTI persons in Chechnya; the kidnapping, detention, and torture of men accused of being gay in Chechnya as part of a purge conducted by Chechen security forces; repeated threats of violence by Chechen officials against journalists reporting on human rights violations; and a failure of Chechen and Russian authorities to adequately redress human rights violations.

In January 2019, the U.S. Department of State called on Russia to urgently investigate the reports of the purges, with Deputy Spokesperson Robert Palladino stating: "We are deeply disturbed by credible reports out of Chechnya about renewed attacks against individuals perceived to be members of the LGBTI community. Civil society groups report that at least 40 individuals have been illegally detained since December, including two who reportedly died in custody after being tortured. We call on Russia to live up to its international obligations and commitments and its own constitution, and launch an immediate investigation into these human rights abuses."

==== Germany ====
German Chancellor Angela Merkel raised the topic in a meeting with Putin in May 2017, urging him to exert his influence to "ensure that minorities' rights are protected".

=== Multilateral efforts ===
In April 2017, Lilianne Ploumen, Dutch Minister for Foreign Trade and Development Cooperation, has called for a statement of condemnation from the 33 members (Argentina, Austria, Australia, Belgium, Canada, Chile, Costa Rica, the Czech Republic, Ecuador, Estonia, Finland, France, Germany, Greece, Honduras, Italy, Mexico, Montenegro, the Netherlands, New Zealand, Norway, Portugal, Serbia, Slovenia, South Africa, Spain, Sweden, Switzerland, Ukraine, the United Kingdom, the United States, and Uruguay) of the Equal Rights Coalition. In May 2017, in a joint letter to Russian Foreign Minister Sergey Lavrov, the foreign ministers of five European countries (Britain, France, Germany, the Netherlands and Sweden) declared their concern over the situation.

== Evacuations and asylum ==
The Russian LGBT Network, based in St. Petersburg, has worked to evacuate from Chechnya those who are threatened. By June 2017, the Russian LGBT Network reported that 42 men had been evacuated to other parts of Russia, where they were safe from the immediate threat of detention, but risked being tracked down.

In May 2017, Russian activists reported that survivors of Chechnya's anti-gay persecution were having difficulty finding countries willing to issue them visas. By mid-May 2017, nine survivors of the persecution had reportedly been granted visas—two by Lithuania, the others by countries that Lithuanian Foreign Minister Linas Linkevičius termed "allies" but declined to identify. Linkevičius urged other nations of the European Union to accept more of the refugees. As of June 2017, Germany and Lithuania had granted visas for entry to the countries based on 'humanitarian' grounds. In August 2017, the Dutch government changed policy to allow LGBT persons from Chechnya to gain almost automatic "asylum-seeker" status and entry to the Netherlands.

By 2019, the Russian LGBT Network had assisted more than 140 Chechen gay people in emigrating to European nations and Canada; none were resettled in the United States. The Toronto, Canada-based nonprofit Rainbow Railroad has worked with the Russian LGBT Network to establish safe routes out of the region and assist at-risk men in escaping. In mid-2017, the Canadian government had quietly granted asylum to 22 gay men and lesbians, in coordination with Rainbow Railroad. In December 2018, Canadian Minister of Foreign Affairs Chrystia Freeland ordered an airlift that brought 57 LGBT Chechen refugees to Canada.

The United States government offered only limited help to LGBT Chechens facing persecution. The Washington Post reported in September 2017 that "only a small number of LGBT Chechens who have found refuge in the United States in recent years"—far fewer than the number who wish to emigrate. In May 2017, the Russia LGBT Network reported having unproductive talks with American embassy officials, in which they were told there was "no political will" to issue U.S. visas to the refugees. The Human Rights Campaign, an LGBT rights group, has called upon the U.S. to accept Chechen LGBT asylum-seekers and refugees, noting that "activists state that the U.S. has yet to accept a single Chechen refugee and some Russian advocates have been told that U.S. visas are out of reach for LGBTQ Chechens." One Chechen transgender woman fled Russia in April 2016 after being harassed and assaulted; she traveled to Mexico and crossed the border into the United States, where a U.S. federal judge granted her asylum in August 2017 due to the dangerous situation for LGBT persons in Russia. In May 2019, one gay Chechen man had applied for asylum in the U.S., where he had fled in November 2018 after being attacked in Moscow.

== Documentary ==
The 2020 documentary Welcome to Chechnya by investigative reporter and filmmaker David France followed the work of activists rescuing survivors of torture in the anti-gay pogroms and features footage that was shot in secret, using hidden cameras, cell phones, GoPros, and handycams. To protect the identities of asylum seekers, deepfake technology was used to replace the faces and voices of subjects with face and voice doubles in a way that allowed viewers to see real faces displaying real emotions. One of the activists briefly discussed the expansion of persecution (on a smaller scale) to neighboring Ingushetia and Dagestan. The documentary had its world premiere at the Sundance Film Festival on January 26, 2020, and was released on June 30, 2020, by HBO Films.

== Persecution of LGBTQ+ women in Chechnya ==
There is a significant gap in visibility and reporting on human rights violations against LGBTQ+ women in Chechnya, as most sources focus on how homosexual men are specifically targeted by authorities. This gap is largely due to the fact that there is a lack of data collection about hate crimes toward LGBTQ+ women in Russia. Systemic homophobia, transphobia, and hate crimes are rarely addressed as systemic. Women in Chechnya are multiply oppressed. They experience the intersecting oppressions of sexism, homophobia/transphobia, limitations on their rights and freedoms in a hyper-religious, militaristic republic, and the fact that they are considered as “belonging” to the family. Discrimination and violence toward LGBTQ+ women in Chechnya takes many forms. LGBTQ+ women are less likely to be criminalized, but are subjected to more social monitoring and surveillance. LGBTQ+ women face stigma about appearing in public, and many aspects of their lives, including their appearance, clothing, and communication (in person and online), are often controlled and/or monitored by their family.

If their sexuality is found out, LGBTQ+ women face the threat of being outed by family/friends. The consequences of being outed are often “beatings, isolation, and humiliation”, as well as forced marriage. Forced marriage leaves LGBTQ+ women vulnerable to physical, emotional, and sexual abuse by their spouse. Another common practice is conversion therapy, usually through religious or medical treatment focused on “correcting” homosexuality. LGBTQ+ women in Chechnya describe being sent to compulsory treatment at the Center for Islamic Medicine. The emphasis on “correcting” homosexuality speaks to the influence of medicalization of queerness on Chechen society. One religious ritual that several LGBTQ+ women described being subjected to were exorcism-like practices focused on the “expulsion of the jinn”. The jinn is a supernatural being in Islamic mythology, and it is believed that the "expulsion of the jinn" from LGBTQ+ women will purify them, and erase their same-sex desires.

LGBTQ+ women in Chechnya also face physical violence, usually at the hands of their family members. Honor killing of LGBTQ+ women is common in Chechnya. The “honor” and “purity” of the family or kinship clan (tiep) is highly valued as a collective responsibility for the family and important for preserving the honor of the nation. In Chechnya, humiliation and shame, both of the individual and the family, are used as weapons in both private and public spaces. This means that, often, anyone who brings shame upon the family or violates social norms faces punishment by means of physical violence and/or honor killing. This issue is further complicated by the lack of anti-discrimination legislation in the Russian Federation, as well as the fact that domestic violence is not recognized as a separate offense from assault in Russia. Additionally, honor killings are not mentioned in law, which leads to “issues of violence against LBT women [being] solved outside the framework of the law”. Most LGBTQ+ women in Chechnya do not feel safe coming forward with stories of violence and discrimination because Chechen authorities have often been complicit in such violence. In many cases, LGBTQ+ women in Chechnya reported that authorities encouraged honor killing or sided with their abusers. Additionally, coming forward would mean that the victim’s sexuality would be visible, which could put the victim in even more danger.

Because "physical violence and sexual violence cannot exist without psychological violence", LGBTQ+ women in Chechnya experience severe, negative mental health outcomes. According to a study of violence toward LGBTQ+ women in the Northern Caucasus of Russia, LGBTQ+ women report feelings of "hopelessness" and "fear" and show signs of depression and PTSD. The study also found that the high levels of internalized homophobia and transphobia present among LGBTQ+ women in Chechnya contribute to their negative mental health outcomes.

As a result of their persecution in Chechnya, LGBTQ+ women develop survival strategies including imitating the behaviors of cisgender and heterosexual women, marrying a gay man, or attempting to escape or leave Chechnya, even temporarily. For those LGBTQ+ women who manage to escape, many encounter issues of economic freedom, leading them either into poverty or back to their family in Chechnya.

== Ramzan Kadyrov and the Russian Federation's complicity ==
The actions of the Russian Federation have laid the foundation for anti-LGBT attitudes, discrimination, and violence to become so widespread in Chechnya. The Russian Federation's continued support of Chechnya and Ramzan Kadyrov demonstrates a tolerance of the abuse of LGBT people perpetuated by authorities in Chechnya. In fact, Russian authorities deny the persecution of LGBT people in Chechnya. Ramzan Kadyrov was personally appointed by Vladimir Putin, so “Kadyrov’s reign is conditioned on the Kremlin’s tolerance” as well as Kadyrov’s loyalty to the Russian Federation.

The Russian Federation frames itself as a protector of “traditional”, conservative values, and has passed legislation such as the federal ban on “propaganda of non-traditional sexual relations”, which was expanded in 2022 to further limit the rights of LGBT people in the Federation. Chechnya has strongly implemented such laws. The Russian Federation constructs Chechnya as an “other”, more “primitive” society, which normalizes the violence that LGBTQ+ Chechens face. Human rights abuses in Chechnya are either completely denied or passed off as normal by the Russian Federation because of the association of violence with Chechen society. Masculinity is also associated with and normalizes violence in Chechnya because of the way that Russian and Chechen officials employ masculinity as a showcase of the region’s militaristic power.

Gender and gender norms in Chechnya are defined in the context of a hyper-militaristic nation, so those who are perceived to transgress these norms are seen as a threat to the nation, justifying the involvement of Chechen authorities in enforcing gender norms. Chechen authorities “receive assistance from Russian law enforcement agencies in various regions” and in some cases, Russian authorities take part in the human rights abuses of LGBTQ+ people in Chechnya. According to a report submitted to the UN by several crisis groups, nonprofits, and human rights organizations, “In 2023, five homosexual men were detained in Chechnya due to their sexual orientation. After enduring beatings and cruel treatment, they were coerced into signing military contracts and were forcibly sent to fight in Ukraine”. Additionally, in 2024, the Supreme Court of the Russian Federation ruled that the "International LGBT Public Movement" is an extremist organization, and demanded that any organizations supporting LGBTQ+ rights in Russia be disbanded. There are also reports of attempts of Russian authorities “to create a database of LGBT+ people” in 2024 and 2025. In many cases of abduction of LGBTQ+ people by Chechen authorities, “the police force and the military personnel were looking for specific people”. Personal searches, including searching one’s phone, by Chechen authorities are common and justified as a means to prevent drug and terrorism-related offenses, but these searches are also used to name and locate LGBTQ+ people in Chechnya.

These human rights abuses in Chechnya are reported by several victims to have been "supervised by the Spokesperson of the Chechen Parliament Magomed Daudov, the Head of the Chechen Department of the Ministry of Domestic Affairs in Argun Aiub Kataev, and the Commander of The Special Division of First Responders 'Terek' Abuzaid Vismurado". In many cases, victims of Chechen authorities described that law enforcement encouraged their families to kill them in an act of honor killing.

The actions of the Russian Federation to limit the rights of LGBTQ+ people in the country have laid the foundation for these human rights abuses in Chechnya: "President Ramzan Kadyrov did not gain power in a vacuum". The Russian Federation is complicit in these human rights abuses, as "these crimes were both systematic and institutionalized by the state".

== See also ==
- History of Chechnya
- LGBT in Islam
- LGBT rights in Russia
- List of concentration and internment camps § After the 1990s
- Violence against LGBT people
- Zelim Bakaev
