= EQUAL PostOst =

EQUAL PostOst (European Queer Alliance of PostOst Community, abbreviated as EQUAL PostOst e.V.) is a European human rights organization focused on supporting the LGBTQ+ community in post-Soviet countries, primarily Russia. The organization provides legal and psychological assistance and facilitates the evacuation of individuals persecuted based on their sexual orientation or gender identity.

== History ==
EQUAL PostOst was founded by human rights activist Evelina Chayka, who has lived in Berlin for over 19 years and previously participated in the "Strategy-31" protests in Saint Petersburg. The organization emerged in response to escalating repressions against LGBTQ+ individuals in Russia, particularly following the Russian Supreme Court's November 2023 decision to designate the "international public LGBT movement" as extremist. Chayka co-founded the "International Public LGBT Movement" to participate in the court case to defend the community's interests. Other co-founders include human rights activist Igor Kochetkov, Olga Baranova, Renat Davletgildeev, and Yaroslav Rasputin. After the ban took effect in January 2024, EQUAL PostOst reported a surge in requests—up to 12 per hour, primarily for evacuation assistance. The organization operates clandestinely in Russia, providing emergency aid, including dispatching lawyers to secure the release of detained individuals.

== Activities ==
EQUAL PostOst focuses on evacuating LGBTQ+ individuals from Russia, particularly transgender and non-binary people, amid transphobic legislation. It offers guidance on visas, asylum applications, and relocation programs (e.g., Social Year, Freelancer Visa, Au Pair) and advocates in Europe for expanded humanitarian programs for vulnerable groups. Over six months, the organization handled approximately 20 cases, achieving six successful evacuations, primarily from the North Caucasus. In 2024, EQUAL PostOst prevented the deportation of a Russian lesbian named Anna from Germany to Russia by intercepting her in Morocco and arranging her transfer to a third country. The organization collaborates with the Anti-War Committee of Russia, North Caucasus SOS, and other groups to provide psychological support and shelter placements. Evelina Chayka has stated that the persecution of LGBTQ+ individuals in Russia resembles genocide, involving prison torture, denunciations, and censorship. The organization also opposes the rise of anti-LGBTQ+ narratives in Europe.

== Exhibitions ==
- No Such People Here (2023, Berlin, PrideArt Gallery): Documents the persecution of LGBTQ+ individuals in the North Caucasus through victims' personal items (slippers, drawings, photos of torture tools). Curated by Anna Narinskaya. Organized by EQUAL PostOst and SK SOS. Held in a former women's prison; Chayka received threats after the opening.
- Boxed (2025, Berlin, Kunstquartier Bethanien): Seven thematic boxes addressing violence (prison, torture, denunciations, transphobia). Includes artifacts (suffocation pillow, knives) and a montage from the 1990s. Curated by Anna Narinskaya.
