= David Isteev =

Russian LGBT rights defender and crisis manager

- Давид Истеев
- Citizenship: Russian
- Occupation: Human rights activist
- Years active: 2017–present
- Known for: Founder of North Caucasus SOS Crisis Group; featured activist in Welcome to Chechnya
- Awards: Teddy Activist Award (2020); IDA Courage Under Fire Award (2020); Rainbow Prize, Sweden (2024)

David Isteev (Russian: Давид Истеев) is a Russian LGBT rights defender and human rights activist.

== Early life and education ==
Isteev came to human rights and activist work through earlier work in journalism.

== Career ==
=== Russian LGBT Network ===
In 2017, Isteev began working with the Russian LGBT Network to help setup a program for transgender Russians. He served as coordinator and head of emergency assistance there , and operated a secret Moscow shelter and hotline for at-risk LGBT people fleeing from Chechnya. By 2019, the program had evacuated approximately 150 people from Chechnya.

=== Welcome to Chechnya ===
The 2020 HBO documentary Welcome to Chechnya, directed by David France, featured the activist work of Isteev. The film premiered at Sundance Film Festival in January 2020, and internationally at the 70th Berlin International Film Festival where he won the Teddy Award alongside activists Olga Baranova and Maxim Lapunov. It later won a 2021 Peabody award for filmmaking.

=== North Caucasus SOS Crisis Group ===
In October 2021, North Caucasus SOS was founded in October 2021 by members of the Russian LGBT Network. David Isteev became the director of NC SOS.

NC SOS focuses on evacuation of persecuted LGBT people fleeing Chechnya by providing safe housing, legal, financial, medical, and psychological assistance.

In 2022, Isteev reported on seven gay men that were detained in Chechnya and forcibly sent to fight in Ukraine, with at least one deceased.

In October 2024, isteev spoke at Columbia University Harriman Institute symposium on "The Crime of Being Gay: The Stories of LGBTQ+ People Persecuted in the Russian North Caucasus".

As of 2025, NC SOS and its predecessor have reported assisting 925 people.

In 2025, Isteev reported that 20% of the NC SOS team was still operating in Russia, with enormous risks.

== Legal Issues ==
Isteev had regularly received threats since working as an LGBT activist in Russia. In May 2019, several men raided the home of a volunteer in Saint Petersburg, interrogating them about information about Isteev, and issuing threats against him. Four claimed to be police from Grozny but did not provide identification.

In May 2023, The Russian Ministry of Justice included the North Caucasus SOS into the register of foreign agents for promoting LGBT relations. The group said that the designation would complicate their work aiding victims of persecution in Chechnya.

== Personal life ==
As of 2025, Isteev works in exile from Russia.

== Awards ==
In 2020, Isteev, fellow activist Olga Baranova, and filmmaker David France were presented the International Documentary Association Courage Under Fire Award.

In 2024, David Isteev and project manager Lucy Shtein accepted the Rainbow Prize on behalf of North Caucasus SOS, presented by Princess Christina of Sweden at the Rainbow Gala in Stockholm.
