= North Caucasus SOS =

- Северный Кавказ SOS
- Abbreviation: NC SOS
- Founder: David Isteev
- Type: Nonprofit
- Website: https://ncsos.io

North Caucasus SOS Crisis Group (abbr. NC SOS, Russian: Кризисная группа СК SOS, romanized: Krizisnaya gruppa SK SOS) is a Russian organization that helps LGBTQ+ people and their families who are facing mortal danger in the North Caucasus, Russia. As of 2025, NC SOS and its predecessor have reported assisting 925 people.

== History ==
The organization North Caucasus SOS was formally founded in October 2021 by human rights defenders and activists of the Russian LGBT Network who have been helping LGBT people in the North Caucasus since 2017, when mass persecution of LGBT people in Chechnya became known. David Isteev, who previously headed the emergency assistance department of the Russian LGBT Network, became the director of NC SOS.

Initially, NC SOS worked as part of the charitable foundation "Sphere" (Russian: "Сфера"), until its liquidation by the Russian Ministry of Justice in April 2022.

In May 2023, the Russian Ministry of Justice added NC SOS to the register of "foreign agents". Formally, designation was linked to the case of Idris Arsamikov (Russian: Идрис Арсамиков).

In April 2024, Roskomnadzor blocked access to the NC SOS website in Russia. Human rights activists suggest that this could be due to the new law prohibiting "LGBT propaganda", which allowed blocking of LGBT-related content without a court order.

== Activity ==
The organization helps LGBT people to leave regions where they have faced discrimination, violence and mortal danger. NC SOS also facilitates migration, provides safe housing, offers legal, financial, medical, and psychological support. The organization primarily works with applicants from Chechnya, Ingushetia, and Dagestan.

NC SOS cooperates with the volunteer group "Marem" (Russian: "Марем"), which helps women who have been victims of domestic violence in the North Caucasus, the LGBT emergency assistance group "Aegis" (Russian: "Эгида"), and other human rights organizations.

NC SOS, and predecessor Russian LGBT Network, have assisted in numerous high-profile cases since 2017.

=== 2017 ===
In 2017, Maxim Lapunov spoke for the first time about the torture in a secret prison for gays in Grozny; he spent about two weeks in one of them.

=== 2020 ===
In 2020, Aminat Lorsanova was subjected to conversion therapy by her family in Chechnya, was held in a psychiatric hospital, was tortured and "treated" by reading the Quran. She escaped with the support of NC SOS.

=== 2022 ===
In 2022, Siblings Salekh Magamadov and Ismail Isaev were abducted by Chechen security forces from a crisis apartment of NC SOS in Nizhny Novgorod due to their homosexuality and opposition views, subjected to beatings and torture. They were sentenced to 8 and 6 years in prison in an unsubstantiated criminal case.

In 2022, Sisters Khadizhat and Patimat Khizriev, Aminat Gazimagomedova and Patimat Magomedova escaped from domestic violence from Dagestan to Georgia with help of NC SOS. During сrossing of the border checkpoint Verkhny Lars, Russian border guards held them for more than 11 hours.

=== 2023 ===
Elina Ukhmanova was forcibly detained in Makhachkala, subjected to conversion therapy in an attempt to "cure" her of bisexuality and atheism, left Dagestan with help of NC SOS.

Idris Arsamikov was tortured in Chechnya because of his homosexuality. With help of NC SOS, he left Russia and received international protection in the Netherlands. However, he returned for his father's funeral, was detained at Moscow Domodedovo Airport and handed over to Chechen security forces.

=== 2024 ===
Seda Suleymanova fled from relatives in Chechnya with support of NC SOS because she refused to marry. But a year later she was detained by Chechen security forces in Saint Petersburg with assistance of the local police, and sent to Chechnya. Where, according to sources in the republic, she became the victim of "honor killing." The Investigative Committee of Russia opened a criminal investigation into Suleimanova's "disappearance without a trace," but the results of the investigation were not provided.

Liya Zaurbekova escaped from domestic violence from Chechnya to Moscow. Her relatives reported her missing and attempted to kidnap from the Nagatino-Sadovniki police department. With support of the Marem group and assistance of NC SOS, she was able to leave Russia.

NC SOS provides help to people who were assisted in leaving the region and those who were granted asylum.

In September 2024, NC SOS published a report claiming that Security forces in Chechnya are forcing detained homosexual men to Ukraine by blackmailing them into volunteering for the frontlines. They cited seven incidents of this, beginning prior to Sep 2022 mobilizations. Men were detained for being homosexual, and then given the choice of paying a ransom or volunteering for the war in Ukraine. The Akhmat unit was using the mobilized queer men as sex slaves, according to David Isteev.

=== 2025 ===
On Nov 9, 2025 Aliya Ozdamirova, the daughter of a former Chechen deputy sports minister the day after returning to Chechnya. She had sent a message to NC SOS prior to her return stating "My life is in danger. If something happens to me, I want people to know what happened." Her family and North Caucasus officials stated that she died of natural causes, but NC SOS claims it was an honor killing.

== Awards ==
In 2024, NC SOS was awarded the Rainbow Prize, worth 100,000 SEK, presented by Princess Christina of Sweden at the Rainbow Gala in Stockholm. David Isteev and project manager Lucy Shtein accepted the award on behalf of the organisation.
