= Marem (organisation) =

Russian women's rights organization

Marem is a women's rights organisation operating primarily in the North Caucasus region of Russia, focusing on Dagestan, Chechnya, and Ingushetia. Founded in June 2020, it provides legal, psychological, and logistical assistance to women fleeing domestic violence, gender-based violence, forced marriages, and other forms of familial abuse.

== History ==
Marem was co-founded in June 2020 by journalist and activist Svetlana Anokhina, Dagestani blogger Maryam Aliyeva, and other women activists. The group is named after Marem Alieva, a woman from Ingushetia. In 1994, when she was 16 years old, she was kidnapped for marriage by Mukharbek Evloev, a 36-year-old man. Evloev abused her physically and psychologically; she escaped multiple times, but was pressured to return. In July 2015, she fled with her children, but disappeared on 19 September 2015, believed to have been murdered, though no body was found and no criminal case opened. Her case was examined by the European Court of Human Rights in 2019.

The group was established to address the lack of support for victims of domestic violence in the region (exacerbated by the 2017 decriminalisation of most forms of domestic violence in Russia in the first instance). The group also challenges cultural norms in Muslim-majority republics that often isolate victims and limit intervention by authorities.

Marem activists face death threats, harassment, police raids, and regional opposition from authorities and religious figures who view the group as interfering in family affairs. Anokhina faced death threats and fled Dagestan, eventually leaving Russia entirely in 2021 after a police raid on a Marem-operated shelter in Makhachkala. Despite this, she continued to lead Marem remotely. Marem continues its work through digital channels like Telegram and WhatsApp.

In January 2026, a court in Makhachkala sentenced Anokhina in absentia to five years in prison for allegedly spreading "fake news" about the Russian armed forces via social media posts in 2022 related to the Russian invasion of Ukraine.

== Activities ==
Marem assists women facing domestic violence, death threats, forced returns to abusive families, conversion therapy, and related issues. Services include legal aid, psychological support, travel, accommodation, and help with asylum or relocation paperwork. Marem collaborates with organisations like North Caucasus SOS.

The organisation operates with a team of about twelve women volunteers, including responders, lawyers, and psychologists. It has helped evacuate and support hundreds of women since 2020, including over 50 evacuations reported by 2022.

Marem also supports LGBTQ+ individuals facing persecution in the region.

Marem has highlighted tactics used by authorities and families to prevent women from escaping, such as falsely accusing them of theft to justify detention and forced returns.

== Notable cases ==
In June 2021, 22-year-old Chechen woman Khalimat Taramova fled domestic abuse and conversion therapy in Chechnya and sought refuge at Marem's shelter in Makhachkala, Dagestan. On 10 June, Dagestani and Chechen police raided the shelter, detained activists and forcibly returned Taramova to Chechnya, where she later appeared on state television claiming she was safe; activists alleged the statement was coerced. The activists were released the next day after charges were dropped. In 2024, a court awarded 15,000 rubles each to Svetlana Anokhina, Maysarat Kilyaskhanova, and Ekaterina Neroznikova for injuries sustained during the raid, but the court of cassation in Pyatigorsk overturned the decision in 2025.

In June 2023, Selima Ismailova was detained at Vnukovo International Airport in Moscow, on charges of theft. She was detained while trying to leave Chechnya, and Marem supported her defence. In May 2024, Liya Zaurbekova fled alleged abuse in Chechnya; Marem co-ordinated her escape amid efforts by relatives and officials, including Adam Delimkhanov, to locate her. In August 2024, Dagestani teenager Aishat Magomedova was abducted from her Moscow apartment by relatives and forcibly returned to Dagestan after fleeing family violence; Marem criticised police inaction, citing deference to cultural customs.

In 2022, Chechen woman Seda Suleymanova fled to Saint Petersburg; in August 2023 she disappeared from a police station following a theft complaint filed by relatives. Although she later appeared in a video claiming she was safe, friends reported inconsistencies, and her whereabouts are unknown. In July 2025, Laura Avtorkhanova was detained in Tbilisi, Georgia, after relatives reported her missing, and Marem assisted her following her release. The organisation also described the 2025 killing of Aishat Baimuradova, a relative of Ramzan Kadyrov, in Armenia, after she fled abuse.

In January 2026, Marem co-ordinator Katerina Neroznikova highlighted discrimination against divorced mothers in Ingushetia, including denial of access to children, as part of a broader campaign for mothers' rights.

== See also ==
- Domestic violence in Russia
- Human rights in Russia
