= Svetlana Anokhina =

Russian human rights activist and journalist

- Born: August 8, 1962 (age 64); Makhachkala, Dagestan, Russia
- Occupations: Journalist, human rights defender, founder of ‘Marem’ initiative

Svetlana Anatolyevna Anokhina (Russian: Светлана Анатольевна Анохина; born 8 August 1962) is one of the most prominent human rights defenders in Daghestan. She is a journalist, an advocate of women's rights and a co-founder of Marem crisis group.

== Life ==
Anokhina was born in Makhachkala.

In her own words, she entered journalism at the age of 38. Soon she became an editor-in-chief of Daptar, the only North Caucasian online media writing on women's rights. In her articles, Anokhina exposed multiple violent practices against women in the North Caucasus, such as domestic abuse, forced marriages, full control by male relatives, female circumcision, etc.

In July 2020, she co-founded Marem, an NGO and a crisis group for victims of gender-based abuse. Marem helps victims of domestic violence from Dagestan, Chechnya and other North Caucasus republics to evacuate from the country and find shelter. Marem also provides legal and psychological support to victims. The organization was named in honour of Marem Alieva, a woman from Ingushetia who disappeared in 2015. A victim of physical and psychological abuse from her husband, she managed to escape with the help of local human rights activists, but returned home when she was told that her husband had sworn on the Quran not to hit her again. She disappeared the day after her return, after calling her sister and saying that a group of men were approaching her house. Bloodstained hair and a rope were found inside. In 2019, the European Court of Human Rights examined the case, the first such case of domestic abuse the court had investigated.

On June 10, 2021, Chechen and Dagestani law enforcers raided and destroyed Marem shelter. Anokhina and her colleague, Maysarat Kilyaskhanova, were beaten and detained for three days. In 2021, Anokhina left Russia due to multiple death threats.

In April 2023, a criminal case was opened against her for an alleged "public dissemination of deliberately false information about the use of the Russian Armed Forces." On 19 January 2026, a court in Makhachkala sentenced her to five years in prison; the trial happened in absentia.

In 2024, BBC included her into its list of 100 inspiring and influential women.
