= Welcome to Chechnya =

2020 documentary about the anti-LGBT purges in Chechnya

- Official poster
- Directed by: David France
- Written by: David France; Tyler H. Walk
- Produced by: David France; Alice Henty; Askold Kurov; Joy A. Tomchin
- Cinematography: Askold Kurov; Derek Wiesehahn
- Edited by: Tyler H. Walk
- Music by: Evgueni Galperine; Sacha Galperine
- Production companies: Public Square Films; HBO Documentary Films; Ninety Thousand Words; Maylo Films; BBC Storyville
- Distributed by: HBO Films
- Release dates: January 26, 2020 (Sundance); June 30, 2020 (United States)
- Running time: 107 minutes
- Country: United States
- Languages: English; Russian; Chechen

Welcome to Chechnya (Russian: Добро пожаловать в Чечню, romanized: Dobro pozhalovat' v Chechnyu) is a 2020 documentary film by American reporter, author and documentarian David France. The film centers on the anti-gay purges in Chechnya of the late 2010s, filming LGBT Chechen refugees using hidden cameras as they made their way out of Russia through a network of safehouses aided by activists.

It had its world premiere at the Sundance Film Festival on January 26, 2020 and was released on June 30, 2020, by HBO Films.

== Production ==
The film follows the work of activists rescuing survivors of torture in Chechnya. To avoid exposing their work, it was shot in secret, using hidden cameras, cell phones, GoPros, and handycams.

Further complicating the production of the film was the need to protect the identities of interviewees. France wanted to put a real human face on the story, so conventional techniques of disguising one's appearance, such as blurring their faces, filming them in darkness or hiring actors to stage re-enactments were not enough. Eventually he opted for advanced facial replacement techniques using artificial intelligence and novel visual effects technology so the viewer could see real faces displaying real emotions while still protecting the identities of the speakers. The approach is a "game changer in identity protection", according to Documentary Magazine, and a brand new tool for documentary filmmakers. To protect the identities of the interviewees, they could not move the footage across the internet nor work on it in an open studio setting. Instead, they edited the film in a windowless room in order to keep with security protocols.

One of the refugees, Maxim Lapunov, is publicly identified in the film, as he sought, and failed, to get legal redress from Russian authorities.

The mysterious disappearance of gay Chechen singer Zelim Bakaev after a visit to Grozny for his sister's wedding in August 2017 also receives a brief mention in the film.

== Release ==
The film premiered at the 2020 Sundance Film Festival, and screened at the 70th Berlin International Film Festival. It was released on June 30, 2020 by HBO Films.

It was shown at the Adelaide Film Festival in October 2020.

== Reception ==
The film received universal critical acclaim, holding an approval rating of 100% on Rotten Tomatoes based on 72 reviews, with an average rating of 8.7/10. The website's critics consensus reads: "An illuminating and urgent call to action, Welcome to Chechnya portrays the horrors of the mass persecution of the LGBTQ+ community in the Chechen Republic with tenacity and tenderness." Metacritic, which uses a weighted average, assigned the film a score of 86 out of 100 based on 17 critics, indicating "universal acclaim".

=== Accolades ===
Award	Date of ceremony	Category	Recipient(s)	Result	Ref.
Sundance Film Festival	February 1, 2020	U.S. Documentary Special Jury Award for Editing	Tyler H. Walk	Won	
Sundance Film Festival	February 1, 2020	U.S. Documentary Competition Grand Jury Prize	David France	Nominated	
Berlin International Film Festival	February 28, 2020	Teddy Activist Award	David Isteev, Olga Baranova, Maxim Lapunov	Won	
Berlin International Film Festival	March 1, 2020	Panorama Publikumspreis (audience award) for Best Documentary	David France	Won	
Ljubljana LGBT Film Festival	December 20, 2020	Pink Dragon Audience Award	Welcome to Chechnya	Won	
GLAAD Media Awards	April 8, 2021	Outstanding Documentary	Welcome to Chechnya	Nominated	
Visual Effects Society Awards	April 6, 2021	Outstanding Supporting Visual Effects in a Photoreal Feature	Ryan Laney, Eugen Bräunig, Maxwell Anderson, Johnny Han and Piers Dennis	Nominated	
Directors Guild of America Awards	April 10, 2021	Outstanding Directional Achievement in Documentary	David France	Nominated	
British Academy Television Awards	June 6, 2021	Best International Programme	David France, Alice Henty, Askold Kurov and Joy A Tomchin	Won	
Hollywood Critics Association	August 29, 2021	Best Broadcast Network or Cable Docuseries, Documentary Television Movie, or Non-Fiction Series	Welcome to Chechnya	Won	
Primetime Emmy Awards	September 18, 2021	Exceptional Merit in Documentary Filmmaking	Alice Henty, David France, Joy A. Tomchin, Askold Kurov and Igor Myakotin	Nominated	
Cinema for Peace awards	February 24, 2023	The Most Valuable Documentary of the Year	Welcome to Chechnya	Won	
