= LGBTQ rights in Chechnya =

Human rights in Russian territory

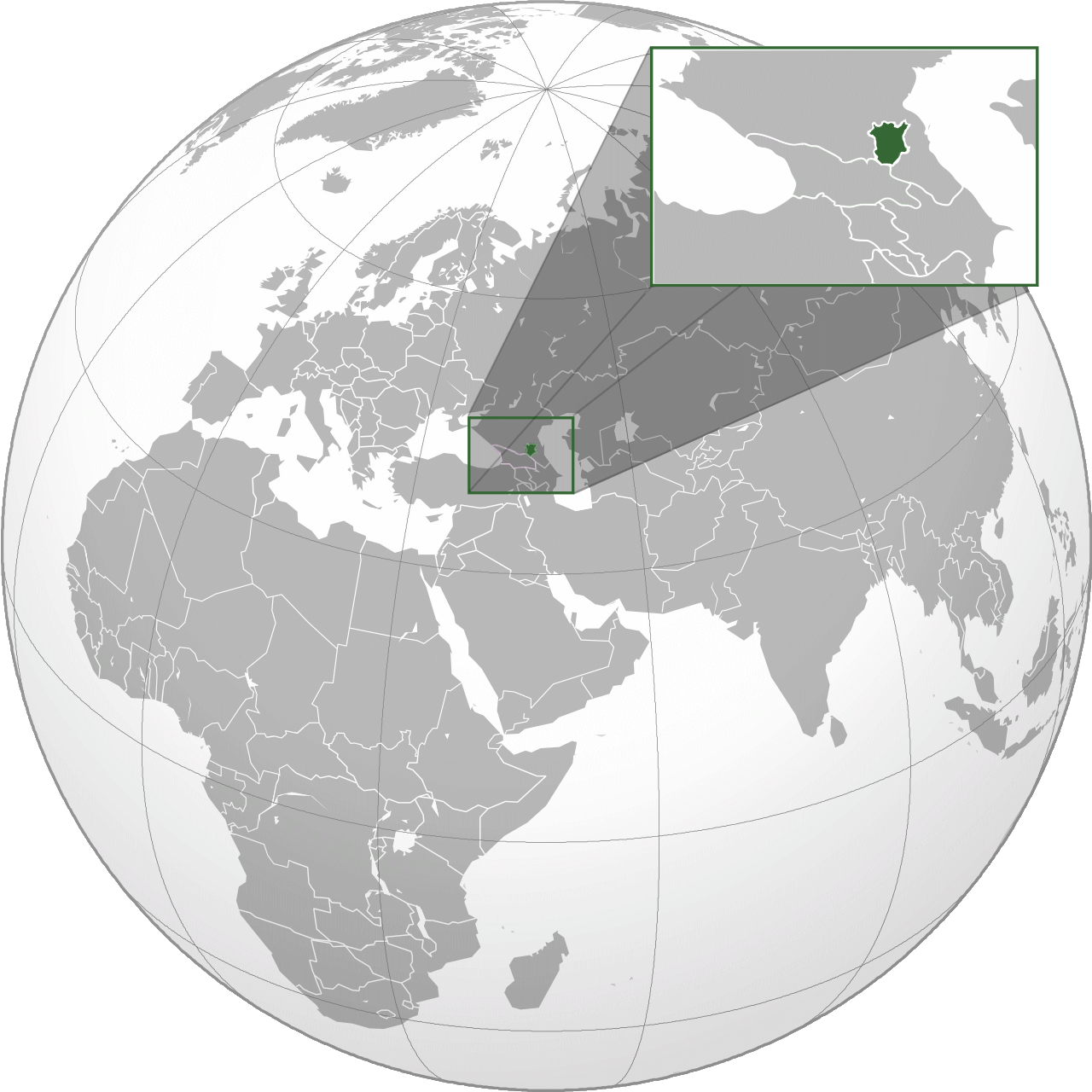
- Location of Chechnya (dark green)
- Legal status: Homosexuality de facto illegal
- Penalty: Includes corporal punishment, imprisonment, torture, capital punishment
- Discrimination protections: None

Family rights
- Recognition of relationships: No recognition of same-sex relationships

The rights situation of lesbian, gay, bisexual and transgender people in Chechnya has long been a cause for concern for human rights organizations such as Amnesty International and Human Rights Watch. As a member of the Russian Federation, Russia's LGBT laws formally apply. De facto, there are no protections for LGBT citizens, and the Chechen authorities allegedly encourage the killing of people suspected of homosexuality by their families.

Since March 2017, a violent crackdown on the LGBT community led to the abduction and detention of gay and bisexual men, who were beaten and tortured. More than one hundred men (possibly several hundred) were targeted. At least three, and reportedly as many as 20, were beaten to death. The precise number of those detained and killed is unknown. A panel of expert advisors to the United Nations Human Rights Council reported in early April 2017 that: "These are acts of persecution and violence on an unprecedented scale in the region and constitute serious violations of the obligations of the Russian Federation under international human rights law."

== Cultural aspects ==
Chechnya is a highly conservative Islamic society in which homophobia is widespread and homosexuality is taboo. Following two separatist armed conflicts in the 1990s—the First Chechen War and the Second Chechen War—Chechnya "became increasingly conservative" under the leadership of President Akhmad Kadyrov and his son Ramzan Kadyrov, who is the head of the Chechen Republic. In Chechnya, as in other southern Russia regions, Russian President Vladimir Putin "has empowered local leaders to enforce their interpretation of traditional Muslim values." Human Rights Watch reported in 2017 that "[i]t is difficult to overstate just how vulnerable LGBT people are in Chechnya, where homophobia is intense and rampant. LGBT people are in danger not only of persecution by the authorities but also of falling victim to 'honour killings' by their own relatives for tarnishing family honor." An activist for the Russian LGBT Network stated that people are sometimes released from prisons due to the authorities knowing that they will be killed by their families. Kadyrov has even argued that there are no gay people in Chechnya and that even if there are any, then "take them to Canada, praise Allah, to cleanse the blood".

== Legal status ==
LGBTQ rights in Russia
- Legal status: Same-sex sexual activity legal since 1917, criminalized in 1934 (except for women) and decriminalized again since 1993. (Note: Russian Criminal Enforcement Code designates "buggery" and "lesbianism" as "egregious breach of prison order".) "Promotion" of LGBTQ identity illegal since 2013 (to minors) and 2022 (to adults). Public expression of LGBTQ identity banned since 2023
- Gender identity: Gender change legal between 1997 and 2023, illegal afterwards
- Military: Yes
- Discrimination protections: None

Family rights
- Recognition of relationships: No recognition of same-sex unions
- Restrictions: Same-sex marriage constitutionally banned since 2020 (Note: In the 2020 amendments to the Constitution of Russia, marriage is defined as being between a man and woman, thereby banning same-sex marriage.)
- Adoption: No

Homosexuality was first made illegal in Chechnya after Russia conquered it in the late 1800s. After the October Revolution, all of Russia legalized homosexuality again, but it was re-criminalized under Joseph Stalin for the whole Soviet Union. Homosexuality was relegalized in Russia once more in 1993, although between 1991 and 2000 Chechnya was de facto independent from Russia. In 1999, as a concession to radical Islamists, Chechen president Aslan Maskhadov introduced sharia law. The sharia courts that were established sentenced people to death for crimes such as adultery and homosexuality.

Current Russian-backed leader Ramzan Kadyrov "has brought Islam to the fore of Chechnya's daily life, and gay people who reveal their sexuality are often discriminated against and shunned by their families." Ramzan Kadyrov began his "virtue campaign" social policy while he was still prime minister, in 2006, attacking first the "immorality" of the Republic's young women and introducing the policy of encouragement for honor killings, with Kadyrov's perceived role as the defender of "traditional" gender roles ultimately extending to the anti-LGBT campaign.

Although many Chechens, especially Chechens who live in more urban areas, anonymously continue to inform news agencies that they privately oppose Kadyrov's social policies on matters such as forced reunions of divorcees and the new pressures to wear the hijab (which clashes with the traditional Chechen code on female attire, which stipulated that women should wear a narrow headband rather than a full hair-concealing hijab) and the "raising of a whole generation of religious extremists", dissent puts an individual and their family in immediate danger. In education as well as in other aspects of people's lives, state-run organizations have used their resources to disseminate propaganda which promotes Kadyrov's Islamization campaign; women who are perceived as being "immodestly" dressed are attacked with paintballs, and young schoolboys are informed that if they allow their sisters to go out without covering their hair, they will face eternal damnation, and they are also encouraged to report their parents to the authorities so the authorities will be able to determine if their parents are sufficiently or insufficiently practicing Islam at home. Although Kadyrov's imposition of Islamic law contradicts wider Russian Federation law as well as an article of the Chechnyan constitution which explicitly states that Chechnya is secular and no religion can be made official or mandatory, he does so with the monetary and political support of Putin, for which Russia has come under criticism by human rights groups.

Russia officially passed an anti-gay propaganda law in June 2013. It officially bans the distribution of "propaganda for nontraditional sexual relationships", among children. The law has been criticized by several human rights groups, including Human Rights Watch, because they consider it "openly discriminatory" against the LGBT population and has been cited as one of the reasons that the Kremlin has not responded fast enough to the persecution of gay people in Chechnya.

== Anti-gay persecution in 2017 and 2019 ==
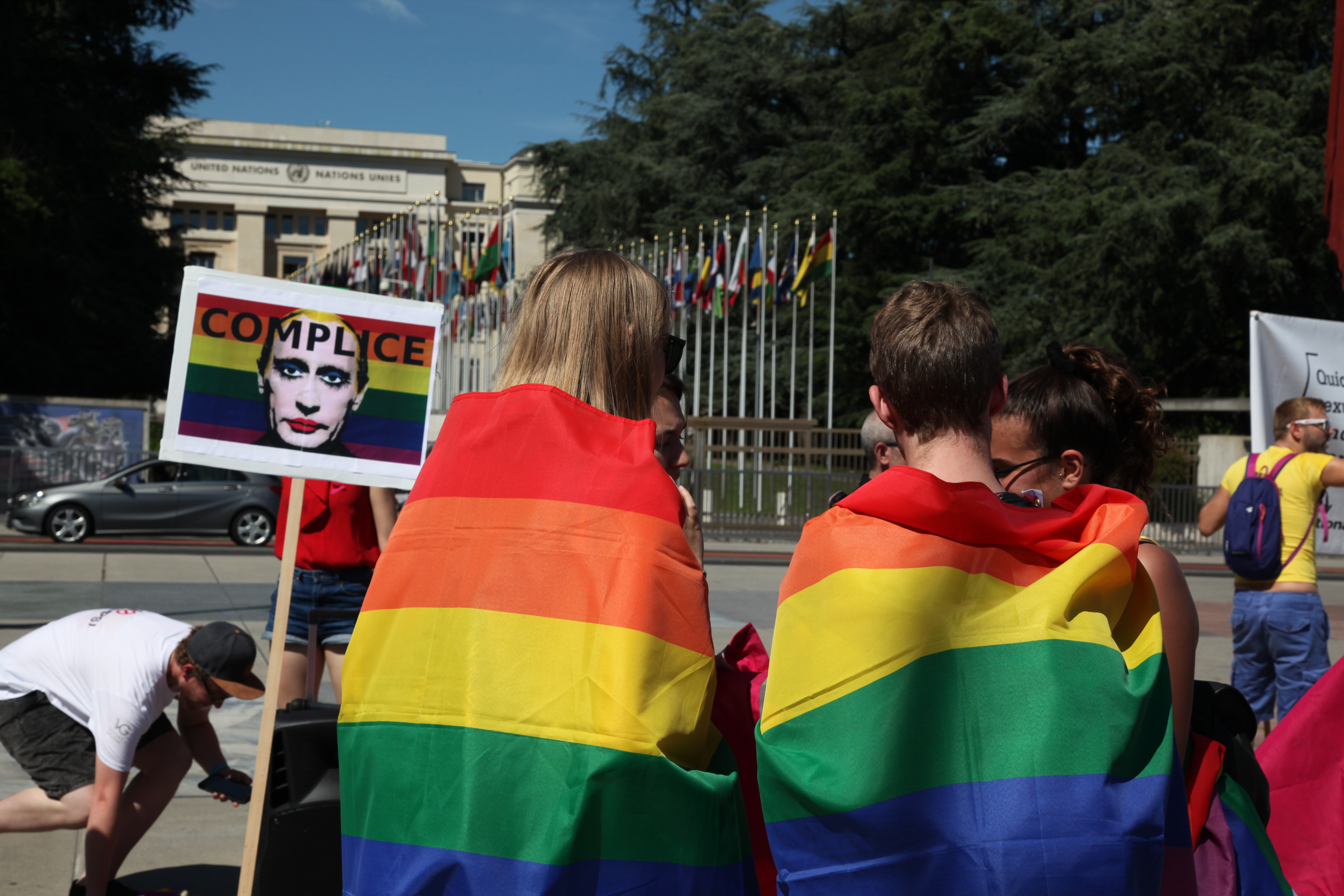
Demonstrations in Geneva against Chechen LGBT persecution, June 2017

The detentions began in February 2017 after a Chechen man who had allegedly committed a drug-related offense was stopped by police and arresting officers discovered contact information for other gay men on his phone.

A second wave of detentions began after the LGBT rights organization Gayrussia.ru applied for permits to hold gay pride parades in four cities within Kabardino-Balkaria in Russia's predominantly Muslim North Caucasus region, although not within Chechnya itself. The application in this district was denied by the Kabardino-Balkar authorities. An anti-gay demonstration followed, along with posts on social media calling for gay people to be murdered by various methods.

Gayrussia.ru organizer Nikolay Alexeyev dismissed suggestions that attempts to organize pride parades in the region had sparked the violence against gay Chechens as speculative and unfounded. The organization had not focused on the Muslim districts in particular, and it had applied for permits for gay pride parades in 90 municipal governments all across Russia in an attempt to collect the inevitable denials, which would be used in a case about freedom of assembly and gay rights before the European Court of Human Rights.

Human rights observers reported that law enforcement across Chechnya began rounding up, imprisoning and torturing gay men, with at least three deaths reported by Human Rights Watch. An April 2017 article by Novaya Gazeta stated that more than 100 men were rounded up by police under suspicion of being gay and three were killed. On 7 April the US State Department stated that it had "numerous credible reports indicating the detention of at least 100 men on the basis of their sexual orientation". A spokesman for Chechnya's political leader denied the report, claiming that there are no homosexuals within their borders as "their own relatives would have sent them to where they could never return", thus there could not have been any persecution of homosexuals by law enforcement. However, the International Crisis Group said they had received corrobating information. According to Novaya Gazeta, reports verified by the Russian LGBT Network, gay men were held at a secret prison in Argun, described in many sources as a concentration camp, where they were subjected to violence and torture. Chechen men who were detained in multiple detention centers report being beaten and tortured with electric shocks.

In a report issued on 13 April 2017, a panel of five expert advisors to the United Nations Human Rights Council—Vitit Muntarbhorn, Sètondji Roland Adjovi; Agnès Callamard; Nils Melzer; and David Kaye—condemned the wave of torture and killings of gay men in Chechnya. The panel wrote: "These are acts of persecution and violence on an unprecedented scale in the region and constitute serious violations of the obligations of the Russian Federation under international human rights law." The panel wrote:

We urge the authorities to put an end to the persecution of people perceived to be gay or bisexual in the Chechen Republic who are living in a climate of fear fuelled by homophobic speeches by local authorities. It is crucial that reports of abductions, unlawful detentions, torture, beatings and killings of men perceived to be gay or bisexual are investigated thoroughly.

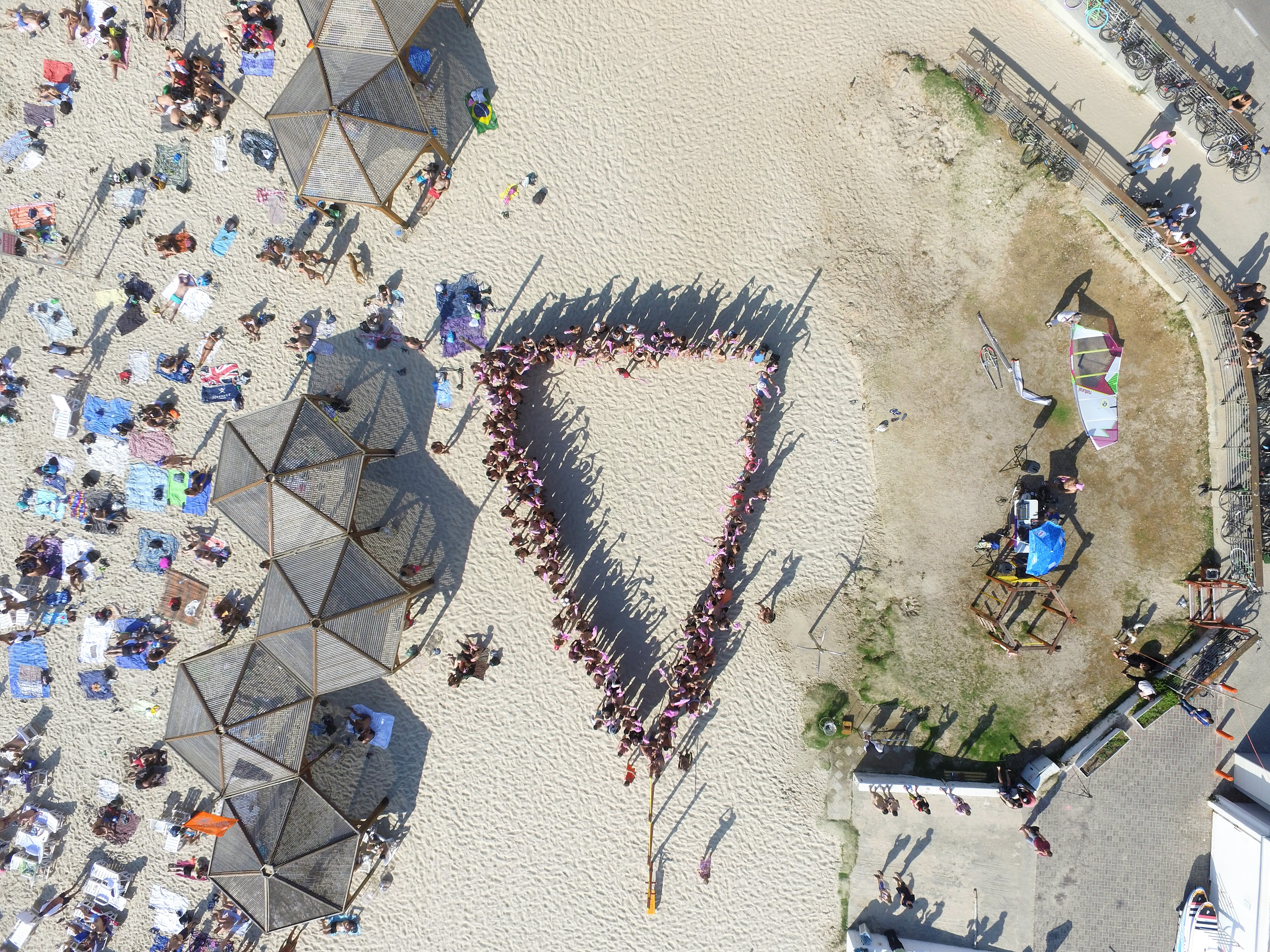
300 Israeli gay men shaped as a "Pink triangle" supporting the gay prisoners in Chechnya

Michael Georg Link, the director of the Organization for Security and Cooperation in Europe's Office for Democratic Institutions and Human Rights, urged Russian authorities to "urgently investigate the alleged disappearance, torture and other ill-treatment" of gay men in Chechnya. General rapporteur of the Parliamentary Assembly of the Council of Europe (PACE) on the rights of LGBT persons, Jonas Gunnarsson, noted "Alarming reports ... from Chechnya in recent days concerning systematic abductions, torture and murders of individuals based on their sexual orientation". Australian Foreign Minister Julie Bishop and the British Foreign Secretary Boris Johnson both condemned the persecutions in Chechnya. They also became an issue in the 2017 French presidential election, with Jean-Luc Mélenchon, Benoît Hamon and Emmanuel Macron condemning Chechnya's Kadyrov government for the detentions, while François Fillon and Marine Le Pen remained silent.

On 12 April 2017, a protest attended by hundreds was held outside the Embassy of Russia in London, U.K.

On 15 April, Chechnya's press minister Dzhambulat Umarov demanded that Novaya Gazeta "apologize to the Chechen people" for suggesting LGBT people existed in the republic, and that if the paper did not stop publishing "hysteria" about "non-existent threats", then other people would "take care of them". This came after an 3 April speech to a crowd by Kadyrov calling the paper "enemies of our faith and of our motherland", with the crowd adopting a resolution of retribution against the journalists "wherever they are and without statute of limitations."

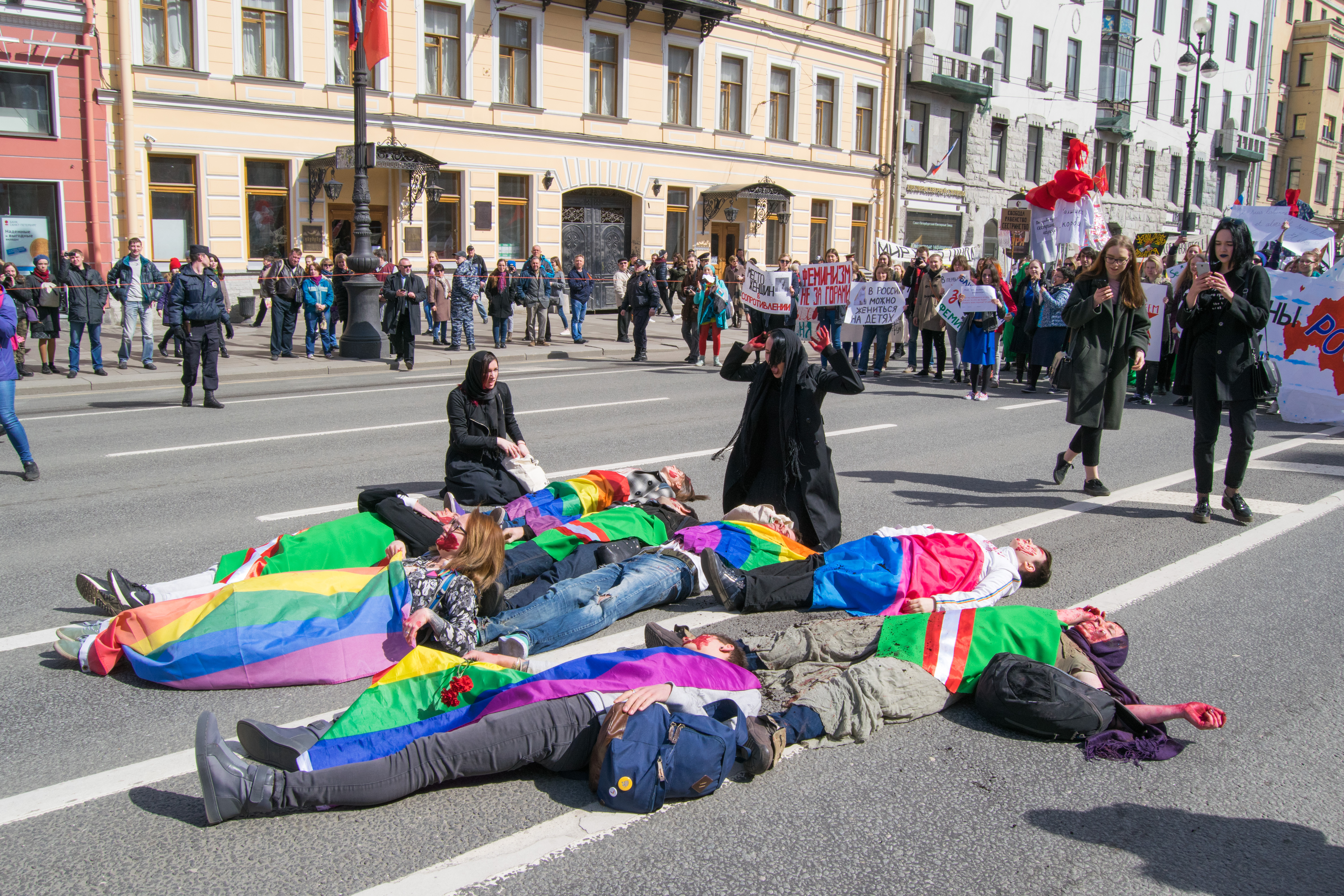
Activists enact a scene of Chechen mothers mourning their children, draped in LGBT and Chechen flags (Nevsky Prospect, Saint Petersburg, 1 May 2017).

On 5 May 2017, a protest attended by hundreds was held outside the Embassy of Russia Tel Aviv, Israel. Later that day, 300 gay men stood in the shape of a pink triangle at Hilton Beach as a reminder of the Nazi concentration camp badges that were used to identify male prisoners accused of being gay.

On the same day, Russian President Vladimir Putin backed an inquiry into a reported crackdown on gay people in the republic of Chechnya, in the North Caucasus.

On 11 May 2017, police arrested five activists in Moscow while attempting to deliver a petition to Moscow prosecutors.

Several Chechen citizens have spoken out about their detention and torture, fleeing the region for other parts of Russia and to safe-houses provided by LGBT activists.

On 16 May 2017, LGBT activist groups in France reported that they had filed a complaint with the International Criminal Court (ICC) against Ramzan Kadyrov. Though Putin has formally withdrawn Russia as a signatory to the Rome Statute, the complaint notes that the court still has a mandate to investigate until November 2017.

Numerous national leaders and other public figures in the West condemned Chechnya's actions, and protests were held in Russia and elsewhere. A report released in December 2018 by the Organization for Security and Cooperation in Europe (OSCE) confirmed claims that persecution of LGBT persons had taken place and was ignored by authorities.

On 11 January 2019, it was reported that another 'gay purge' had begun in the country in December 2018, with several gay men and women being detained. The Russian LGBT Network believes that around 40 persons were detained and two killed.

On 6 March 2019, feminist protest punk rock band Pussy Riot held a demonstration on the steps of South Australia's Parliament, calling on the Australian government to offer asylum to the persecuted gay people of Chechnya. Pussy Riot band member Masha Alyokhina told reporters:

Just in January this year, 40 people were arrested and at least two of them were killed. And this is just the beginning of this year... It's not just about one or two presidents … it's a so-called tradition of Chechnya to kill people who are gay and lesbian... part of the tradition of Chechen people is to kill those women who has so-called 'immoral being', and immoral being is for example to have a divorce, or to have a short skirt and so on...So we are here because we want to stop it, and we want the world to know what is going on in our country.

In May 2019, Human Rights Watch reported that Chechnya police have renewed its crackdown on LGBT people. Allegedly, police have started using unlawful detentions, beatings, and humiliation of men they presume to be gay or bisexual.

== EU's Sanctions ==
In March 2021, Reuters reported that the EU has put immediate sanctions on two government officials working in Chechnya due to ongoing government sponsored and backed violence against LGBTQIA+ individuals.

== Summary table ==
Same-sex sexual activity legal	No Illegal since 1996 (Penalty: De facto punishment since 2017 includes imprisonment, corporal punishment, and capital punishment)
Equal age of consent	No
Anti-discrimination laws in employment only	No
Anti-discrimination laws in the provision of goods and services	No
Anti-discrimination laws in all other areas (incl. indirect discrimination, hate speech)	No
Same-sex marriages	No
Recognition of same-sex couples	No
Stepchild adoption by same-sex couples	No
Joint adoption by same-sex couples	No
LGBT people allowed to serve openly in the military	No (Don't ask, don't tell)
Right to change legal gender	No (Banned since 2023)
Commercial surrogacy for gay male couples	No
