= Lucy Shtein =

Russian feminist activist (born 1996)

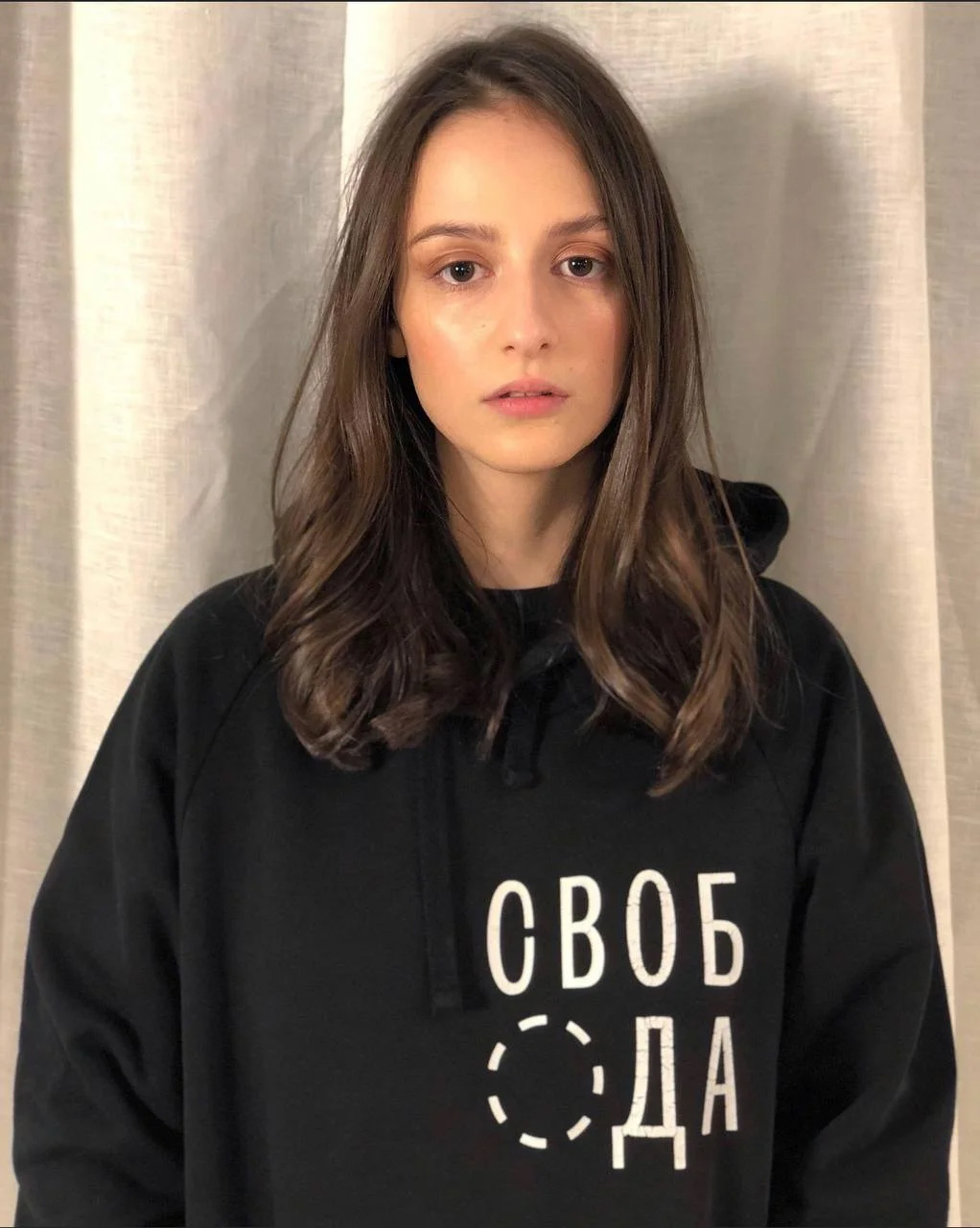
- Born: Lyudmila Petrovna Shtein; 2 July 1996 (age 30)
- Citizenship: Russia; Iceland (since 2023)
- Occupation: Political activist
- Organization: Pussy Riot

Lucy Shtein (Russian: Люся Штейн – Lyusya Shtein, born Lyudmila Petrovna Shtein (Russian: Людмила Петровна Штейн) on 2 July 1996) is a Russian activist and a member of the punk-rock collective Pussy Riot.

== Activism and criminal charges ==
In 2021, Shtein was placed in house arrest in Moscow with her girlfriend, Maria Alyokhina, for supporting political prisoners in Russia. A tracking bracelet mounted to her ankle was used to track Shtein while she remained under house arrest. Shtein, and later Alyokhina, used green food courier outfits to escape. Shtein also smuggled her pet rat in the food delivery bag.

Shtein has spoken against laws in Russia that ban "LGBT propaganda", and in 2022 she and other members of Pussy Riot performed at the pride parade in St. Petersburg, Florida. In 2023, she and three other members of Pussy Riot protested the Russian invasion of Ukraine.

In November 2023 a court in Russia charged Shtein with sharing fake news about the Russian military. In 2024, a Russian court sentenced her to six years in prison, in absentia, for posts on X in which she condemned the Russian invasion of Ukraine.

In response to Alexei Navalny's death in 2024, Pussy Riot members Shtein and Nadya Tolokonnikova took part in memorial action outside of the Russian Embassy in Berlin, along with Lyubov Sobol and Marina Ovsyannikova.

Since 2022, Shtein has been working with the North Caucasus SOS crisis group, which protects the rights of and evacuates persecuted LGBTQ+ people from Chechnya, Dagestan, and other republics of the North Caucasus region of Russia. The work of human rights activists from "North Caucasus SOS" is highlighted in the HBO documentary "Welcome to Chechnya".

== Personal life ==
Shtein has lived in Vilnius, Lithuania since her escape from Russia in 2022. From at least 2021 to November 2023 she was in a relationship with Pussy Riot member Maria Alyokhina. In 2023 the government of Iceland granted Shtein Icelandic citizenship via parliamentary decree. In July 2025, Shtein tweeted that she planned to get married. She is Jewish.
