= Zelim Bakaev =

Russian singer (born 1992)

- Зелим Бакаев
- Born: 23 April 1992; Grozny, Chechnya, Russia
- Disappeared: 8 August 2017 (aged 25); Grozny, Chechnya, Russia
- Status: Missing for 8 years, 8 months and 20 days
- Occupation: Singer

Zelimkhan Khoussainovich Bakaev (Russian: Зелимхан Хусаинович Бакаев; born 23 April 1992) was a Chechen singer. He disappeared in Chechnya on 8 August 2017, while on a brief visit to the region to attend his sister's wedding. He is widely believed to have been abducted and murdered by the Chechen authorities as part of their systematic persecution of homosexual men.

== Career ==
Zelim Bakaev (sometimes Bakayev) was born to Khoussain and Malika Bakaev in Grozny, the capital of the Chechen Republic. Passionate about music, he began singing at a young age in Chechnya. He worked for a year and a half at the Department of Culture of the Grozny Mayor's Office, and became one of the soloists of the song and dance ensemble "Stolitsa" (in Russian, Столица) and performed concerts in Chechnya and other North Caucasian republics. His repertoire included songs in the Chechen language and in Russian. He became popular particularly in Chechnya, Ingushetia, Dagestan and eventually in Russia. In 2013, he took part in the annual Vainakh Awards for upcoming artists. His big break came with singles like "Мичахь хьо лела безам" (meaning “Where are you going, dear”), "Доьхна Дог" (“Breaking the Heart”), and "Нана" ("Mother" in English) as well as in collaboration with Elbika Jamaldinova, with hits "Не хватает тебя" (Miss You) and "Без тебя" (Without You). He also cooperated with the producer Gilany Stadnik and was managed by Leila Vakhayeva. In 2017, Bakaev applied for casting in the Russian version of Star Academy called Fabrika Zvyozd in its 10th season. The series was to start in September 2017 on the Russian television chain Muz-TV.

== Disappearance ==
On 6 August 2017, Bakaev travelled to Grozny to attend his sister's wedding. He was due back in Moscow a few days later as he was scheduled to take part in a Russian musical contest on 10 August. On 8 August, he was reportedly arrested by Special Rapid Deployment (SOBR) security forces, this according to two eyewitnesses as they recounted to TV Rain. Bakaev's cellular phone was also deactivated the same day. Speculations ran that his arrest was for suspicion of being gay. Chechen authorities had declared an anti-LGBT campaign with many reports of persecution of homosexuals in the republic. Bakaev had been previously forbidden from any public appearances in Chechnya.

Bakaev's mother Malika and his aunt received a message that Bakaev had "left" Chechnya. On 18 August, Malika filed a complaint for her son's disappearance with the Grozny police and on 22 August appealed to the Human Rights Council demanding clarifications from them and the Chechen Interior ministry. The Chechen minister of Foreign Affairs and Information denied any involvement by the Chechen authorities in the affair. The Chechen police claimed that Bakaev had purchased a ticket for a train from Nalchik to Moscow with the departure on 11 August.

On 14 September, the American human rights organisation Human Rights First urged the US State Department to intervene with the Russian authorities about Zelim Bakaev. On 16 September, the singer's mother publicly appealed to Chechen president Ramzan Kadyrov asking about her son, but on 18 September, the Chechen Ministry of Internal Affairs refused to open a criminal investigation into the disappearance of Bakaev. Dzhambulat Umarov, Chechnya's minister for national policy, external relations, press, and information, was quoted in RBC as saying, "The guy is not a Wahhabi, not a terrorist, he isn’t involved in any cases. No structures took him, for a hundred years no-one will need him", adding that Bakaev would "reappear soon".

In October 2017, international press outlets accused the Chechen police of murdering Zelim by torture as part of the anti-gay purges in Chechnya.

== Selected videography ==
- "Не хватает тебя" (Miss You) (with Elbika Jamaldinova) (November 2013)
- "Нана" (Nana) (March 2016)
- "Без тебя" (Without You) (with Elbika Jamaldinova) (February 2016)

== See also ==
- List of people who disappeared mysteriously (2000–present)
