= Igor Kochetkov =

Russian gay rights activist (born 1970)

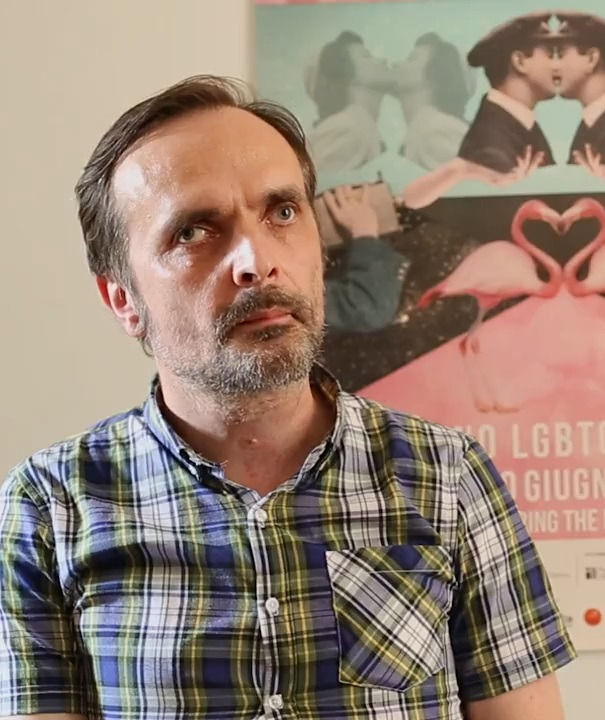
Kochetkov in 2017

Igor Viktorovich Kochetkov (born 13 May 1970) is a Russian gay rights activist who heads the Russian LGBT Network.

Kochetkov has been active in the opposition to the 2013 Russian law that bans promotion of homosexuality to minors. He has blamed the law for legitimizing and increasing violence against gays.

In September 2013, Kochetkov along with other Russian human rights activists met with US President Barack Obama in Saint Petersburg.

Along with Alexey Davydov he was named one of the world's 100 top thinkers in 2013 by the magazine Foreign Policy "for fighting Russia's state-sponsored homophobia".

Along with Frank Mugisha, Sunil Babu Pant and ILGA, Kochetkov was nominated by Norwegian Labour Parliamentarians Anette Trettebergstuen and Håkon Haugli for the 2014 Nobel Peace Prize.
