= Russian LGBT Network =

Russian LGBT rights organization

- Founded: 2006
- Purpose: Protection of rights and social adaptation of LGBT
- Location: Russia
- Origins: Российская ЛГБТ-сеть
- Key people: Igor Kochetkov (chairperson)
- Website: http://lgbtnet.org

The Russian LGBT Network (Russian: Российская ЛГБТ-сеть) is a non-governmental LGBT rights organization working for the social acceptance of and protection of the rights of LGBT people in Russia. Founded in 2006, it was reformed into the first (and only) Russian inter-regional LGBT rights organization on 19 October 2008. The organization is a member of the International Lesbian and Gay Association (ILGA) and is led by Russian LGBT rights activist Igor Kochetkov.

In April 2026, a St. Petersburg court labelled the organisation as extremist in a hearing held behind closed doors. Under Russia's criminal code, the designation may mean that anybody associated with the group would risk "years behind bars" for a crime that is "akin to terrorism". This designation follows the Russian Supreme Court's 2023 decision to designate the "international LGBT movement" as extremist as well as 2020 constitutional amendments which defined marriage as between one man and one woman.

In August 2026 the group announced that, because of that "extremist" designation, it would shut down "to avoid creating additional risks for people."

== Structure ==
The network is governed by a conference, which meets at least once a year. Between conferences, the network is managed by a council headed by a chairperson; both are elected by the conference. The network has 14 regional branches:

- Saint Petersburg
- Petrozavodsk
- Pskov
- Arkhangelsk
- Volgograd
- Kazan
- Naberezhnye Chelny
- Perm
- Samara
- Tyumen
- Omsk
- Tomsk
- Kemerovo
- Novosibirsk
- Crimea

Two offices, in Krasnoyarsk and Khabarovsk, were closed at the beginning of 2010. In addition, the network has 11 LGBT organizations:

- Exit LGBT Organization (St. Petersburg)
- LesbiPARTYya (St. Petersburg)
- Serving Nuntiare et Recreare (LGBT Christians) (St. Petersburg)
- Perspective (Arkhangelsk)
- Ural-Positive (Ekaterinburg)
- Anti-Dogma Info (Chelyabinsk)
- League (Volgograd)
- Human Rights Center of Krasnoyarsk
- The Walls Need to Talk (SDG) (Krasnoyarsk)
- Karelia Circle (Petrozavodsk)
- Rainbow House (Tyumen)

== Goals ==
The network was created to rally public support for the elimination of discrimination based on sexual orientation and gender identity, to spread the idea of tolerance in Russian society and to help LGBT people lead public lives.

== Activities ==
The network offers organizational support and guidance to psychologists, lawyers and other professionals working with the LGBT community, activist groups and local human rights and LGBT rights organizations. With other human rights organizations like Memorial, it seeks recognition for members of the LGBT community who suffered criminal persecution in USSR as victims of political repression.

=== 2019 ===
On 17 May 2019, the association reported that seven people broke into the apartment of one of its volunteers in Saint Petersburg who was not publicly identified. The unidentified assailants threatened the activist and other staff with physical violence and murder. He was aggressively interrogated and threatened with violence. “We will take you to the police office and will break all your bones,” they were told by one of the attackers. The assailants were allegedly looking for a young Chechen woman who had escaped from the region, as well as the Russian LGBT Network emergency programme coordinator David Isteev. The activist said “They told me to tell David Isteev that they were going to find and kill him,” Three of the assailants were identified as Chechens and four implied they were police officers from Chechnya's capital Grozny, but refused to provide identification documents.

=== Designation as foreign agent, liquidation ===
In October 2021, Russian LGBT Network was designated as an unregistered public organization performing the functions of a "foreign agent". An attack campaign against the organization played out on multiple Russian media outlets in November. In February 2022, the Ministry of Justice filed a lawsuit seeking the liquidation of Russian LGBT Network's parent organization Sphere Charitable Foundation, arguing that its operations and activism are contrary to "traditional" values and state policy, and is thus a "threat to public order and the rule of law". Kochetkov criticized the suit as being based on ideology rather than law. On 26 April 2022, a St. Petersburg court ordered the liquidation of Sphere, ruling that the organization had illegally conducted foreign-backed political activity.

== See also ==
- LGBT rights in Russia
- Russian anti-LGBTQ law
- Gayrussia.ru
